= Fairytale Forest =

Attraction at Efteling amusement park, Netherlands

Coordinates: 51.650207°N 5.048604°E

The Fairytale Forest (Sprookjesbos in Dutch) is a 15-acre (61,000 m^{2}) wooded section of the amusement park Efteling in the Netherlands, where a number of well-known fairy tales and fairy tale figures are depicted by animatronics and buildings. Most of the figures are inspired by the Brothers Grimm, Hans Christian Andersen, and Charles Perrault.

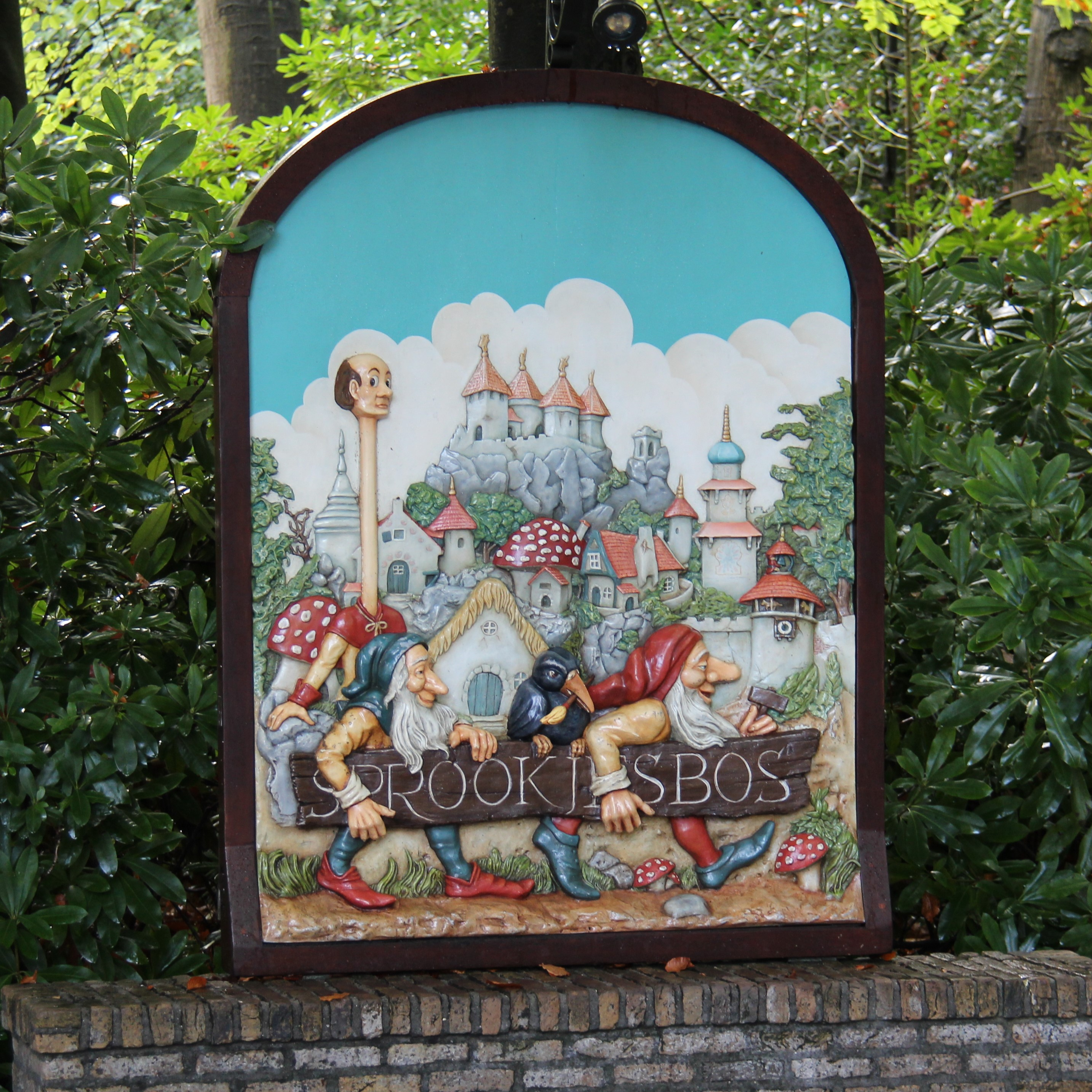
Fairytale Forest

== History ==
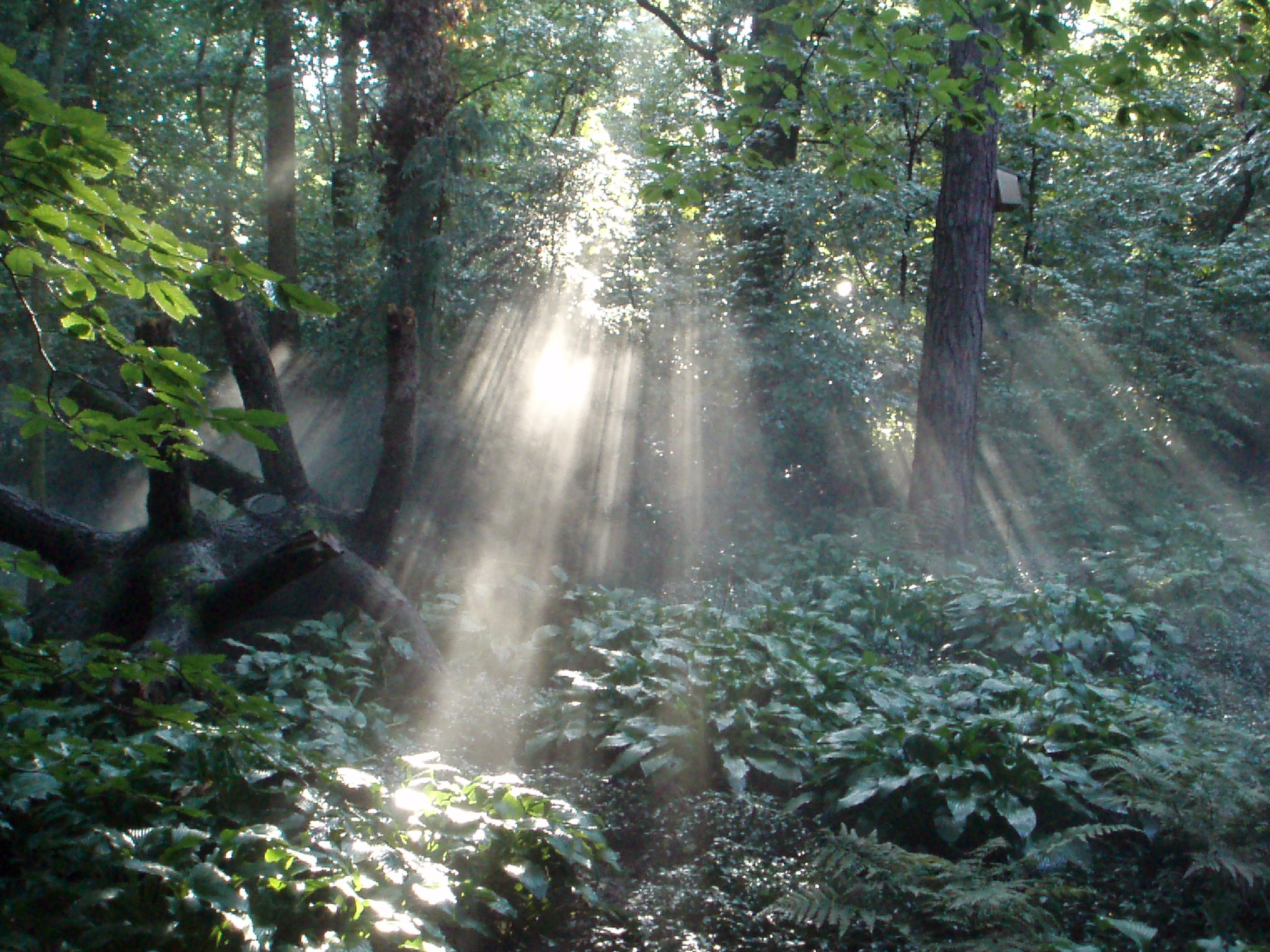
Truly enchanted forest

=== Concept and building ===
The Fairytale Forest was founded on the work of R.J.Th. van der Heijden, Peter Reijnders and Anton Pieck. Van der Heijden conceived the idea in the 1950s to boost tourism. He asked his brother-in-law Peter Reijnders, a filmmaker and amateur inventor from Eindhoven, to recreate a fairy tale theme park that Reijnders had built. Reijnders chose artist Anton Pieck, whose visual style had been inspired by Arthur Rackham and Edmund Dulac, to add the artistic elements.

=== The first scenes ===
It took roughly two years to develop and build the first ten fairy tales: The Chinese Nightingale, The Naughty Princess, Sleeping Beauty, The Gnome Village, "Number One" (referring to the toilets), The Frog Prince, The Magic Clock, Mother Holle, Snow White and The Six Servants.

=== Fairytale Forest ===
The Fairytale Forest has 25 scenes. Some include specific events, such as Little Red Riding Hood at the door of her grandmother's house, while others are more general, like The Gnome Village. There are three types of fairy tale scenes: indoor scenes with a commentary telling the tale (such as The Indian Water Lilies); structures too small to enter but which can be viewed by visitors through the windows (Little Red Riding Hood's grandmother's house); and open-air attractions, such as the fountain for The Frog King or The Naughty Princess.

=== Origins of the scenes ===
There are ten scenes based on Brothers Grimm fairytales: The Wolf and the Seven Kids, Snow White, Hansel and Gretel, Rumpelstilskin, Mother Holle, The Six Servants (Long-neck), Rapunzel, The Frog King, The Wishing-Table and Sleeping Beauty. Three scenes are fairy tales from Mother Goose's Fairy Tales by Charles Perrault: Tom Thumb, Little Red Riding Hood and Cinderella. Five scenes are from Hans Christian Andersen tales: The Emperor's New Clothes, The Red Shoes, The Little Mermaid, The Chinese Nightingale and The Little Match Girl. The tale of The Indian Water Lilies was written by Fabiola de Mora y Aragón. The remaining scenes either do not have a matching tale (such as The Gnome Village and Holle Bolle Gijs) or a tale was created afterward (such as The Gardener and the Fakir and The Magic Clock).

== The Paper Gobblers ==
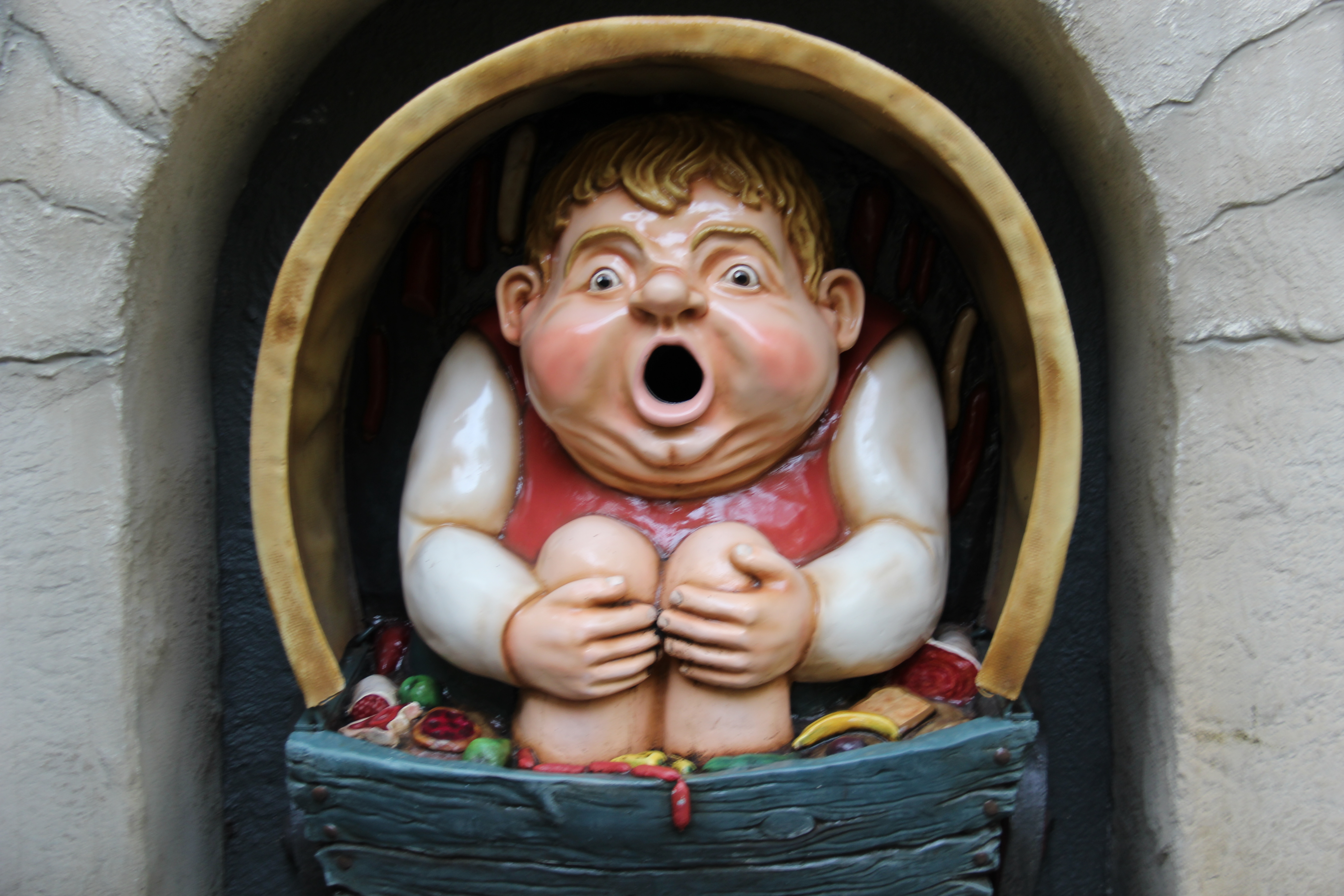
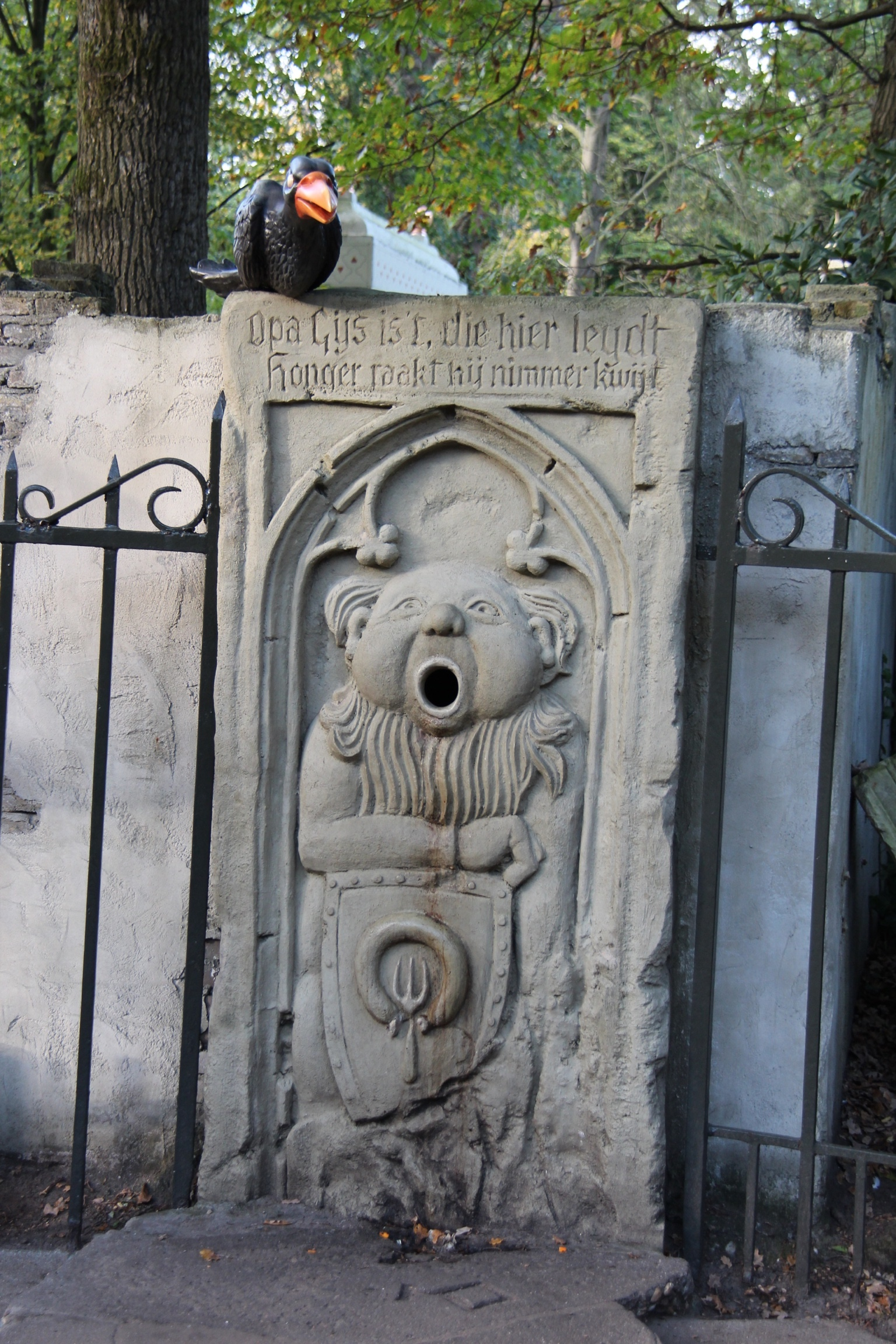

The park's cleanliness is maintained with the help of an ingenious waste disposal system designed by Anton Pieck and Ton van de Ven, and originally conceived by Henk Knuivers. There are 11 talking waste disposals. Children take trash from the ground and stuff it into the disposals to hear the gobbler talk. The most popular gobbler, Hollow Bulging Gijs, makes a gobbling sound when ‘eating’ garbage and thanks the donor politely, whereas Captain Gijs fires a cannon to illustrate his enthusiasm for the guests' tidiness. However, Captain Gijs and the cannon have been removed to make space for the fairytale Pinocchio.

== Fairy tale scenes ==
For each scene, the fairy tale can be read from book plaques provided nearby (usually in Dutch, English, German and French). In some cases, the tale is also presented via electronic voice-over in Dutch only.

=== Sleeping Beauty ===
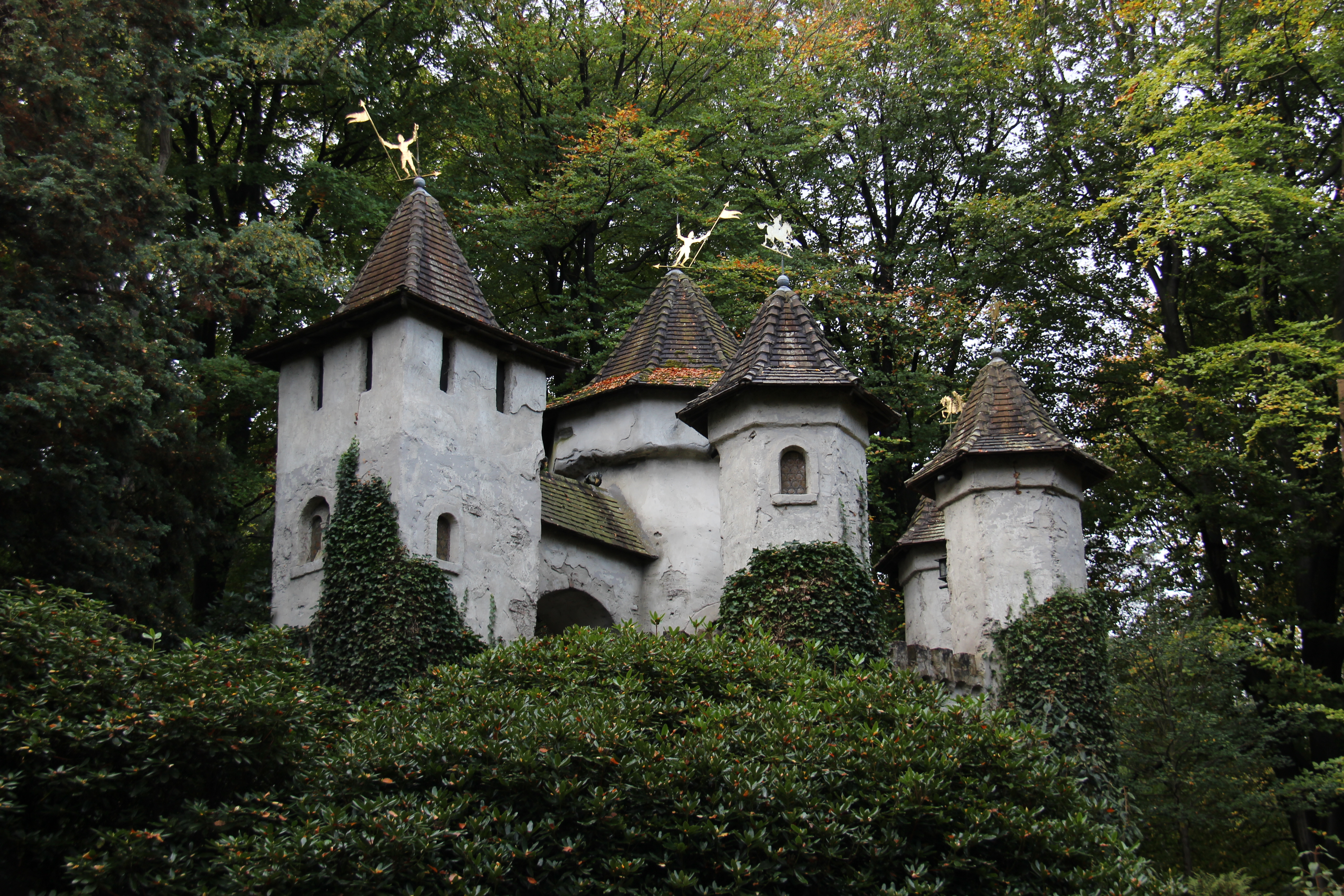
Castle of...

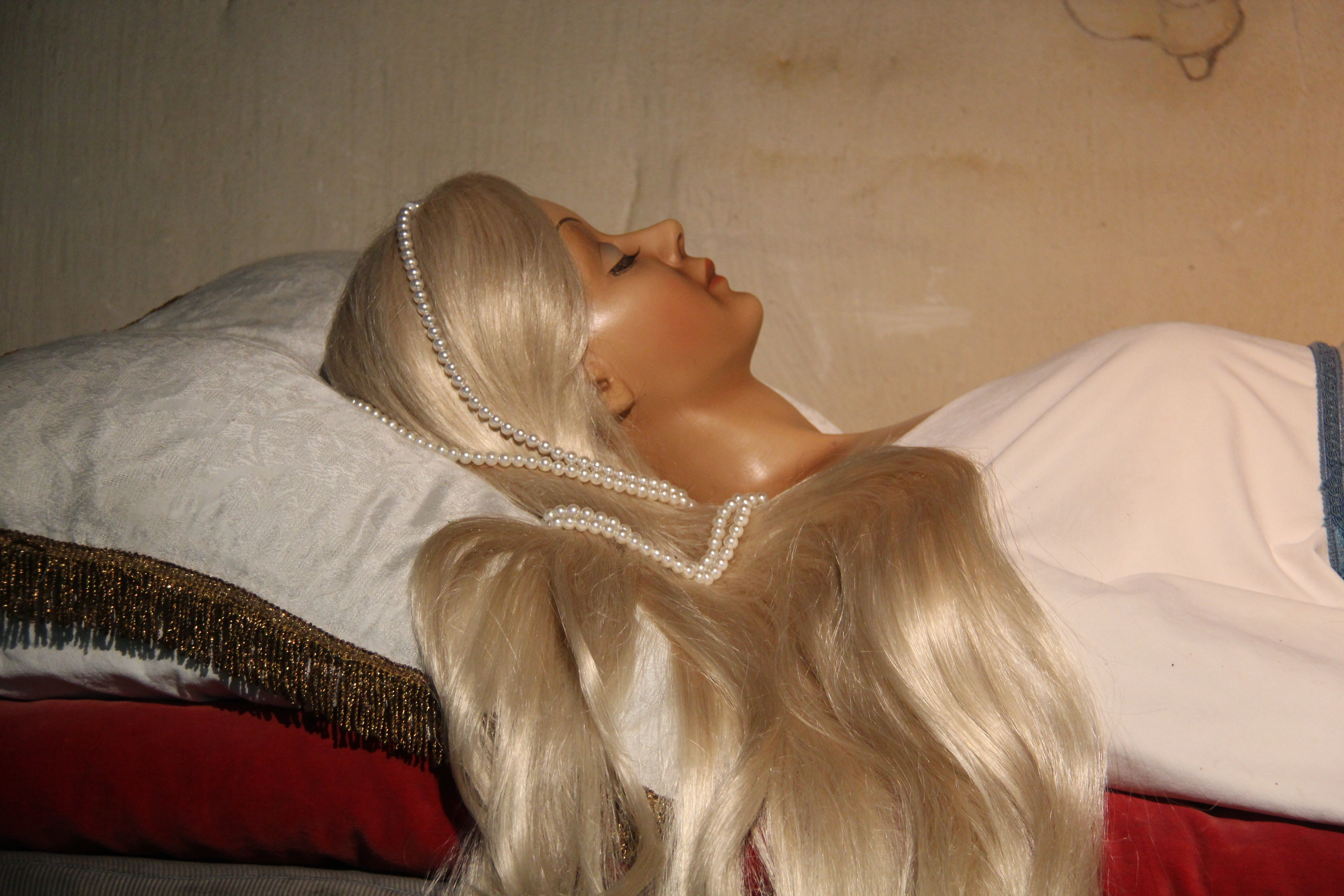
...Sleeping beauty

Designed by Anton Pieck & Ton van de Ven as Doornroosje.

Sleeping Beauty's castle was built in 1952. The rooms were decorated and Sleeping Beauty, a sleeping guard, and two sleeping cooks were introduced the following year. Instead of climbing roses, faster growing evergreen ivy was used to partially cover the castle. The castle was completely renovated in 1981. The poles and chicken wire with plaster were replaced by bricks. An extra animatronic scene of the wicked witch spinning yarn was added. Also in 1981, the sleeping guard was renewed, and again in 1997. In 2024 the castle was again renovated, which lead to minor upheaval as sleeping beauty's breast were enlarged, according to the park to be closer to the original (1950's) design.

Visitors cannot enter the rooms of the castle, but instead look through the windows to see the various scenes. Both the Brothers Grimm and Charles Perrault have written versions of the tale. The story is about a young maiden; who has been cursed by an evil fairy at birth and fell into an enchanted eternal sleep, and awaken by the kiss of a prince.

=== Herald Square ===
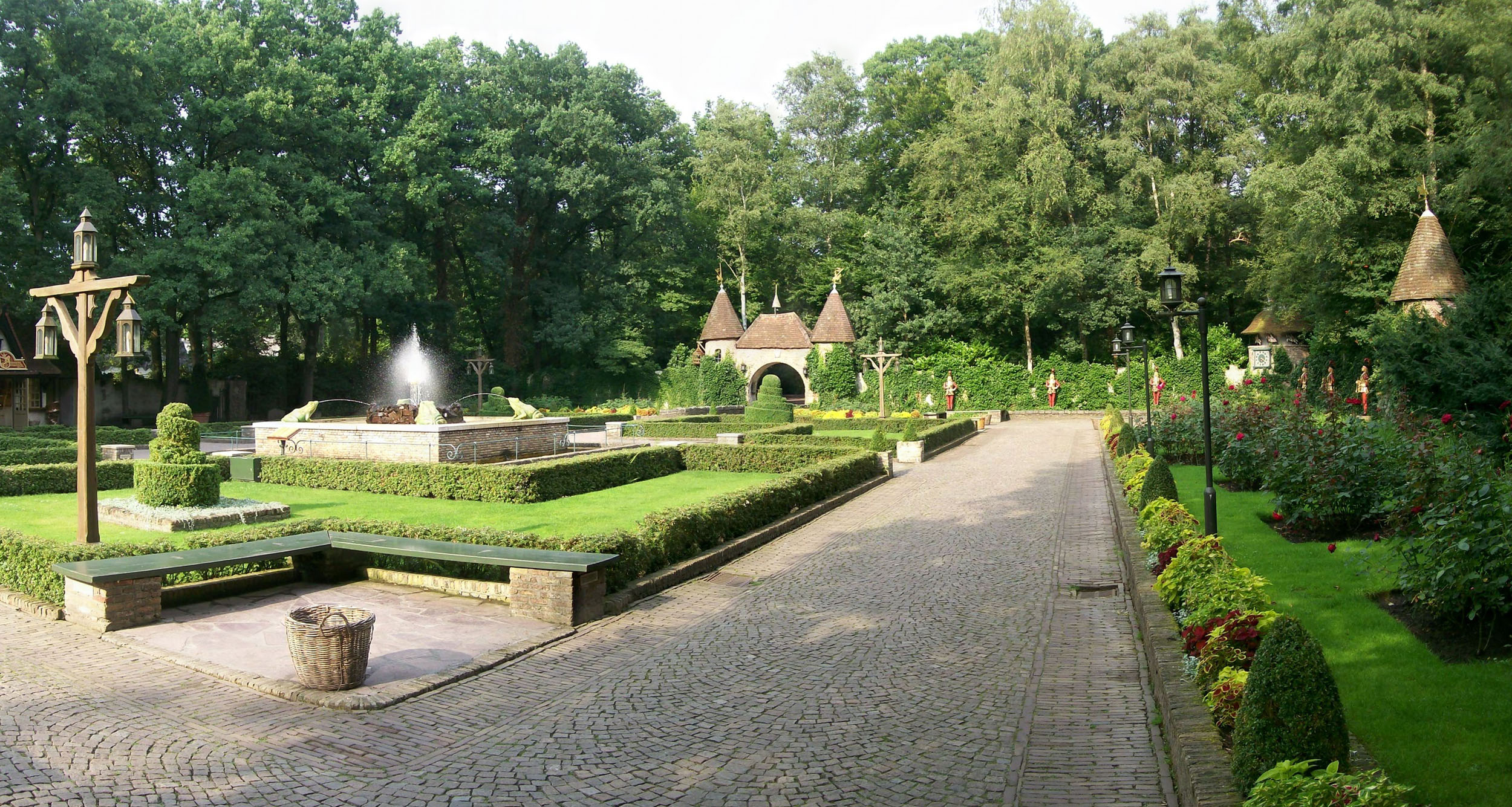
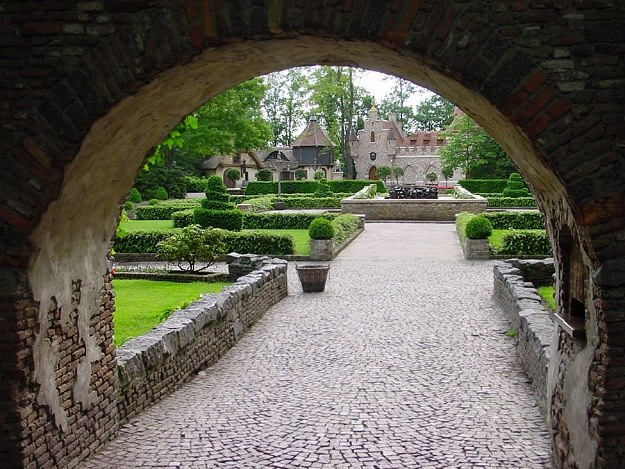
Herald square

Designed by Pieck & Henny Knoet as Herautenplein.

Herald Square is the central square of the Fairy Tale Forest, built in 1952. The gate, the magic clock and the fountain create a picturesque environment. The original name was ‘Castle Square’, but the stone princes blowing their horns were confused with heralds, so the name was changed to ‘Herald Square’.

=== The Frog King ===
Based on The Frog Prince, the scene was designed by Pieck as de Kikkerkoning. Where four frogs created a fountain and a hologram of a ball appears.

=== Snow White ===
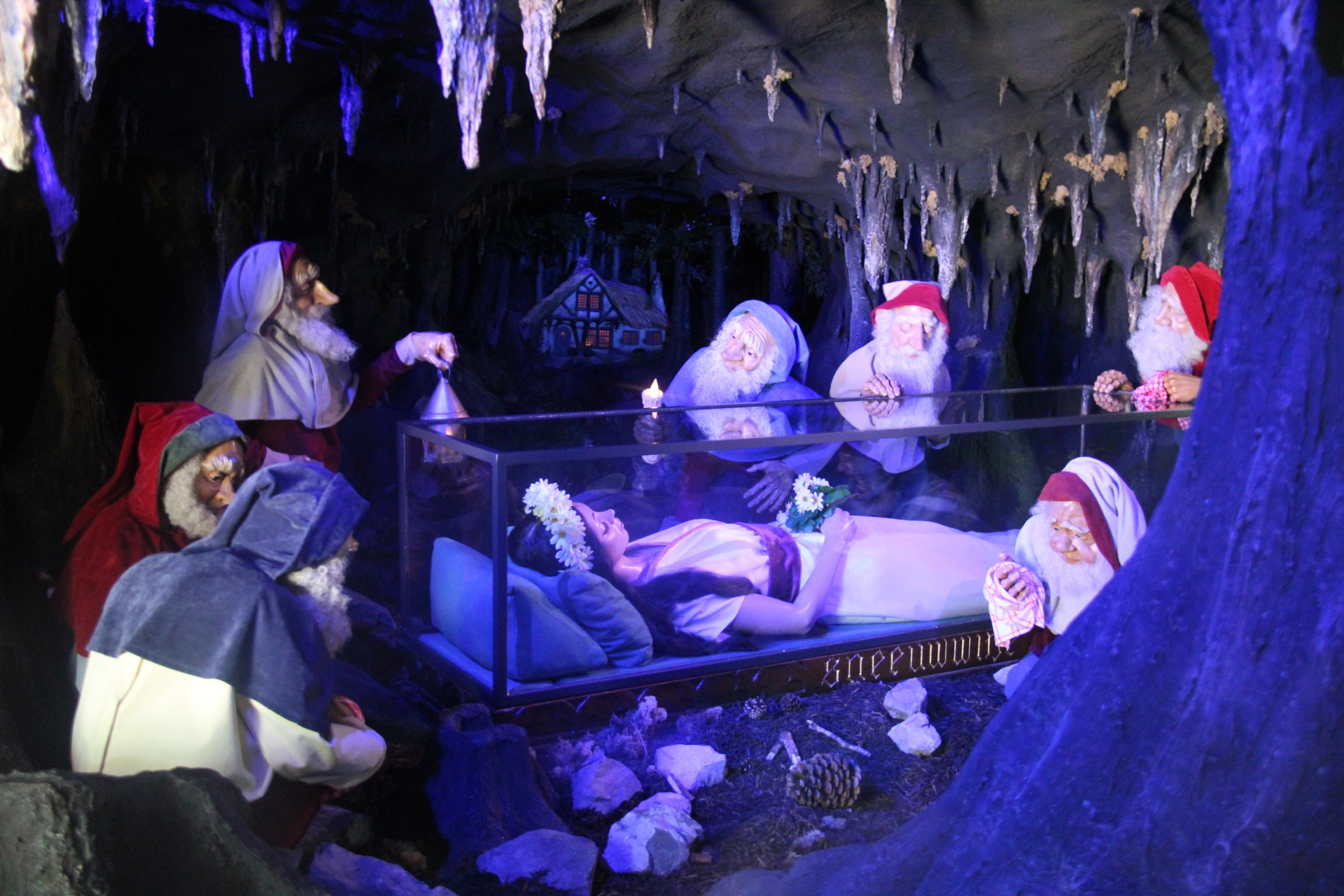
Sneeuwwitje

Designed by Pieck, Van de Ven and Knoet as Sneeuwwitje. Renovated in 1975.

Snow White first stood in a cave with a hole so you could watch it from outside, with seven stone dwarfs crying over her sleeping death. Then later, the cave was renewed, and the stone dwarfs were replaced by moving animatronics. Snow White remained the same, sleeping in a glass box. In 1999, the castle's stepmother appeared in a mirror, with her holographic reflection. In 2018, the cave went down for a major refurbishment, the dwarfs got new clothes, the scenes were renewed and the lighting was updated.

=== The Magic Clock ===
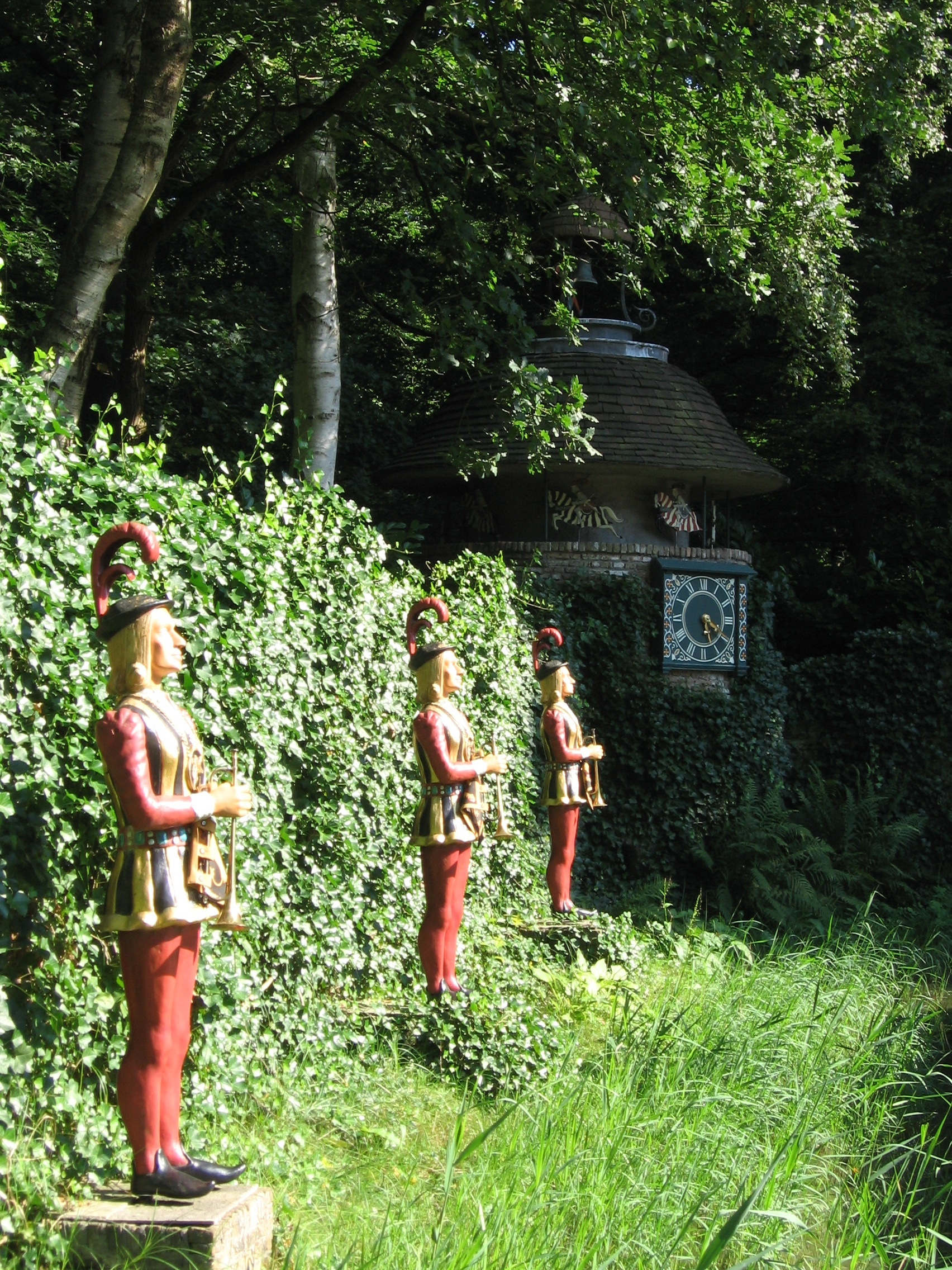
The Six Princes

Designed as De Magische Klok, it depicts one of Efteling's own fairy tales. Every quarter of an hour, the magic clock comes to life and its characters tell us the story. The six princes are animatronics.

In 2012, the animatronics were renewed.

=== Dwarf Village ===
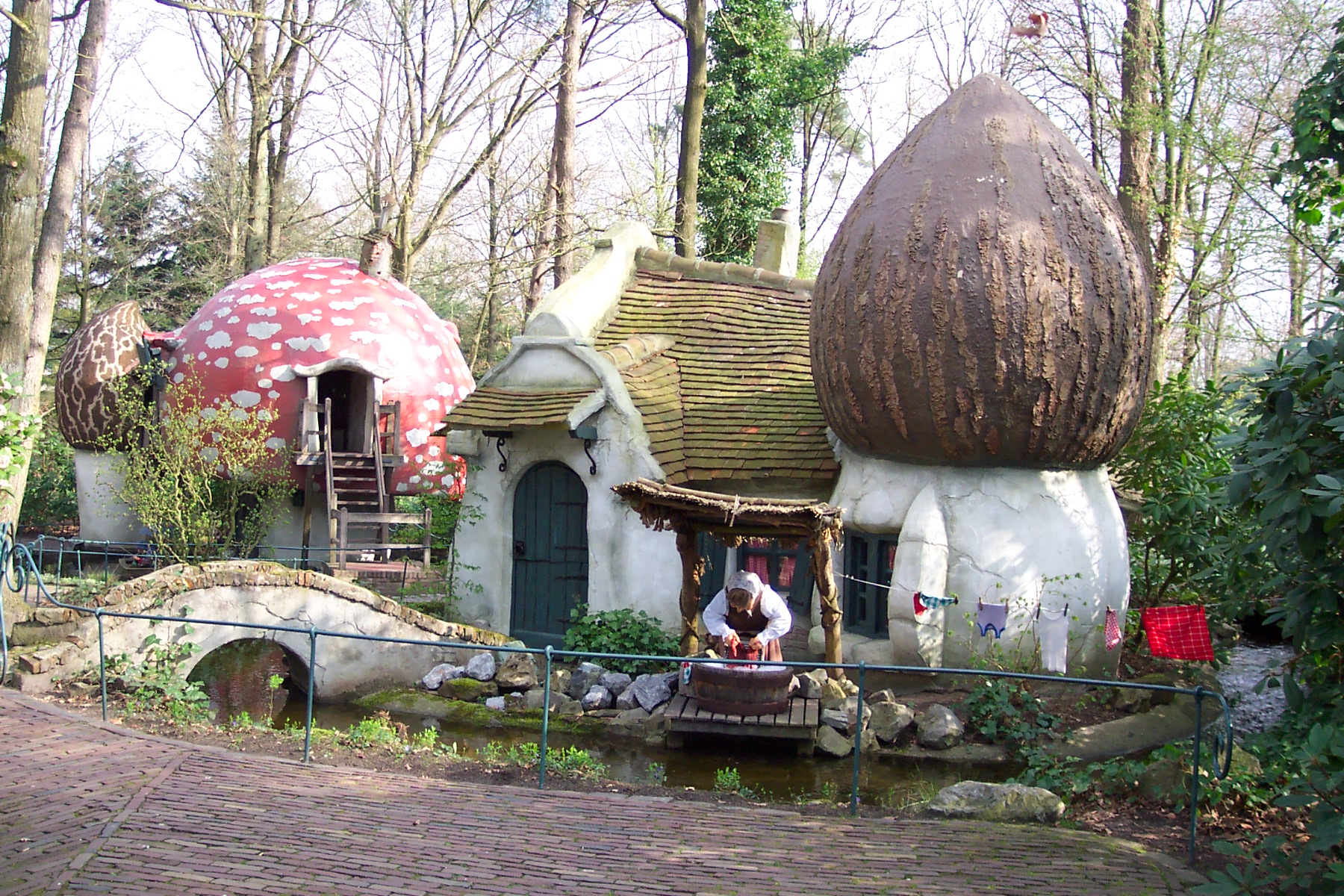
the Dwarf Village

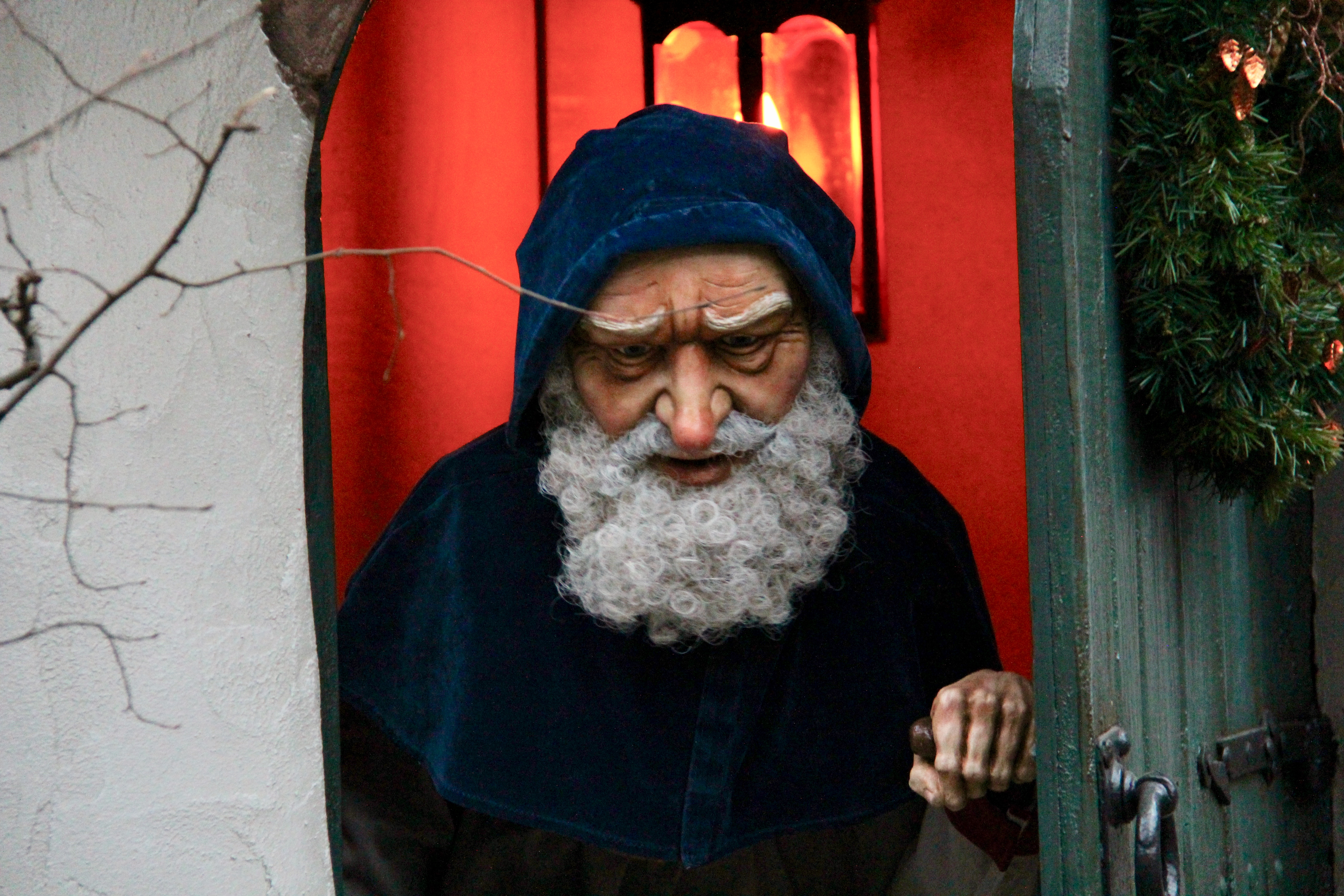
Yanking the dwarf's chain

Dwarf Village was originally designed by Anton Pieck with later contributions by Ton van de Ven. In 1952, the village consisted of three large toadstools, through which children could walk, with miniature adornments, such as little chairs and dwarf laundry hanging from a wire. Later additions included a large inhabited dwarf house in 1972, and a hollow tree with a dwarf playing a clavichord in 1974. The village was completed by a toadstool with a writing dwarf and a house with a waterwheel belonging to a dwarf-couple in 1980. During the 1980s, the male dwarf received spoken lines.

In 2017, the three large toadstools were rebuilt with modern materials.

=== The Six Servants ===
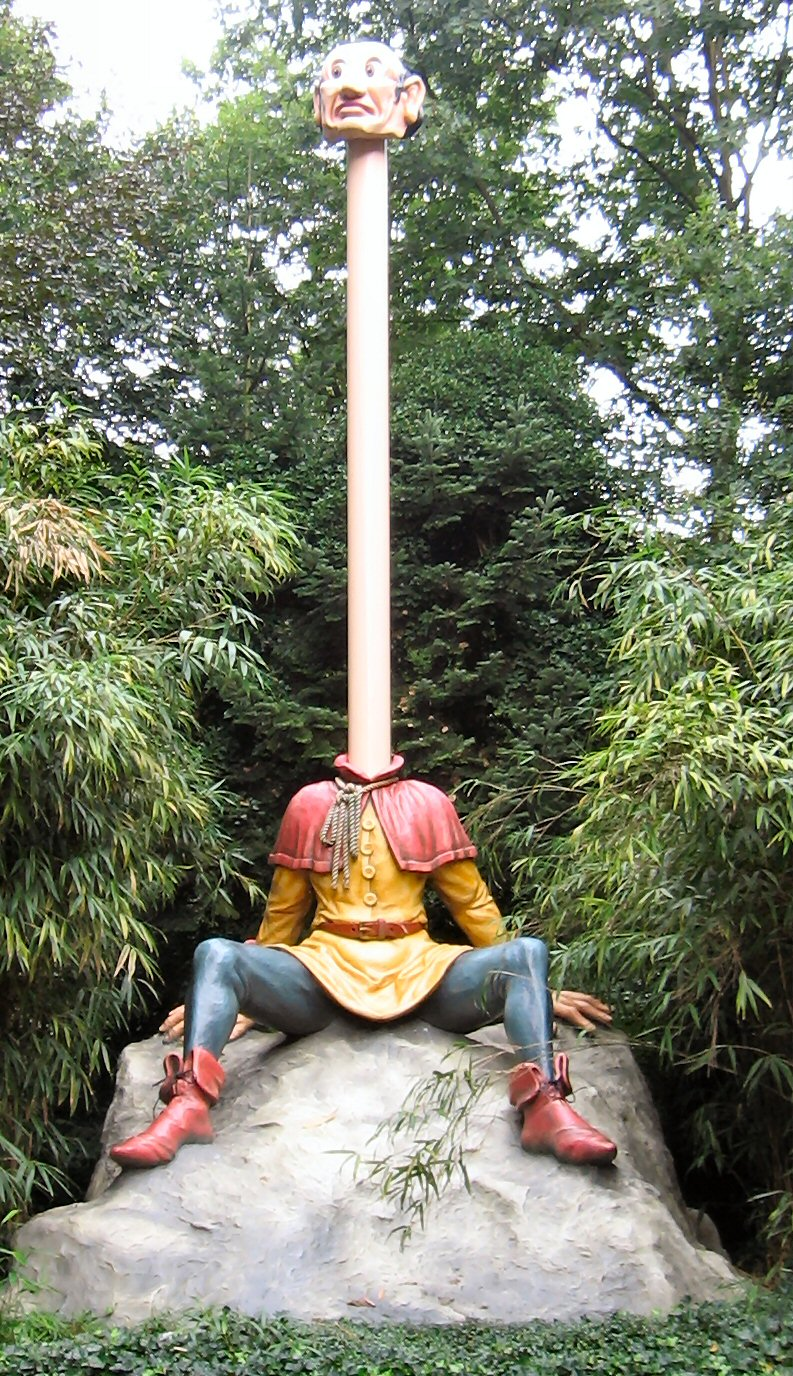
Langnek, one of the six servants

Designed originally by Anton Pieck, with later contributions of Ton van de Ven. The original Long-neck (one of the six servants from the Grimm tale, The Six Servants, who could see everything due to his long neck and sharp eyes) was built in 1952. In 1955, a little pond was dug around the stone on which Long-neck sits. A bust of Bullet-eye with a wasp on his nose stood next to Long-neck. Bullet-eye was one of the six servants.

In the late 1950s, Bullet-eye was removed and a smaller bust of a blindfolded Bullet-eye was placed upon a kiosk near Long-neck. Long-neck received a new head in the 1970s; and in 1979, his body and neck were renewed. In 2006, safety-fences were placed near the pond. In 2013, the rocks were remodeled and Long-neck received a new head again.

The tale is voiced by Peter Reijnders.

=== The Chinese Nightingale ===
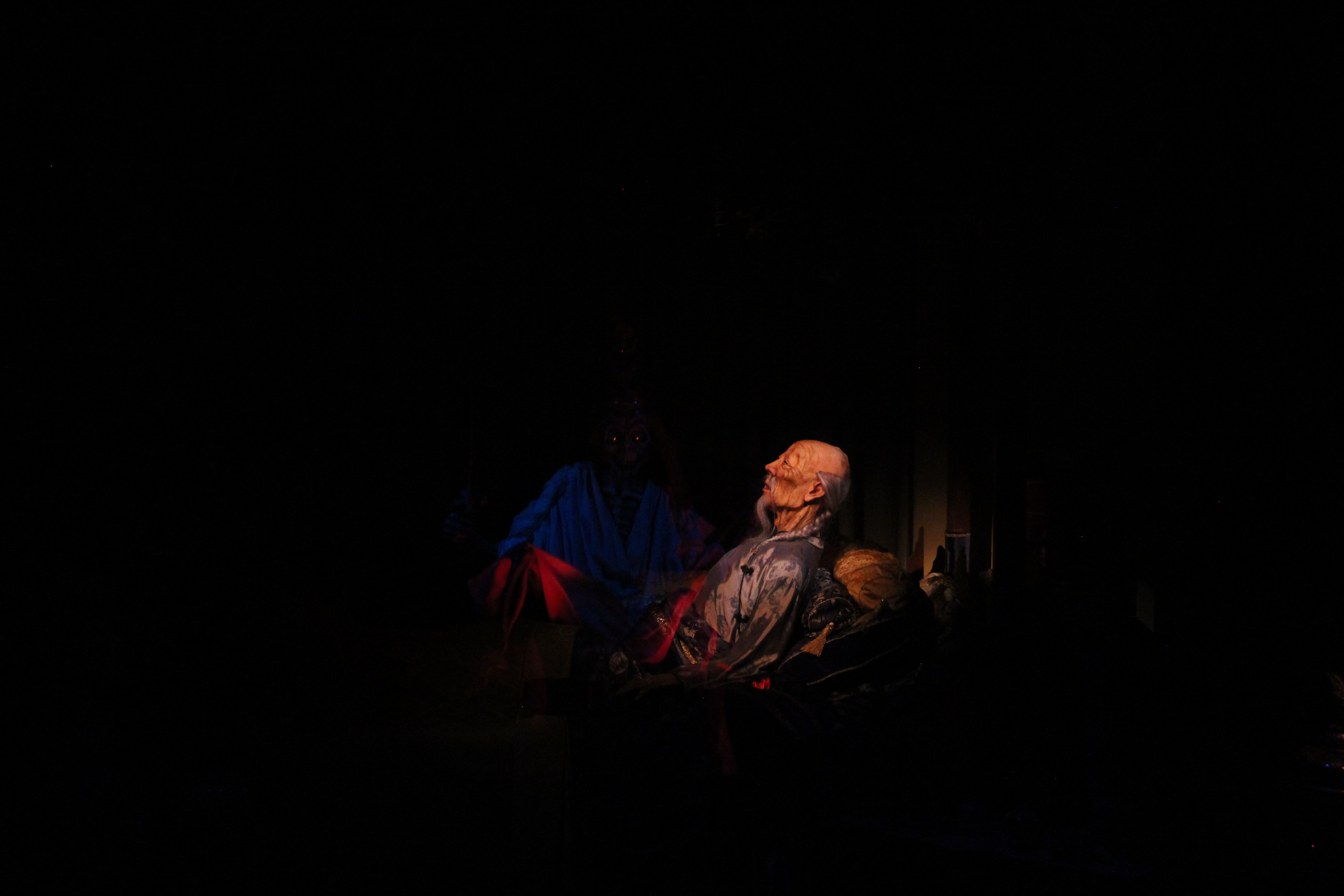

Designed by Pieck and Van de Ven as De Chinese Nachtegaal.

The scene from The Nightingale shows the emperor's death, and how the nightingale restores his life by singing. The nightingale was one of the first fairy tales when the Fairytale Forest opened in 1952. Back then, it was just a small scene, with the nightingale on a branch. In 1979 it got replaced by the Dragon. In 1999, the new scene opened. The new scene is much bigger and is located in a building inspired by classic Chinese architecture.

The tale is voiced by Angélique de Boer.

=== The Talking Parrot ===
The Talking Parrot was one of the ten original scenes from 1952, designed by Anton Pieck. The tale is about a naughty princess who used to mock people's voices and movements. She was turned into a parrot by an old fairy whom she ridiculed. When the girl regrets her sins, the fairy vetoes the spell and "they live happily ever after". The scene is depicted by the parrot, which records sounds for a few seconds at a time and then plays back any sounds captured on the recording. The scene was titled "The Naughty Princess" before being renamed to "The Talking Parrot".

=== Mother Hulda ===
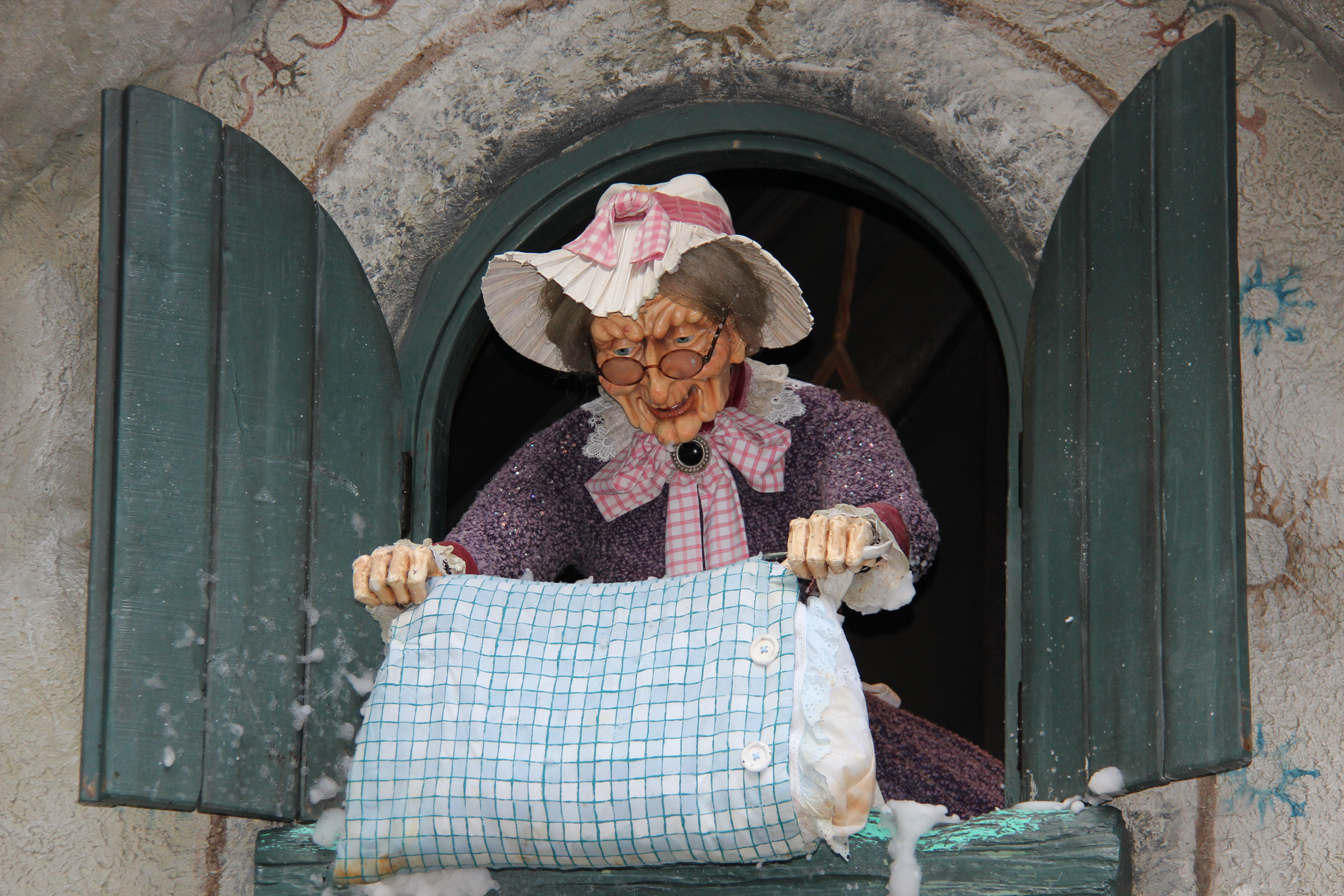
Mother Hulda

Based on the Grimm tale, the scene was designed by Pieck as Vrouw Holle. This story has been depicted, since the park opened, by a well. At the bottom of the well images are projected by Anton Pieck while a voice tells the story.

Since the winter of 2006, Mother Hulda is present in person with a new animatronic. If called upon, she opens the shutters of the cottage next door and shakes her pillow. And as in the tale, it starts to snow.

=== Little Red Riding Hood ===
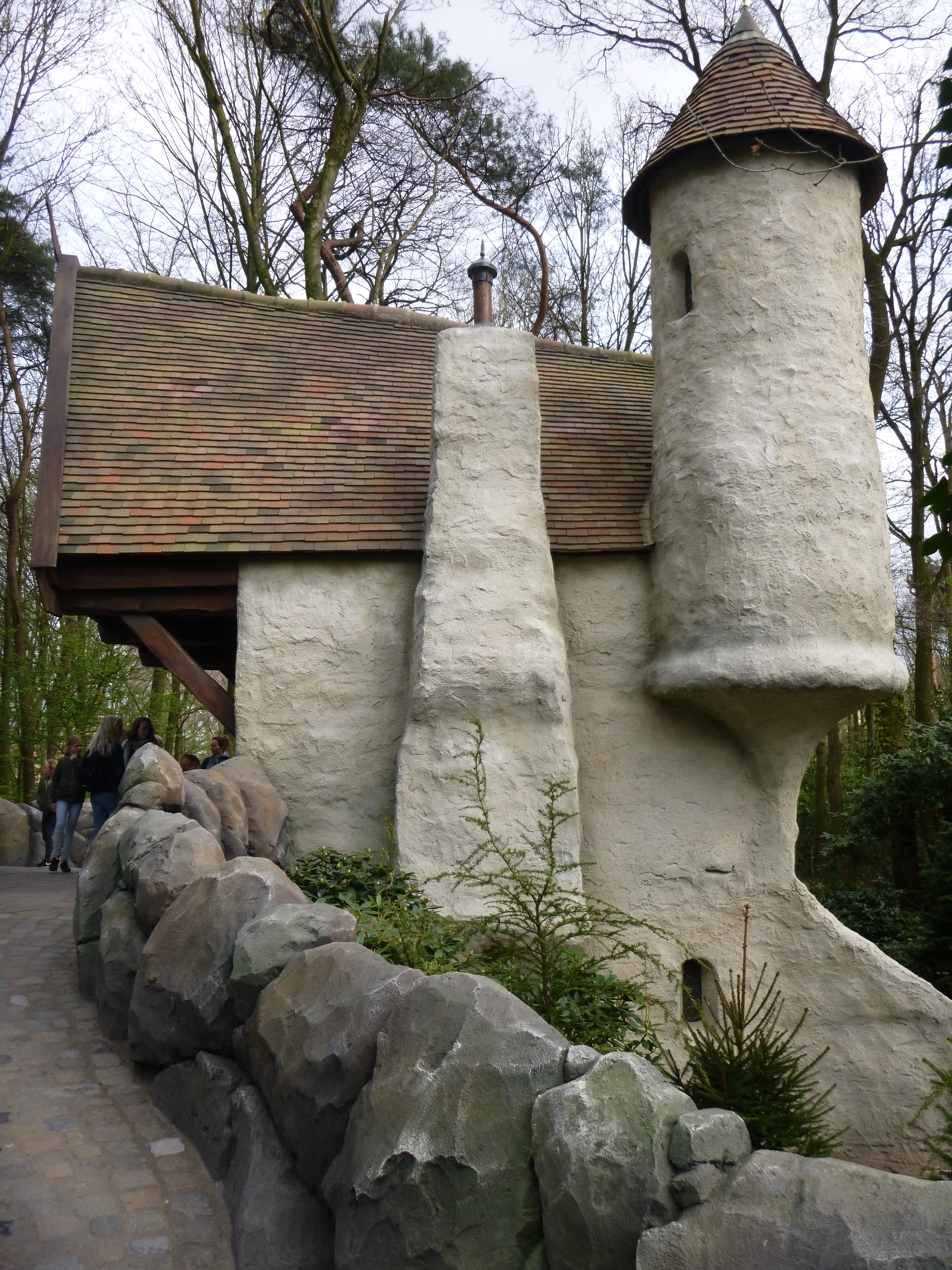
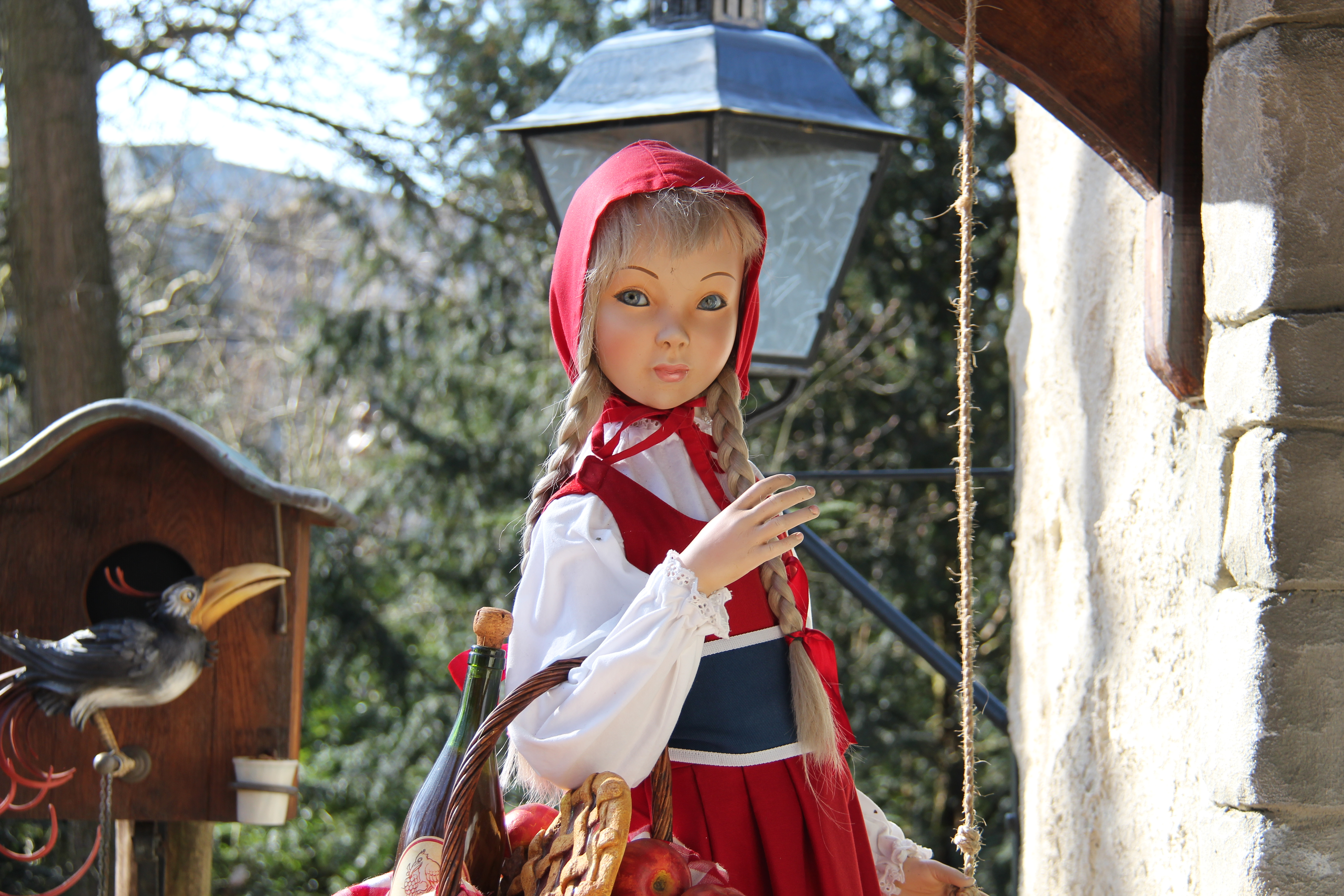
Little Red Riding Hood

The scene was designed by Anton Pieck. Little Red Riding Hood and the wolf entered Efteling in 1953, made of wood, as an outdoor scene. Little Red Riding Hood knelt in the midst of flowers while the wolf watched her from behind a tree. In 1960, the scene was replaced by Granny's house, with the wolf lying in bed and Red Riding Hood at the front door, ringing the bell. The wooden Little Red Riding Hood would later return to the Fairy Tale Forest as a road-sign. One can look through the window and listen to the story, told by Wieteke van Dort.

On August 15, 1998, the figure of Little Red Riding Hood was stolen; but was found the next day at the Dominicus Church in Tiel. During its brief absence, an actress played Little Red Riding Hood in the Fairy Tale Forest. On October 4, 2006, it was stolen again and found at a retirement home in Kaatsheuvel.

In 2016, the house was rebuilt, with new building techniques. Also in 2016, the animatronic of the crow Krakeeltje was renewed with new movements.

=== The Red Shoes ===
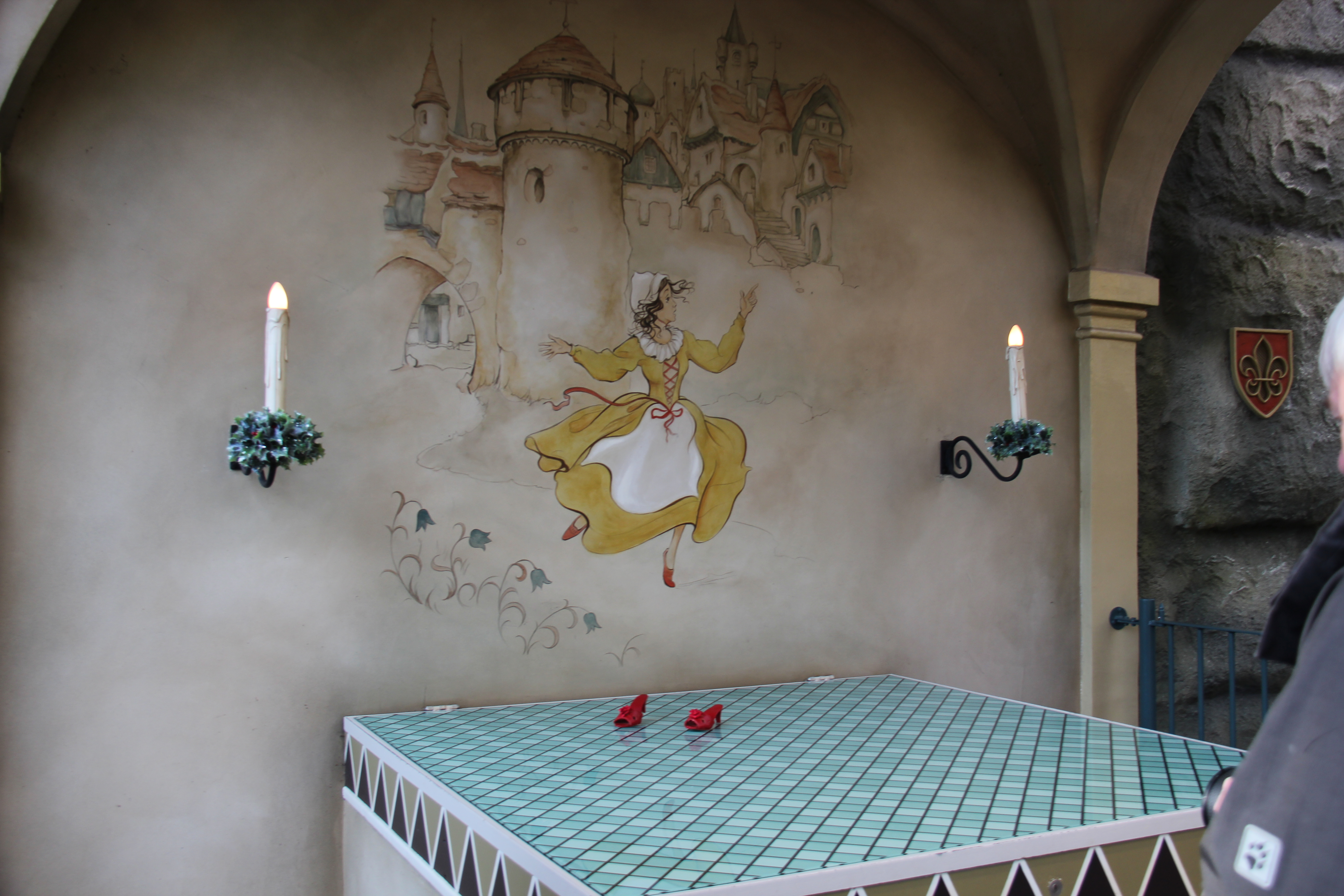
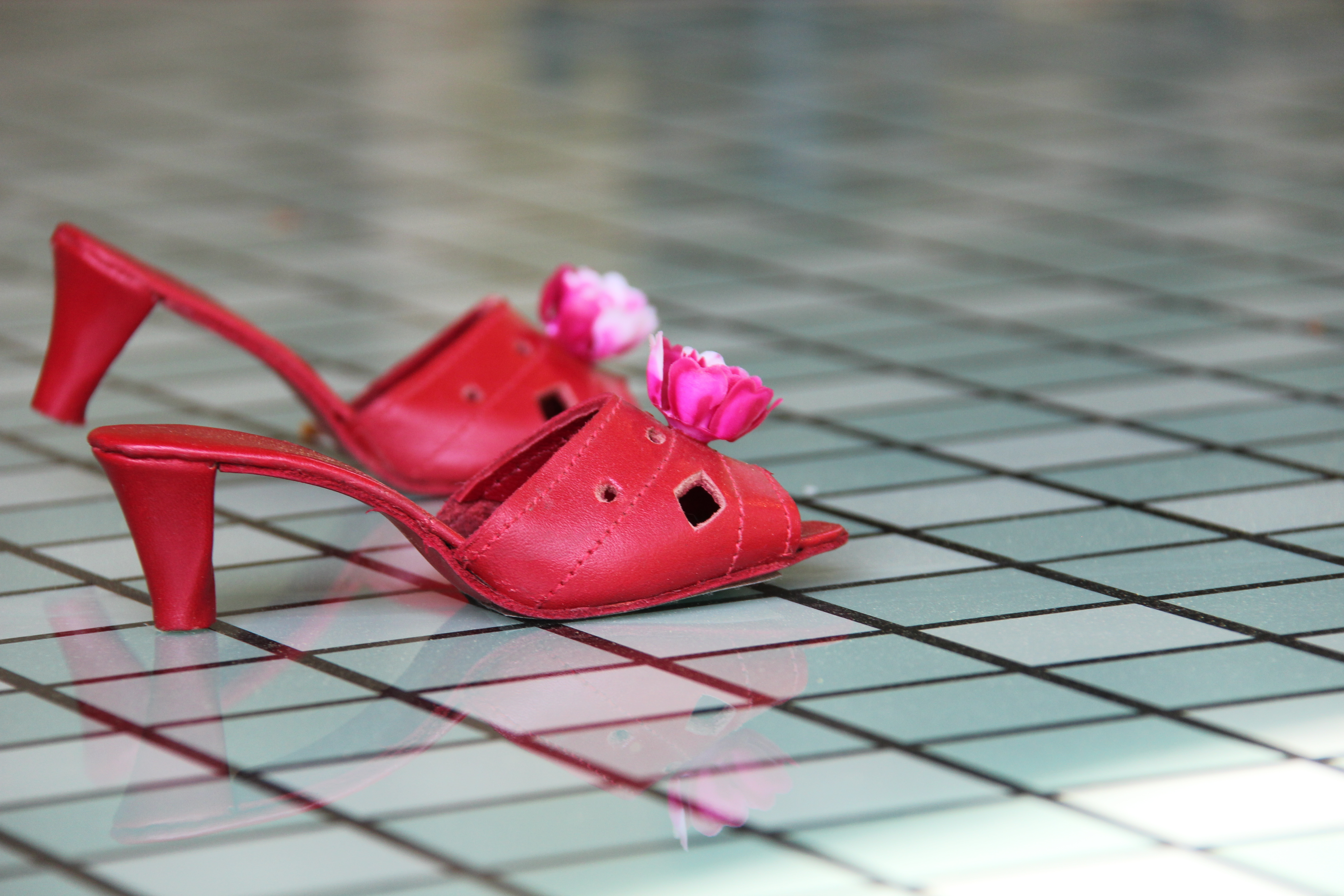
The Red Shoes

Designed by Anton Pieck, the Dancing Shoes entered Efteling in 1953. The scene contains a little dance floor with two red shoes dancing, covered by a porch roof. Visitors can listen to the story, told by Wieteke van Dort, after which the shoes dance to the music of "The Clog Dance" by Jan van Oort.

The original story by Hans Christian Andersen has been adapted to be more suitable for young children. In the original story, the girl's feet are cut off to stop her dancing. In the adaptation, the straps of her shoes are cut, after which the girl can stop dancing, but the shoes keep moving. The shoes are moved by two rotating discs with magnets, a mechanism developed by Peter Reijnders.

=== Hansel and Gretel ===
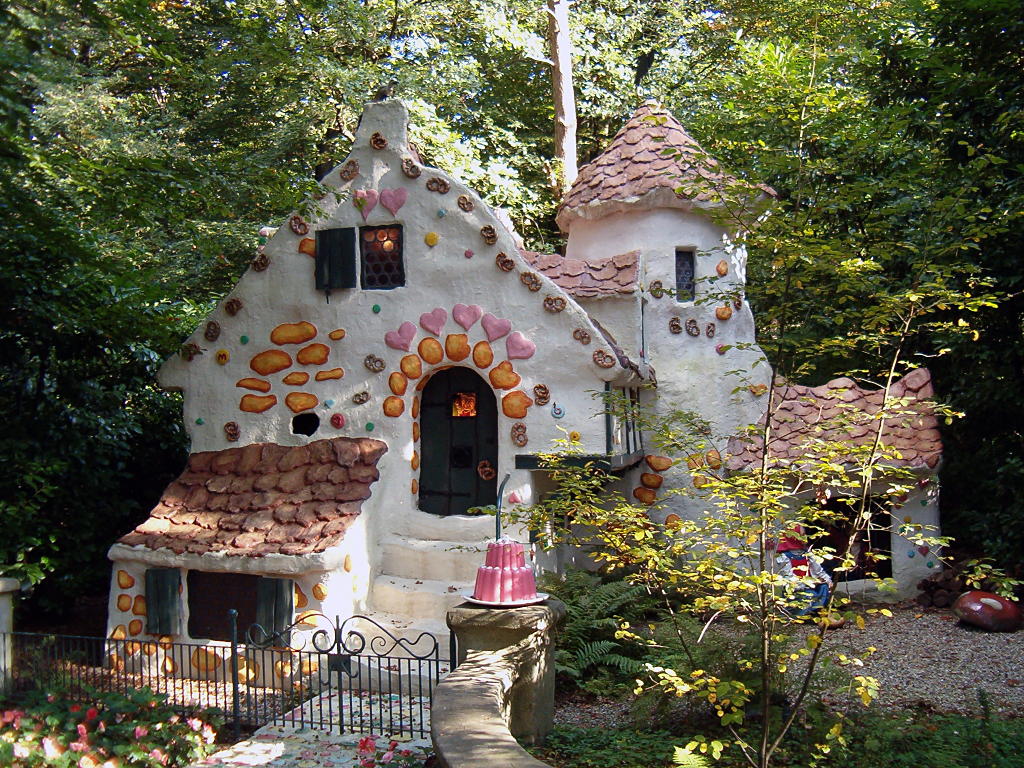
The witch's candy hut

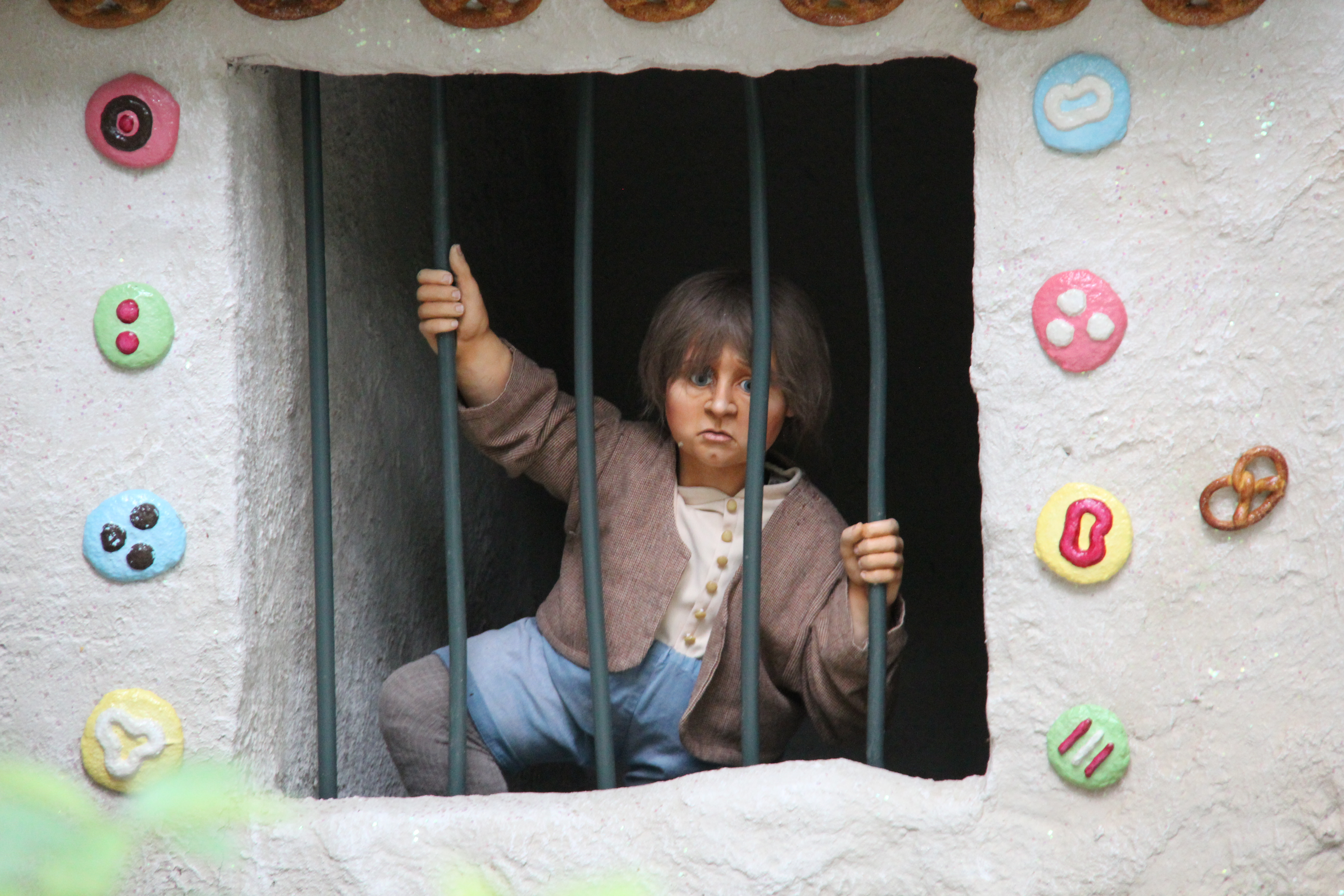
Hansel in the cage

Hansel and Gretel was designed by Anton Pieck and presented to the public on June 20, 1955. The scene consists of the witch's house with candy on the walls, pancakes as roofing tiles and a cake on top; and in the garden, a fountain of red lemonade. Gretel sits by the cage in which Hansel is held in the garden. The witch's face can be seen through a little window in the front door.

In the late seventies, the wood figures were replaced by moving animatronics. An interactive element was added by Peter Reijnders: when one moves the front gate, a crow on the roof caws, smoke comes out of the chimney, a black cat with yellow eyes comes out of a hole in the wall and the witch (voiced by Peter Reijnder's daughter) says "Knibbel, knabbel, knuisje, wie knabbelt aan mijn huisje?" (Dutch translation of "Nibble, nibble, mousekin, who's nibbling at my housekin?").

In 2016, the animatronics of Hansel and Gretel were replaced by more realistic versions of them.

=== The Wishing-Table ===
Designed by Pieck and Knoet as Tafeltje-dek-je.

=== Guinevere's Bridal Gown ===
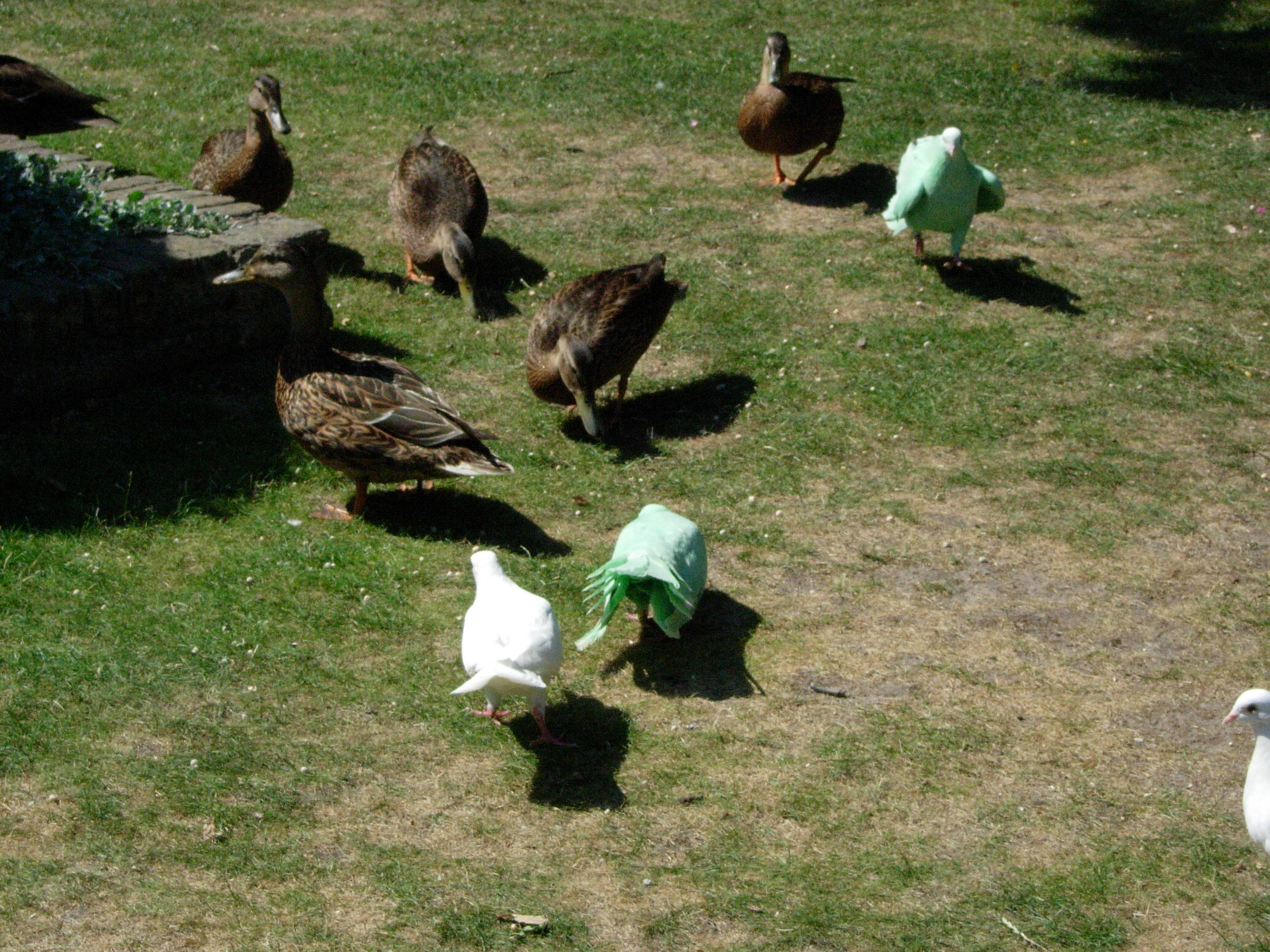
Some coloured pigeons

Designed as Het Bruidskleed van Genoveva. Presented in the area of Snowwhite as white pigeons.

Until June 2018, the pigeons were coloured.

=== The Gardener and the Fakir ===
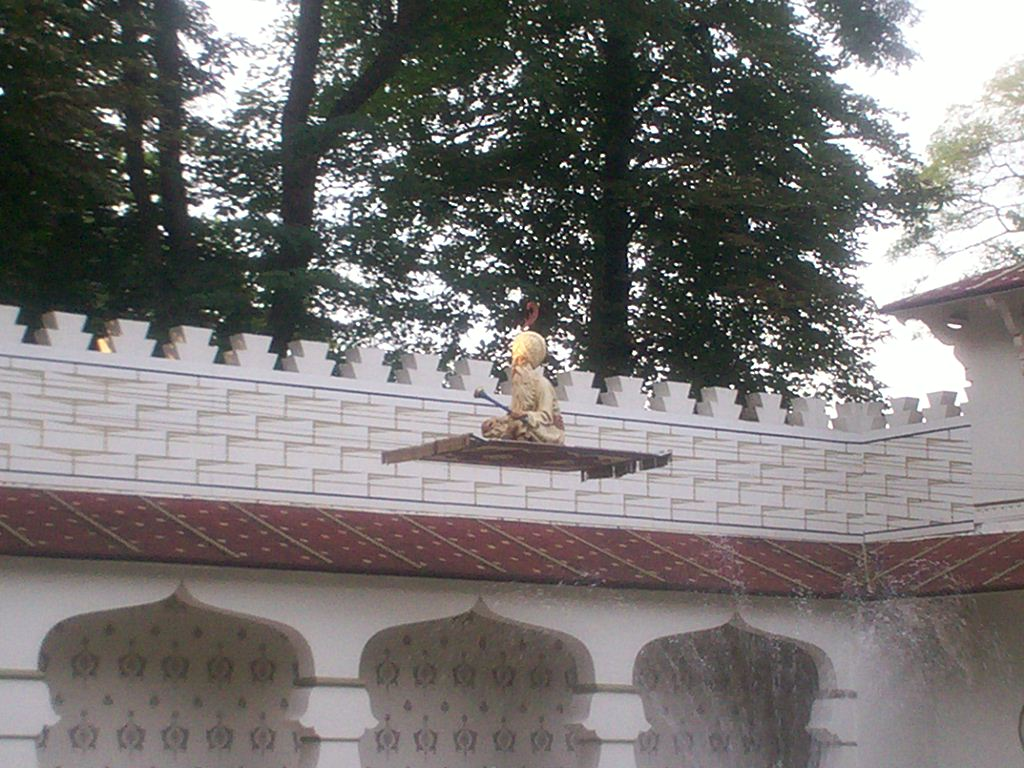
The Gardener and the Fakir

Designed by Pieck and Van de Ven as De Vliegende Fakir.

The story is staged in front of a building surrounded by an Indian tulip garden. The fakir appears in a window playing his flute, which makes the tulips grow. He then disappears and shows up in the tower with his magic carpet and flies to the other palace tower, using an ingenious system of discreet cables (developed by Peter Reijnders) which gives the illusion of a real levitation. He plays his flute again to open the tulips there, and in the meanwhile the other tulips close.

The color of the beard of the fakir went from black to white in 1987.

=== The Indian Water Lilies ===
Square with the Indrajit Temple Guards

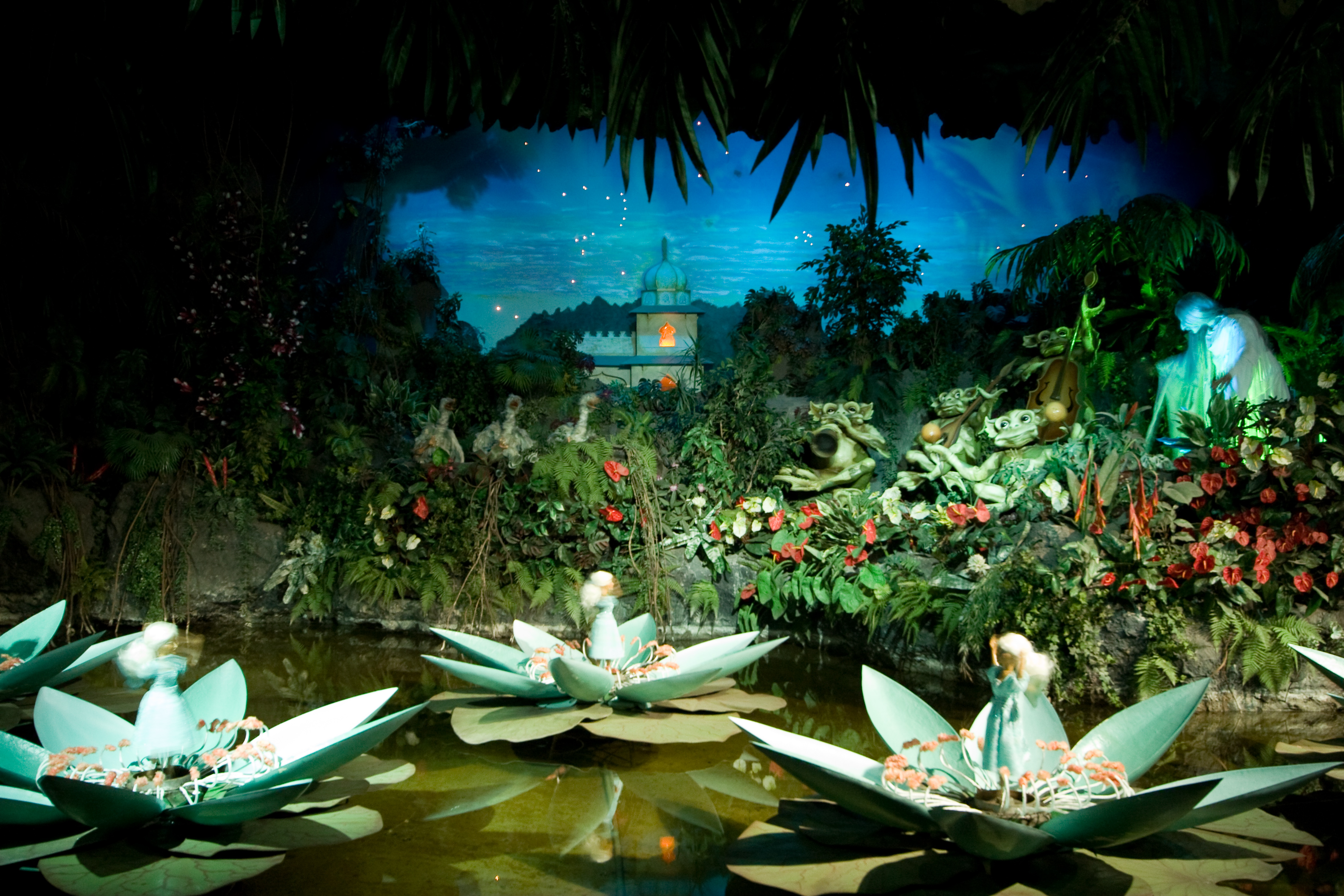
The witch's chant brings out the fairies

The Indian Water Lilies is a walk-through attraction. Visitors walk into the show area to experience the three-dimensional tale. It was the very first attraction that made use of advanced techniques to create an artificial, fairy tale-style environment. The consistency and style of the music, lighting, decorations and animatronics can be found in many other rides built later, like Spookslot, Fata Morgana and Droomvlucht.

Peter Reijnders wanted to create this ride to commemorate the 15th anniversary of Efteling, and went to the Royal Castle of Laeken at Laken for an audience with Queen Fabiola of Belgium. The queen agreed to let the Efteling use her story, which she had published in a book of fairy tales entitled Los doce cuentos maravillosos, on the condition that a contribution to charity was made.

One enters the ride by walking through a cave leading to an Indian temple square with a large fountain, Indian decorations and two Indrajit giants. Two large gates give access to a cavern leading to a subterranean jungle lake, enclosed by tropical plants, a creek and a roaring waterfall. After the introduction tale has been told, the appearance of the singing witch summons the fairies to dance on the water lilies, guided by the music of a frog orchestra and singing geese.

The principal musical theme for The Indian Water Lilies is “Afrikaan Beat” by Bert Kaempfert, but the ride starts with the Inca chant, “Taita Inty” (Virgin of the Sun God), taken from the album Voice of the Xtabay by Yma Sumac.

=== The Little Mermaid ===
The Little Mermaid made her appearance in 1970, designed by Anton Pieck. She holds a fish that spouts water out of its mouth. The music is the "Allegro Briljante" by François-Adrien Boieldieu. The mermaid was refurbished in 2001.

=== The Wolf and the Seven Kids ===
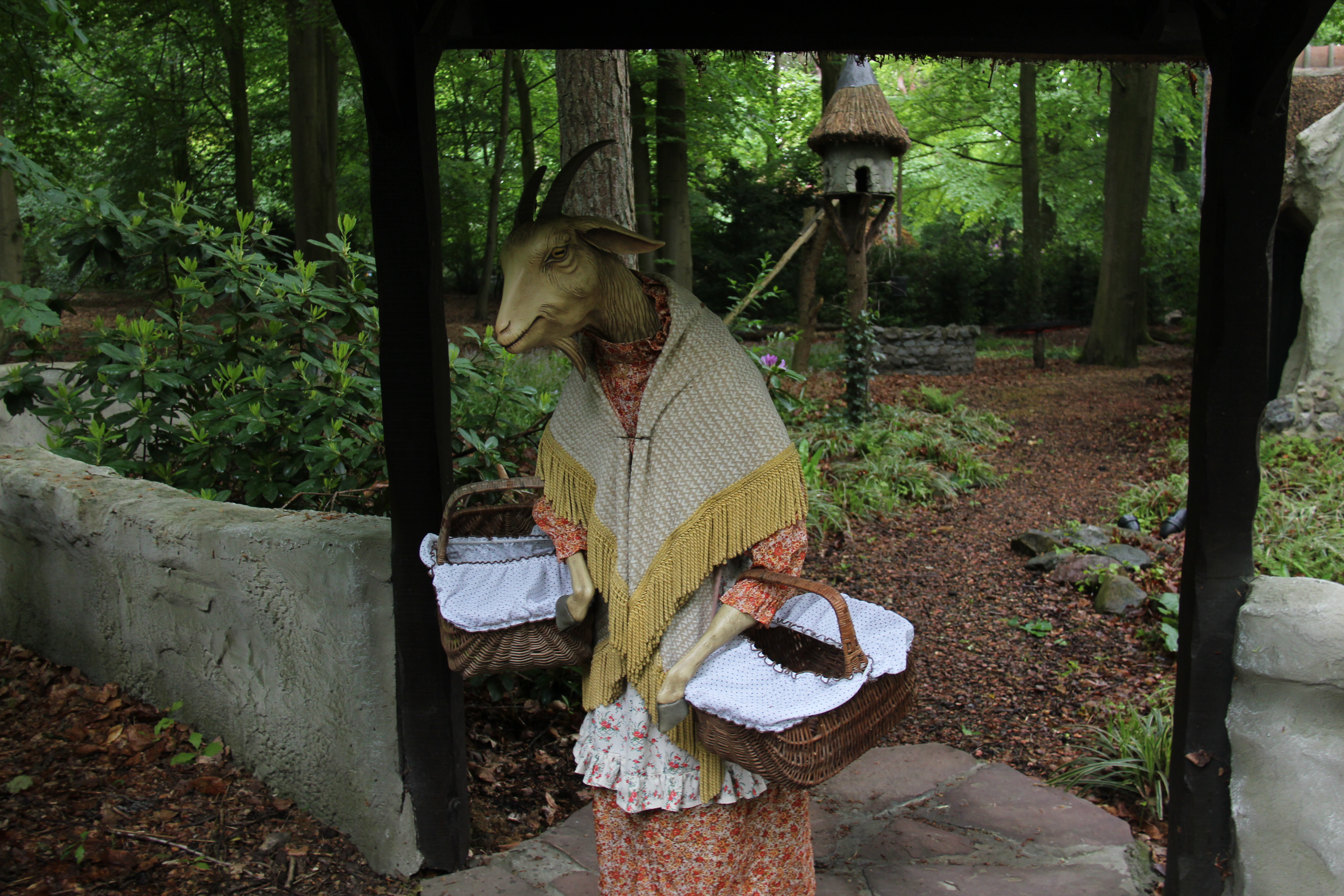
Outside of the house, Mother Goat goes out shopping, while the wolf stalks her little goats.

The Seven Little Goats was the last fairy tale to be added by Anton Pieck in 1973. One can look through the windows of the goats' house. It consists of a living room and a playing annex bedroom. Six of the little goats play the Game of the Goose on a special Efteling-board designed by Anton Pieck. The youngest goat hides in the big clock. The big bad wolf, dressed in a tuxedo, is at the front door. In 2002, a squirrel was added on top of the roof.

=== The Dragon ===
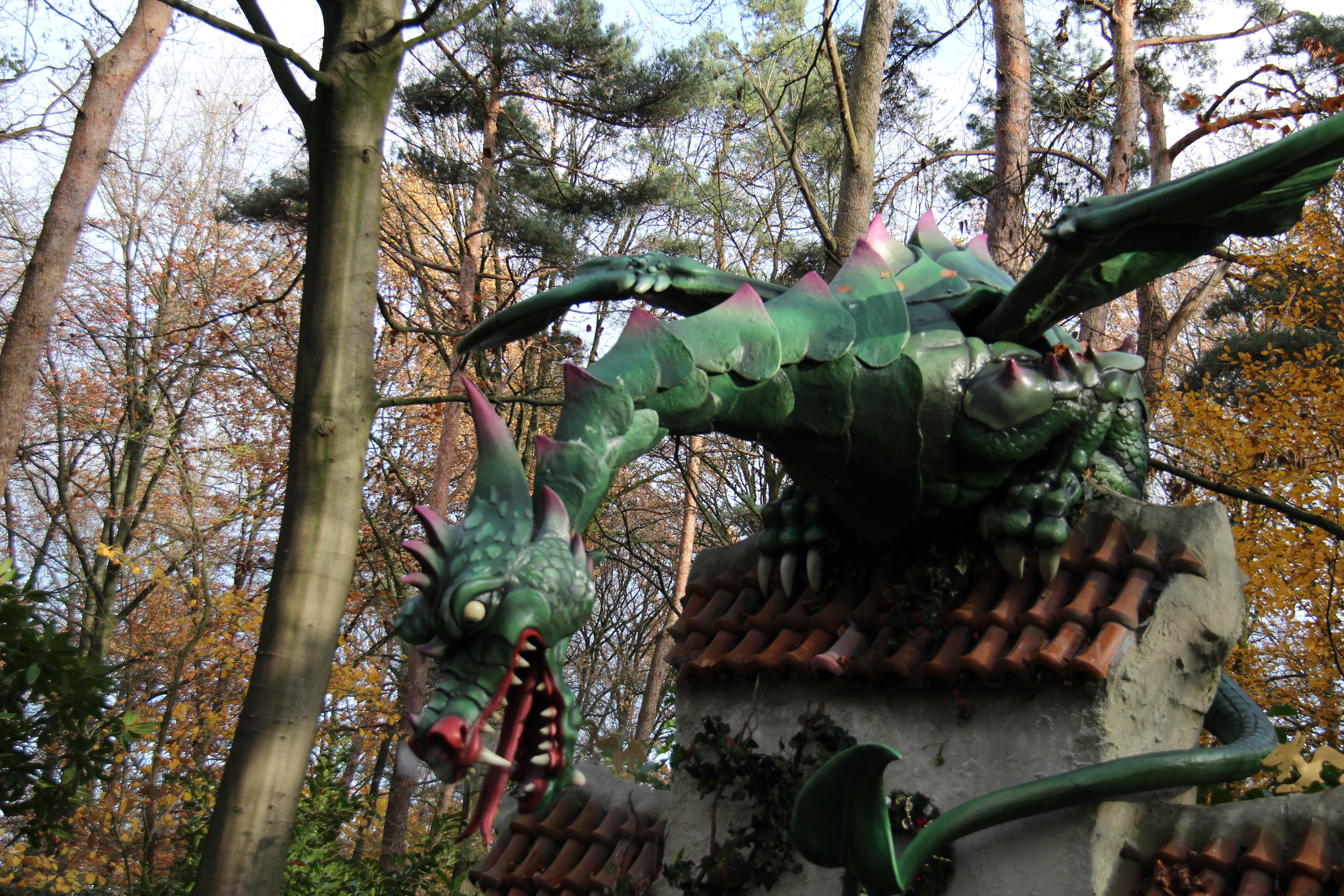
The Dragon attacks...

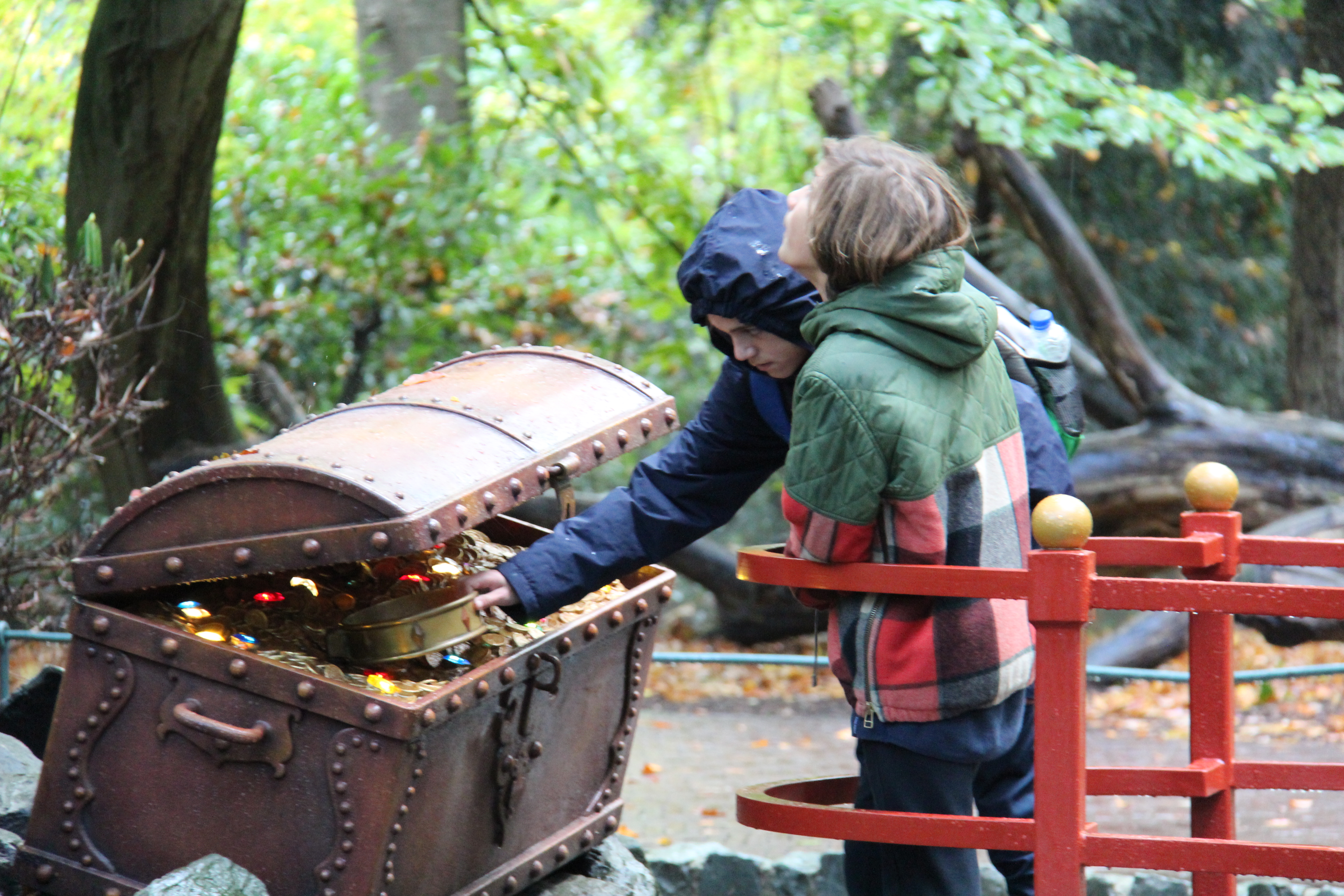
...when guests touch the treasure

The Dragon, designed by Anton Pieck and Ton van de Ven, was supposed to open on April 6, 1979. However, the movements of the dragon's neck and wings were too staccato, delaying the presentation until June 20, 1979. The dragon is about seven meters long, with a wing span of four meters, and it weighs about 1000 kg, making it the largest animatronic dragon of its time. If one tries to steal the crown from the treasure chest in front of the dragon, the dragon starts growling and moving fiercely. The dragon's sounds are a mix of the sounds of an angry gorilla and a hissing snake, taken from Essential Death And Horror Sound Effects Vol. 1 by BBC sound designer Steven Brown. In 2000, the dragon was upgraded to blow smoke out of its nostrils. The neck of the dragon has been shortened a few times. This was done because people could touch the dragon. There are no specific tales attached to the Dragon.

=== The Troll King ===
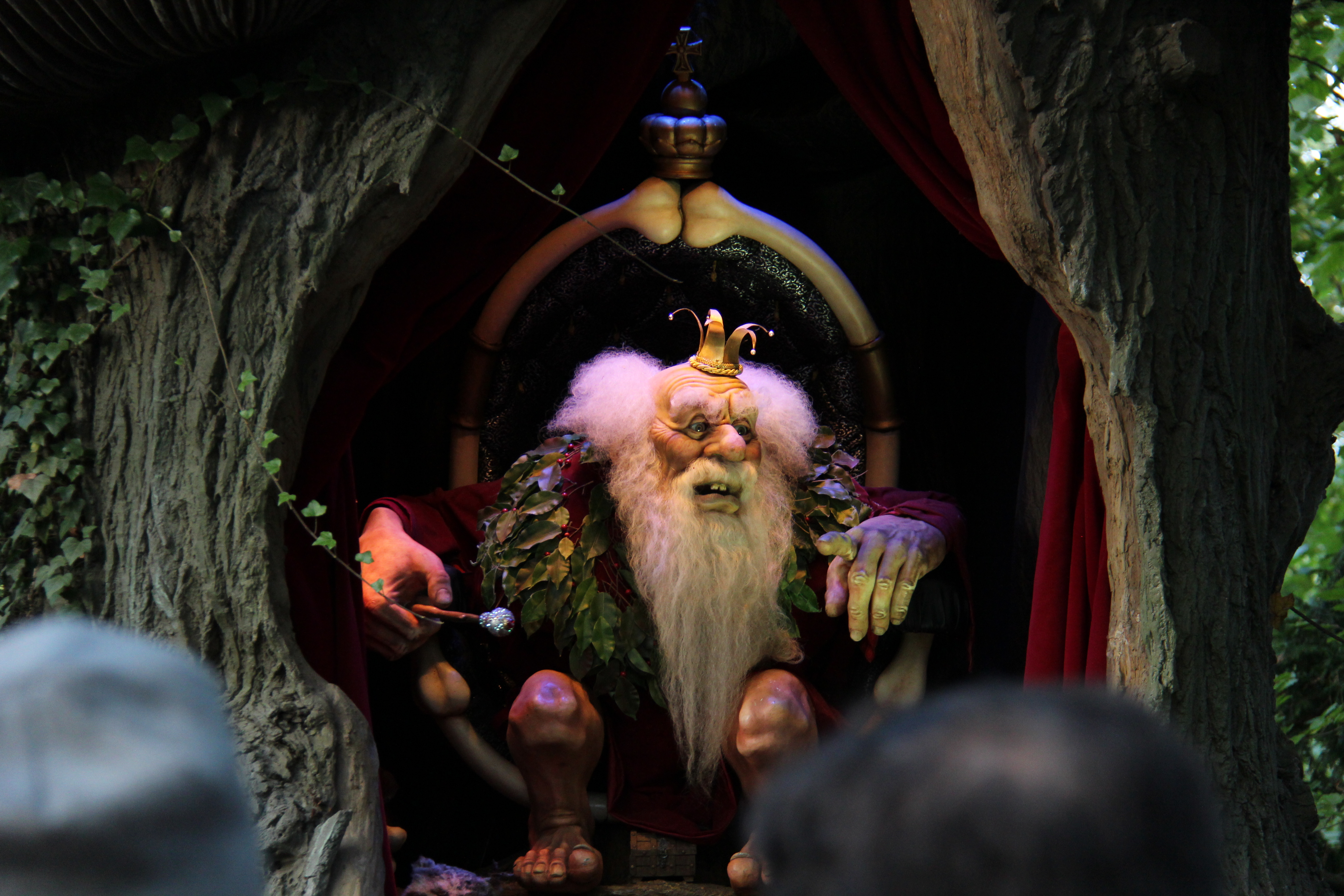
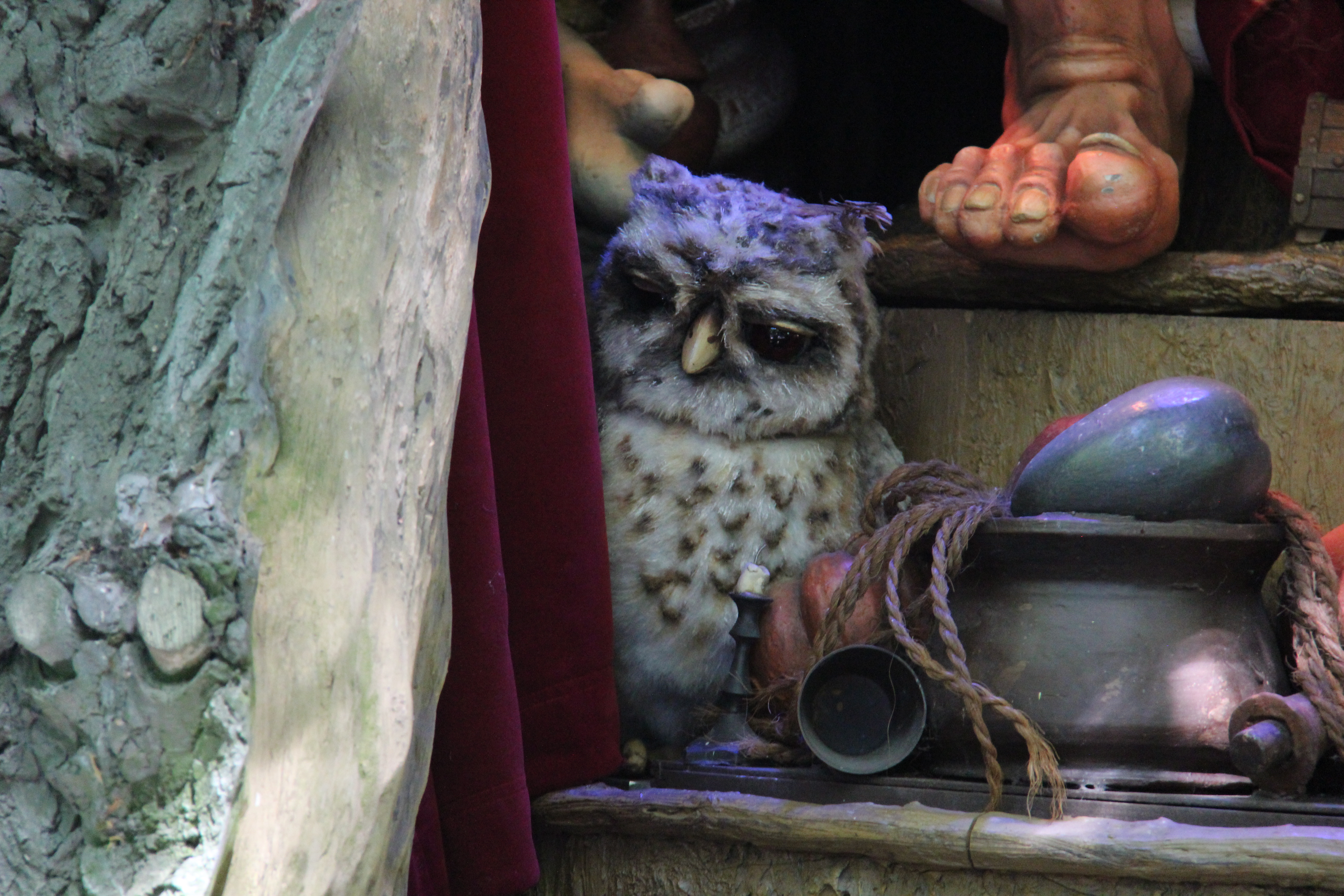
The Troll King on his throne in a tree

The animatronic Troll King entered Efteling in 1988, for a total cost of 2.6 million guilders. Although trolls are a widespread phenomenon in Scandinavian mythology, no particular tale is attached to the Troll King. The Scandinavian myths inspired Ton van de Ven, who had illustrated a Norwegian fairy tale book in 1974, to create this old, somewhat confused creature, sitting in a hollow tree, predicting the future of his visitors.

On a stone in front of the king, one can point at one of the twelve astrological signs at which the king will wake up and mumble some words. Together with Hugo of Villa Volta, the king is the most complex animatronic in Efteling. It was a collaboration of Ton van de Ven, TNO and Spitting Image. The animatronic can move 26 parts of its body, including eyebrows, eyes, jaws, back and wrists. Its voice is that of Peter van Ostade, who also composed the music for The People of Laaf.

=== Tom Thumb ===
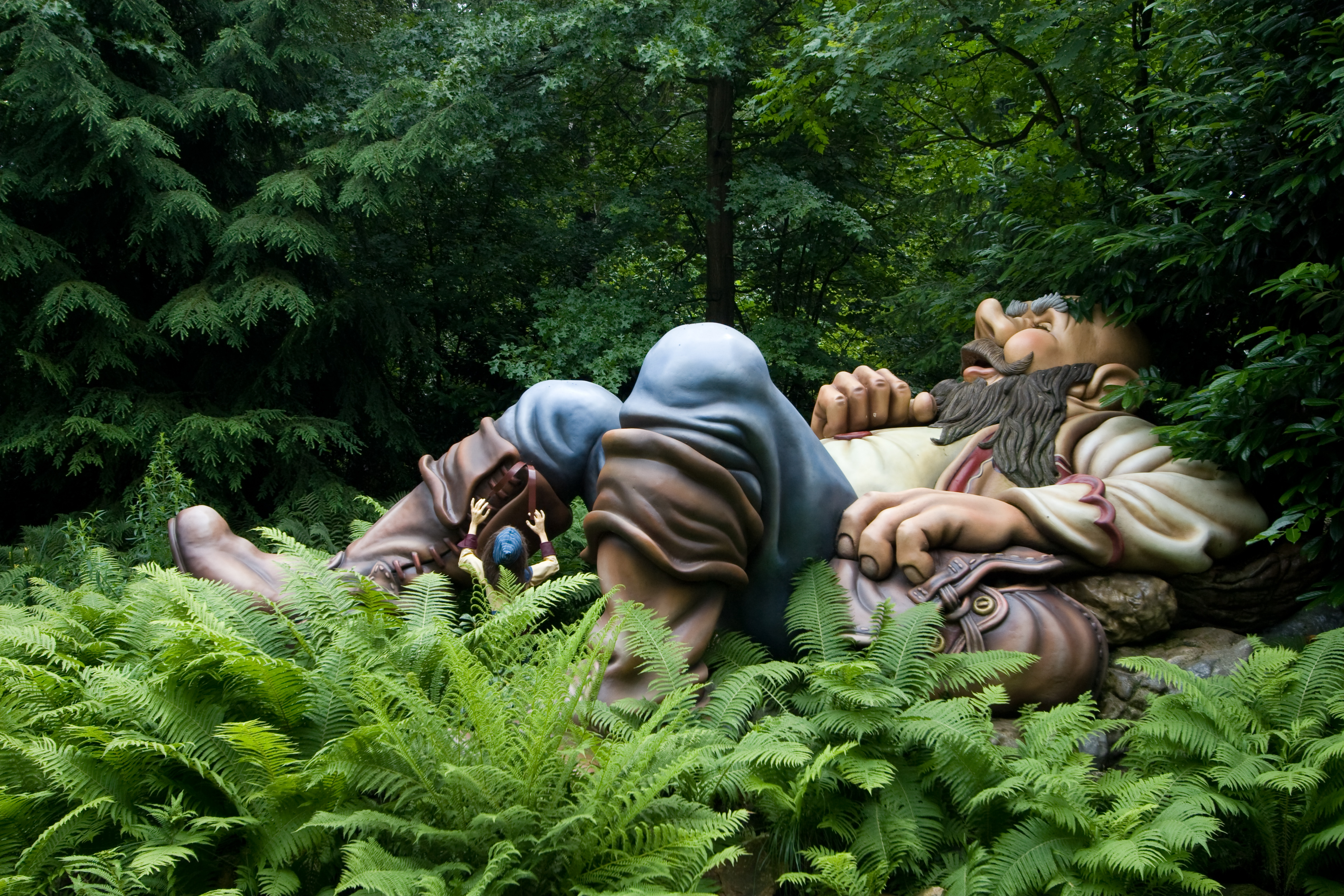
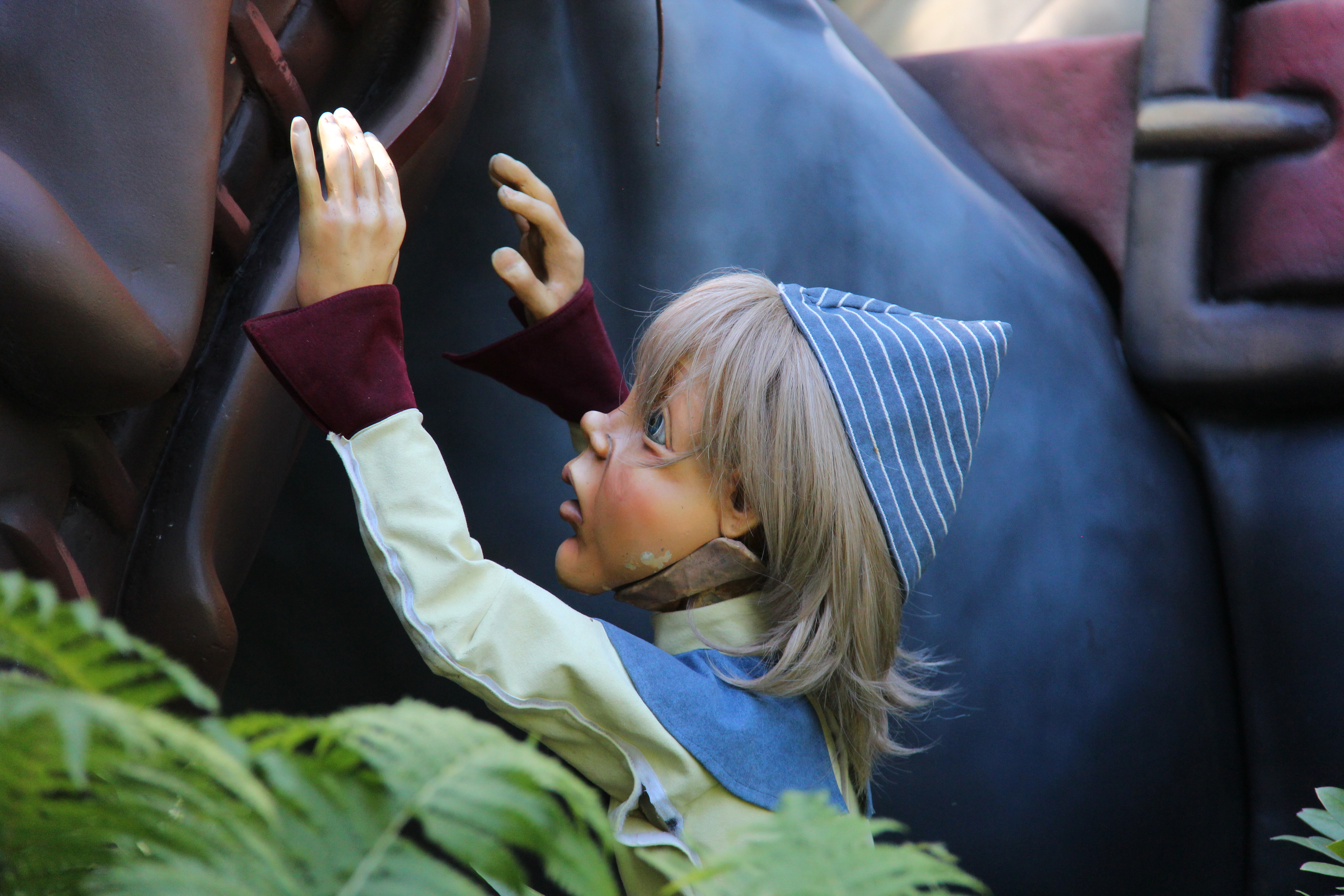
Tom Thumb

Based on the tale by Perrault, the scene was designed by Van de Ven as Klein Duimpje. In the scene, Tom Thumb is stealing the boot of the sleeping giant.

To call Tom Thumb, you have to call his name in a log.

=== Rumpelstiltskin ===
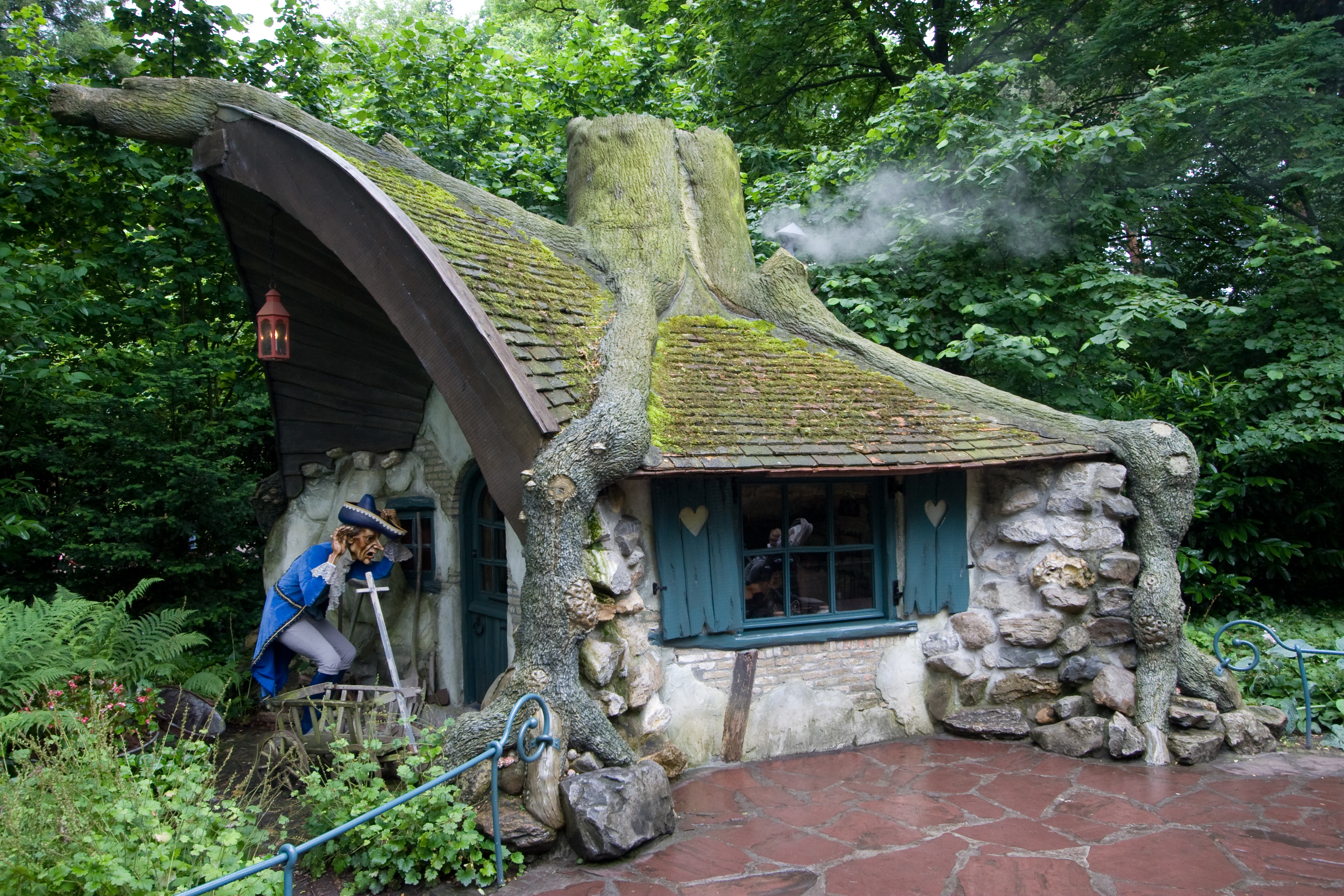
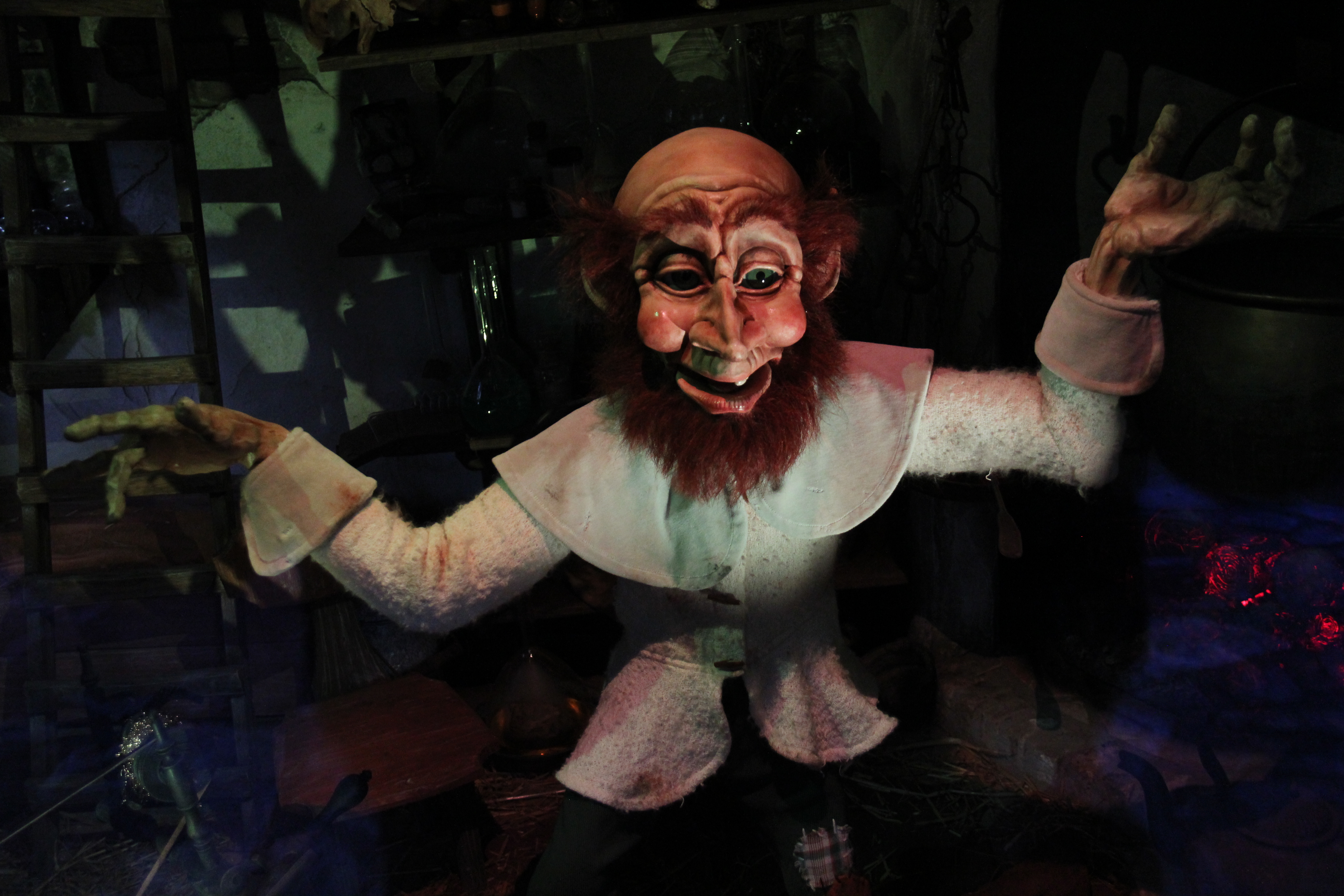
The soldier listens while Rumpelstiltskin reveals his name.

Based on the Grimm fairy tale, the scene was designed by Van de Ven as Repelsteeltje. Guests can look inside Rumpelstiltskin's house through a window while he reveals his name in a song:

Niemand weet, Niemand weet, Dat ik Repelsteeltje heet!

[Translation: "No one knows, no one knows, That my name is Rumpelstiltskin!"]

=== Rapunzel ===
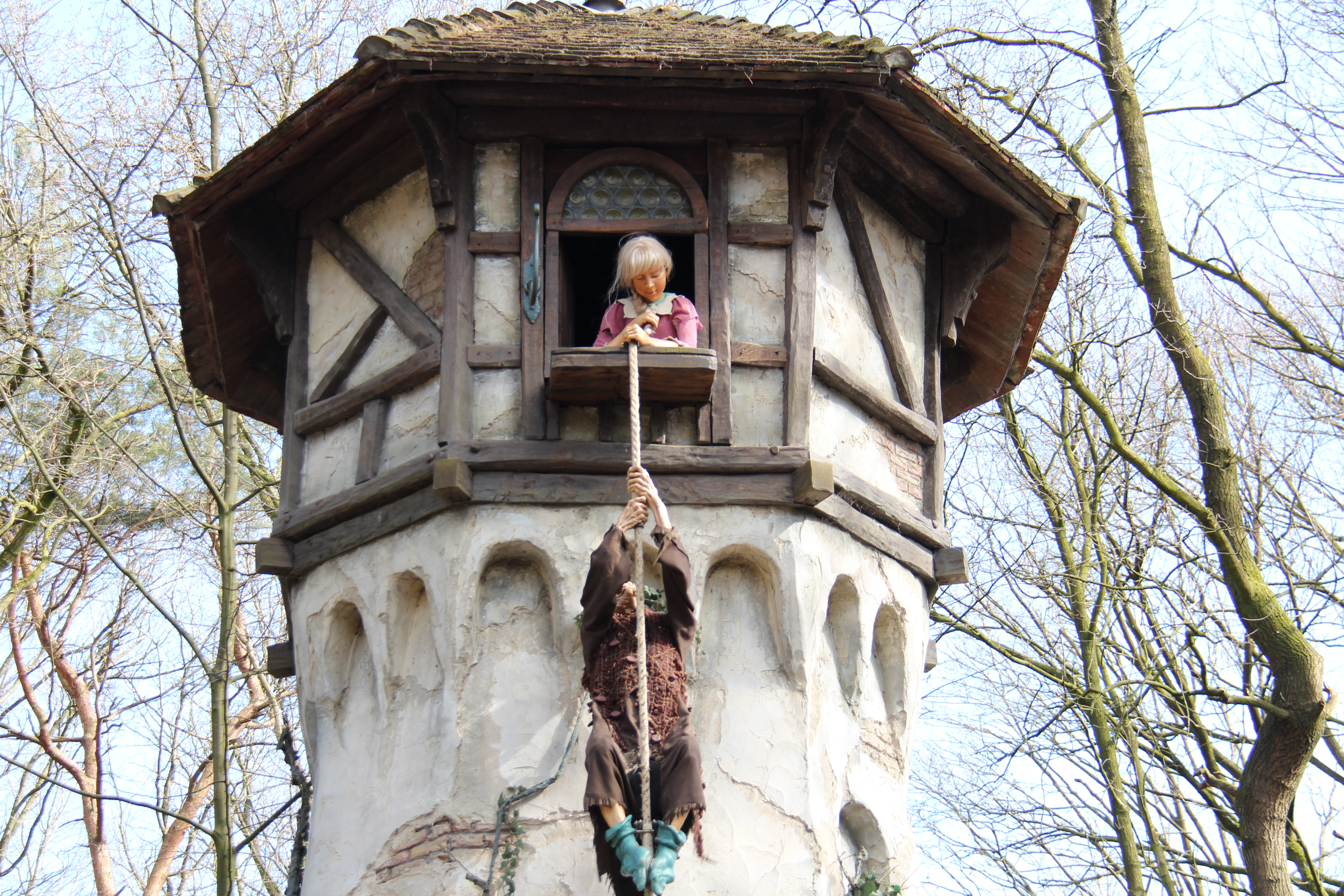
The witch climbing down Rapunzel's hair

On May 18, 2001, Rapunzel made her appearance in Efteling in a 10-meter-high (33 ft) tower. A witch climbs Rapunzel's long hair 7 meters before she climbs down again. The scene was designed by Ton van de Ven, who was inspired by towers from the Middle Ages. The story is told by Wieteke van Dort; the witch's sounds are by Robert-Jaap Jansen, an Efteling designer.

To create some publicity for the official opening, Efteling organized a contest to find the girl with the longest hair from the Netherlands, Belgium, Germany and the UK. The winner was Patty Gisbers-Jenniskens from Heteren with a braid of 172 centimeters. The Flemish winner, Katalin Willems, cut her 134 cm long braid later that year and donated her braid to Efteling.

=== The Little Match Girl ===
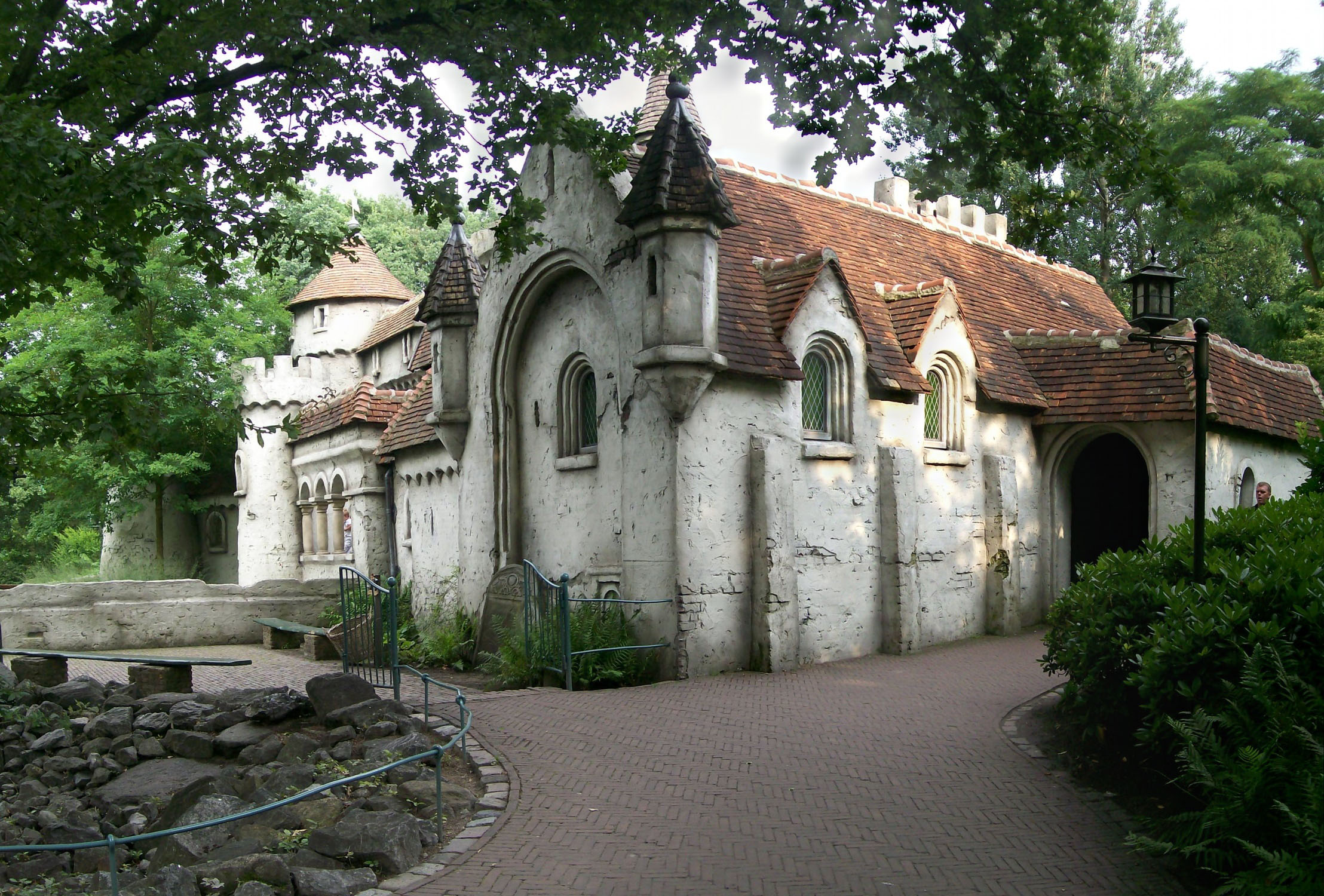
The Little Match Girl. The outside of the fairy tale building

Based on the tale by Hans Christian Andersen, the scene was designed by Michel den Dulk as Het Meisje met de Zwavelstokjes.

This tale opened during the Winter Efteling in 2004 for the 200th anniversary of the birth of Hans Christian Andersen. It had cost approximately €1,300,000 and is set up as a walkthrough using special effects, such as holographs, and animatronics.

=== Cinderella ===
This classic fairy tale was brought to life by Karel Willemen and entered into the park scene in 2009. It was designed as Assepoester. The scene takes place inside Cinderella's stepmother's house. In the garden, the grave of Cinderella's real mother is seen, with a tree hanging over it. The visitors enter the mansion, where they can watch through a window and look into a dark room, where birds are eating beans and a large music box stands in the middle. During the story, various elements make noise or are shown with a spotlight. These include a door, where visitors see the shadows of the stepsisters, complaining about Cinderella, and the music box, inside of which figures of Cinderella and the prince are dancing. Then two animatronics of Cinderella and the prince are shown, with the prince fitting the glass slipper on Cinderella. Finally, two doors behind the pair open up, revealing a distant castle and a carriage traveling toward it.

=== The Fairy Tale Tree ===
In 2008, Efteling began to build an interactive tree, De Sprookjesboom, designed by Pim-Martijn Sanders and Karel Willemen, in the Fairy Tale Forest based on the character from their animated TV series Sprookjesboom, but the plan was unexpectedly shelved until July 2009, opening only on April 1, 2010. The tree is a wise old oak, which can speak and tell stories, typically about the other inhabitants of the Sprookjesbos. It consists of 1,500 branches and 50,000 sheets. The tree has several effects besides speaking: his whole structure - trunk, branches, leaves - move. It is home to several small animatronics, such as a squirrel, a woodpecker, a spider and talking mushrooms. The old oak is located opposite The Little Match Girl, and is a structure 13 meters wide and 13 meters high.

=== The Emperor's New Clothes ===
The Emperor's New Clothes, designed as De Nieuwe kleren van de Keizer, opened in fall 2012. It is an outdoor fairy tale, and partly uses shadow puppetry to tell the tale. When the emperor is carried to his palace naked, a fountain is used to hide his private parts, which is a comical addition to the attraction.

When the fairy tale opened, it was voiced by Toos van de Voorde-Verdult. In December 2012, Toos' voice was replaced by Paul van Vliet.

=== Pinocchio ===
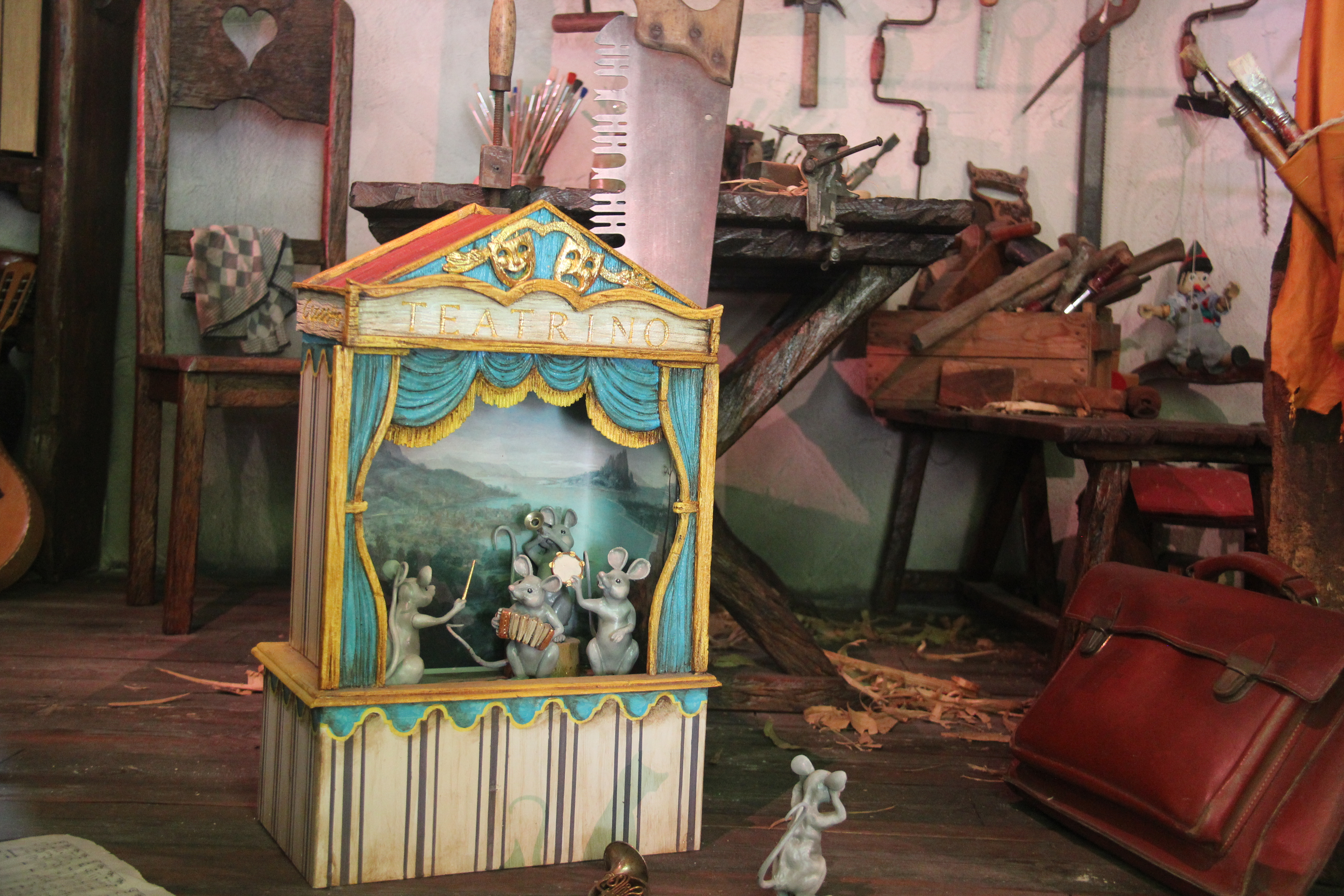
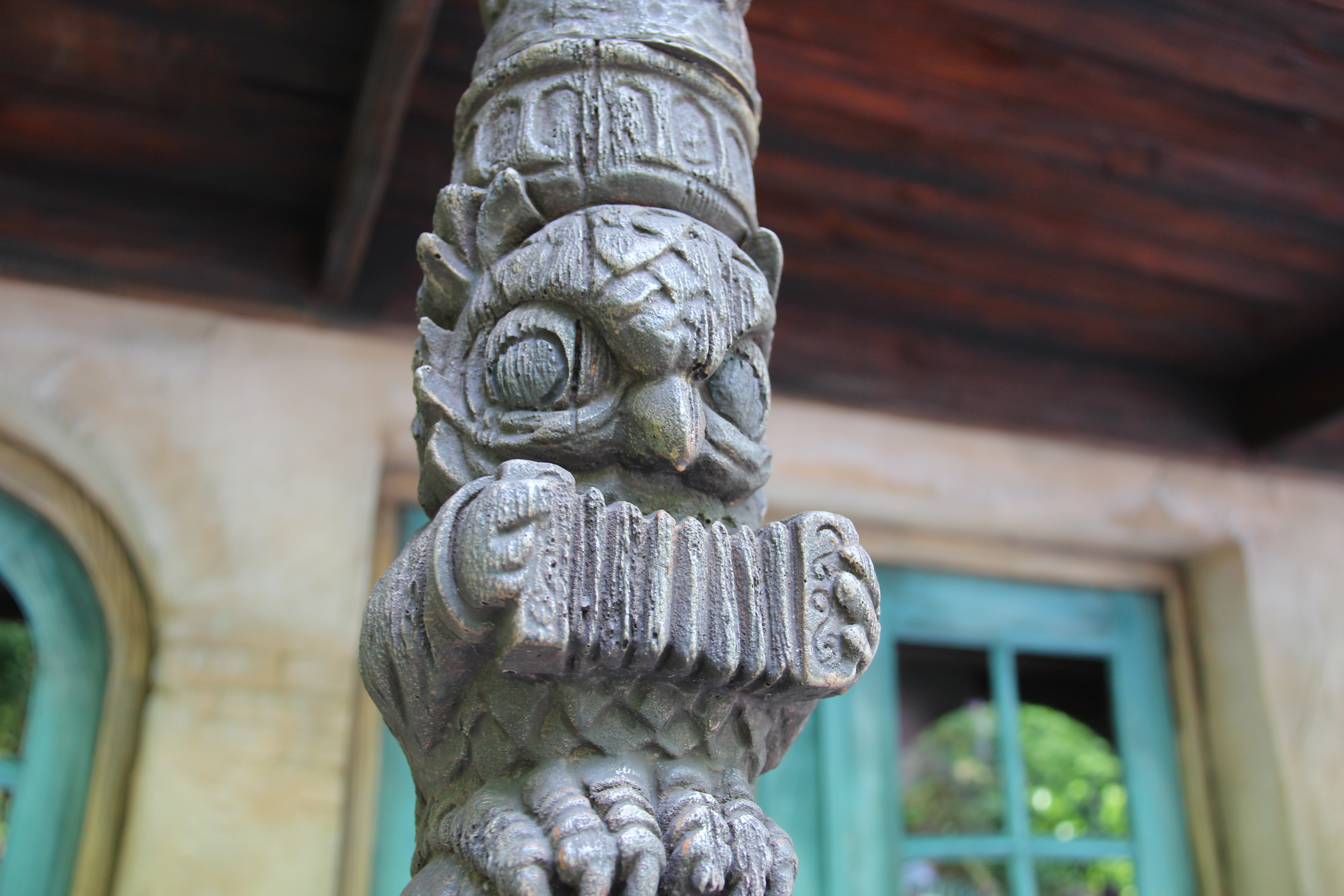
Geppetto's shop

The fairytale which was revealed to the public on 24 March 2016 depicts the story of the puppet who becomes a boy. In fairytale forest Geppetto's shop (designed as "la bottega di Geppetto) is shown desolate and with a note which informs the reader that Geppetto has left his home looking for Pinocchio. A few meters to the left of the shop the visitors can see monstrous fish which has devoured both Geppetto and Pinocchio who are visible when it opens its mouth.

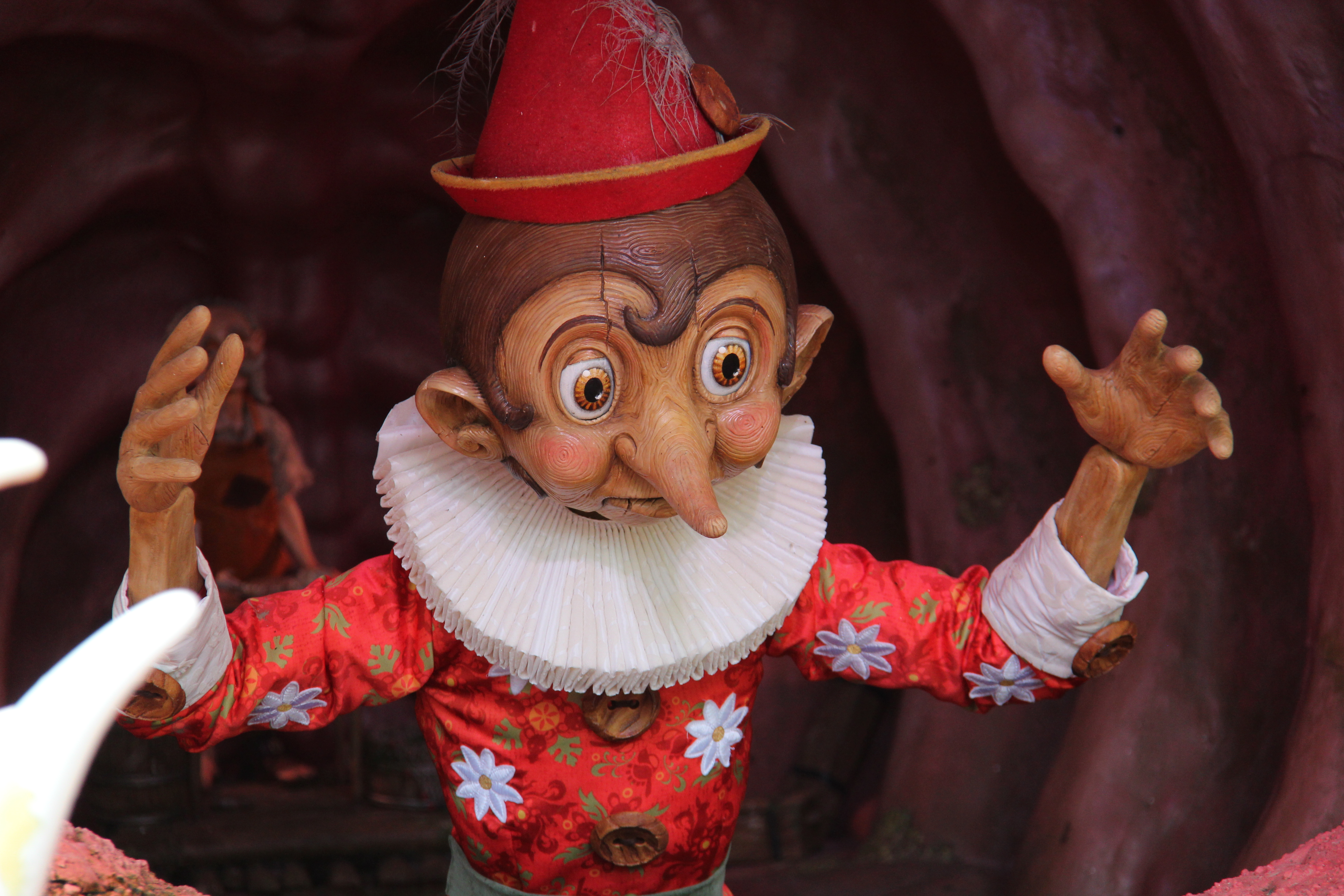
Pinocchio

The fairy tale was created by the Efteling in association with the 'Fondazione Nazionale Carlo Collodi', an organisation from the city of Collodi which tries to promote the story of Pinocchio. Because of this the fairy tale has typical Italian influences.

From 2015 till 2016, a 'Pinocchio' musical was performed in the Efteling theatre to promote the fairy tale that would open around the same time.

=== The Six Swans ===
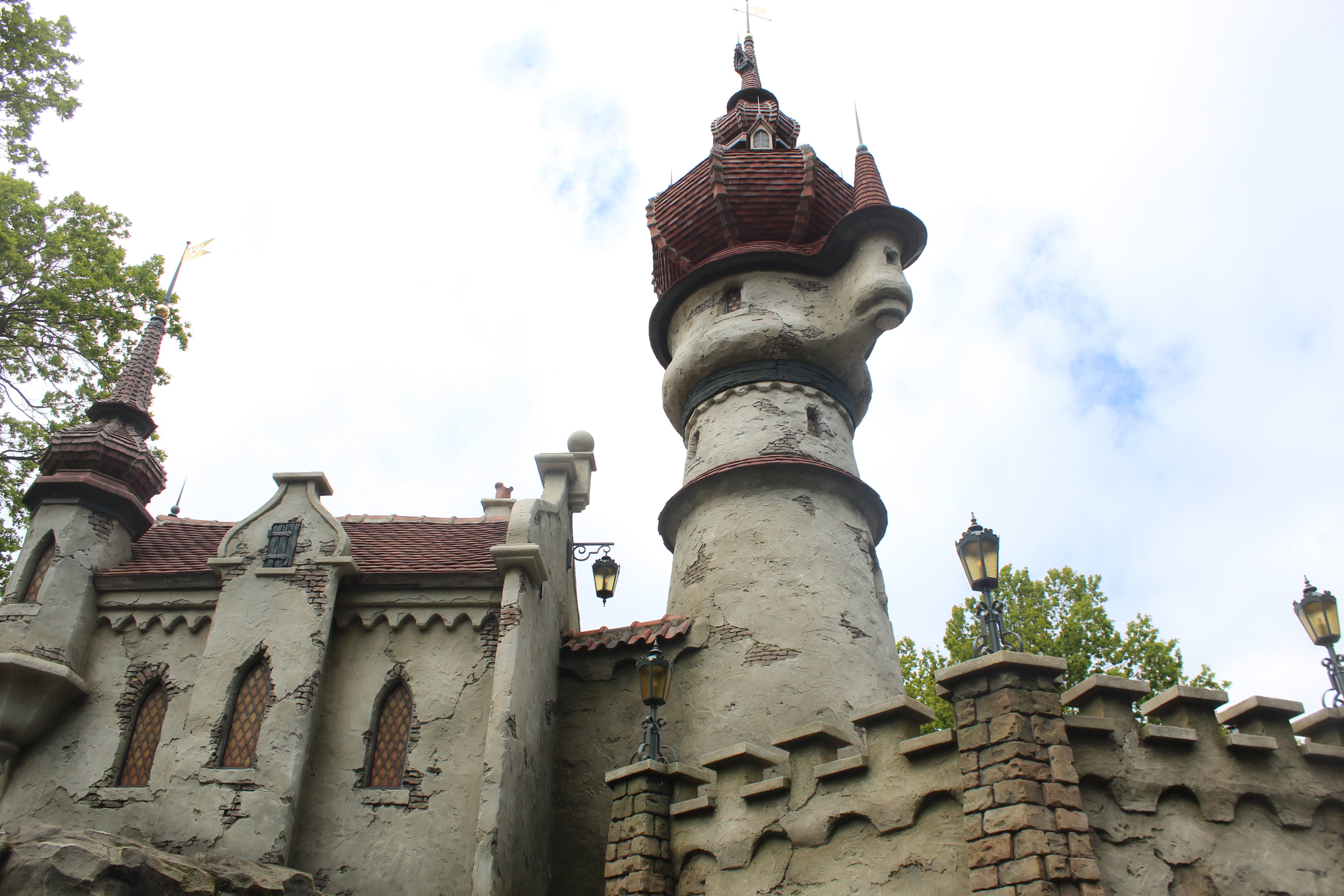
The Six Swans

The Six Swans, designed by Sander de Bruijn as De zes Zwanen, opened in fall 2019. It is the first true ride within the Fairytale Forest, with guests being able to ride one of six swan boats into the castle to see Princess Elisa at work on the shirts needed to break the spell cast on her brothers.

=== The Princess and the Pea ===
The Princess and the Pea, or De Prinses op de Erwt, opened on May 14, 2025. Located in a gazebo in the shadow of the Efteling Grand Hotel, the Princess and the Pea features a musical narration sung by Geike Arnaert.

== Other Fairytale Forests ==
- Phantasialand also had a fairy tale forest (called the Märchenwald) but it was demolished on 8 October 2007.
- Hong Kong Disneyland also opened an attraction called Fairy Tale Forest; it opened to the public on 17 December 2015.
- Europa-Park also has a fairy tale forest.
- Fairy Tale Forest in Oak Ridge, New Jersey, US opened in 1957. After closing for a short time in 2003, the park has reopened to the public.
- Idlewild and Soak Zone in Ligonier Pennsylvania opened their “Storybook Forest” in 1956.
