= Diorama (disambiguation) =

A diorama is a 19th-century theatrical device or modern three-dimensional model.

Diorama can also refer to:

- Diorama (Silverchair album), 2002
- Diorama (Kenshi Yonezu album), 2012
- Diorama (band), a German electropop band
- Diorama, Goiás, a town in Goiás state, Brazil
- Diorama (Efteling), an attraction in Efteling amusement park in the Netherlands
- Diorama effect, miniature faking of a photograph
- The Diorama, Regent's Park, a defunct London theatre built in 1823 to show large tableaux paintings

== See also ==
- Dierama
