= PandaVision =

4D film formerly shown at Efteling

Coordinates: 51°38′55″N 5°02′48″E

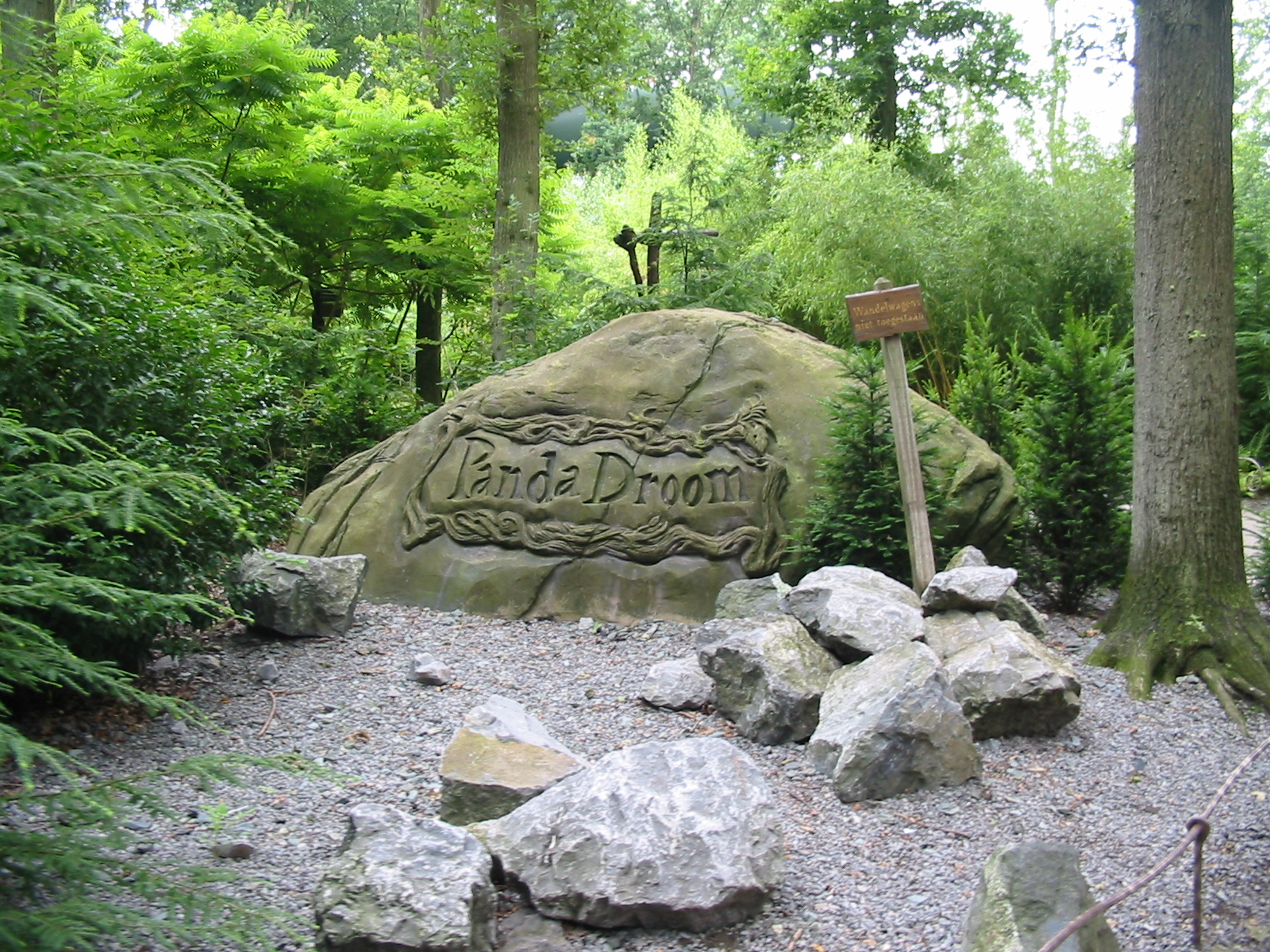
Sign at ride entrance

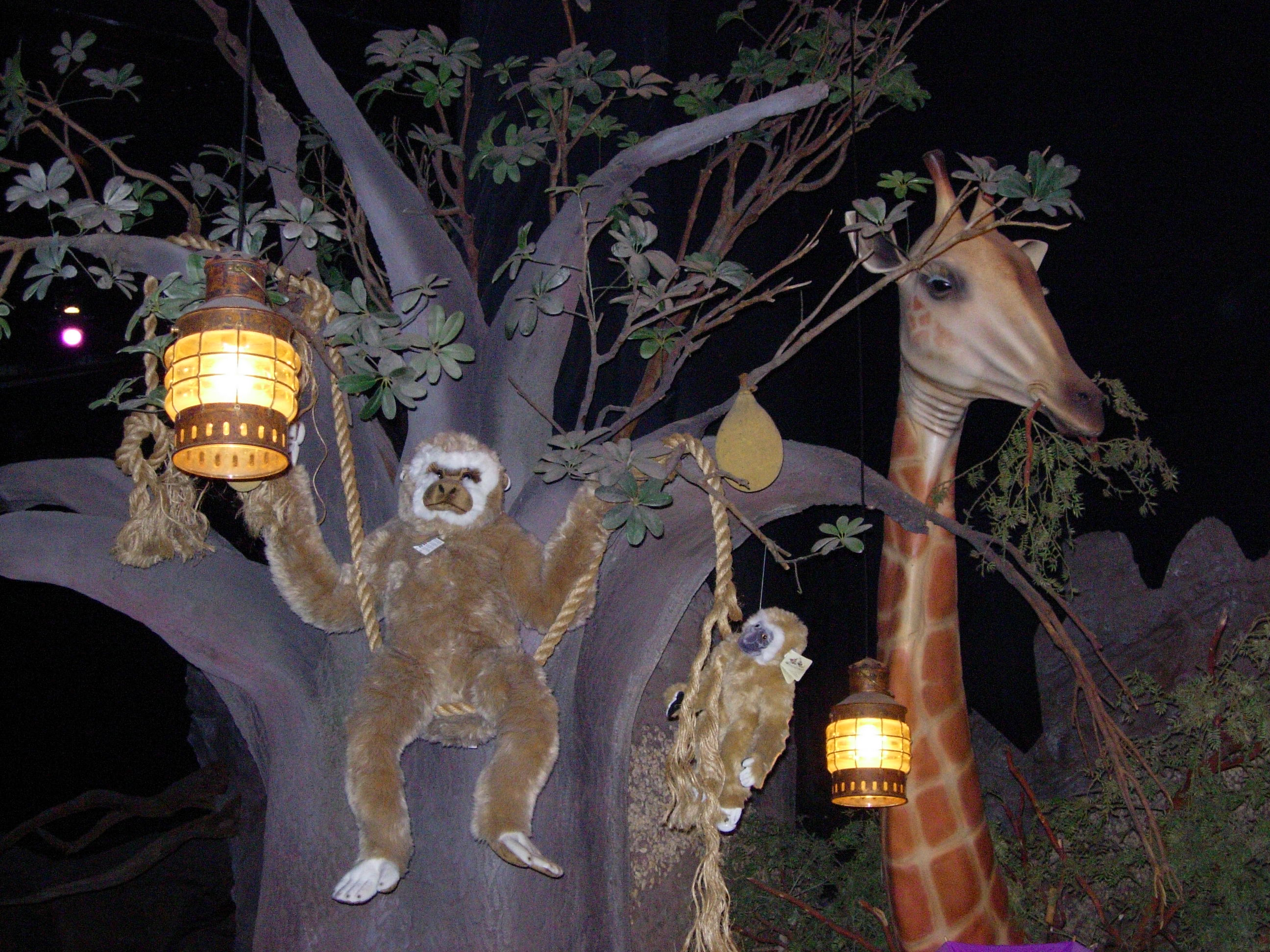
Indoor playground

PandaVision (Dutch: PandaDroom, lit. 'PandaDream') was a 4D film and attraction in the Dutch theme park Efteling. It was opened in 2002, in collaboration with the World Wide Fund for Nature (WWF), in celebration of Efterling's 50th anniversary. It closed in 2019, and was replaced with Fabula.
