= Peter Reijnders =

Dutch film director (1900–1974)

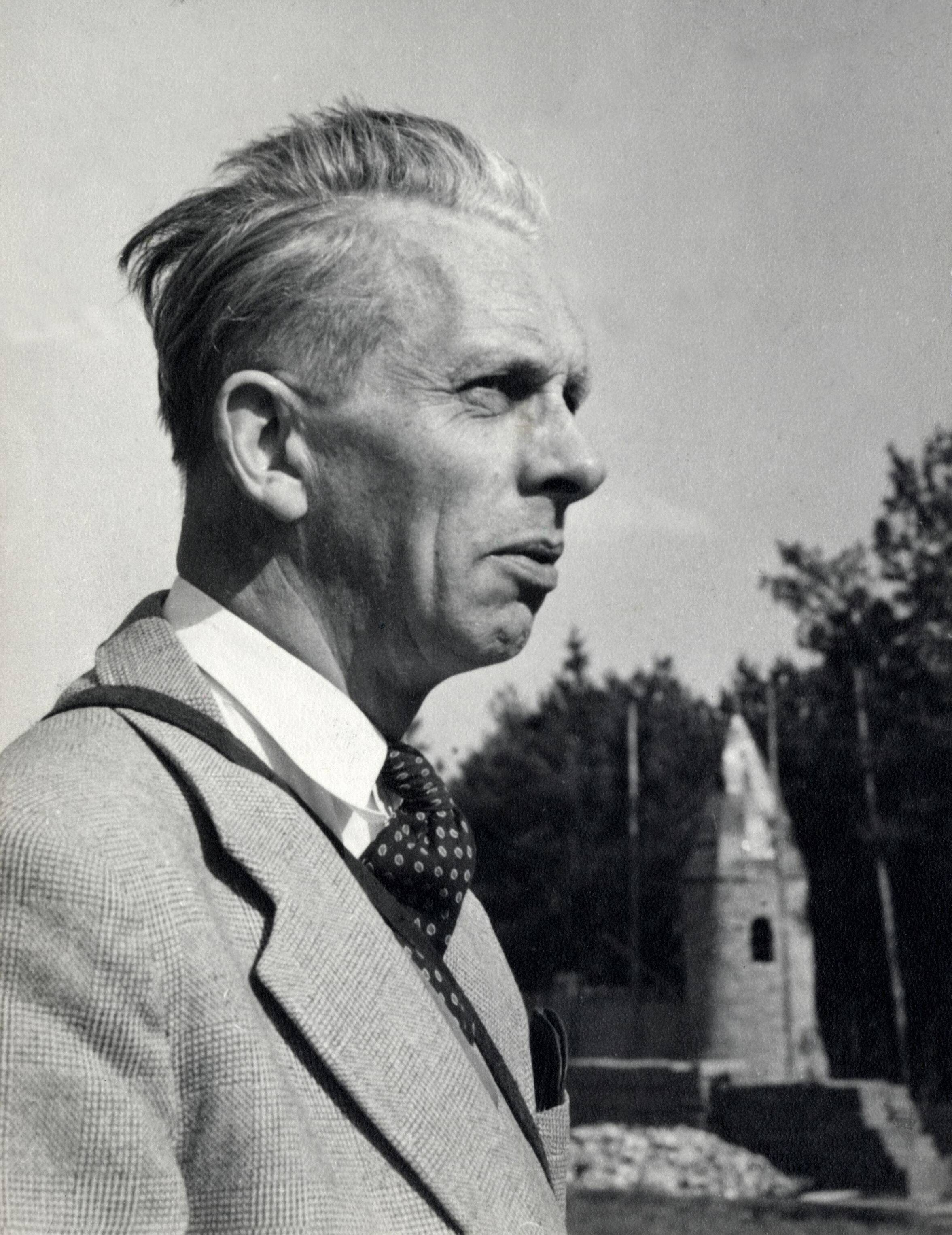
Peter Reijnders, around 1952

Petrus Lambertus Wilhelmus (Peter) Reijnders (24 July 1900 – 1974) was a Dutch photographer, film director and inventor. He is best known for his crucial role in founding the theme park Efteling.

Peter Reijnders was born in 1900 in 's-Hertogenbosch as the son of a coffee- and tobacco trader family. After making a film in 1927 about his own marriage with Helena Perquin, he devoted himself to photography and films. He also invented many small novelties that are popular with Philips Electronics.

He made a number of films in the period 1927-1954, some of which gained national prizes.

== Efteling ==
At a family gathering in 1951, Reijnders was asked by his father-in-law, mayor Van der Heijden, to investigate the possibilities for making the just-established Efteling Naturepark more attractive. Inspired by a temporary fairy tale exhibition in Eindhoven, Reijnders knew whom to ask for the design: painter Anton Pieck.

Reijnders and Pieck collaborated on the development of the original Fairy Tale Forest, which opened in 1952. Pieck was responsible for the artistic designs, while Reijinders developed technical effects using sound, music, and movement to animate the attractions. Their approach used technology to support the presentation of the stories while trying to keep the mechanisms that did so from the attention of visitors.

His last visit to Efteling was in 1972, when the park received the Pomme d'Or, the highest award in the European tourist industry.

== Filmography ==
Peter Reijnders directed at least 58 films, below is a small selection of noteworthy titles.

- Onze 'T'-Rouwdag (1927)
- Camera Avontuur (1933), first prize Nationale Kinowedstrijd, second prize Concours International.
- Stormy Weather (1934), first prize Nationale Kinowedstrijd.
- Ships that pass in the night (1935), first prize Nationale Kinowedstrijd.
- Eindhoven Journaal (1935)
- Happy and Contented (1935)
- Thriller (1937), first prize Nationale Kinowedstrijd.
- Bevrijding Eindhoven (1944)
- Het Meisje en de Pop (1947)
- In Brabant groeit een Stad (1947–1954)
- Officiële Opening Van Doorne's Automobielfabriek (1950)
- De Efteling in het Hart van Brabant (1956/1958 en 1971)
- Beginjaren TH Eindhoven (1956–1958)

== Sources ==
- Smit, Rob (1990) Peter Reijnders 1900-1974. Eindhoven: SST Producties.
- Vanden Diepstraten, H. (2002) De Efteling. Kroniek van een Sprookje. Baarn: Tirion Uitgevers.
