= Efteling =

Theme park in the Netherlands

- Logo used since 2015

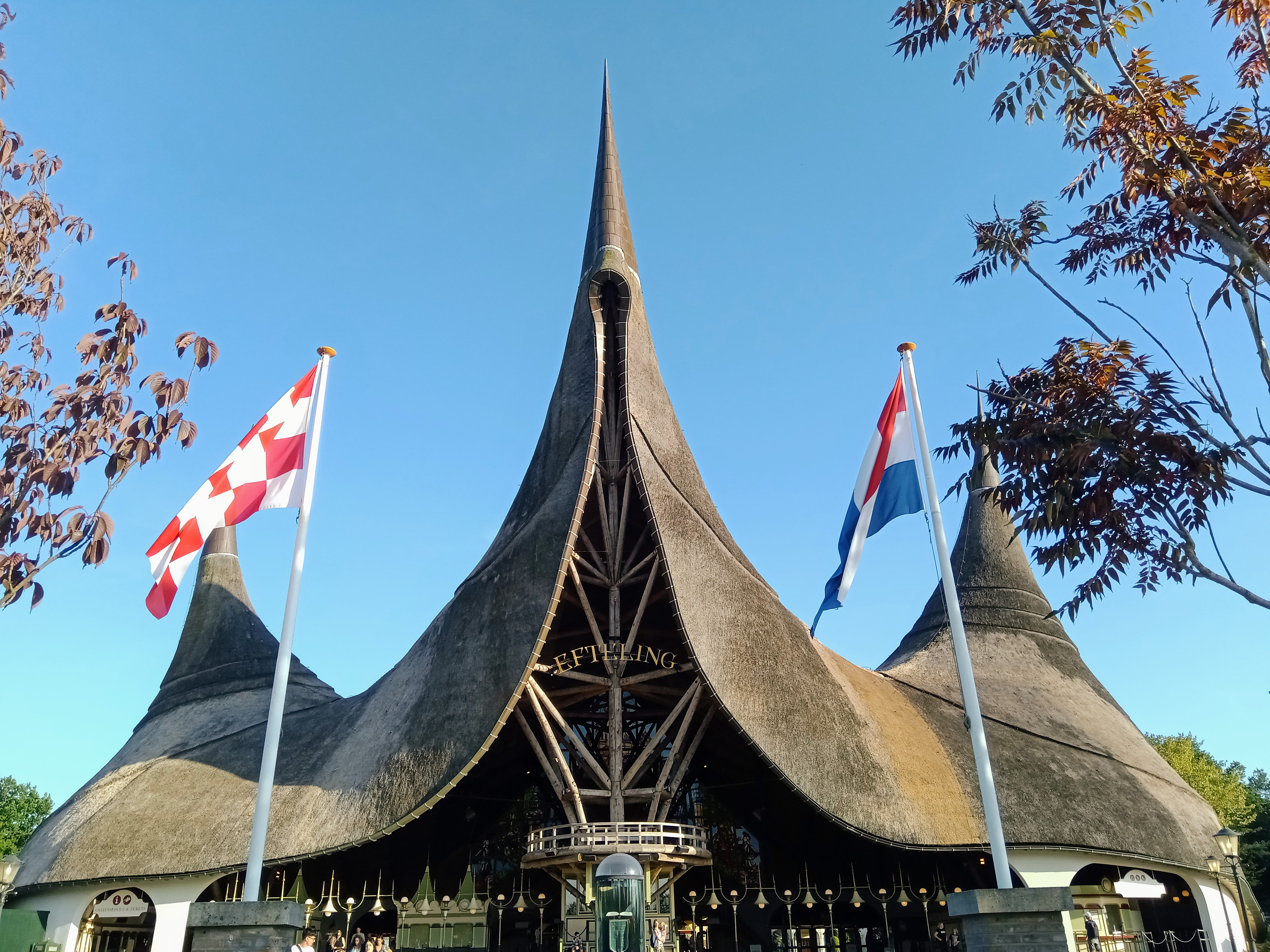
- The House of the Five Senses, the entrance to the Efteling theme park
- Interactive map of Efteling
- Location: Kaatsheuvel, Netherlands
- Coordinates: 51°39′01″N 5°02′53″E
- Opened: May 11, 1951; 75 years ago (Nature park); May 31, 1952; 74 years ago (Fairytale Forest)
- Owner: Efteling Nature Park Foundation
- Theme: Fantasy - ancient legends, mythology, fables, folklore and fairy tales
- Operating season: Year-round
- Attendance: 5,780,000 (2025)
- Area: 72 ha (720,000 m^{2}) (park); 276 ha (2,760,000 m^{2}) (resort); 400 ha (4,000,000 m^{2}) (total)

Attractions
- Total: 62 (including Fairytale Forest)
- Roller coasters: 6 (8 including both tracks of Joris en de Draak and Max & Moritz)
- Water rides: 4
- Other rides: 4
- Website: www.efteling.com

Efteling is a fantasy-themed theme park in Kaatsheuvel, a town in the Netherlands. The attractions reflect elements from ancient European myths and legends, fairy tales, fables, and folklore.

The park was opened on May 31, 1952. It evolved from a nature park with a playground and a Fairytale Forest into a full-sized theme park. It now caters to both children and adults with its cultural, romantic, and nostalgic themes, in addition to its wide array of amusement rides including six roller coasters and five dark rides.

It is the largest theme park in the Netherlands and one of the oldest theme parks in the world. It is twice as large as the original Disneyland park in the United States and predates it by three years. Annually, the park has more than 5 million visitors. In 2020, due to differences in pandemic policy, it was the most visited theme park in Europe, ahead of Disneyland Park. In 2019 and 2022, it was the third most visited theme park in Europe, after Disneyland Park, Paris, and Europa-Park, Germany. In 2025, the resort achieved a revenue of €347 million with a gross profit of €27.2 million.

== History ==
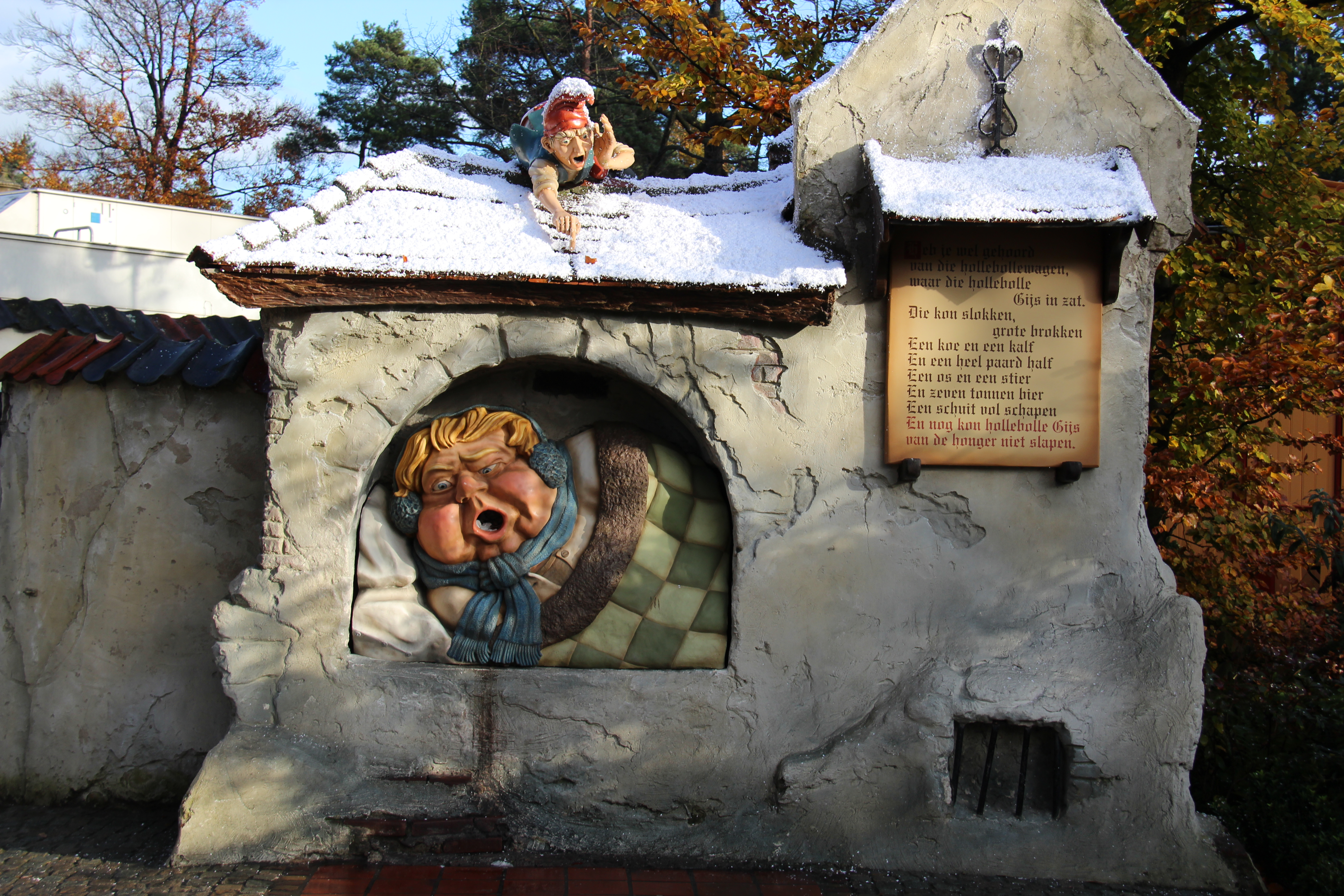
Paper gobbler Hollow Bulging Gijs – classic Pieck design

Efteling is one of the oldest theme parks still in existence. Its roots go when the R. K. Sport en Wandelpark was inaugurated.

In 1950, Efteling Nature Park Foundation (Stichting Natuurpark de Efteling) was founded by the mayor of Loon op Zand, R.J. van der Heijden, filmmaker Peter Reijnders, and designer artist Anton Pieck (1895-1987). The foundation was named after a 16th-century farm named Ersteling. Efteling officially opened on May 31, 1952, when the Fairy Tale Forest (het Sprookjesbos), designed by Anton Pieck, was opened to the public. Initially, the Fairy Tale Forest was home to some 10 different fairy tales, all of them brought to life using original drawings by Pieck alongside mechanics, lighting and sound effects designed by Reijnders. Efteling welcomed 240,000 visitors in 1952 alone.

Since 1978, the park has been expanded and grown to become one of the most popular theme parks in the world. In the same year, English singer Kate Bush performed in the park in De Efteling Special, which was broadcast on 11 May 1978. In early 1978, the park's Haunted Castle was completed and the opening was scheduled on 10 May that year. Bush, who just had a big hit in the Netherlands with "Wuthering Heights", made her debut on Dutch television in the special. Her popularity was used to draw the attention to the Haunted Castle.

In 2010, Efteling announced plans to remain open year-round. From November through about February, the 'Winter Efteling' theme remains in place.

Gisela Williams, a reporter for The Wall Street Journal, wrote a review of the park in early 2014. Williams praised Efteling but criticized the teacups-style ride Monsieur Cannibale due to ethnic stereotypes. Her review was later mentioned in De Telegraaf, a daily newspaper in the Netherlands, and drew several angry comments from its readership. Williams also received her first death threat for her comments about the controversial attraction. In recent years, activists have repeatedly requested the Efteling to remove or re-theme the attraction. In September 2021, the park closed the ride for an extensive renovation including a re-theme.

The park received its 123,456,789th guest on June 19, 2015. The Efteling opened the trackless darkride Symbolica in 2017. With a price tag of 35 million euros, it is the most expensive investment in Efteling history. Beside the theme park, the Efteling operates three hotels, a theatre, and two holiday villages. The Efteling inaugurated its 30th fairytale in 2019.

In December 2020, the park was forced to close in compliance with the new COVID-19 restrictions introduced by prime minister Mark Rutte and the third Rutte cabinet.

== Design ==
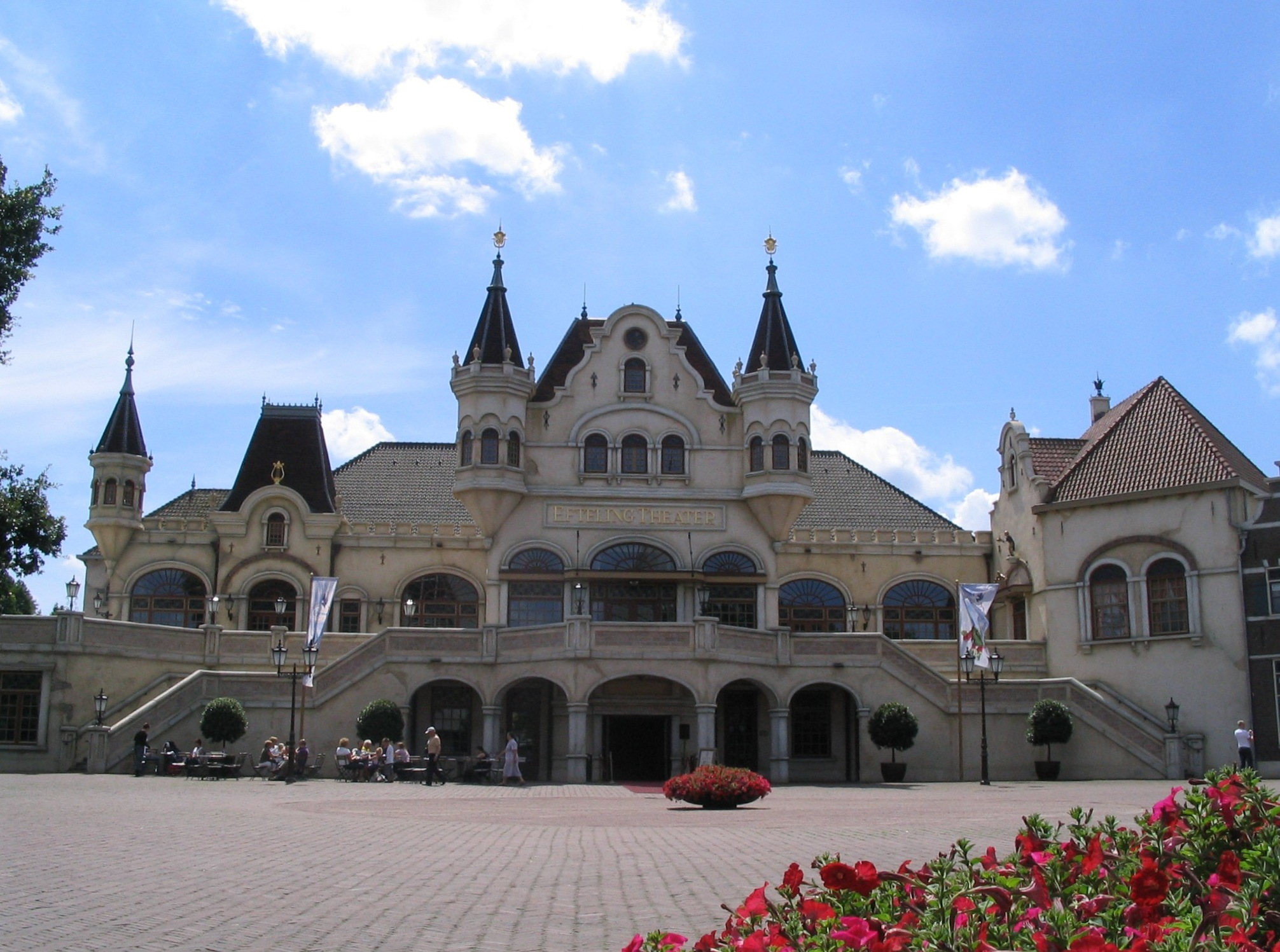
Efteling Theater – typical Van de Ven design

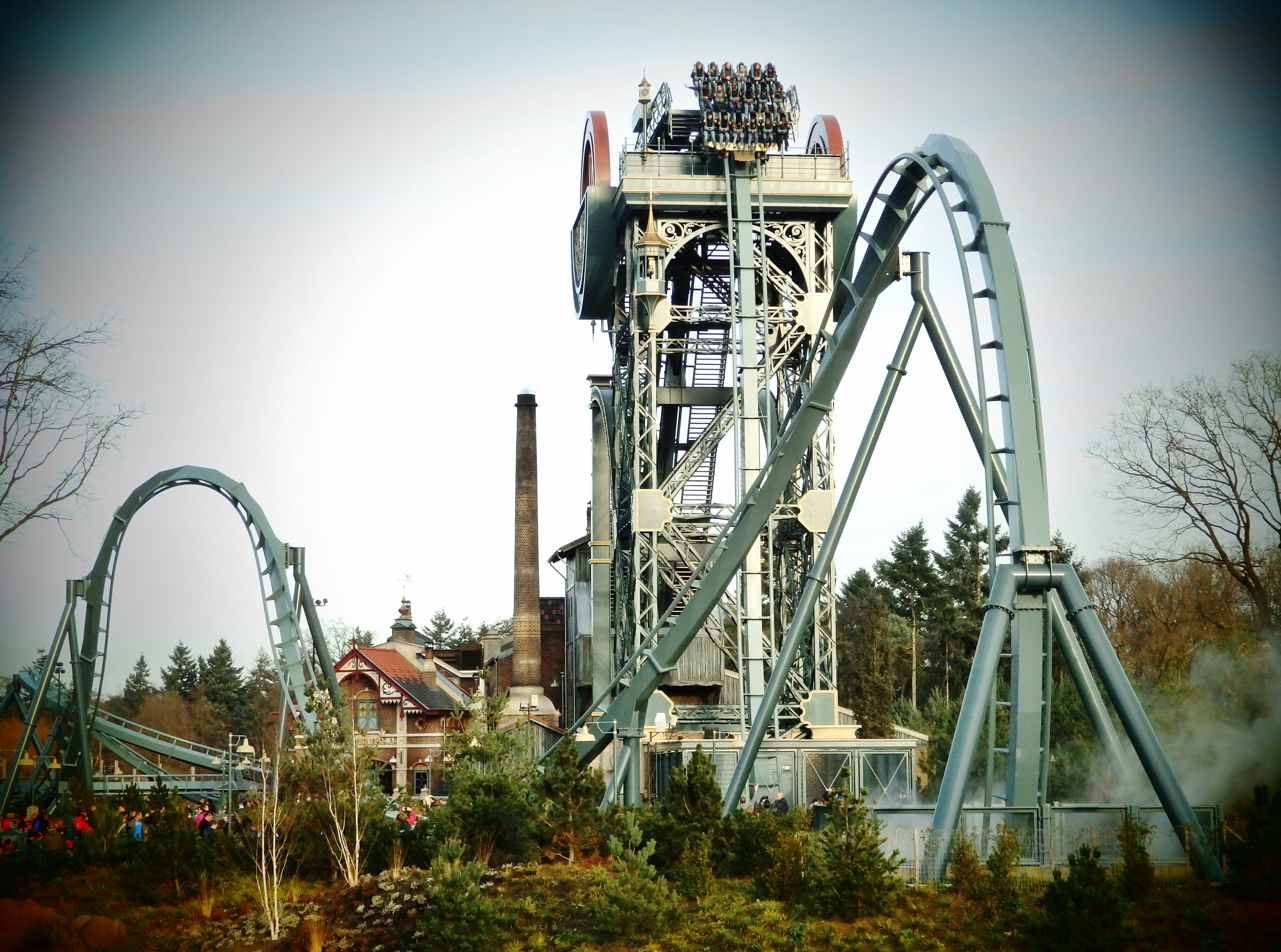
Baron 1898 – a dive coaster in Efteling

The success of Efteling has been attributed largely to its ride designs, architecture and atmosphere. When Anton Pieck was asked to design the initial fairy tales for the Efteling, he made sure the park would live up to his personal high standards. There would be no use of cheap building materials, plastic, or concrete. Pieck's illustration style, somewhat grim and dark, but also romantic and nostalgic, was the thematic base on which nearly all future expansions were built.

Pieck worked for Efteling until the mid-1970s, when his position as chief designer was passed on to the younger Ton van de Ven. Van de Ven had already been working for Efteling for several years and Pieck was very pleased with his work. The Haunted Castle (het Spookslot), which opened in 1978 as the park's first new large attraction, was Efteling's first to be designed entirely by Van de Ven.

Van de Ven continued his work until 2002, when he retired. A new team of designers works on new Efteling attractions, still in a style suitable to the Efteling.

== Divisions ==
The Efteling Theme Park Resort now comprises several divisions: the theme park (1952), the four-star Efteling Wonder Hotel (1992), Efteling Theatre (2002), and the accommodation parks: Efteling Bosrijk (2009) & Het Loonsche Land (2017). The theatre, which was once used for park shows, is one of the five biggest theatres in the Netherlands and can house big theatre productions, which will not be included in park admissions.

Besides using it as a home base for shows/musicals created by the Efteling itself (like "Droomvlucht") it also lends itself out for other big productions, events, and business events. The hotel was operated by Golden Tulip for several years, but Efteling decided in 2004 to manage it independently. The divisions are each contained in commercial corporations, but all shares are still held by the nonprofit Efteling Nature Park Foundation (Stichting Natuurpark de Efteling).

== The park ==
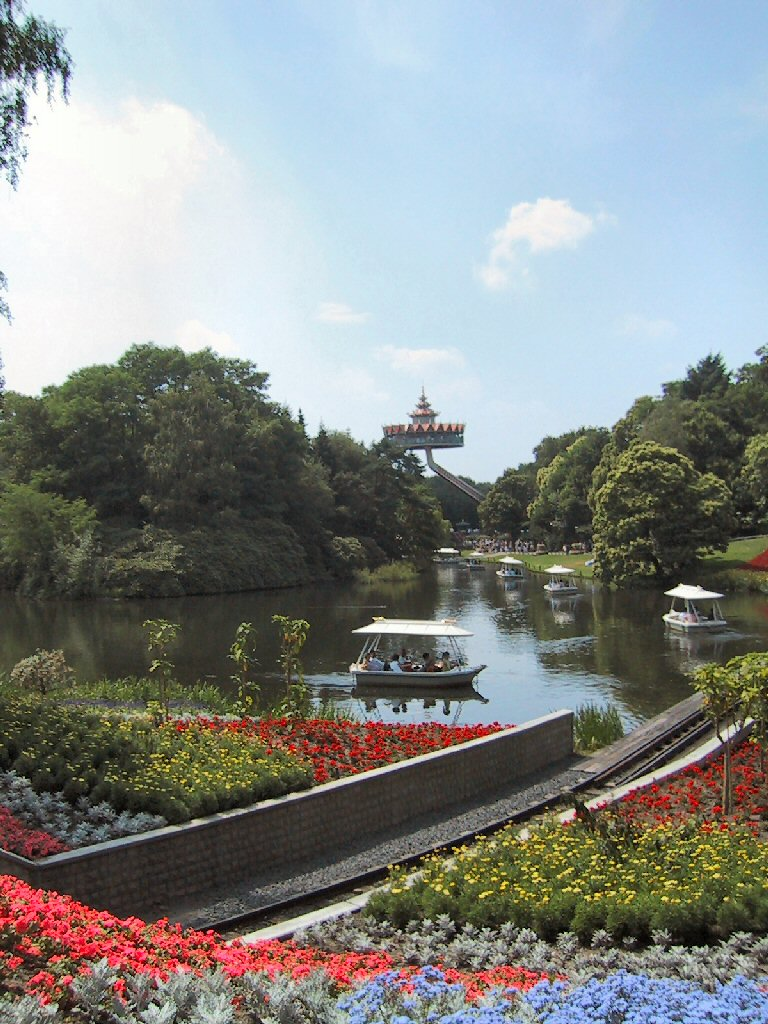
Gondoletta and Pagode

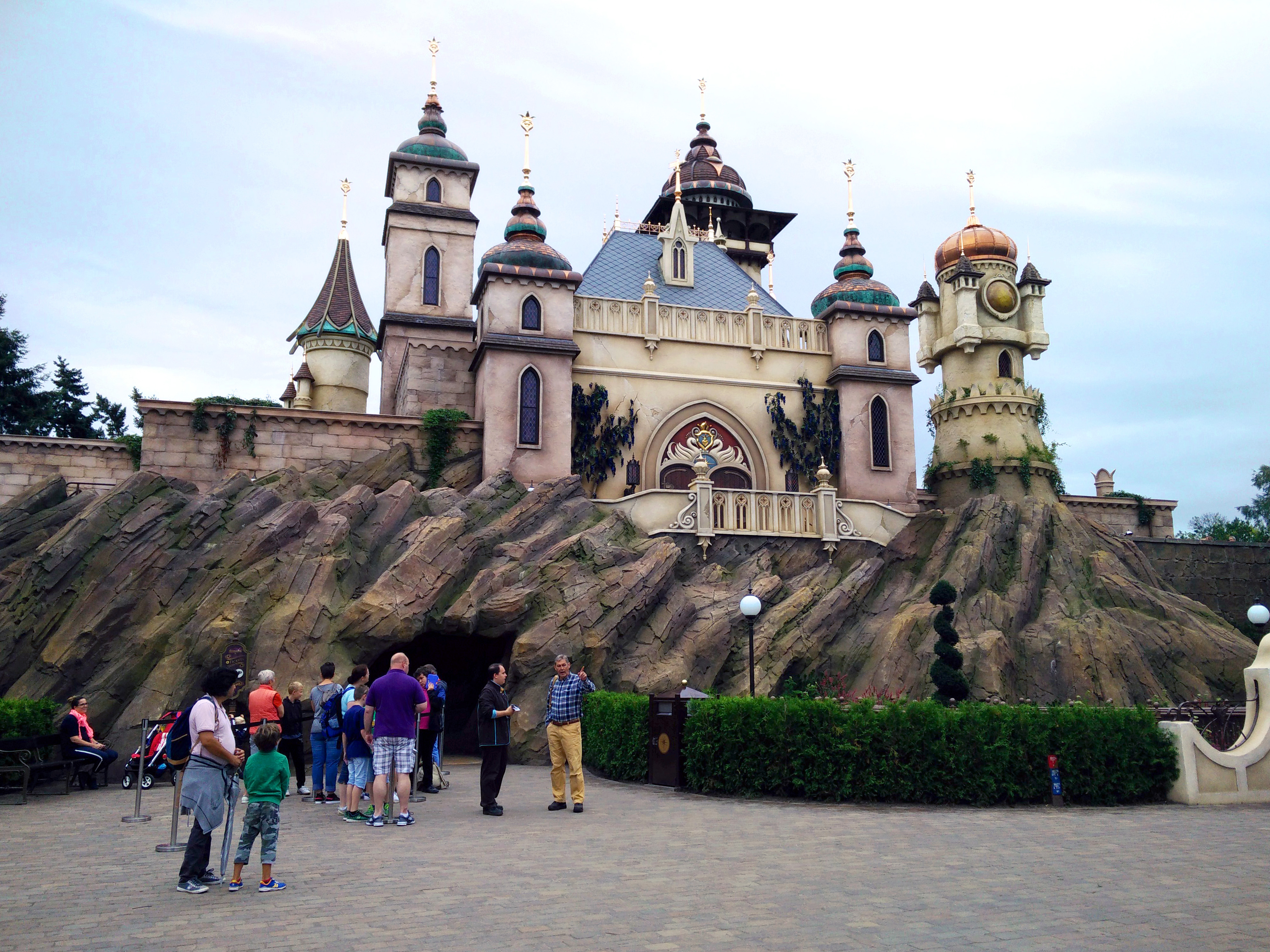
Symbolica Palace of Fantasy

The theme park covers 72 hectares (180 acres). This area has changed only marginally over the course of its history. The Efteling Theme Park Resort also offers the Efteling hotel, the Efteling hotel Loonsche Land, a theatre, a golf course, Villa Pardoes, and two holiday villages (Efteling Bosrijk and Efteling Loonsche Land) on 276.1 hectares (682 acres). The park's foundation owns a total of 400 hectares (990 acres) also including young forest, nature reserve, some grassland, fields and roads.

The park is divided into five themed areas or 'realms'. Originally, the park was divided into four areas called North, West, East, and South, with most of the park's historical rides and attractions, such as the Fairy Tale Forest, located in West. When the park reorganized its infrastructure in the late 1990s, adding the Pardoes Promenade (named after Efteling's mascot Pardoes, a court jester) and a central hub called Efteling Brink, it also changed the areas' names. North was changed to Reizenrijk (Travel Realm), West became Marerijk (Fairy Realm), East became Ruigrijk (Adventure Realm), and South became Anderrijk (Other Realm). In 2017 a fifth realm opened in the center of the park called Fantasierijk (Fantasy Realm).

Although the park was not built with these divisions in mind and the names may seem cryptic, they do make sense. Perhaps the area most suited to its name is Ruigrijk, where most fast rides such as the double-loop roller coaster Python (constructed in 1981) are located. Marerijk is the home to the Fairy Tale Forest and the Fairies of the Droomvlucht, Anderrijk has some rides that are inspired by non-Western cultures (e.g. Fata Morgana and Piraña), while Reizenrijk has the Carnaval Festival ride, which travels through several different 'countries'. The Fantasierijk got its name from the darkride Symbolica: Palace of Fantasy.

Efteling was largely built in an existing pine forest located in a rural area, giving it a 'nature park' feeling. Together with its large ponds and gardens, its abundant green space is rather unusual among the world's leading theme parks.

== Efteling Grand Hotel ==
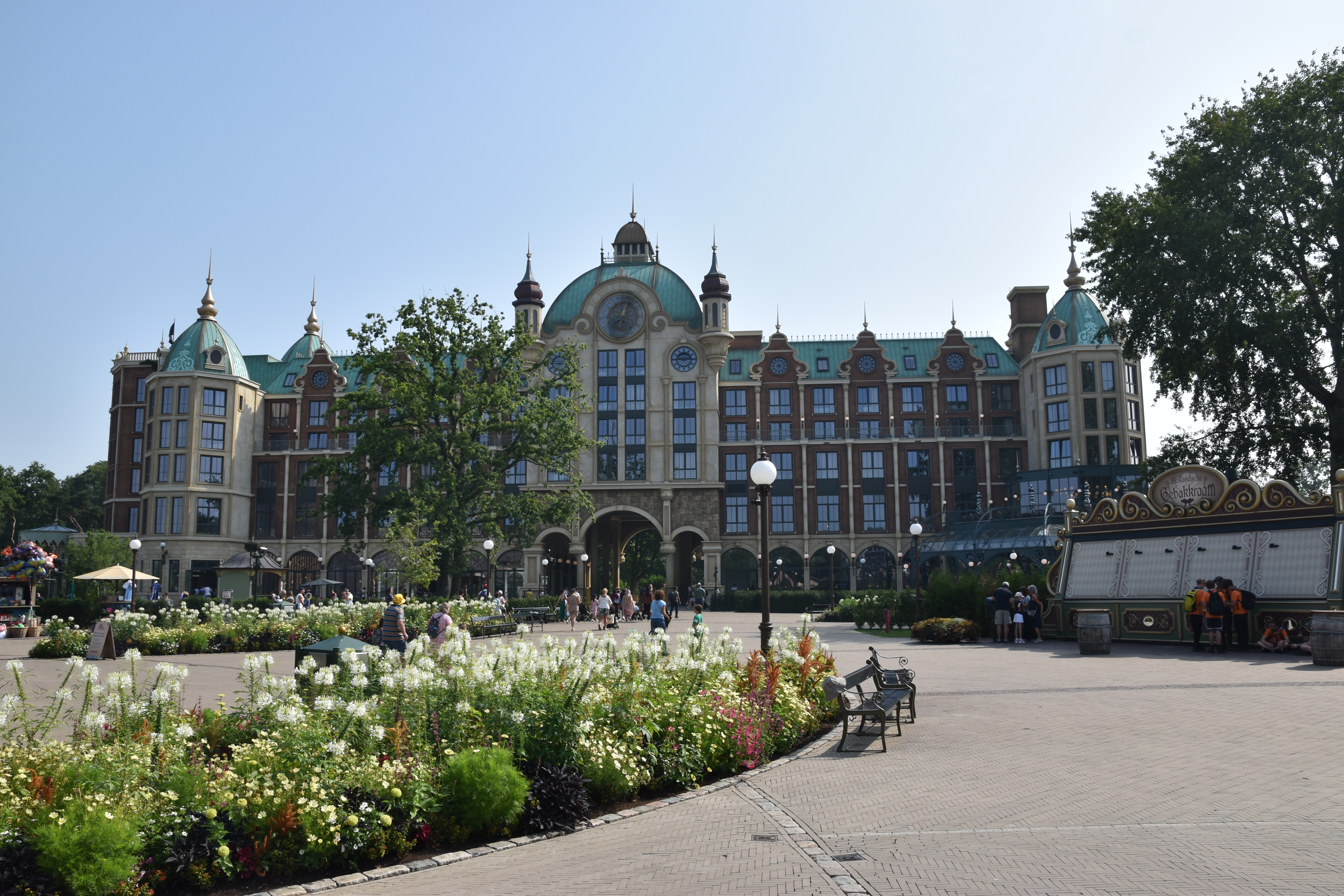
The Efteling Grand Hotel in 2025

The Efteling Grand Hotel is a hotel located in the Efteling theme park in the Netherlands. Opened in the summer of 2025, it is the largest hotel within the park and provides direct access to its attractions.

The hotel features 140 rooms and suites, each designed with a unique color theme and incorporating subtle references to Efteling’s fairytale aesthetic. It consists of seven floors and includes various amenities such as restaurants, a boutique, and wellness facilities.

Each room is designed in a single-color theme with decorative elements inspired by Efteling. A total of 644 beds are available, with an emphasis on comfort through high-quality pillows and duvets. The hotel includes a spacious lobby, shopping facilities, and dining options.

The hotel offers multiple dining options, including Brasserie 7, a casual dining venue featuring a variety of dishes, with a conservatory overlooking the Aquanura water show. For a more refined experience, Restaurant & Bar Mystique provides an extended dining experience with a selection of cocktails and bar snacks.

In addition to dining, guests have access to wellness and recreational facilities. The Pool & Spa area feature a swimming pool designed around a spring theme, as well as a wellness area with a sauna, steam bath, and massage services.

== Attractions and rides ==
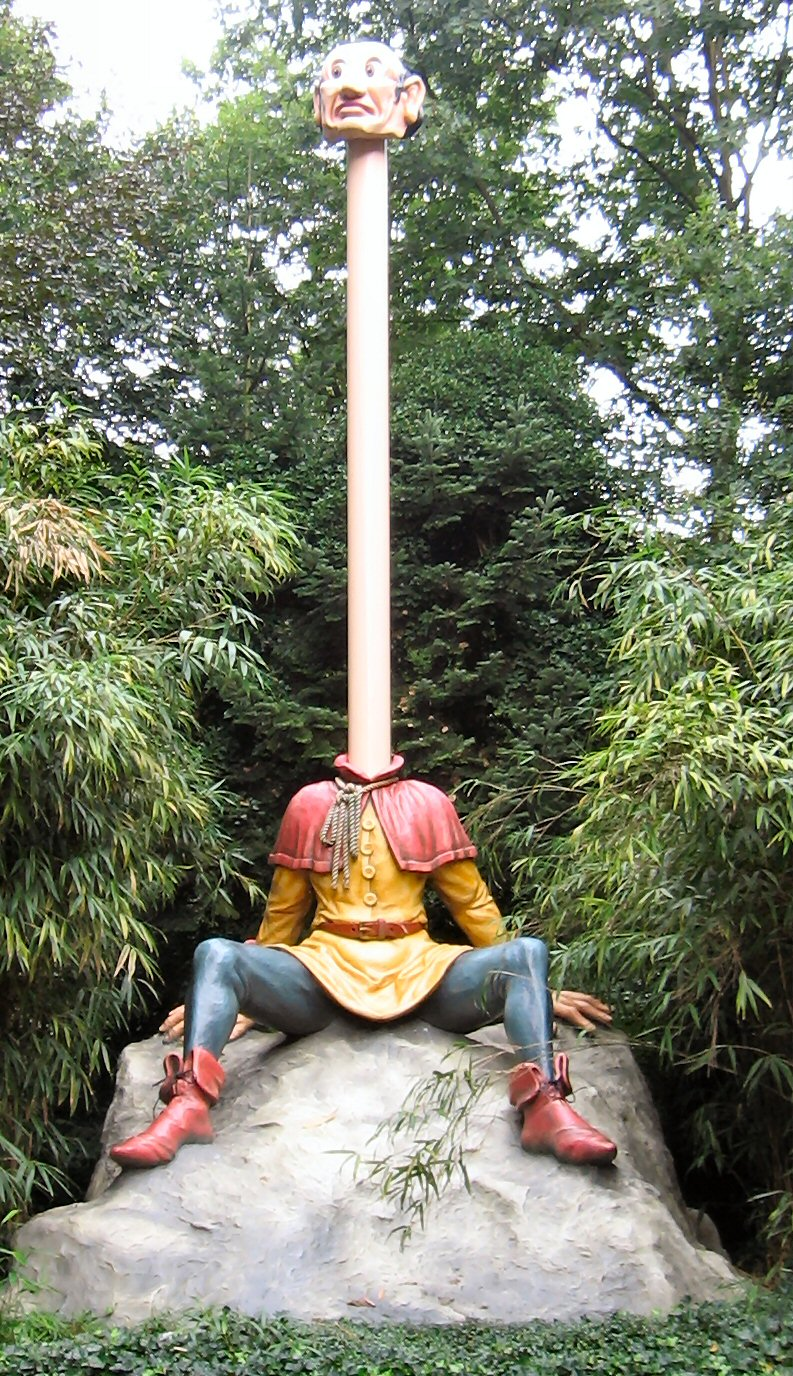
Langnek, a well-known icon of Efteling theme park

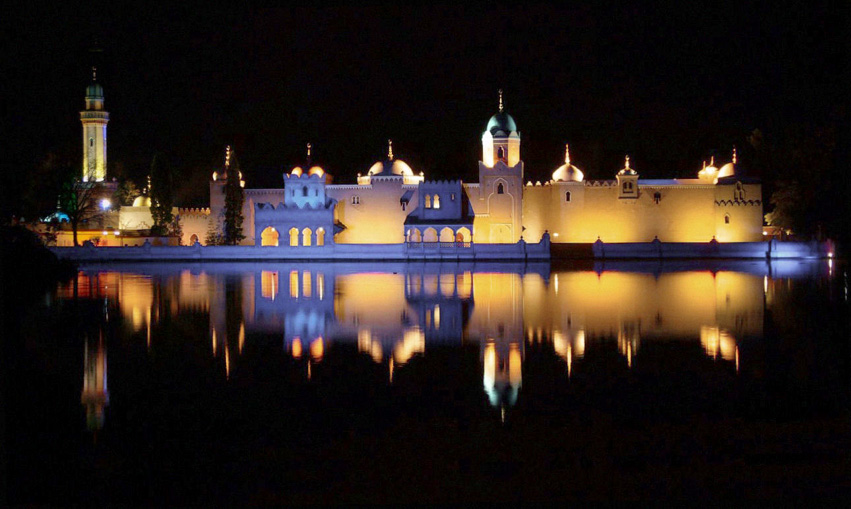
Darkride Fata Morgana by night

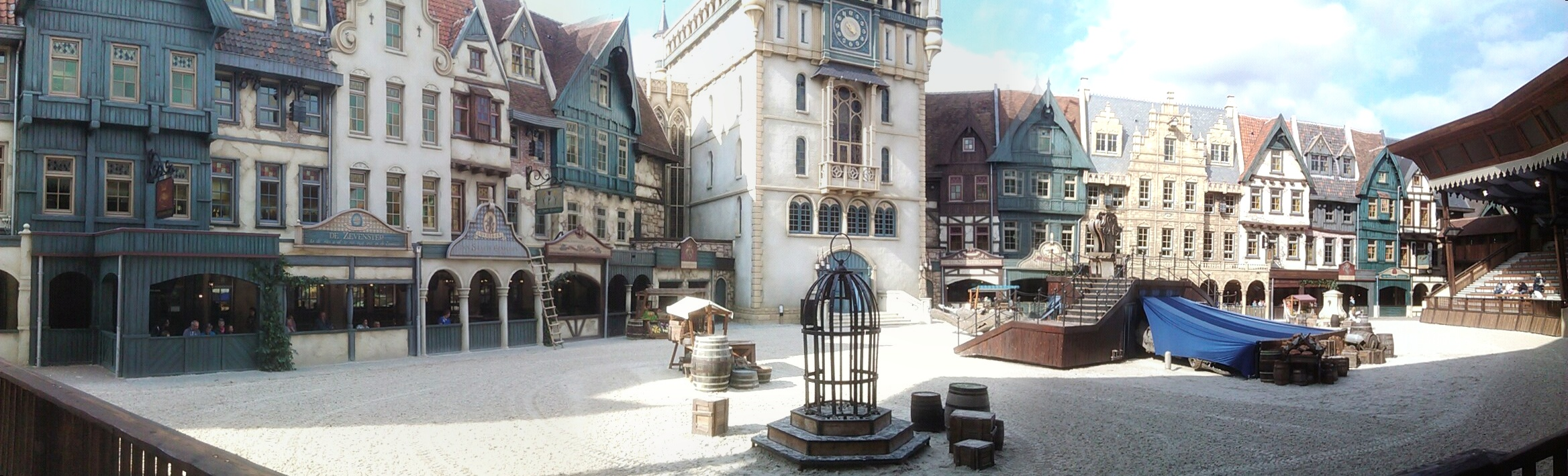
The Raveleijn

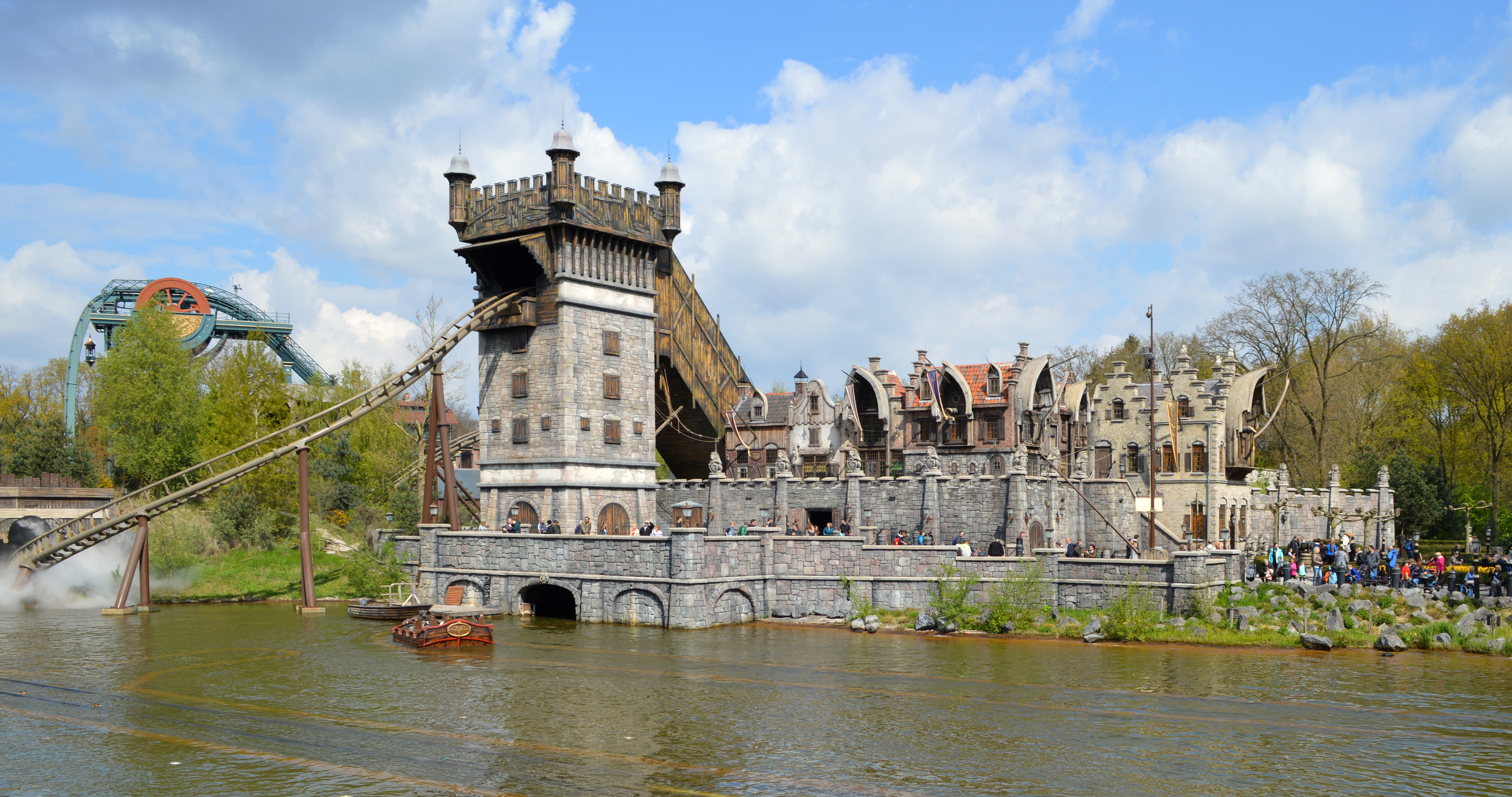
De Vliegende Hollander

- 1952 – Fairytale Forest (Dutch: Sprookjesbos; Anton Pieck, Peter Reijnders, Ton van de Ven, Henny Knoet, Michel den Dulk, Karel Willemen and Pim-Martijn Sanders)
- 1954 – Children's Railway (Dutch: Kinderspoor), (pedal trains, Anton Pieck and Peter Reijnders)
- 1954 – Anton Pieck Square (Dutch: Anton Pieckplein), (square with nostalgic rides, Anton Pieck and Michel den Dulk)
- 1956 – Stoomcarrousel (carousel, bought from Laurens Janvier)
- 1969 – Stoomtrein (a 600 mm (1 ft 11 5/8 in) narrow-gauge heritage railway)
- 1971 – Diorama (Model railway/ Diorama, Anton Pieck)
- 1981 – Python (double loop corkscrew roller coaster, Vekoma) (original demolished in 2018, replaced by a replica 3 months later)
- 1981 – Gondoletta (tow boat ride, Ton van de Ven)
- 1982 – Half Moon (Dutch: Halve Maen) (ship swing, Ton van de Ven)
- 1983 – Piraña (river rafting ride, Ton van de Ven)
- 1984 – Carnaval Festival (dark ride, Geesink)
- 1984 – Tin Lizzies (Dutch: De Oude Tuffer) (car ride, Ton van de Ven)
- 1986 – Fata Morgana (dark, tow boat ride, Ton van de Ven)
- 1987 – Pagode (observation tower, Ton van de Ven)
- 1990 – The People of Laaf (Dutch: Volk van Laaf) (Ton van de Ven)
- 1993 – Dreamflight (Dutch: Droomvlucht) (dark ride, Ton van de Ven)
- 1996 – The House of the Five Senses (Dutch: Het huis van de 5 zintuigen) (park entrance, Ton van de Ven)
- 1996 – Villa Volta (madhouse, Vekoma)
- 1998 – Bird Roc (Dutch: Vogel Rok) (enclosed roller coaster, Ton van de Ven)
- 2007 – The Flying Dutchman (Dutch: De Vliegende Hollander) (water coaster / dark ride, Karel Willemen)
- 2010 – George and the Dragon (Dutch: Joris en de Draak) (wooden racing coaster, Karel Willemen)
- 2011 – Ravelin (Dutch: Raveleijn) (theatre, Sander de Bruijn)
- 2012 – Aquanura (Musical Fountain, WET)
- 2015 – Baron 1898 (dive coaster Bolliger & Mabillard, Sander de Bruijn)
- 2017 – Symbolica (dark ride, ETF Ride Systems/Sander de Bruijn and others)
- 2019 – Fabula replaces the former PandaVision (€3.5 million renovation by Efteling and Aardman Animations)
- 2020 – Max & Moritz (double roller coaster, Mack Rides), Robbert Jaap Janssen
- 2022 – Sirocco replaces the former Monsieur Canibale, Jeroen Verheij
- 2024 – Danse Macabre, (dynamic motion stage, Intamin) Jeroen Verheij
- 2026 – Hooghmoed (family freefall towers, Zierer)

=== Future attractions ===
- 2026 Ravenring, A new prototype spinning and swinging flat ride manufactured by Vekoma.
- 2029 Missie Luminar, A launched thrill glider coaster manufactured by Vekoma

=== Former attractions ===
- 1953 – 2011 Rowing Pond (Dutch: Roeivijver), replaced by Aquanura
- 1953 – 1988 Swimming Pool (Dutch: Zwembad)
- 1966 – 2010 Water Organ (Dutch: Waterorgel), in use as a TV studio since 2010
- 1978 – 2022 Haunted Castle (Dutch: Spookslot) (haunted attraction, Ton van de Ven and Anton Pieck), closed 2022, replaced by Danse Macabre in 2024.
- 1984 – 2020 Polka Marina (a combination of a carousel and a minirollercoaster, Ton van de Ven)
- 1985 – 2019 Bob Track (Dutch: Bobbaan) (bobsled roller coaster, Intamin Ton van de Ven), demolished in 2019, replaced by Max & Moritz
- 1988 – 2021 Monsieur Cannibale (teacups ride, Henny Knoet) Replaced by Sirocco
- 1991 – 2009 Pegasus (junior wooden roller coaster, demolished in 2009), replaced by George and the Dragon
- 2002 – 2019 PandaVision (Dutch: Pandadroom) (a 4-D film cinema, Van Doorn and associates), replaced by Fabula

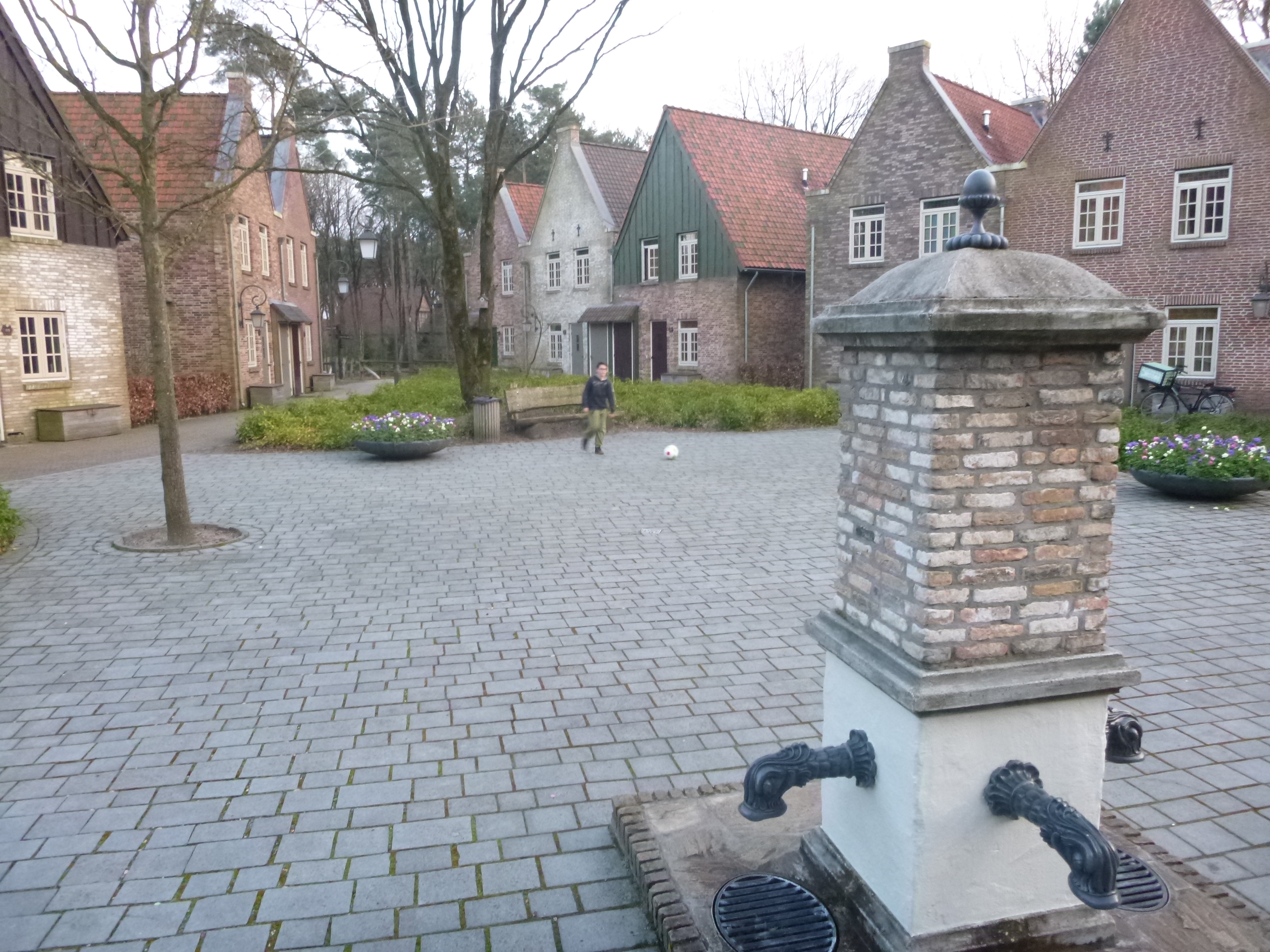
Village's square at Efteling Bosrijk

=== Other ventures operating independently from the park ===
- 1992 – Efteling Wonder Hotel - Known simply as the Efteling Hotel until 2025
- 1995 – Efteling Golf course (Dutch: Golfclub Efteling) - No longer a part of Efteling, following a transfer to the Hollandsche Golfbaan Exploitatiemaatschappij in 2021, and renamed Golf Park De Loonsche Duynen.
- 2002 – Efteling Theatre (theatre, Ton van de Ven)
- 2008 – Efteling Radio (radio station)
- 2009 – Efteling Bosrijk (accommodation area, Karel Willemen)
- 2017 – The Loonsche Land (Dutch: Het Loonsche Land) (accommodation)
- 2025 – Efteling Grand Hotel

== Awards ==
- In 1971, the Efteling was the first theme park to receive the Pomme d'Or (Golden Apple), in recognition of superior efforts in promoting and raising Europe's level of tourism. The Pomme d'Or is the highest award in the European tourist industry.
- In 1992, the Efteling was awarded the IAAPA Applause Award for best theme park in the world.
- In 1997, Villa Volta, as the first 'new style' madhouse in the world, received the Thea Attraction Award.
- In 2005, the Efteling received the Thea Classic Award for the year 2004, a notable token of recognition of quality awarded by other people in the themed entertainment industry. Efteling is the second park to receive a prize for their entire oeuvre, the first being Tivoli Gardens in Copenhagen, Denmark.
- In 2014, 2015 and 2016, the Efteling won the award for the best holiday park in the Netherlands according to the booking sites BungalowSpecials.nl, BungalowSpecials.be, FerienparkSpecials.de and HolidayParkSpecials.co.uk. These awards were based solely on ratings from guests who have stayed at the Efteling.
- In 2017, the Efteling was titled 'Best Themepark' in the world by Theme Park Insider, based on overall reader and visitor ratings.
- In 2018, Symbolica received the TEA Award For Outstanding Achievement.
- In 2018, 'Best Themepark' and 'Best new dark ride' in the world by Theme Park Insider.
- In 2019, 'Best Themepark' in The Netherlands & Belgium. Diamond Theme Park Awards 2019.
- In 2025, Golden Ticket Award for Best New Family Attraction, Danse Macabre (Efteling)

== Economy and governance ==
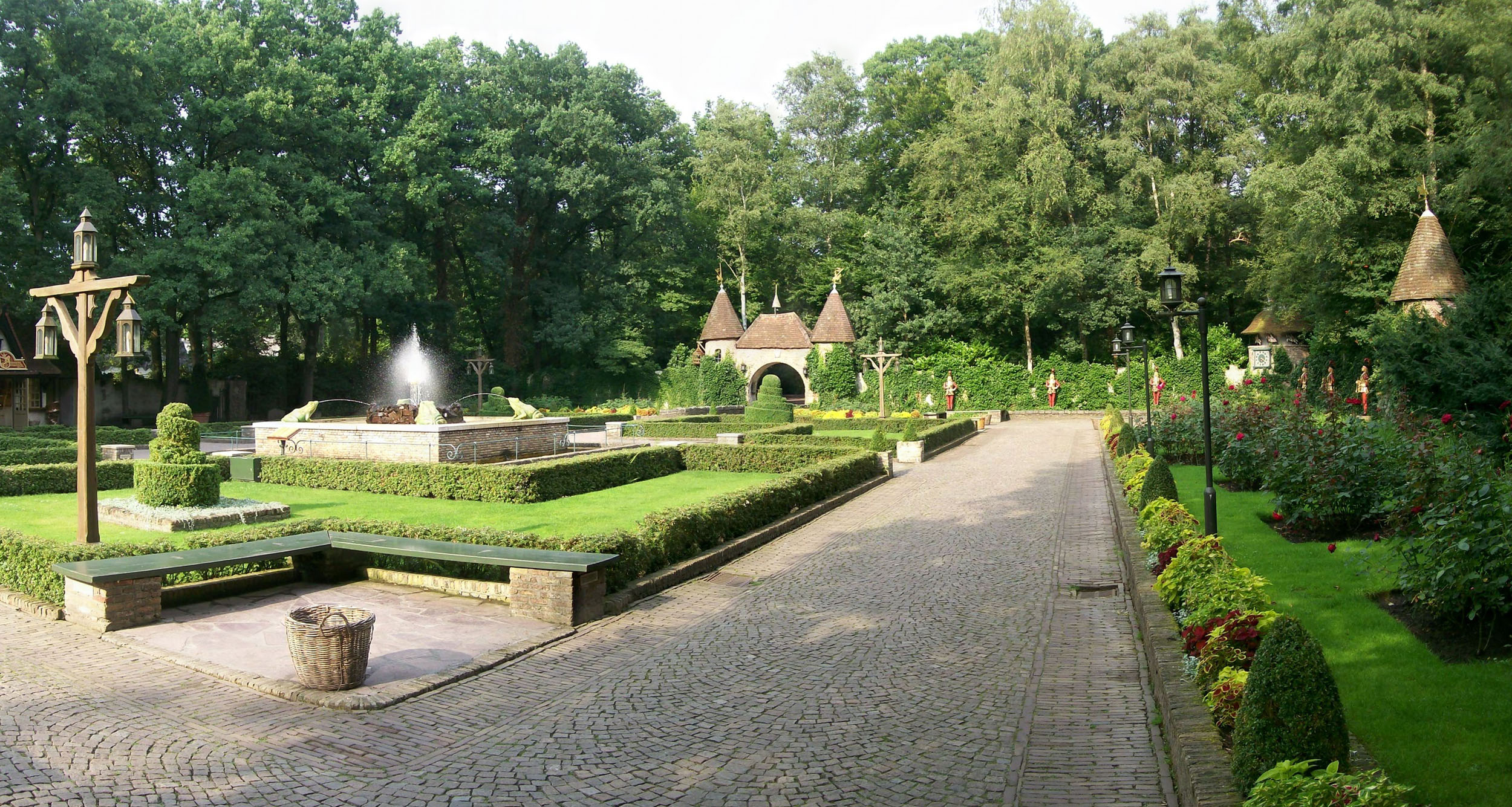
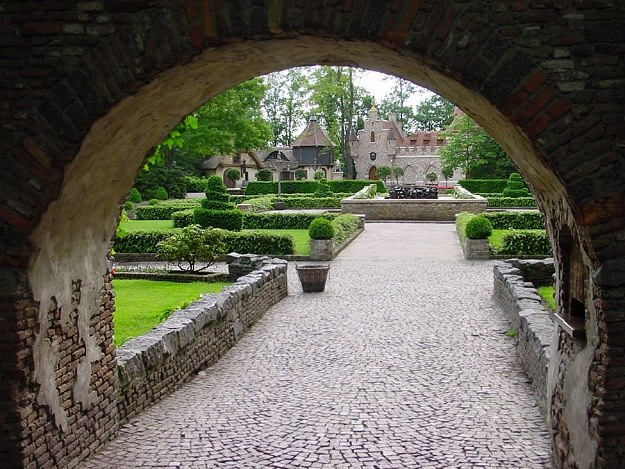
Herald Square (Herautenplein) in the Fairy Tale Forest

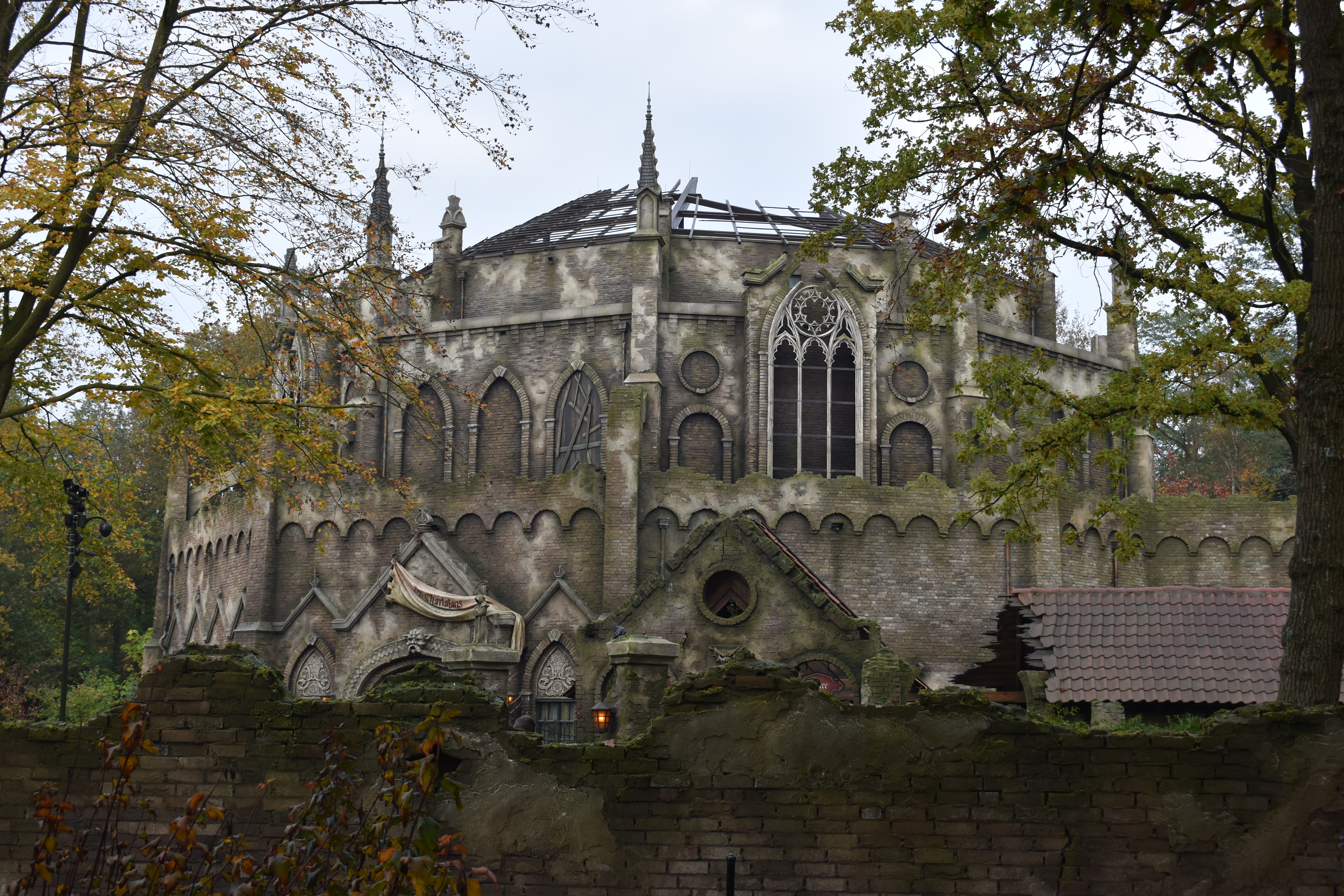
Danse Macabre, the replacement for the Haunted Castle

=== Structure ===
The Efteling is a private company limited by shares. The Efteling Nature Park Foundation (Stichting Natuurpark de Efteling) is the only shareholder. The foundation was founded in 1950 by R.J.Th. van der Heijden, Peter Reijnders, and Anton Pieck. The company is led by two directors. They manage four sections: the theme park, the Efteling Hotel, the Efteling Golf course, and the Efteling Theatre.

Since April 17, 2014, the company's CEO has been Fons Jurgens.

=== Employees ===
In the high season, Efteling employs 2,500 workers. In 2000, the number was 1670, of which 400 had a permanent contract (24%), 450 were seasonal employees (27%) and 820 had temp jobs (49%).

=== Visitors ===
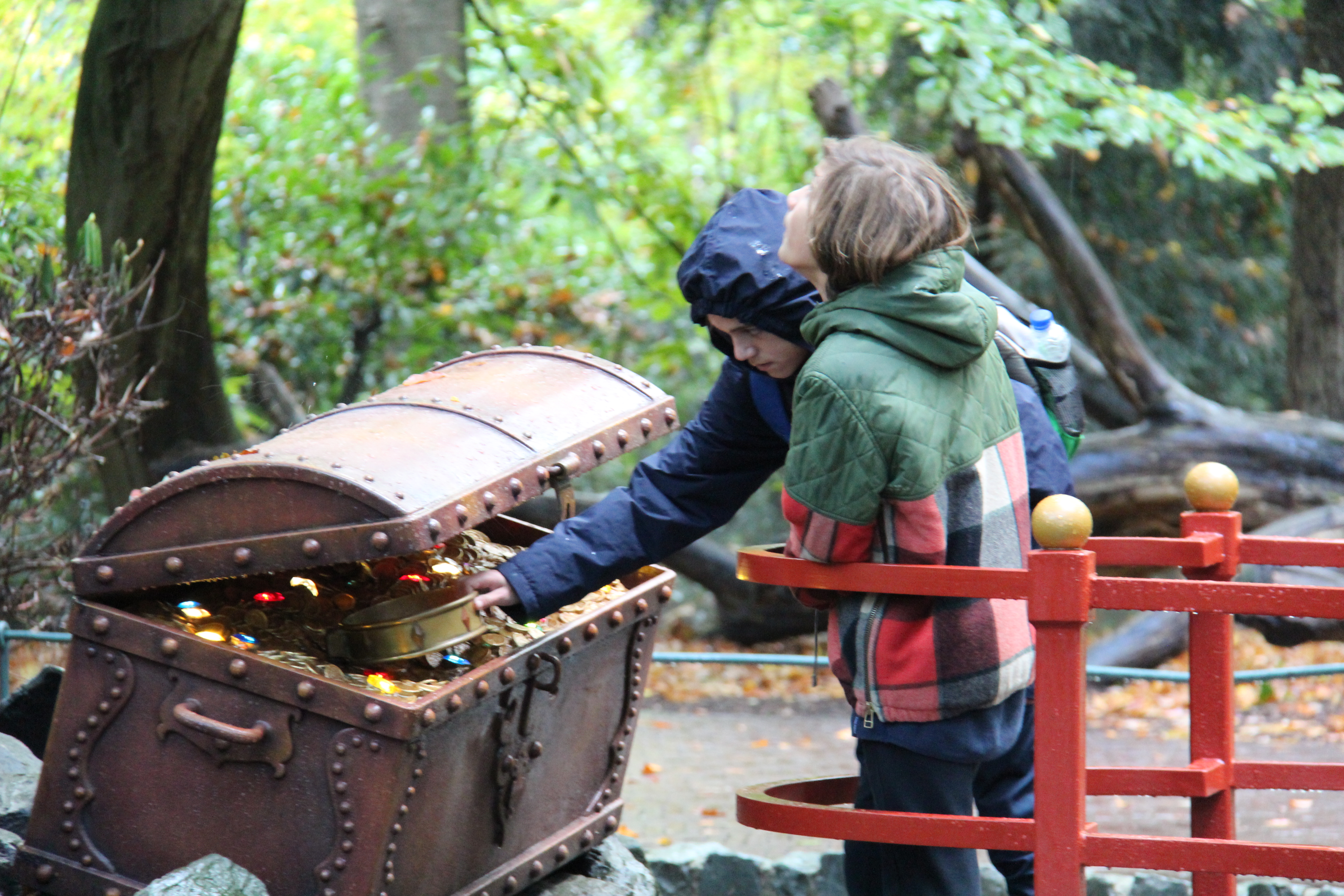
Treasury

red Disneyland Paris,
#2 amusement park in Europe of annual attendance, in 2020
blue Efteling,
#1 amusement park in Europe of annual attendance, in 2020

Eftelfing opened in 1952, attracting 222,941 visitors in the year. In 1954, the millionth visitor since the official opening was welcomed.

In 1983, attendance increased by 30%, making Efteling the leading leisure park in Europe with 1.9 million visitors per year. This continued in 1989, when Efteling saw 2.1 million visitors, including 1.6 million from the Netherlands. By 1991, Efteling's 2.6 million visitors significantly outstripped its closest European competition; Europa-Park, Alton Towers and Phantasialand all saw approximately 2 million visitors in the same year.

In 2007, Efteling attracted 3,240,000 visitors, making it the most popular theme park in the Netherlands. In 2009, annual admissions surpassed 4,000,000 for the first time. While park management aimed to surpass 5,000,000 annual admissions by 2020, this was achieved in 2017 when the park drew 5,180,000 visitors, making it the most popular attraction of any type in the Netherlands.

Most Efteling visitors are Dutch: 94% of the Dutch population has visited the park. About 16% of visitors live in areas such as Flanders (Belgium), Westphalia (Germany) and Southern England (UK).

A graph of the number of visitors of the Efteling during the period 1952–2018:

=== Ticket price ===
A graph of the ticket price in euros of the Efteling during the period 1952-2014:

From 1952 to 2002, the ticket price was set in Dutch guilders, the Netherlands' currency before introduction of the Euro. These prices were converted to euros using a conversion factor of 0.45378. In 1952, the ticket price was 0.80 Dutch guilders (0.36 euros). From 1956 to 1965, the ticket price remained at 1 Dutch guilder, later rising to 42 Dutch guilders by 2001. This became €21 following the introduction of the euro in 2002. In May 2019, tickets cost €42 or €40 during the "low season". "Deluxe" tickets, including lunch, dinner, free parking and other perks, sold for €68. Tickets ordered online are sold with a discount of €2. Admission is free for children under 4.

=== Investments ===
On 11 December, 2008, Efteling announced three large construction projects requiring €40 million for construction between 2009 and 2012. These were a convention centre accommodating 1,500 visitors (de Burcht), a Middle Ages-themed arena designed for 750 spectators (Raveleijn), and a redesigned snack bar "De Likkebaerd", turning this into a station for the park's steam train. However, the impact of the 2008 financial crisis caused the cancellation of the Burcht, announced in 2009.

In 2015, park management announced the ambition to attract 7 million guests by 2030. For this purpose, the Bestemmingsplan Wereld van de Efteling 2030 was drawn up over the following three years. This outlined the ambition to expand the park to the east, as far as the De Horst and N261 roads. After the eastern expansion, the park would expand west by redeveloping existing car parks. In 2018, this plan was unanimously adopted within the local municipality of Loon op Zand, after which three objections were submitted to the Raad van State. While the council investigated two of these objections, De Efteling was blocked from beginning the expansion, but revised plans were again approved by the council in June 2021. Due to multiple closures of the park following the outbreak of the COVID-19 pandemic, park management reviewed its investment plans, deciding to postpone the expansion to the east for a few years and to focus on expansions within the existing park boundaries. On 24 January, 2022, the company announced it would invest €75 million in the construction of a new hotel within the park on the square behind the entrance, later known as the Efteling Grand Hotel. It also invested in an attraction to replace Spookslot, with Danse Macabre opening in 2024.

== Gallery ==
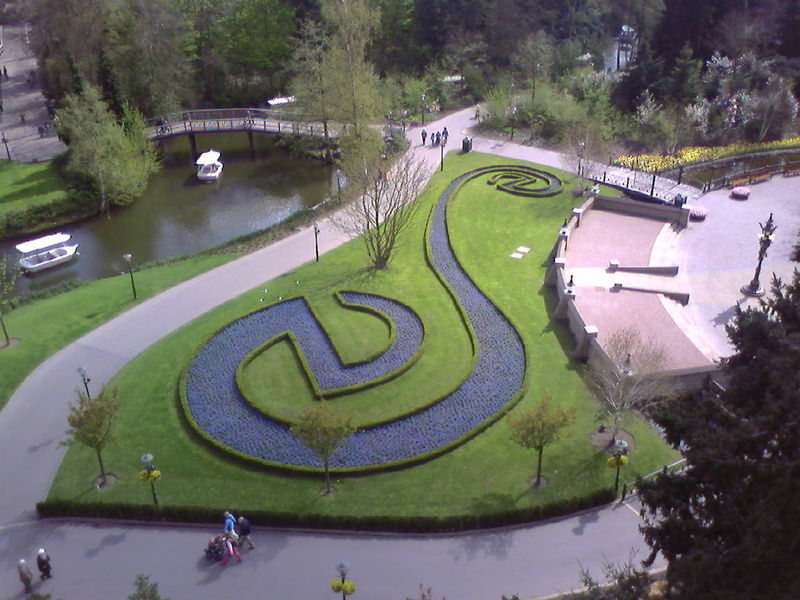
Efteling logo seen from Pagoda, before construction of Symbolica

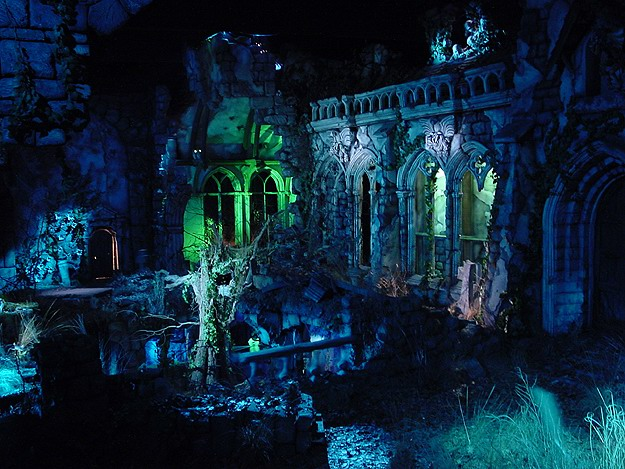
Haunted Castle (1978–2022)

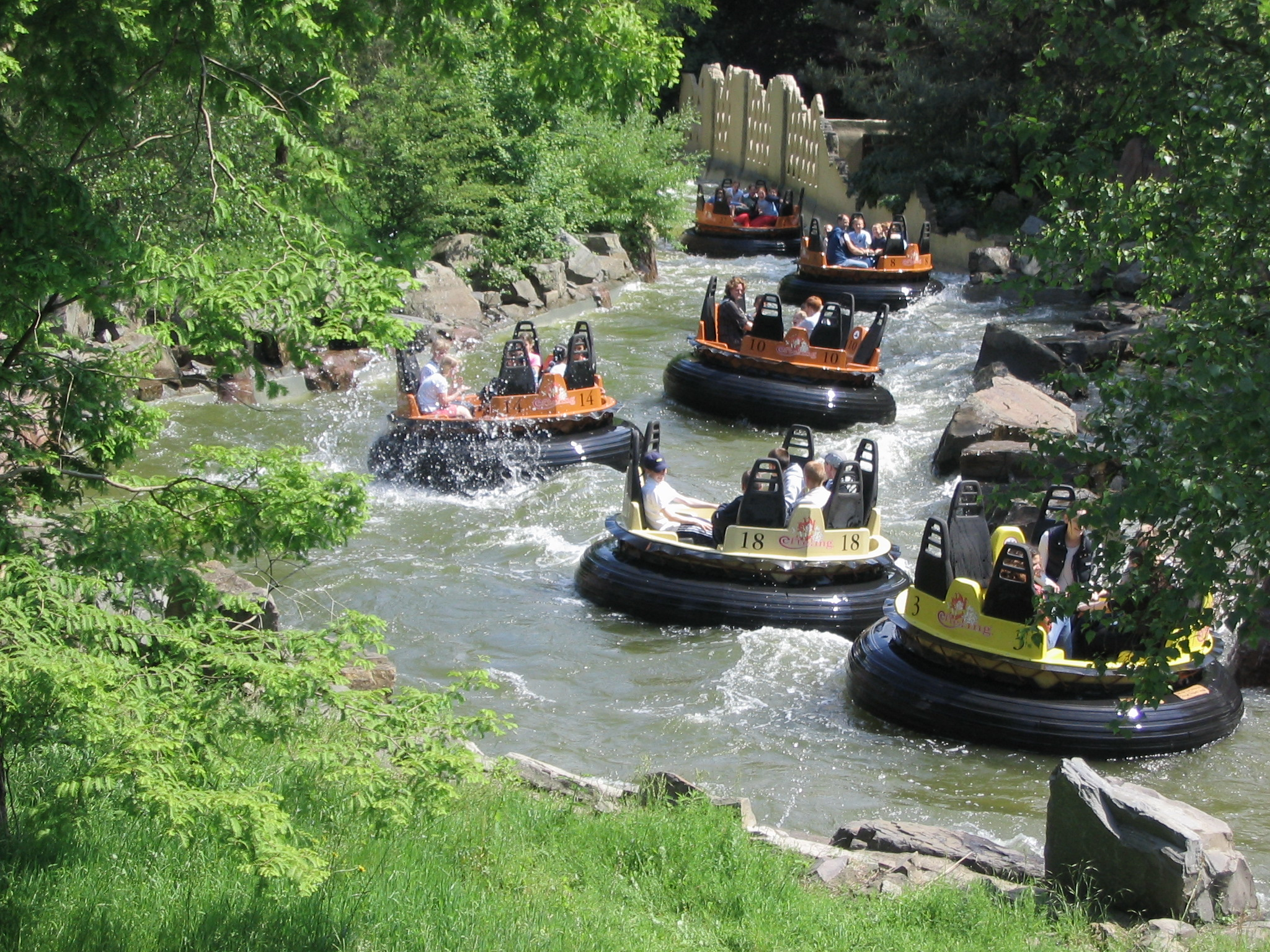
The Piraña, a river rafting ride in a pre-Columbian atmosphere

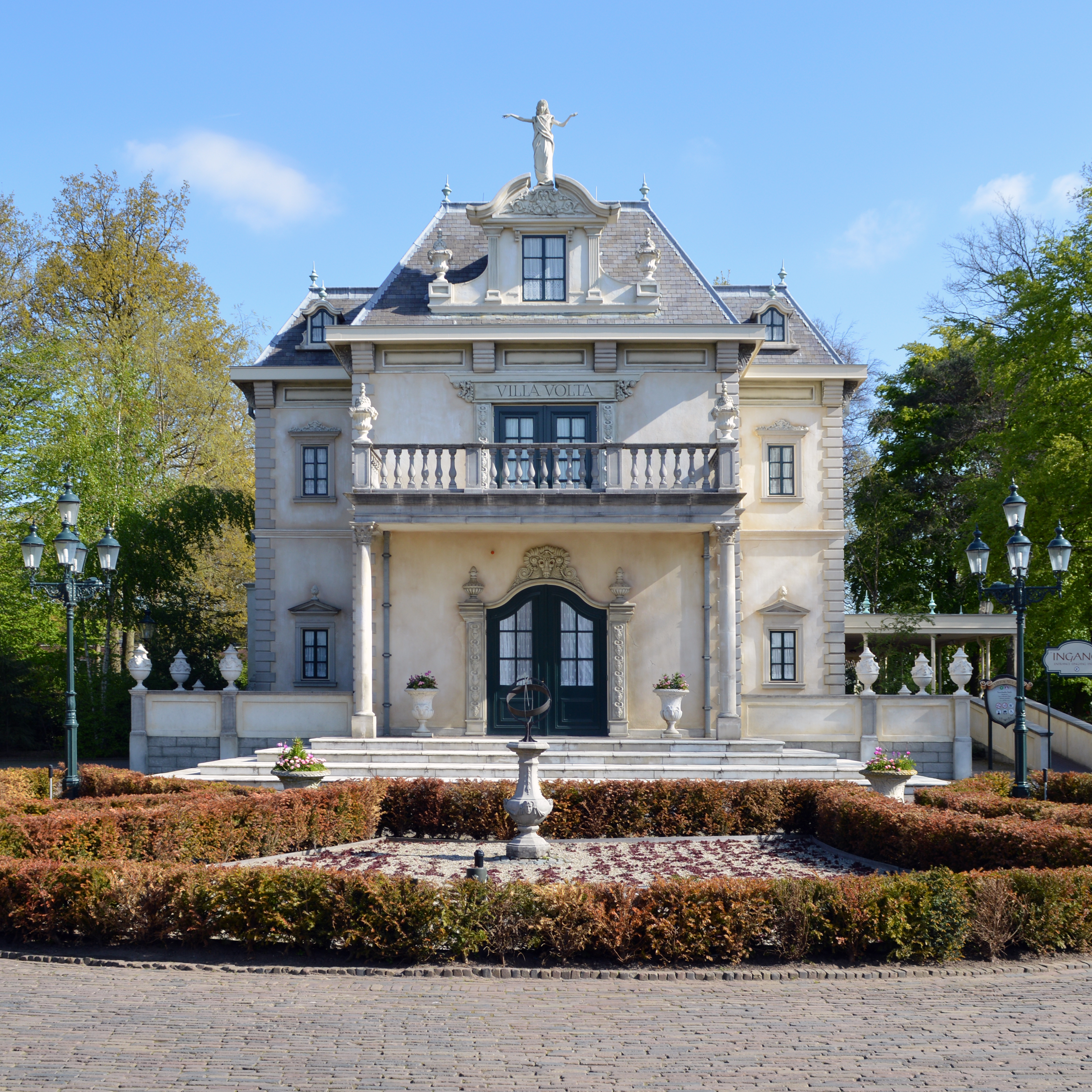
Villa Volta, the first modern Madhouse in the world

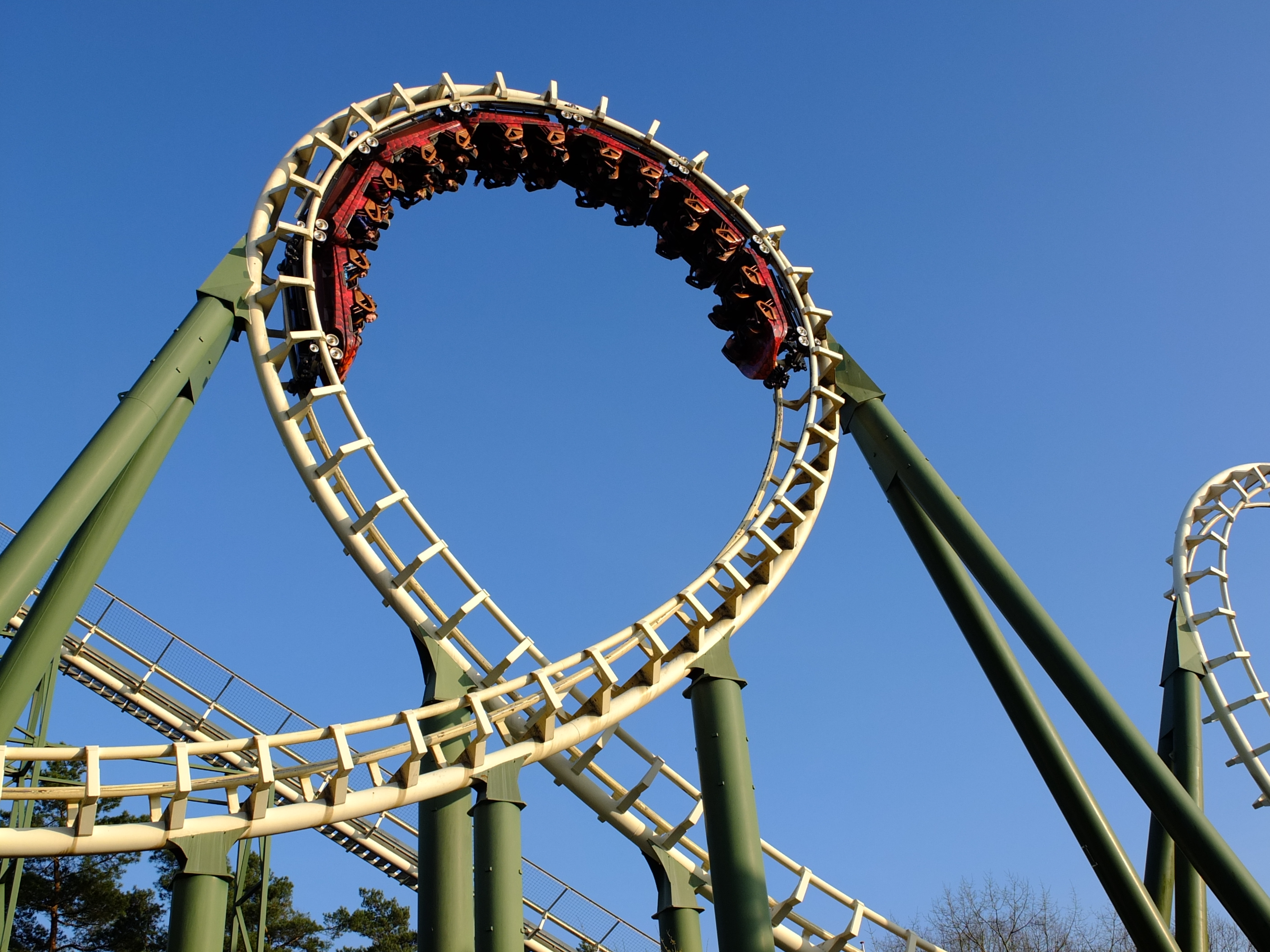
The Python

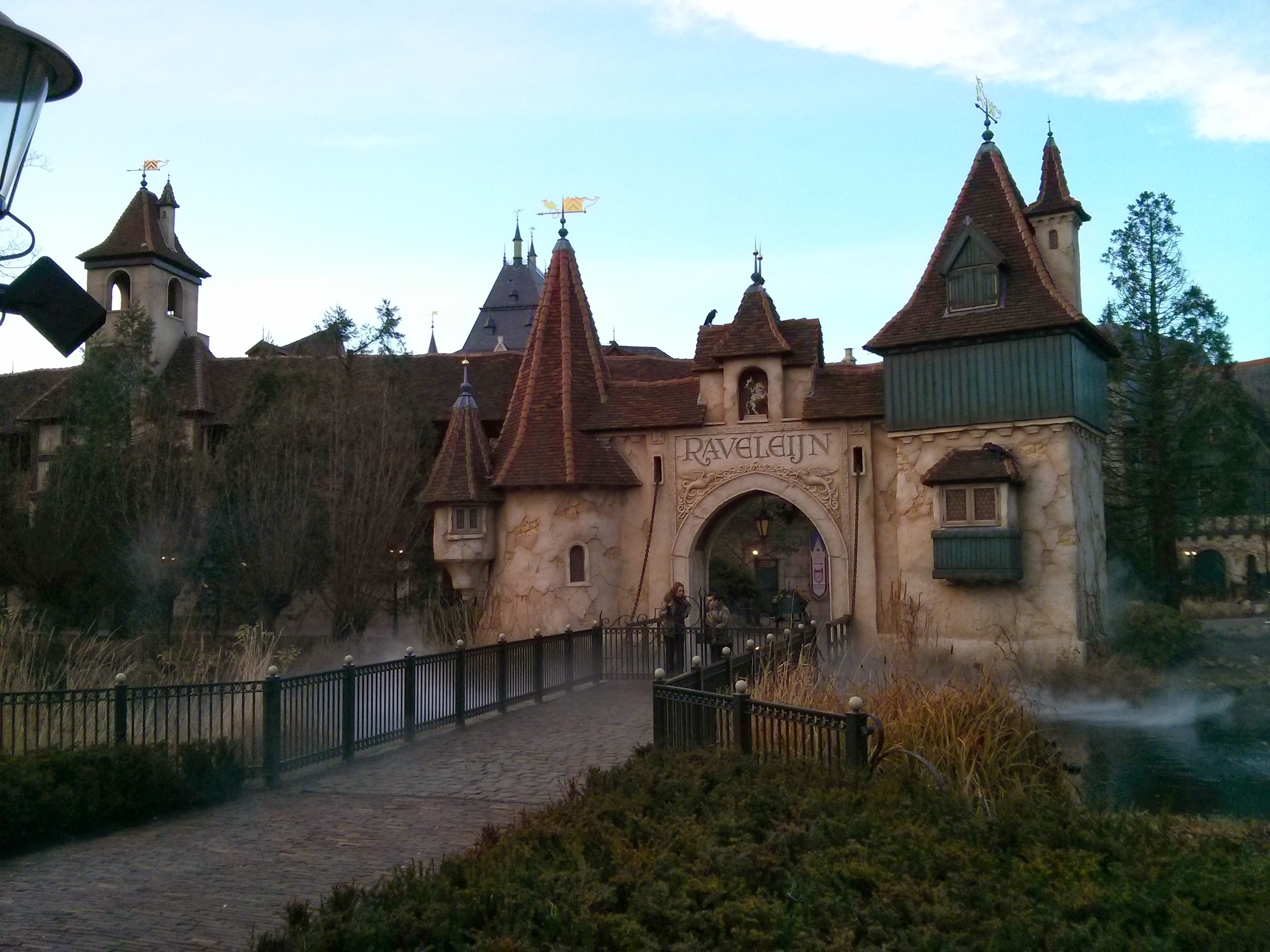
Entrance to Raveleijn, Park Show

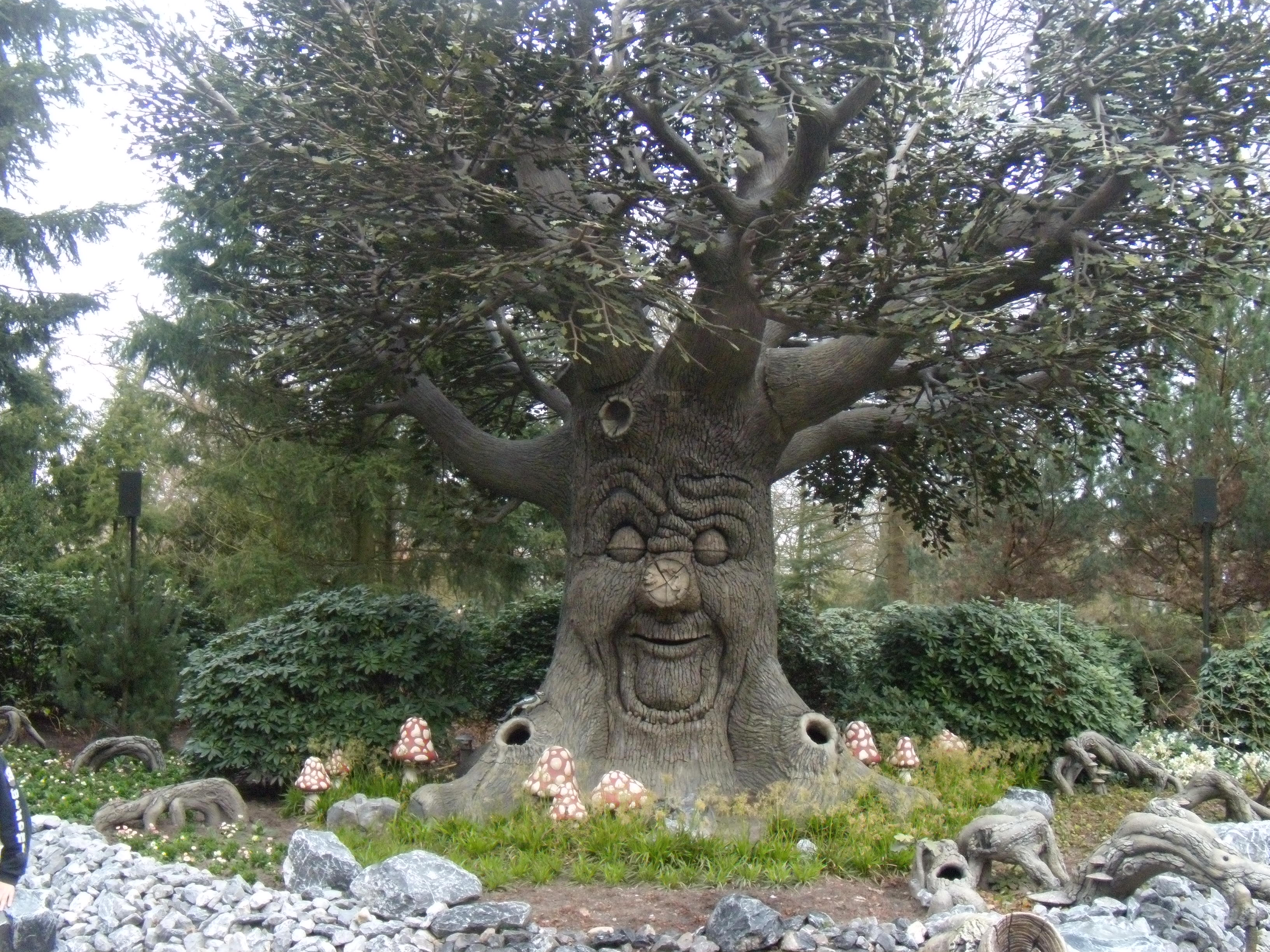
Fairytale Tree, Fairytale Forest

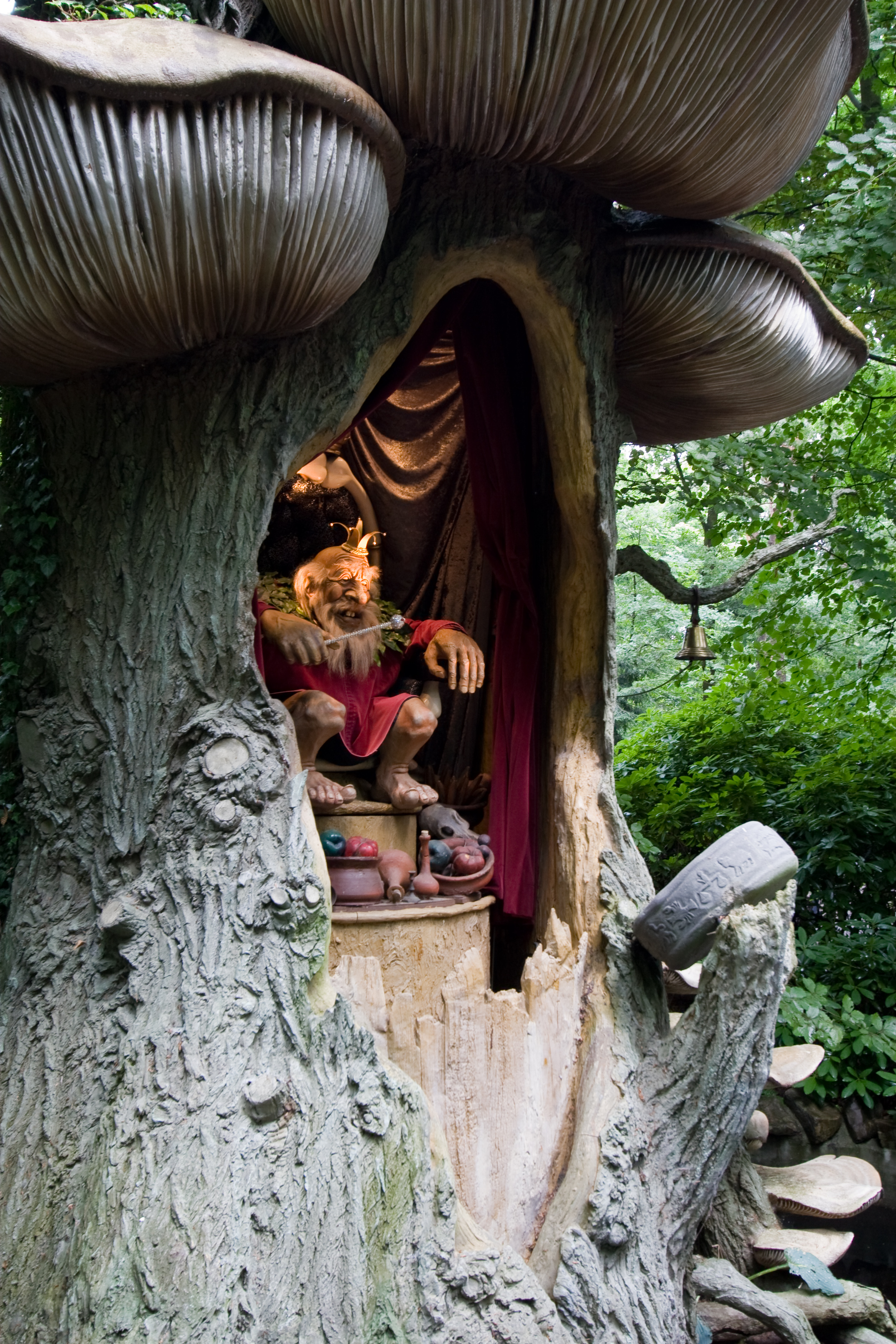
Troll King, Fairytale Forest

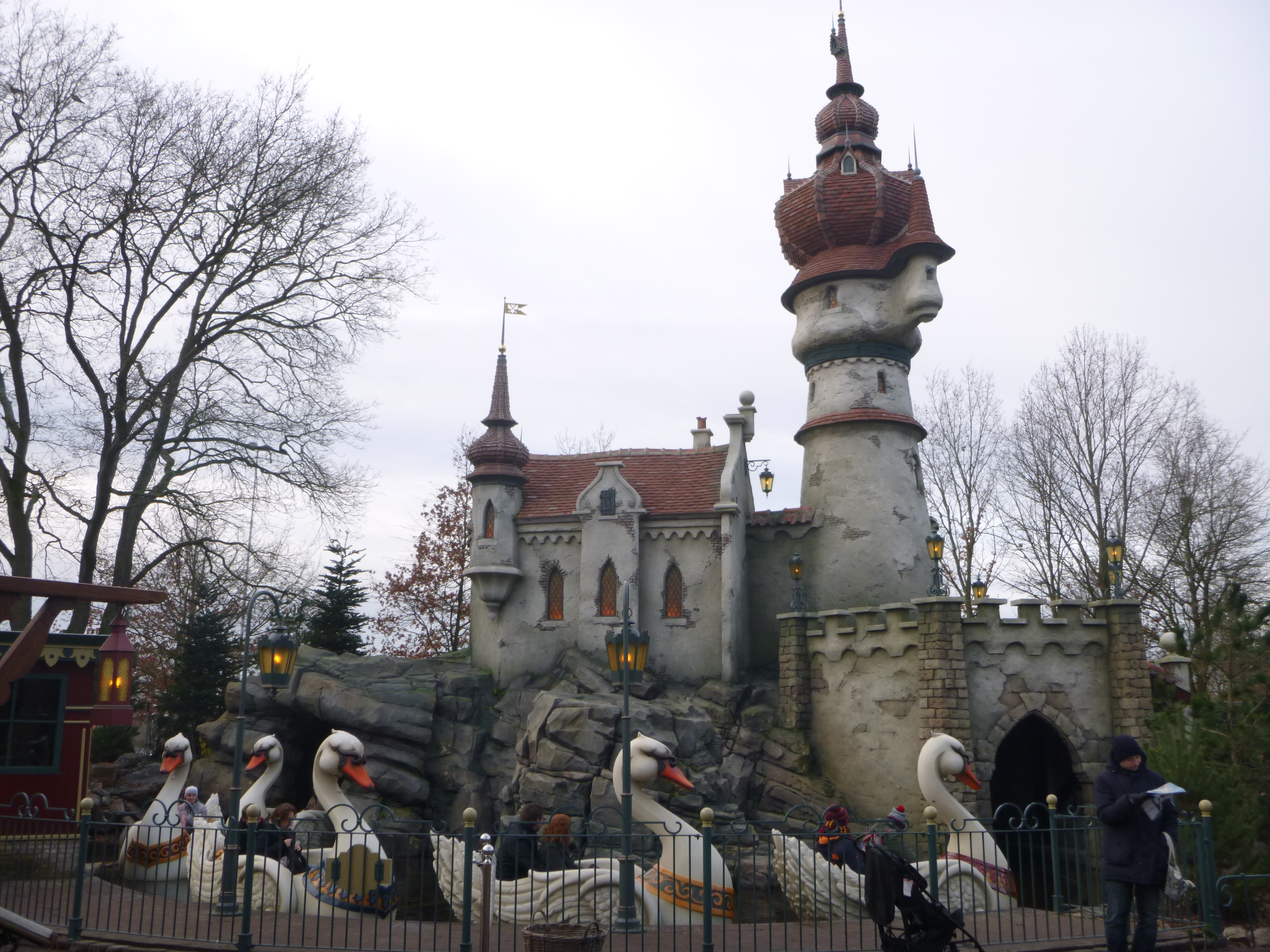
The Six Swans, Fairytale Forest

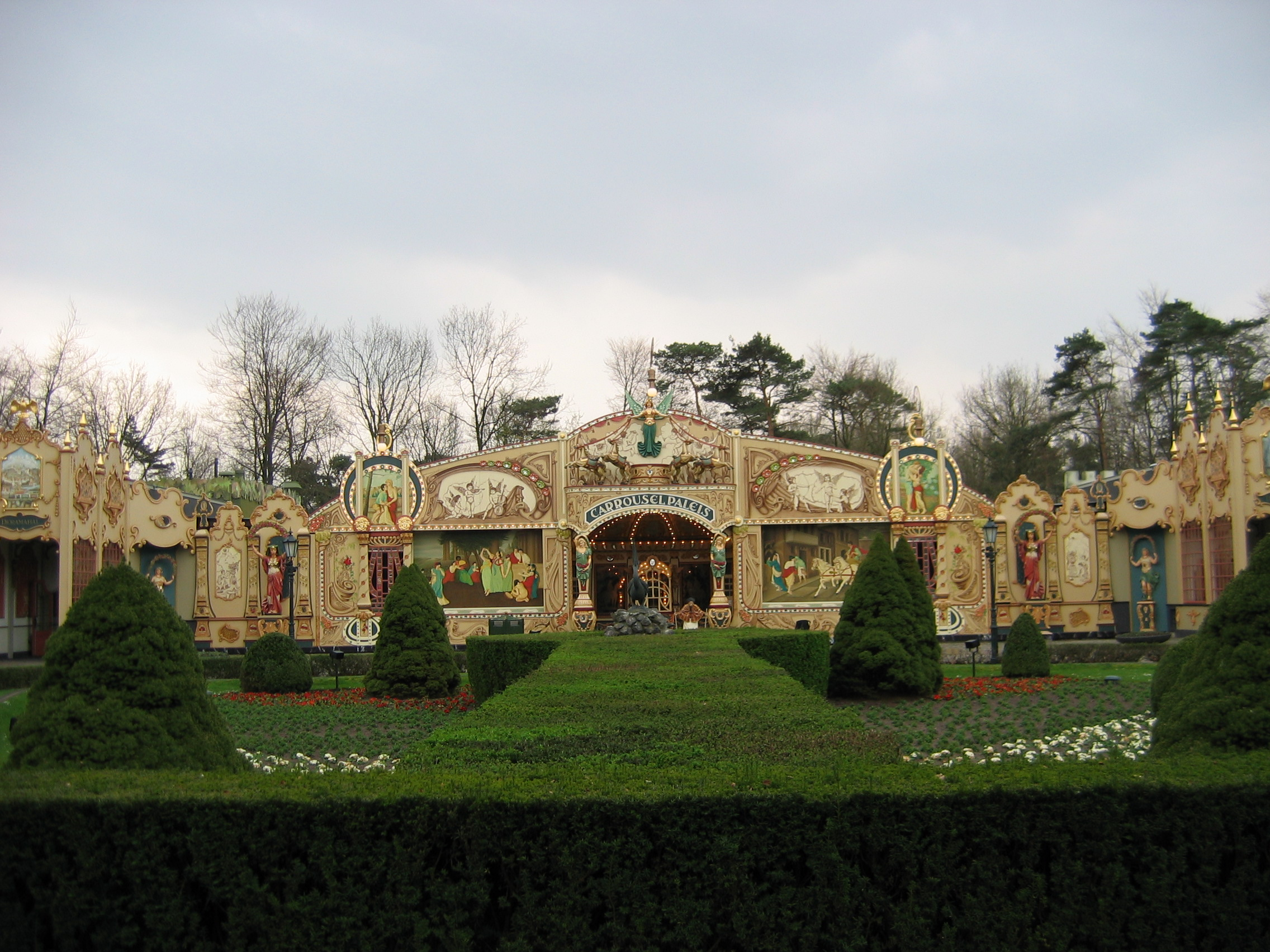
Stoomcarrousel

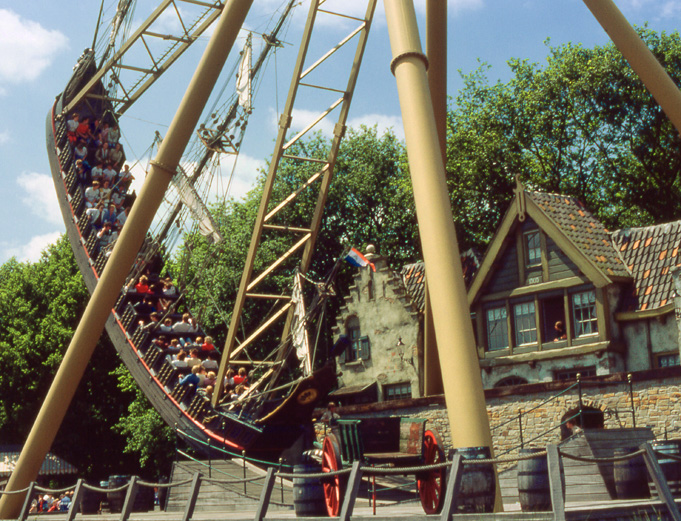
Halve Maen (Efteling)

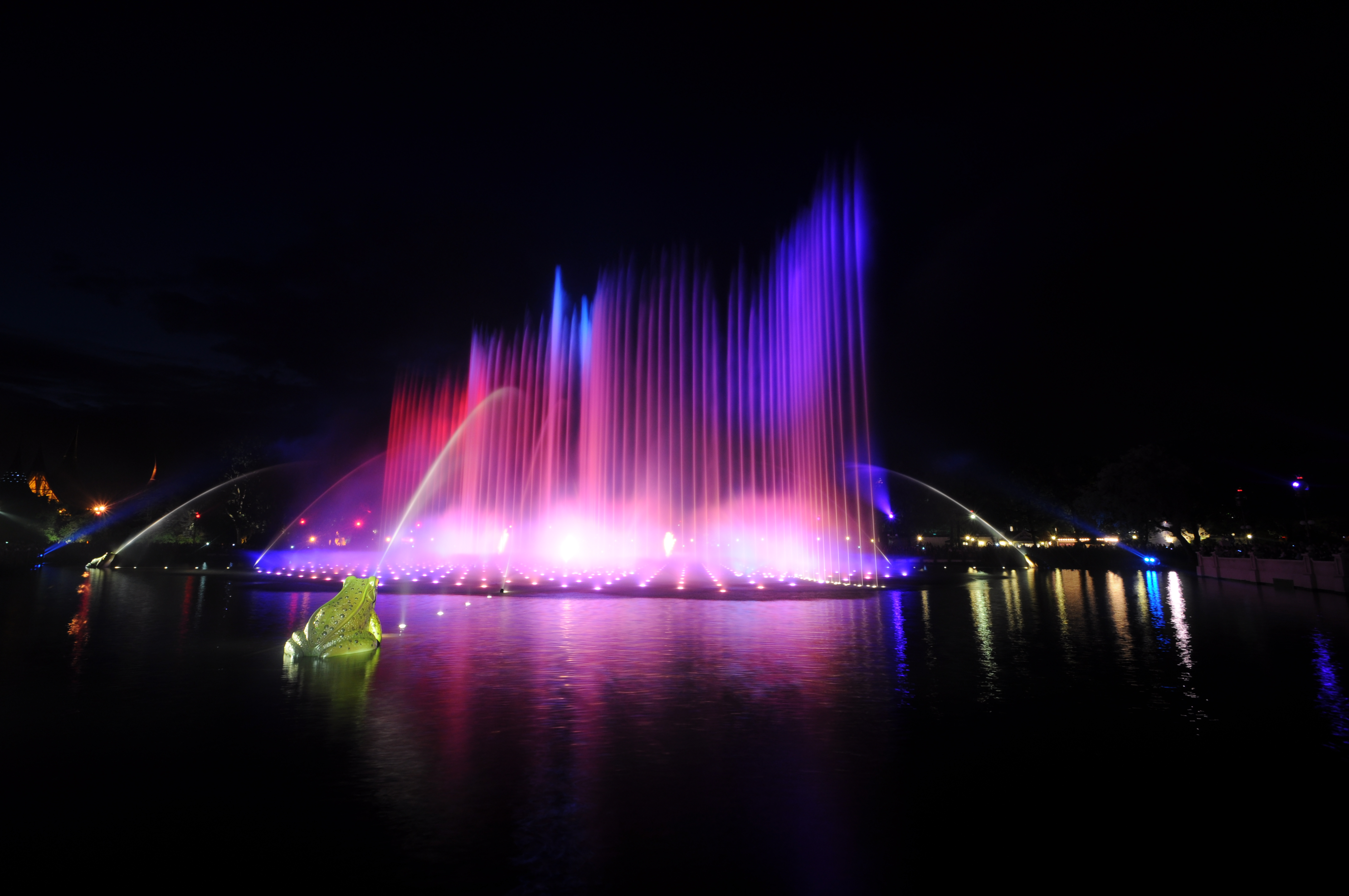
Aquanura
