= Halve Maen (Efteling) =

Pirate ship ride

Coordinates: 51.64881°N 5.0534°E

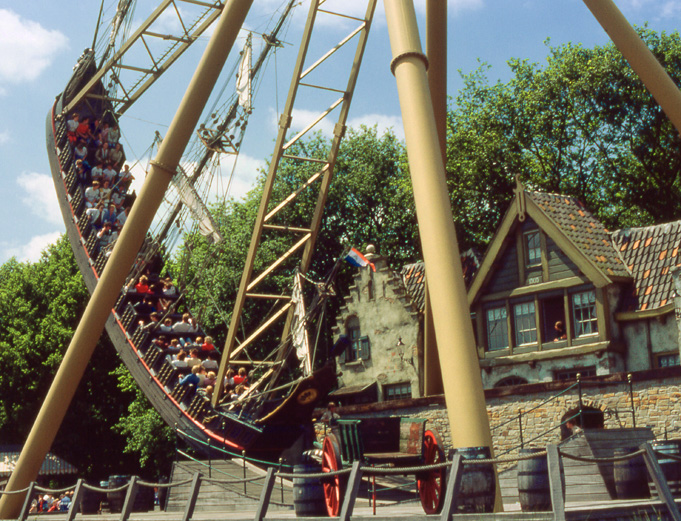
Halve Maen at the Efteling in 2007

Halve Maen (English: Half Moon) is a Pirate Ship ride at Efteling theme park in the Netherlands. Designed by Ton van de Ven and manufactured by Intamin, it opened its doors in 1982.

== History and details ==
The Pirate Ship is not actually themed as a “Pirate Ship”, but a copy of the VOC - merchant Halve Maen of the Dutch East India Co. VOC, the first limited company. The theming for the surroundings of the ride consists of a harbour in the Anton Pieck style.

It used to be the largest Pirate Ship in the world at opening, according to the Guinness Book of Records.

This record was taken away on March 3rd 1985 by Jumbo Viking at Nagashima Spa Land.

== The ride ==
- Ride Height: 20,5 meters
- Highest Swing: 24 meters
- Maximum Speed: 54 km/h
- g-forces: 0 negative
- Capacity: 84 visitors
