= The House of the Five Senses =

Main entrance of Efteling amusement park

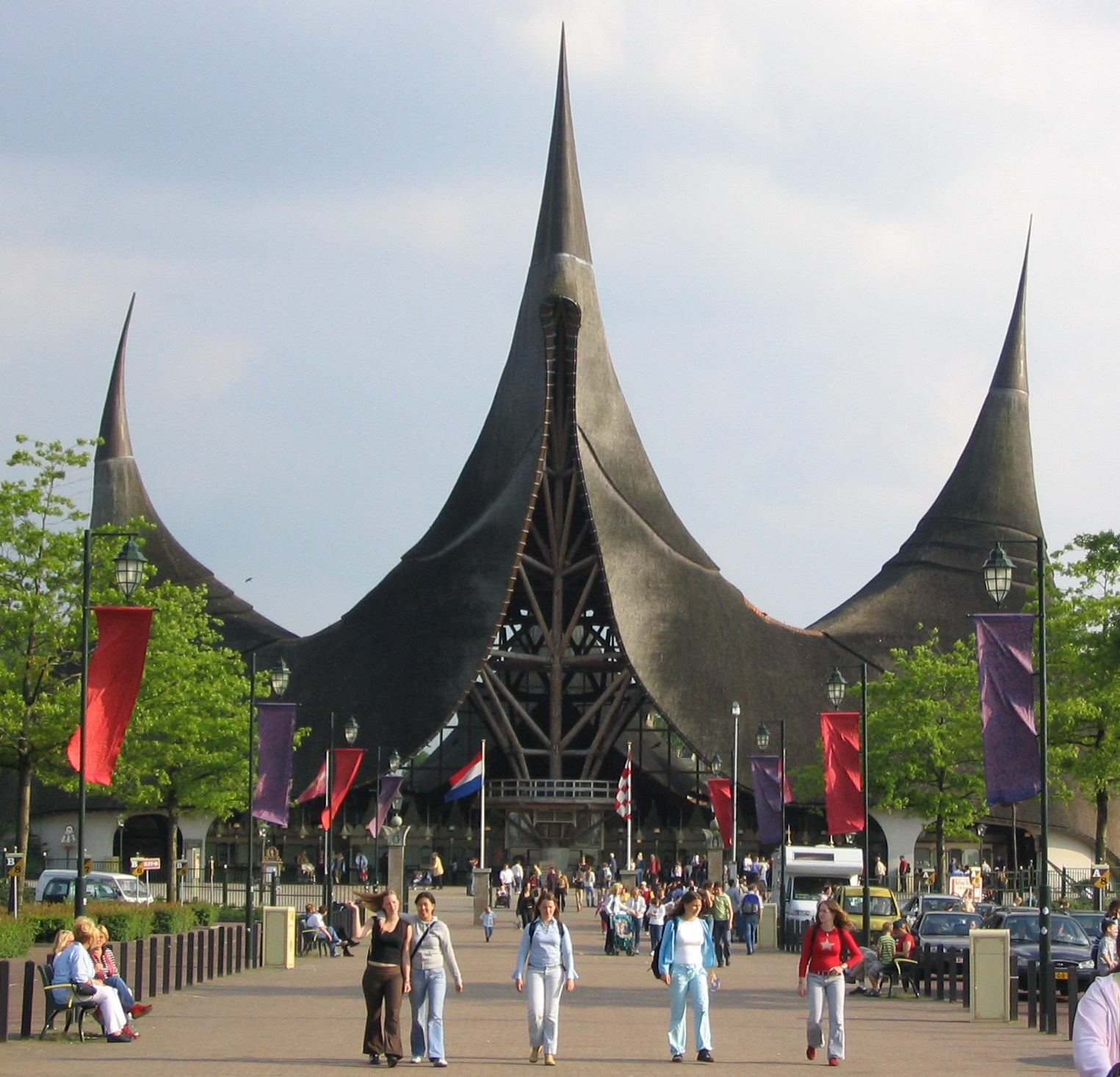
- Efteling's entrance

Efteling
- Coordinates: 51.64958°N 5.04369°E
- Status: Operating
- Opening date: 1996

The House of the Five Senses (original title: Huis van de Vijf Zintuigen) is the main entrance of amusement park Efteling in the Netherlands. It was designed by Ton van de Ven and went operational in 1996, a year later than planned due to a general strike in the construction sector.

== Details ==
The architecture is based on the Indonesian Rumah Gadang style of the Minangkabau ethnic group.

The 52-metre-high (171 ft) wooden construction has the largest reed roof (48437 square feet/ 4500 square metres) in the world, according to the Guinness Book of Records.

The five peaks of the roof symbolize the five senses, representing the experience of Efteling. Besides the entrance, customer service, a souvenir shop and a toilet group are located in the building.

== The story ==
“A long time ago, there ruled a king, but who got too old and sick to stay in power. He had five sons, who were meant to rule the country, each contributing with their special ability (one of the five senses). But they grew apart and the kingdom started falling apart. The old king’s court jester “Pardoes” (today’s park mascot) tried to get them together, and doing so requested an audience with each of the five sons.
To the first one he asked: “Can you hear what I’m thinking?”... –“No, only my brother can do that!... I see what you mean!!!”
To the second one he asked: “Can you see if people are honest?”…-“No, only my brother can do that!…I hear what you’re saying!!!”
Asking such questions to all the sons, he made them realise their interdependent relationship and brought them together, and the people built the House of the Five Senses, with the five peaks referring to the sons’ abilities, for them to rule together. It so happens that the park’s entrance passes through this building nowadays.”
