= Polka Marina =

Defunct merry-go-round at Efteling

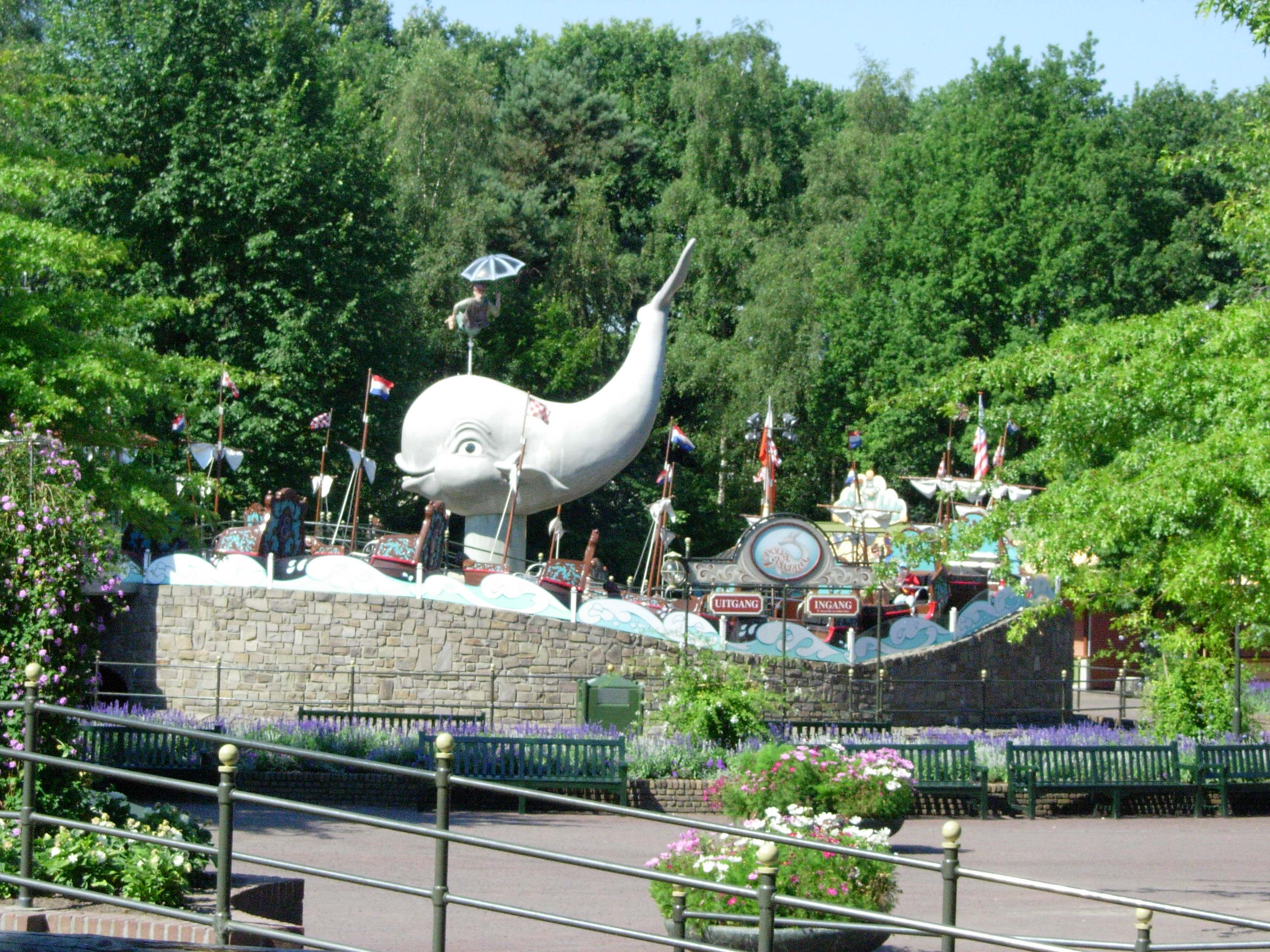
Polka Marina

Polka Marina was a Merry-go-round in the amusement park Efteling in the Netherlands. The attraction started operating in 1984. On 13 October 2020, Efteling announced that the attraction would make its last ride at the end of 2020 and would disappear from the park.

== History and details ==
Polka Marina was actually a combination of a carousel and a mini-roller coaster, since the cogs were circling up and down on a Vekoma coaster track.

The diameter of the track was 18 meters, with 23 cogs riding the track. In the center of the ride an 8 meter high whale fountain propelled a pirate into the air.

On October 13, 2020, Efteling announced that Polka Marina will disappear from Efteling after 36 years. On the site of the attraction, a new accessible playground called "Nest" would be built. The ride closed on November 30, 2020.
