= Anton Pieck Square =

Square in the Efteling

Coordinates: 51.6526°N 5.0493°E

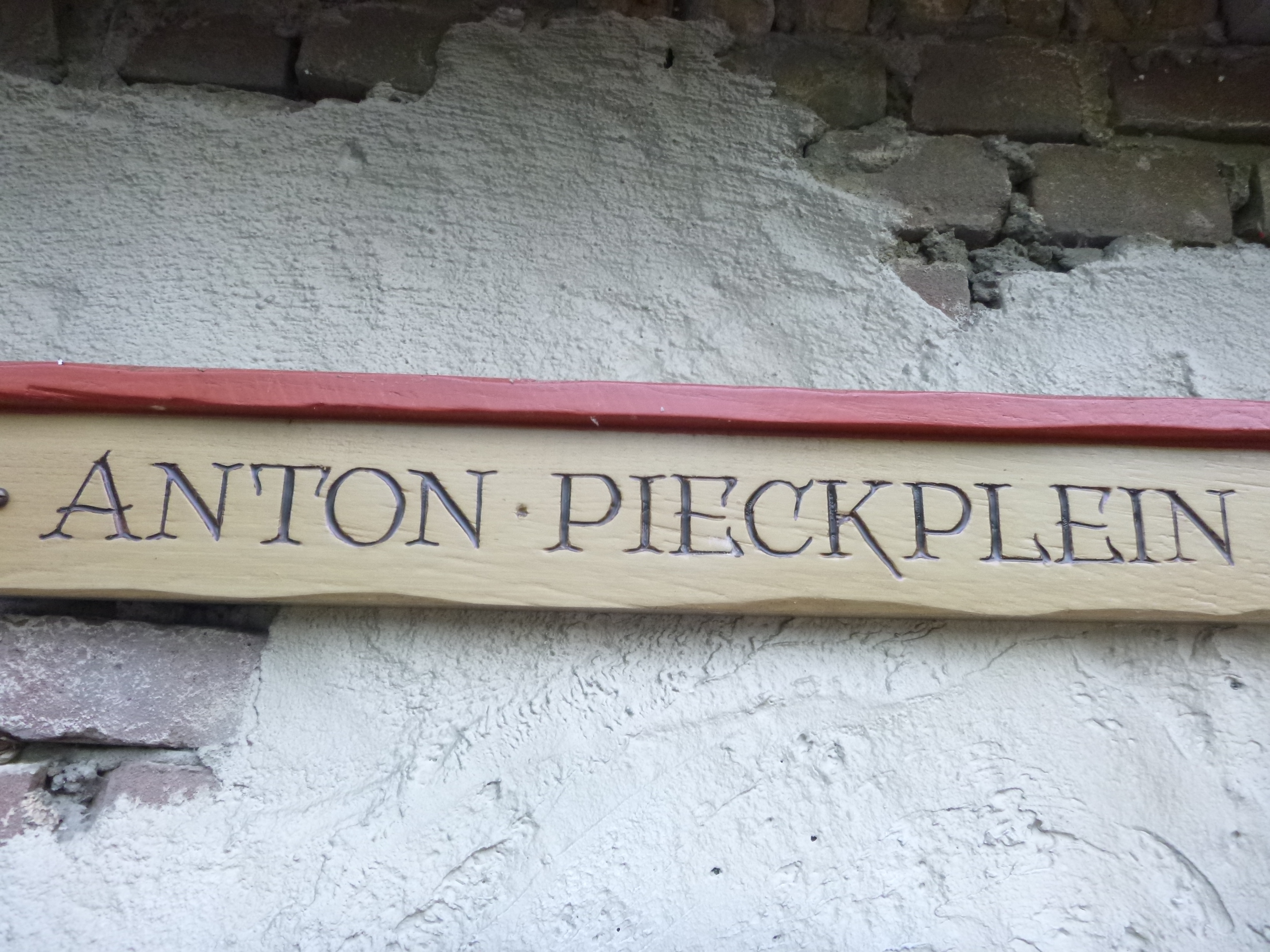
- Interactive map of Anton Pieck Square
- Theme: Anton Pieck

Efteling
- Status: Operating

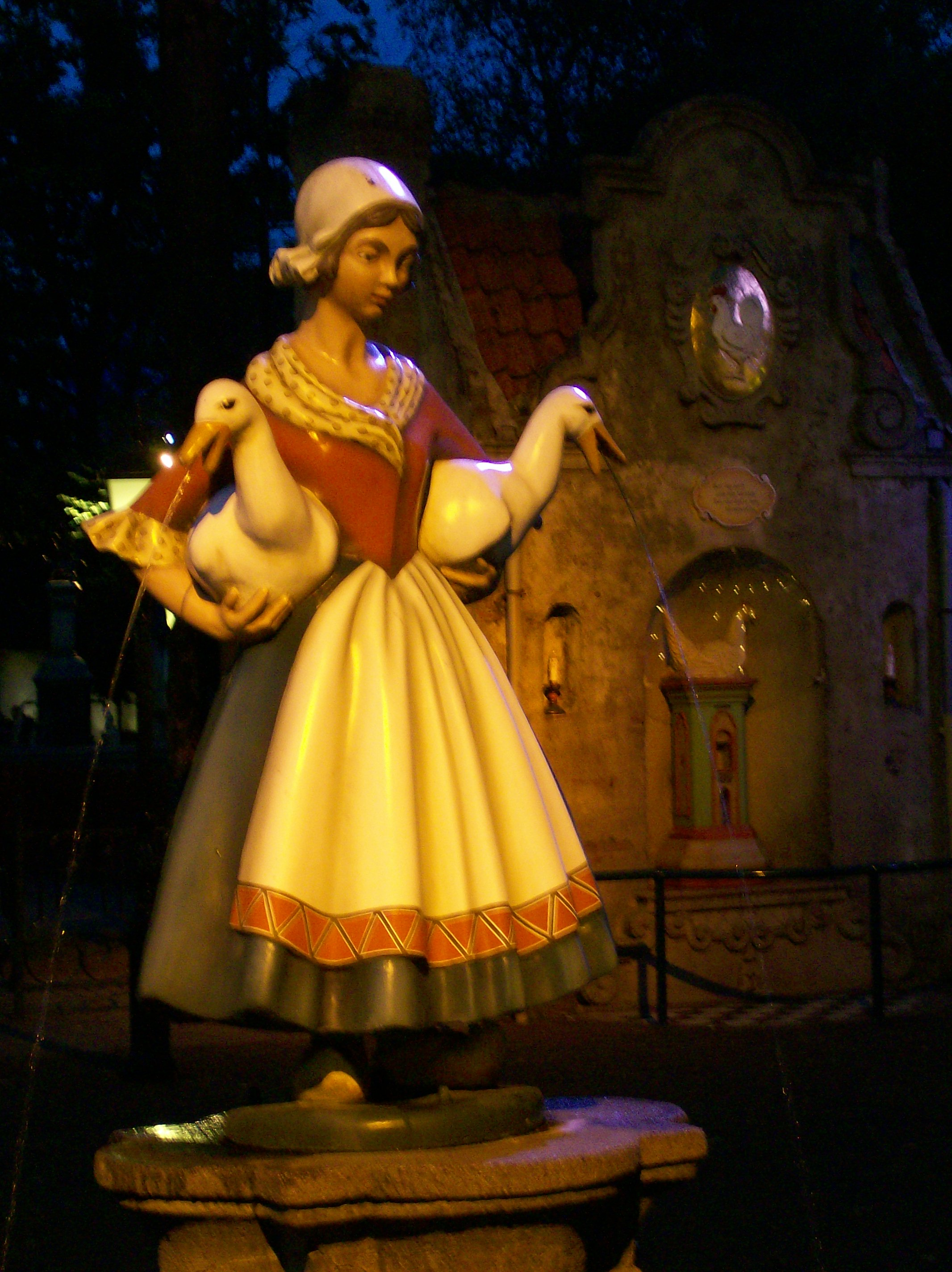
The Goose Girl and The Goose That Laid the Golden Eggs by night

The Anton Pieck Square is a square in the Efteling, a theme park in the Netherlands.

== History ==
It is named after - was and originally designed by - one of the park's founders, Anton Pieck. It hosts the Efteling Museum, 5 carousels, 6 small fairy tales, diners and a souvenir shop. In 2003 it was renovated by Michel den Dulk, based on drawings by Anton Pieck.

== The carousels ==
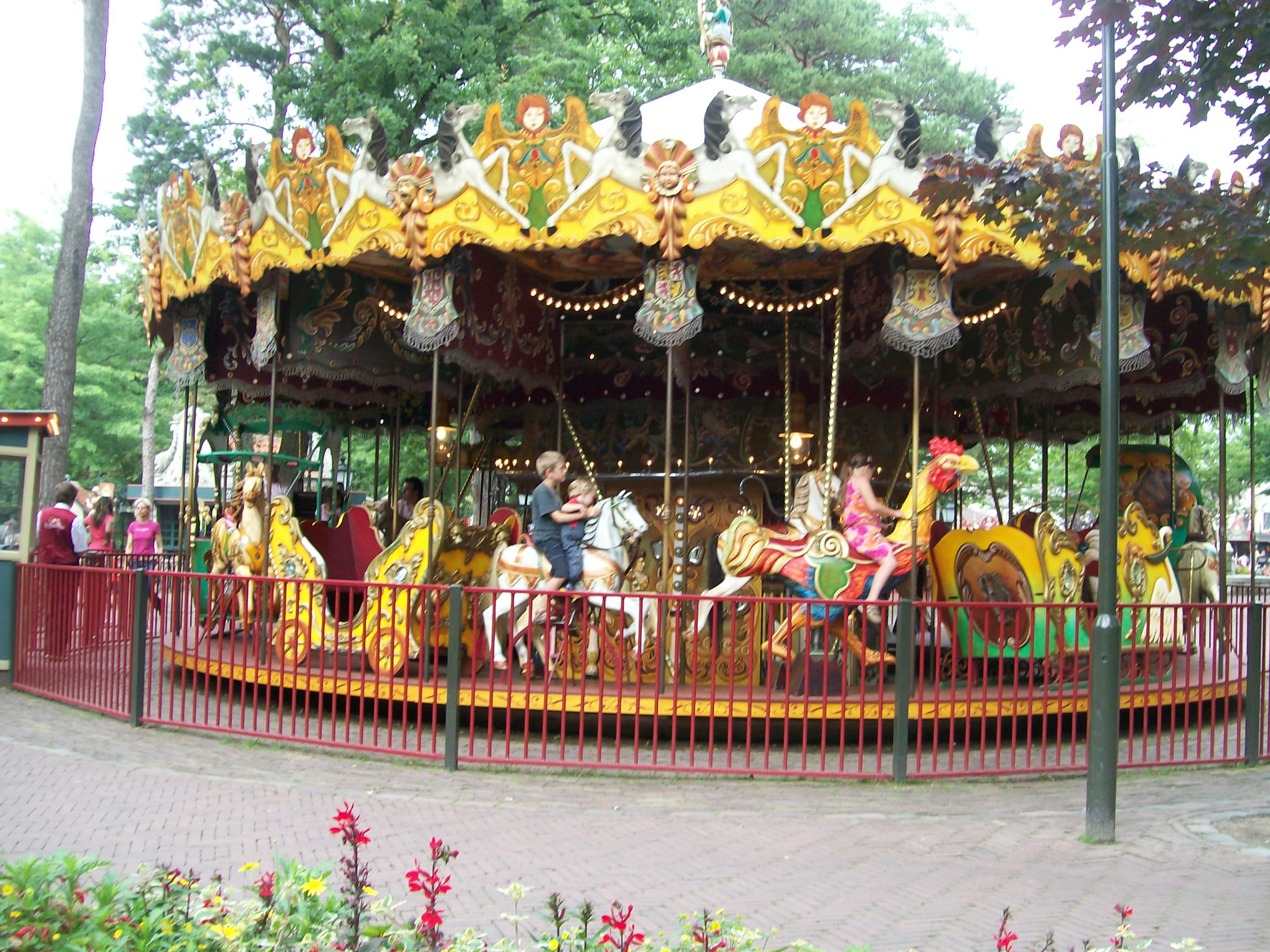
Vermolen Carousel

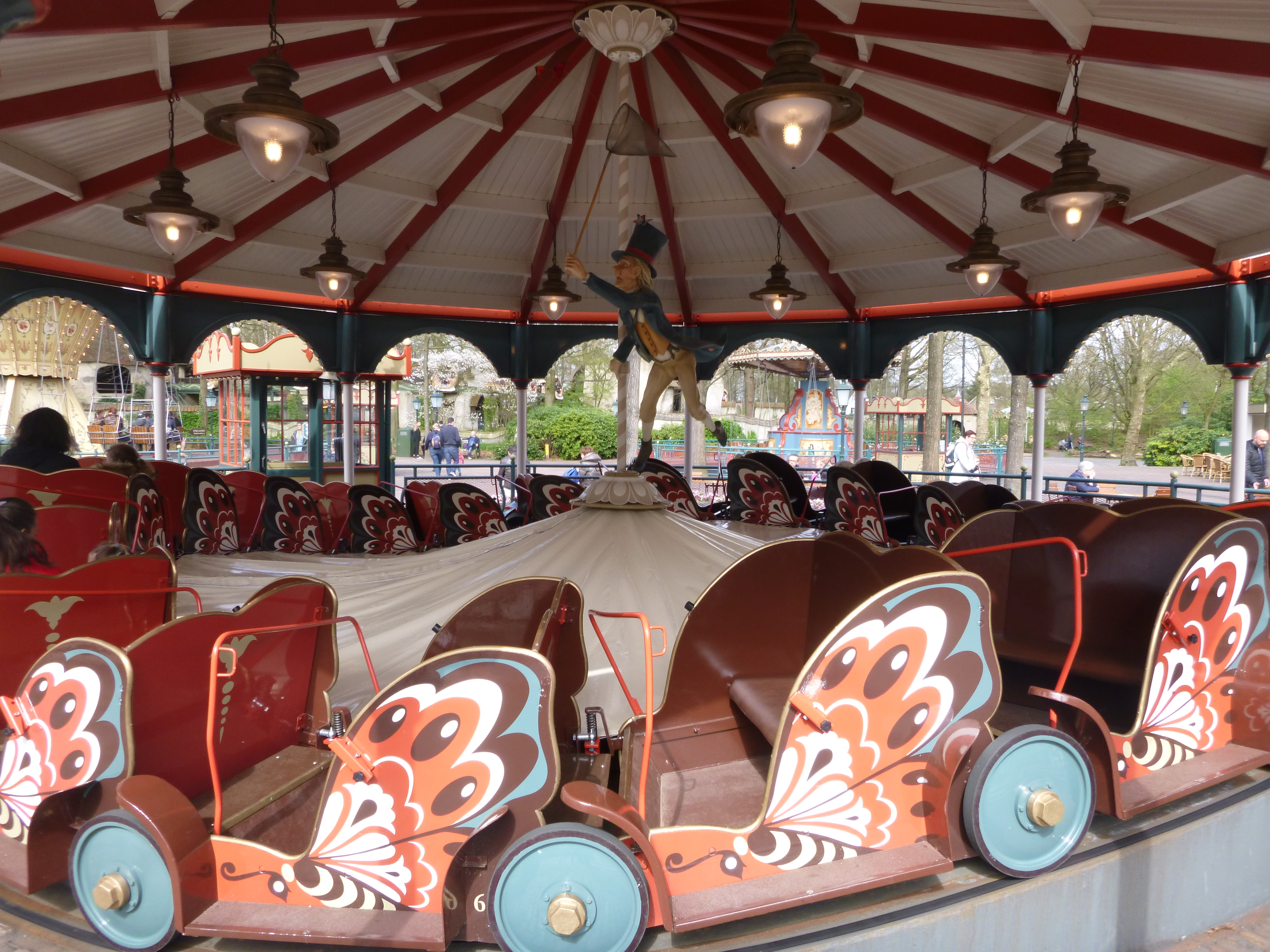
Butterfly Carousel

- The Anton Pieck Carousel, (created nearby 1900 by Arie Brunselaar) designed by Anton Pieck, it ended up in the Efteling in 1955;
- The Vermolen Carousel, originally bought by the Vermolen Brothers from the Giezen family (oldest carousel in the Netherlands (created in 1865), it ended up in the Efteling in the late 1980s);
- The Butterfly Carousel (Dutch: Vlindermolen), originally the Giesen family travelled with it since the late 1930s, it was bought by the Efteling and the theme changed to the house theme; It was bought by the Efteling in 1977.
- The Large Swing Carousel (Dutch: Grote Zweefmolen), it was also bought by the Efteling in 1977. This swing carousel was created nearby 1900.
- The Small Swing Carousel (Dutch: Kleine Zweefmolen), it was open by the Efteling in 1977.

== The Efteling Museum ==
The Efteling museum opened in 2003 showing artifacts from the research and development throughout the park's history. Its exposition is adapted to themes, anniversaries or other relevant events.
