= Diorama (Efteling) =

Miniature world

Coordinates: 51.651137°N 5.048886°E

Diorama is a miniature world in Efteling amusement park in the Netherlands. The highly detailed mountainous world, or Diorama, was designed by Anton Pieck and opened in 1971, in honour of the 20th birthday of Efteling.

The visitors can walk around a 60 metre long show-case with mountains, little villages, castles and churches, moving trains and automobiles and flowing water. Most of the Diorama is set in day-time, but a smaller part is devoted to night-time.

The landscape has been built entirely out of styrofoam. The Diorama is the first attraction with contributions from Ton van de Ven, the creative director of Efteling at that time. He made some sketches for it, but they weren't used for the Diorama; years later they were used for one of the scenes in the dark-ride Dreamflight.

The attraction was completely renovated in 2007, all rail tracks were replaced, switching mechanisms for the signals were removed and seven miniature attractions from the "real" Efteling were added.

== Trivia ==
- One of the wooden bridges over the railroad tracks in the first scene has collapsed and a new wooden bridge has been built next to it. It seems to be a creative idea, but it was actually stepped on by one of the builders by accident.
- Exceptionally, Märklin for many years manufactured the Minex steam trains specially for Efteling.
