= Aquanura =

Water fountain in the Efteling theme park

Coordinates: 51°38′53″N 5°02′42″E

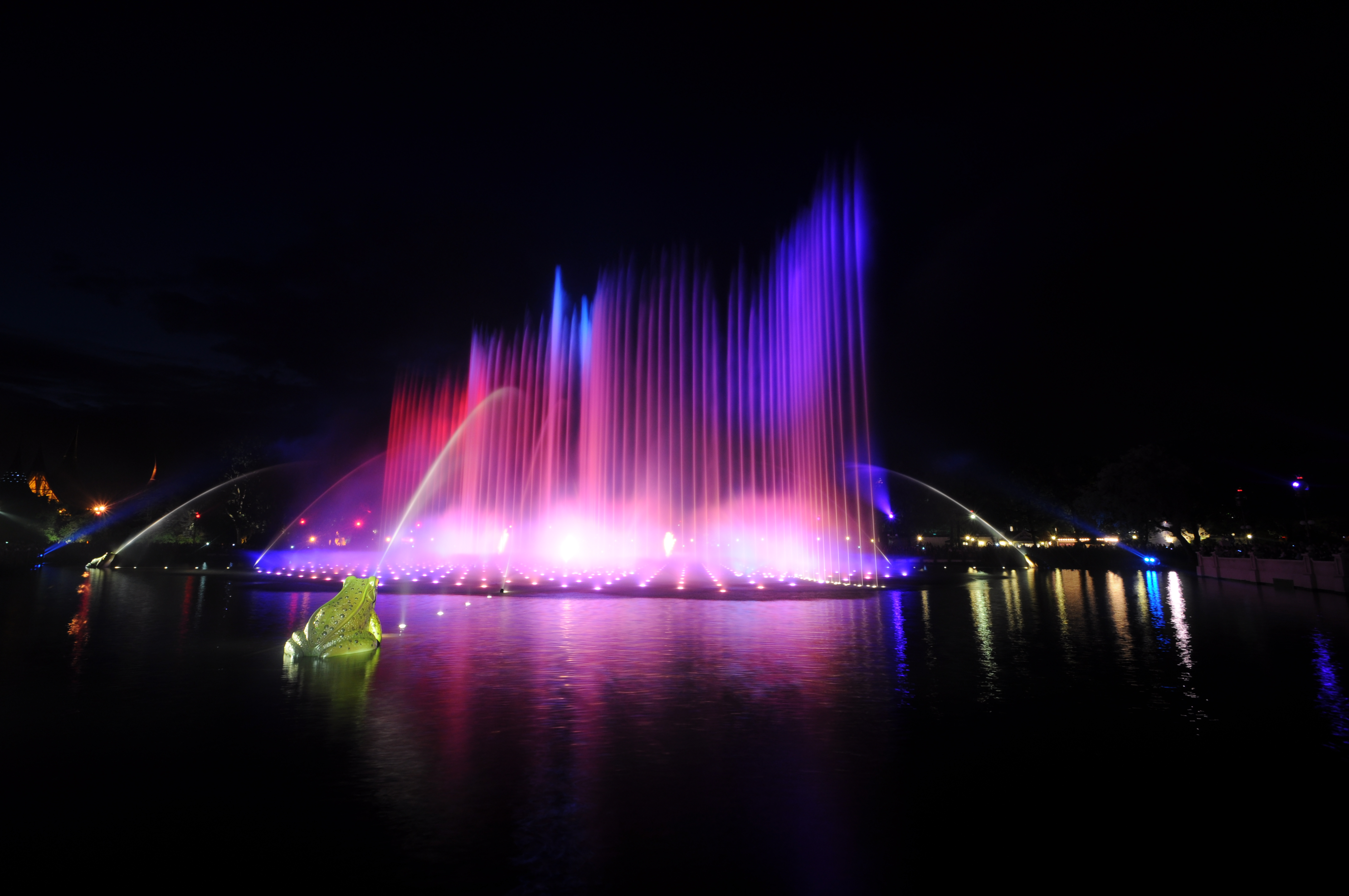
The Fountain's location is in the pond at the side of the Fata Morgana

Aquanura is the name of a fountain system in the Efteling theme park in the Netherlands. The premiere took place on 31 May 2012 on the park's 60th anniversary, and opened to the public the following day. The fountain was developed by WET Design, Efteling and Tebodin Consultants & Engineers. The fountain is the largest in Europe and the third largest in the world, after The Dubai Fountain and the Fountains of Bellagio, though it could better be compared as a smaller version of Disney's World of Color.

The show falls within the scope of the park's "Frog King" theme. As such, four large replica frogs are placed in the pond.

== The fountain ==
Aquanura has a total of 200 fountains, subdivided in nine types, each with its own reach and effect. Four of the types are custom designed and built for this project, as are the light effects.

800 lamps are placed in the pond, and 29 light and audio posts are placed around it, with moving heads on top, all in support of the water show.

The super shooters reach a height of 45 meters (148 ft), well under their listed capacity.

The whole project was constructed by Water Entertainment Technologies (WET), Tebodin Netherlands B.V., Heijmans NV, Kuijpers Piping & Procestechniek, Hoppenbrouwers Elektrotechniek B.V. and Primagaz Nederland B.V. at a total cost of €17,000,000. The watershow can normally be seen at closing time of the park, extra shows are scheduled on busy days and days with extended opening hours. Since the opening of the original Aquanura, the symphony has changed. It has been remade with a couple of new song added.

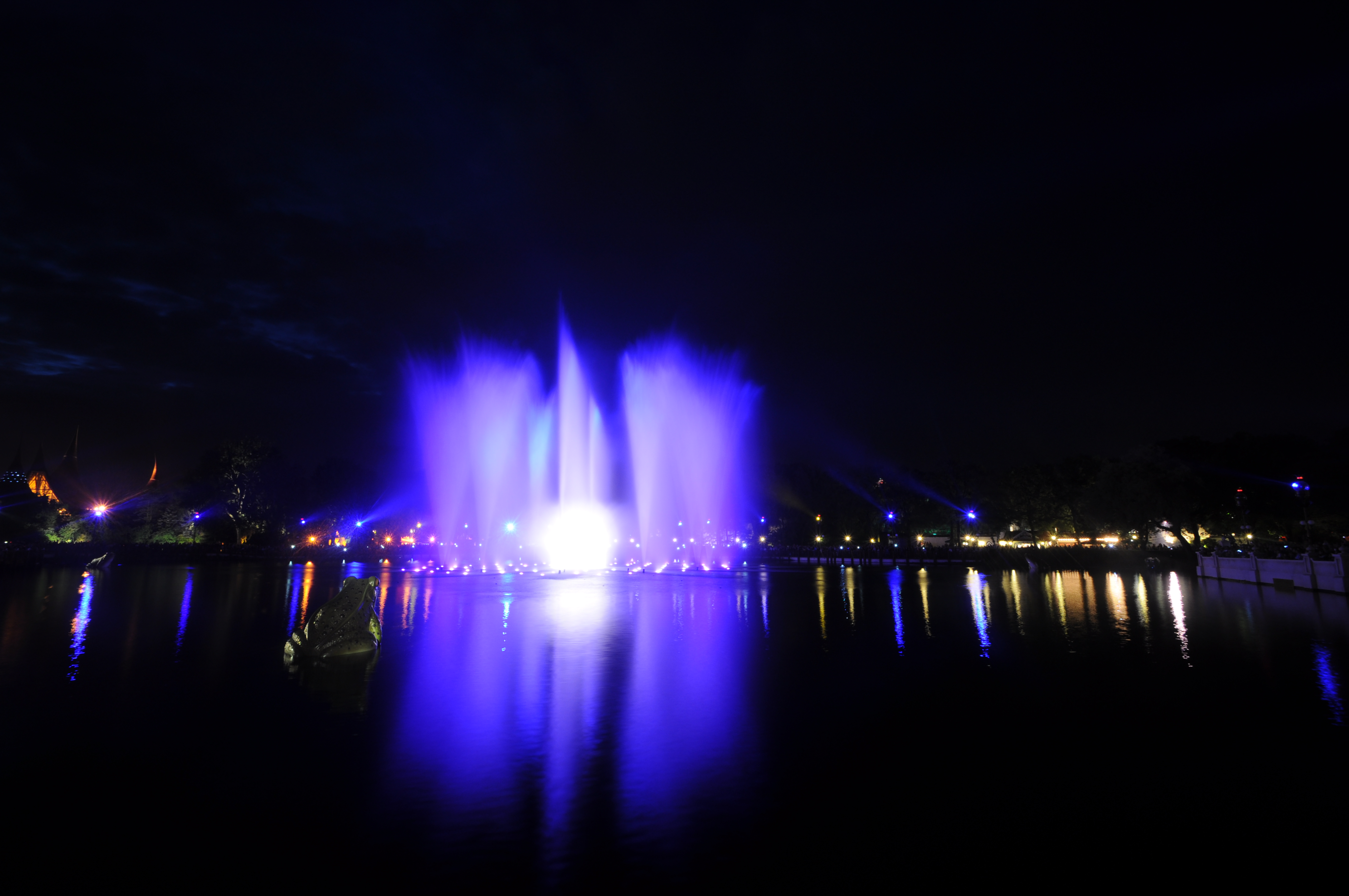

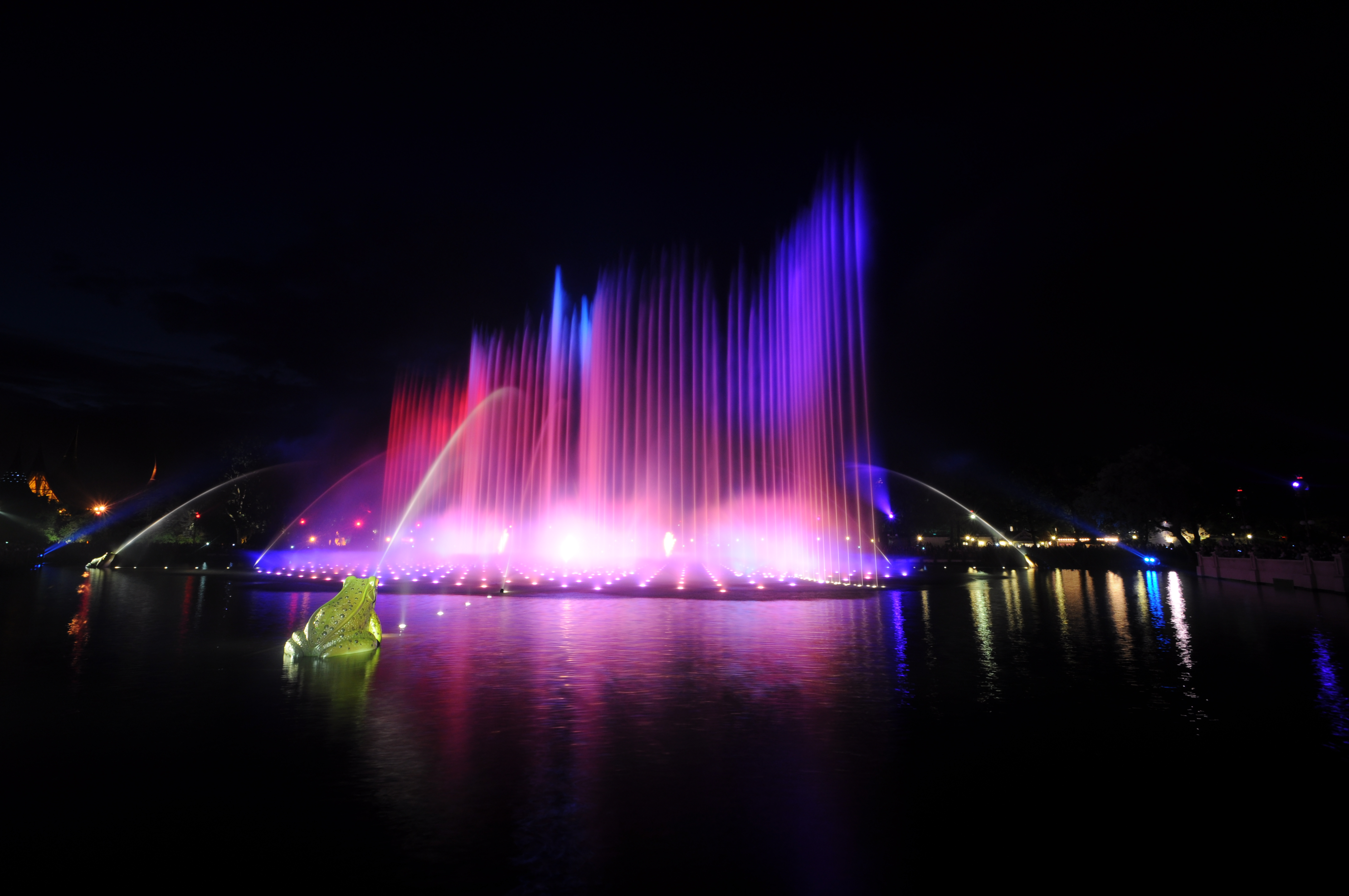

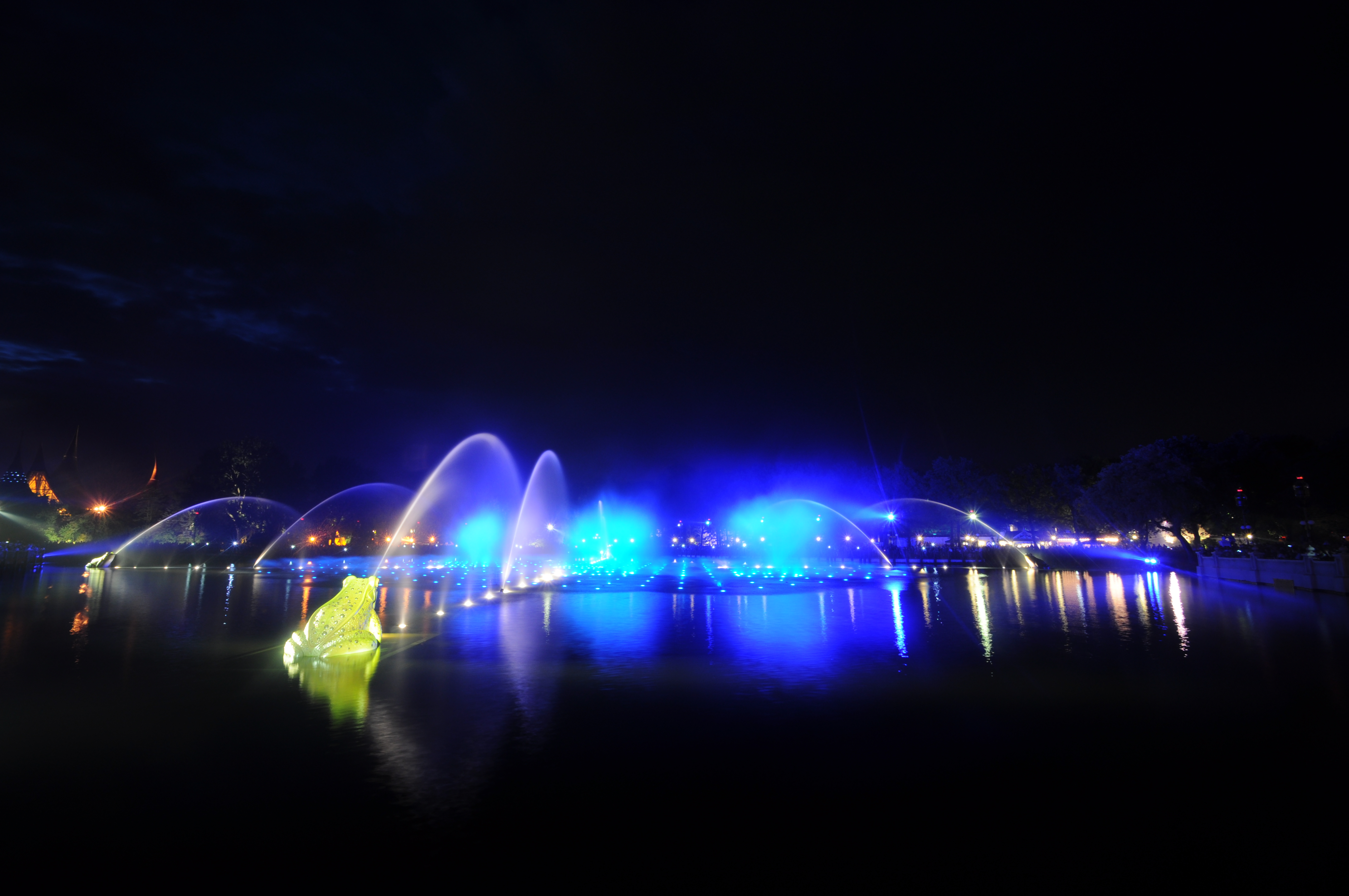

== Music ==
The music is a medley of compositions that are in the themes of other rides, performed by The Brabant Orchestra.

- The Magic Clock - By the Sleepy Lagoon (Eric Coates)
- Villa Volta - Main theme (Ruud Bos)
- The Magic Clock - by the sleepy lagoon
- The Indian Water Lilies (Bert Kaempfert)
- Carnival Festival (Toon Hermans)
- Ravelin (René Merkelbach)
- Dream flight - Castle Realm (Ruud Bos)
- Menuet in G (BWV Anh. 114) (Johann Sebastian Bach)
- Haunted Castle - Danse Macabre (Camille Saint-Saëns)

== Location ==
Aquanura is located in the Rowing Pond, next to the Fata Morgana in the themed area Fantasy Realm.

== New show ==
At the end of 2025, the fire effects were removed for sustainability reasons and replaced by the 'Beacons of Light'. As a result, a completely new show was created, named: 'Efteling Symphonica'. This is the newest Aquanura water show at Efteling, which premiered on December 11, 2024. This 14-minute show on the Vonderplas (now Meer van Fantasie) replaces older shows and presents a musical journey through time across ten well-known attractions, supported by 8-meter-high 'Beacons of Light'. Key details about Efteling Symphonica: Location: The water show takes place on the pond in front of Fata Morgana, now known as the Meer van Fantasie. Show content: The show uses musical themes specially composed for the Efteling Grand Hotel and the 5 park sections, among others. Technology: Instead of fire effects, this show uses 'Beacons of Light', large illuminated lanterns that give the show a modern character. Origin: The show replaces earlier versions, such as the First and Second Efteling Symphony, which ran until September 2024.

== See also ==
- 2012 in amusement parks
