= Karel Willemen =

Dutch designer

Karel Angèle Antonius Willemen (born May 15, 1967 in Dongen) is a Dutch designer. He is mainly recognized for his contributions to the fantasy-themed amusement park Efteling, located in Kaatsheuvel in the Netherlands.

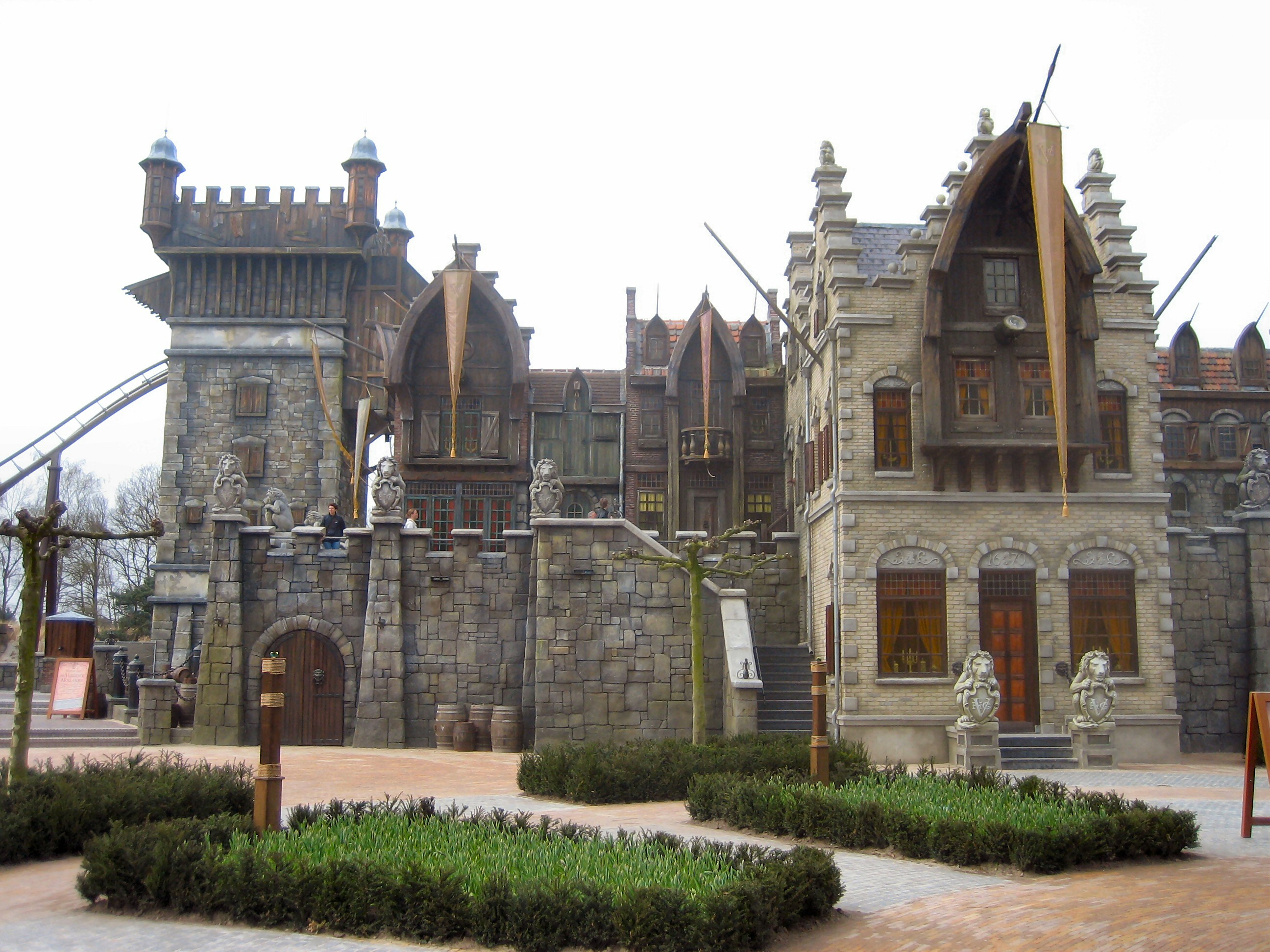
Front of the Flying Dutchman Coaster building

Willemen started at Efteling in 1988, after completing the Royal Academy for Arts and Design in Den Bosch, as a Senior Modeler, Sculptor and Decorator. In 2001 he moved completely to themes & design, and since 2005 he has been working as a Senior Designer for conceptual experience and theming.

== Efteling-portfolio ==
- Fairy Tales

- Fairy Tree
- Cinderella
- animatronic for The Castle of Sleeping Beauty
- model for the animatronic of Tom Thumb
- contributed at Rumpelstiltskin
- contributed at The Chinese Nightingale
- several contributions at The Wishing-Table

- Rides:

- Flying Dutchman
- theme for George and the Dragon
- contributed at Dreamflight
- contributed at The People of Laaf
- side entrance and other contributions for PandaVision
- design for new Python trains
- design for new Bob Track trains
- new waiting area and other contributions for Bird Rok

- Other creations:

- Forest Realm
- East Station (Station de Oost)
