= Henny Knoet =

Dutch designer

Henny Knoet (3 May 1942, in Bergen op Zoom – 26 August 2013, in Sprang-Capelle) was a Dutch designer. He is mainly recognized for his contributions for Efteling.

After having worked in Germany, Knoet started in 1979 at Efteling as a park planner. His own contributions are characterized by a frolic and colorful style. He retired in 2007 at the age of 65, stating that he wanted to make room for new designers.

== Efteling-portfolio ==
- Fairy Tales

- Contributed at Snow White.
- Contributed at the Herald Square.
- The Inn at The Wishing-Table, the Gold-Ass, and the Cudgel in the Sack.
- Little Nijl in the Washtub.

Torture scene Fata Morgana

- Rides

- Tin Lizzies
- Game gallery
- Torture scene Fata Morgana
- Monsieur Cannibale
- Children's Maze
- Toddler Garden
- Pardoesmobile

- Other creations:

- Pardoes, the park’s mascot
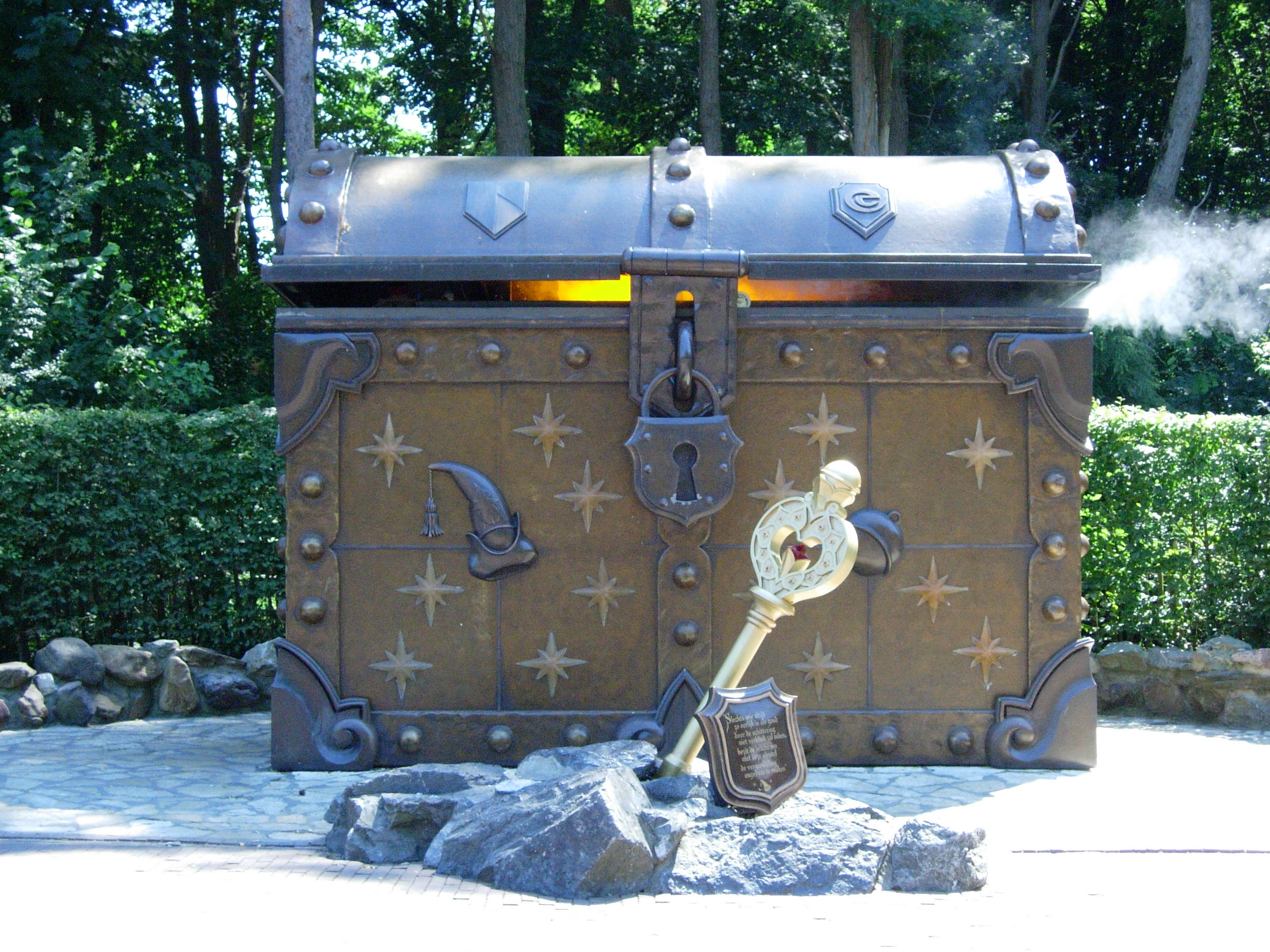
  A themed ATM
- Park Map
- Pardoes Promenade and Brink
- ATM’s Treasure Chest and Bank
