= Ton van de Ven =

Dutch industrial designer

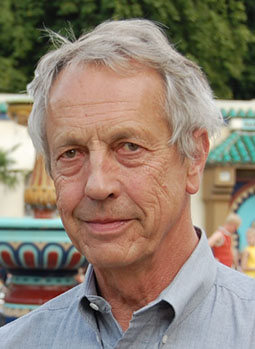
- Born: Antonius Hendrikus Maria van de Ven; 1 January 1944; Eindhoven, Netherlands
- Died: 16 September 2015 (aged 71); Tilburg, Netherlands
- Known for: Creative director at Efteling

Ton van de Ven (1 January 1944 – 16 September 2015) was a Dutch industrial designer. He is best known as the creative director at the Efteling theme park.

Van de Ven was born in Eindhoven, Netherlands, where he also studied at the Design Academy.

== Work at Efteling ==
After graduation in 1963, Van de Ven applied for a job at Efteling in 1965. Anton Pieck, leading designer at the time, only asked him one question: "Do you master perspective?" Ton bent the truth a little to say that he did. He then started to work with Pieck on various aspects of the park, gradually developing his own style, which never conflicted with the existing styles in the park.

Van de Ven's first project was to work with Pieck on the Indian Waterlilies. After a few sketches Pieck was convinced that he could fully trust the park in the hands of Van de Ven. When Pieck retired in 1975, Ton became the creative director of the park.

Van de Ven's first "own" ride was the Haunted Castle ("Spookslot") in 1978, the first big attraction in the park. He created many of the current Efteling landmarks, of which Fata Morgana and Dreamflight are considered to be his masterpieces.

In 2002 Van de Ven retired from the park, and he could concentrate on his hobby – creating large paintings and sculptures of women. In Efteling, part of the St. Nicolaas square is renamed to Ton van de Ven square in his honor and his portrait appears in Villa Volta.

== Efteling Portfolio ==
=== Rides ===
- Haunted Castle (Dutch: Spookslot, Haunted attraction, 1978)
- Half Moon (Dutch: Halve Maen, Ship swing, 1982)
- Piraña (river rapids ride, 1983)
- Tin Lizzies (1984)
- Fata Morgana (dark ride, 1986)
- Pagoda (Observation tower, 1987)
- The People of Laaf (1990)
- Dreamflight (Dutch: Droomvlucht, dark ride, 1992)
- Villa Volta (madhouse, 1996)
- Bird Rok (Dutch: Vogel Rok, Enclosed Roller Coaster, 1998)

=== Fairy Tales ===
- Snow White (revision with Anton Pieck, 1975)
- Long neck (revision, 1978)
- Hansel and Gretel (revision with Anton Pieck, 1978)
- The Flying Dragon (1979)
- The Gnome Village (extension, 1980)
- Sleeping Beauty (revision, 1981)
- Flying Fakir (revision, 1987)
- Troll King (1988)
- Tom Thumb (1998)
- Rumpelstiltskin (1998)
- The Nightingale (new version, 1999)
- Rapunzel (2001)

=== Other ===
- Various variants of Holle Bolle Gijs (1980–1988)
- The House of the Five Senses (entrance, 1995)
- Efteling Theater (2002)
