= Efteling Theatre =

Theatre in Loon op Zand, The Netherlands

Coordinates: 51°38′54″N 5°02′36″E

Theater Efteling (or "Efteling Theatre" in English) is a theatre in the amusement park Efteling in the Netherlands. It was designed by Ton van de Ven and opened its doors in 2002.

== History and details ==
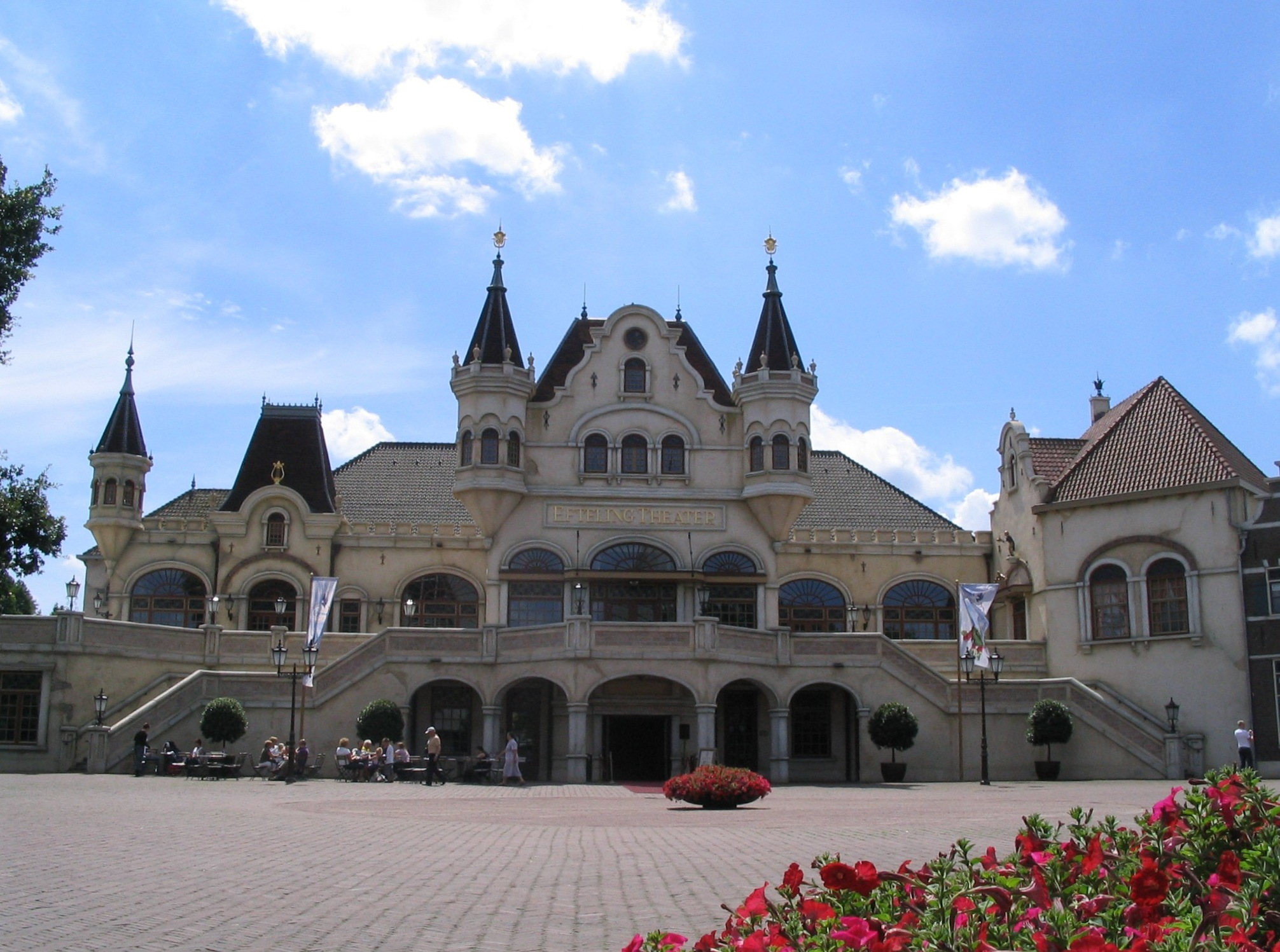
Front of the theatre

Theater de Efteling is one of the five big theatres in the Netherlands. Designed by van de Ven, it matches the typical Efteling style. The surroundings consist of old Dutch warehouses. In addition to the theatre facilities, the building holds a large foyer and a restaurant. The total building costs added up to €20 million.

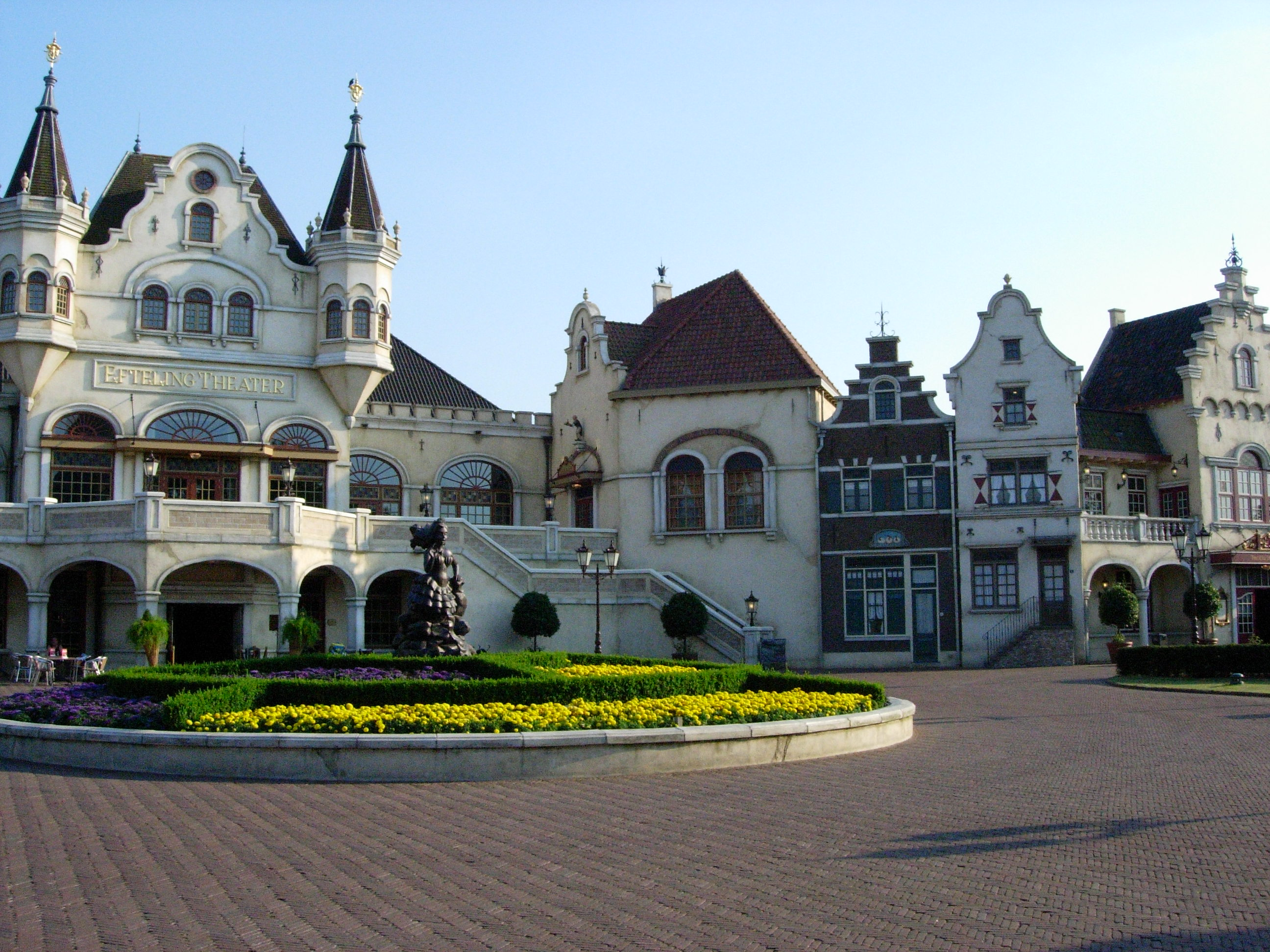
Old Dutch warehouses, combining the Victorian style of the theatre with the Golden Age of the Netherlands

== Shows ==
During the theatre's first nine years, shows were performed here four times a day from 2 pm onward at 90-minute intervals:

- The Wondrous Efteling Show (or "De Wonderlijke Eftelingshow" in Dutch) (2002–2004)
- Pardoes [the park mascot] and the Children Winter Wonder Party ("Pardoes en het Kinder Winter Wonderfeest" in Dutch) (Winter Efteling 2002-2003)
- Efteling Fairy Tale Show (“Efteling Sprookjesshow" in Dutch) (2005–2006) - show commemorating the 200th anniversary of Hans Christian Andersen
- Tika’s Birthday ("Tika is Jarig" in Dutch) (2007–2008)

From 2011 on, these shows will be separate from the theater in the park's new show facility Ravelijn.

Also, every year there is a large musical production in the theatre (not combined with park admission). Large productions thus far:

- Sleeping Beauty ("Doornroosje" in Dutch) (November 2003 - February 2004)
- The Little Mermaid ("De Kleine Zeemeermin" in Dutch) (November 2004 - March 2005)
- Tita the Wizard ("TiTa Tovenaar" in Dutch) (November 2005 - March 2006)
- Annie (November 2006 - March 2007)
- Cinderella ("Assepoester" in Dutch) (November 2007 – March 2008)
- Fairy Tree: The Musical ("Sprookjesboom: De Musical" in Dutch) (August 2009 - April 2010)
- The Sound of Music (November 2009 - January 2010)
- Kruimeltje (November 2010 - May 11)
- Droomvlucht (October 2011 - April 2012)
- Fairy Tree: The Musical, a gi-ga-gantic adventure ("Sprookjesboom: De musical, Een gi-ga-gantisch avontuur" in Dutch) (September 2012 - February 2013)
- Sandman ("Klaas Vaak" in Dutch) (September 2013 - February 2014)
- Fairy Tree: The Musical, a wonderful music party ("Sprookjesboom: De musical, een wonderlijk muziekfeest" in Dutch) (September 2014 - March 2015)
- Pinocchio (September 2015 - March 2016)
- Puss In Boots (September 2016 - April 2017)
- De Sprookjessprokkelaar (September 2017 - April 2018)
- Caro (September 2018 - ongoing (interrupted by the COVID-19 pandemic in the Netherlands))
