= Roc (mythology) =

Legendary bird in Middle Eastern mythology

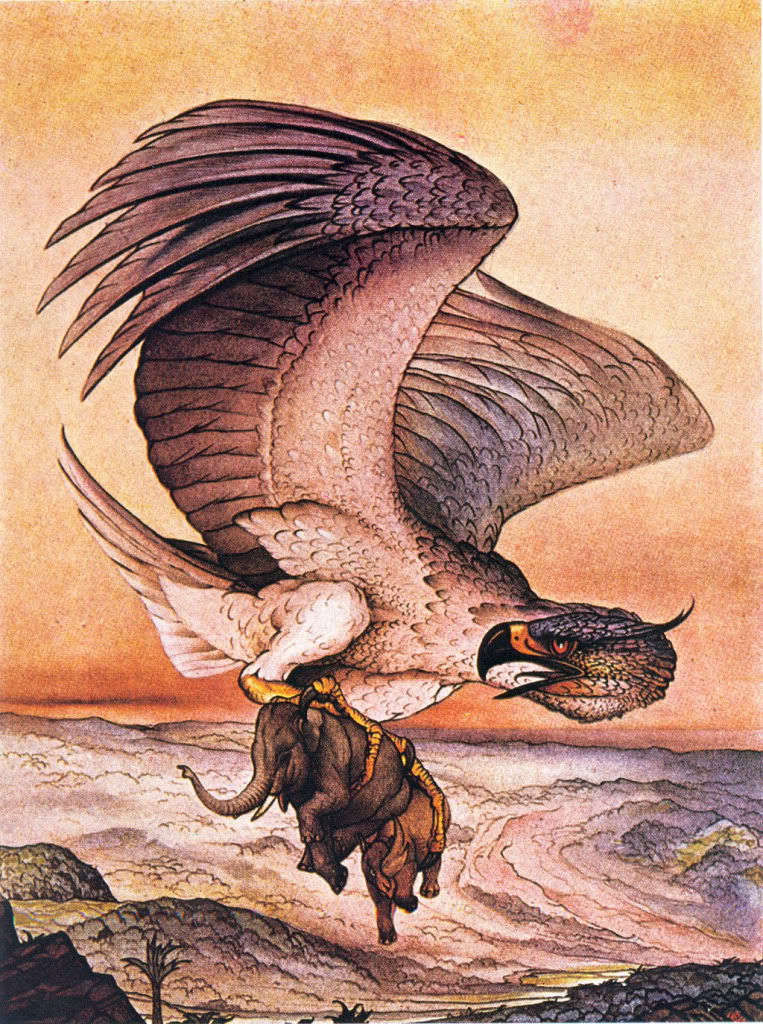
- Roc by Edward Julius Detmold

Creature information
- Other name: Rukh
- Grouping: Mythology
- Similar entities: Simurgh, Ziz, phoenix, thunderbird, Garuḍa, Dàpéng
- Folklore: Middle Eastern

Origin
- Details: Air

The roc is a legendary bird of prey which featured in popular mythology of the Middle East, consistently depicted with an enormous size, allowing it to dispatch elephants with minimal effort.

The roc appears in Arab geographies and natural history, popularized in Arabian fairy tales and sailors' folklore. The roc features in the story collection One Thousand and One Nights, which includes the bird in two tales; "Abd al-Rahman the Maghribi's Story of the Rukh" and "Sinbad the Sailor".

== Etymology ==
The English form roc originates via Antoine Galland's French from Arabic ruḵḵ (Arabic: الرُخّ, romanized: ar-ruḫḫ) and that from Persian ruḵ (Dari pronunciation: [/rux/]). In both languages, Arabic and Persian, the word is written in the Arabic script as رخ. Common romanizations are ruḵḵ for the Arabic form and ruḵ, rokh or rukh for the Persian form. The name shahrokh is also seen. The term shah means "king".

== Inspiration ==
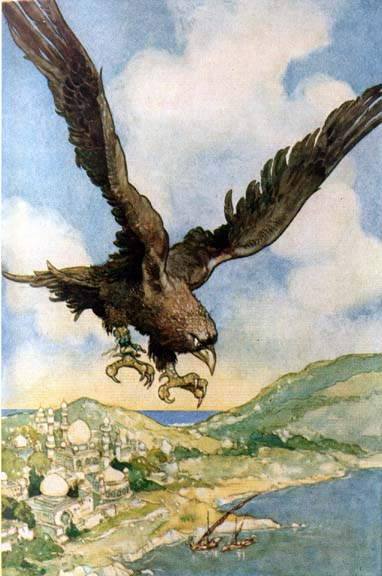
Illustration by René Bull

According to art historian Rudolf Wittkower, the idea of the roc had its origins in the story of the fight between the Indian solar bird Garuda and the chthonic serpent Nāga. The mytheme of Garuda carrying off an elephant that was battling a crocodile appears in two Sanskrit epics, the Mahabharata (I.1353) and the Ramayana (III.39). The Ath Kadha Lihini (Warana) of Sri Lankan mythology is a large bird which hunted elephants and cast a shadow as big as a cloud as it soared above. Embekka Temple has wood carvings depicting its likeness.

According to another scholar, however, "there is weak evidence suggesting that the Rukh is directly associated with the Persian Simurgh or the Indian Gäruda birds". Rather, he argues that the myth is more connected to the Arabic ˁAnqāˀ, "a pre-Islamic giant bird with a human face and four wings, [whose] name was derived from its long white neck". It was said to have lived around Jerusalem during the time of Moses. The first textual reference is in Abü Muhammed Abdullah ibn Hàmid's (326–331) book Dalail al-nubuwwah.

Rabbi Benjamin of Tudela reported a story reminiscent of the roc in which shipwrecked sailors escaped from a desert island by wrapping themselves in ox-hides and letting griffins carry them off as if they were cattle.

== Depictions ==
=== Ethiopian traditions ===
The rukh is identified in the abridged Arabic version of the Kebra Negast, an Ethiopian holy book, as the agent responsible for delivering the blessed piece of wood to Solomon which enabled him to complete Solomon's Temple. This piece of wood also is said to have transformed the Queen of Sheba's foot from that of a goat to that of a human. The piece of wood that the rukh brought was therefore given an honored place in the Temple that Solomon built and decorated with silver rings. According to tradition, these silver rings were given to Judas Iscariot as payment for betraying Jesus; the piece of wood became Jesus's cross.

=== Marco Polo ===
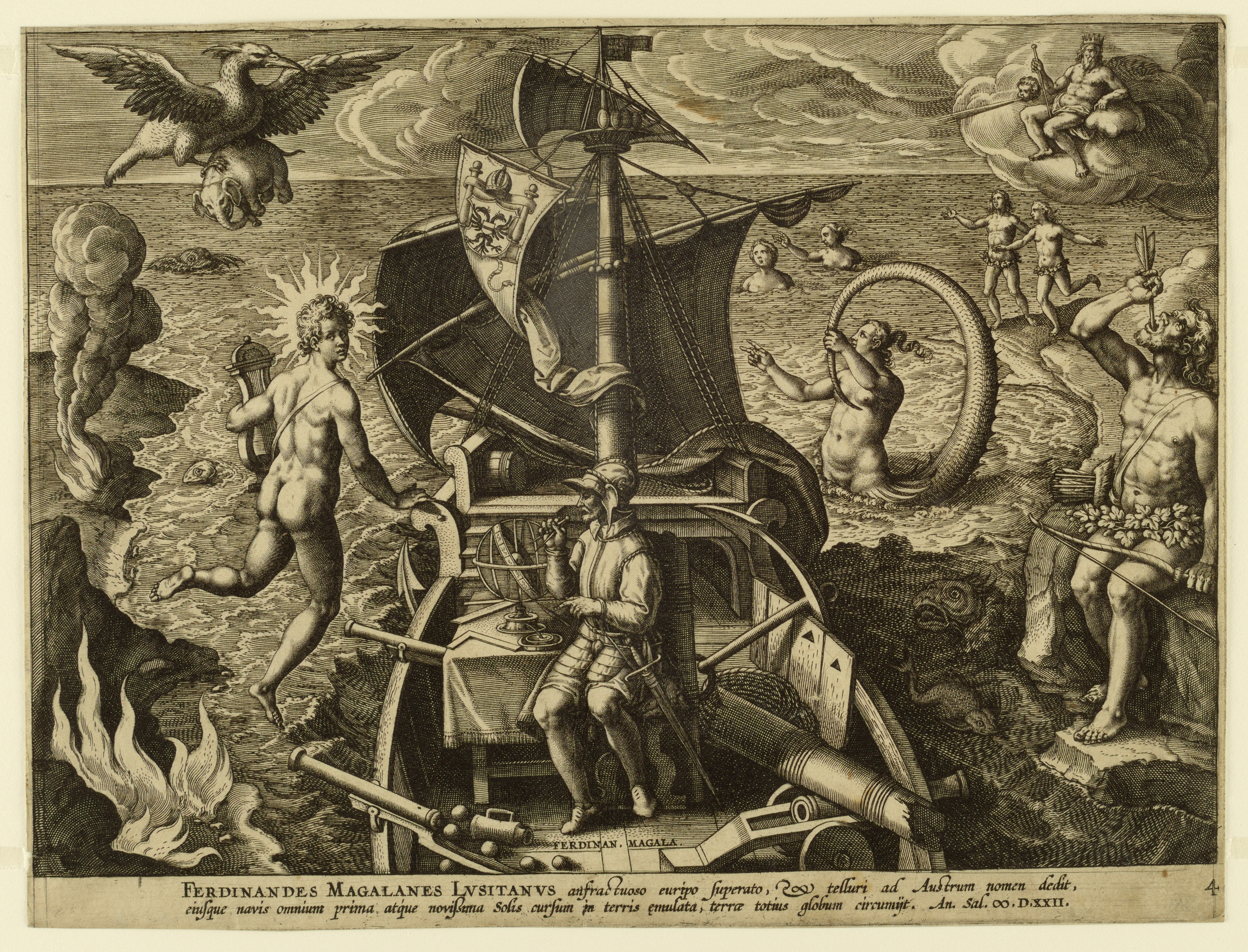
Elephant Carried Away by a Roc after design by Stradanus, 1590

As quoted in Attenborough (1961: 32), Marco Polo stated:

It was for all the world like an eagle, but one indeed of enormous size; so big in fact that its quills were twelve paces long and thick in proportion. And it is so strong that it will seize an elephant in its talons and carry him high into the air and drop him so that he is smashed to pieces; having so killed him, the bird swoops down on him and eats him at leisure.

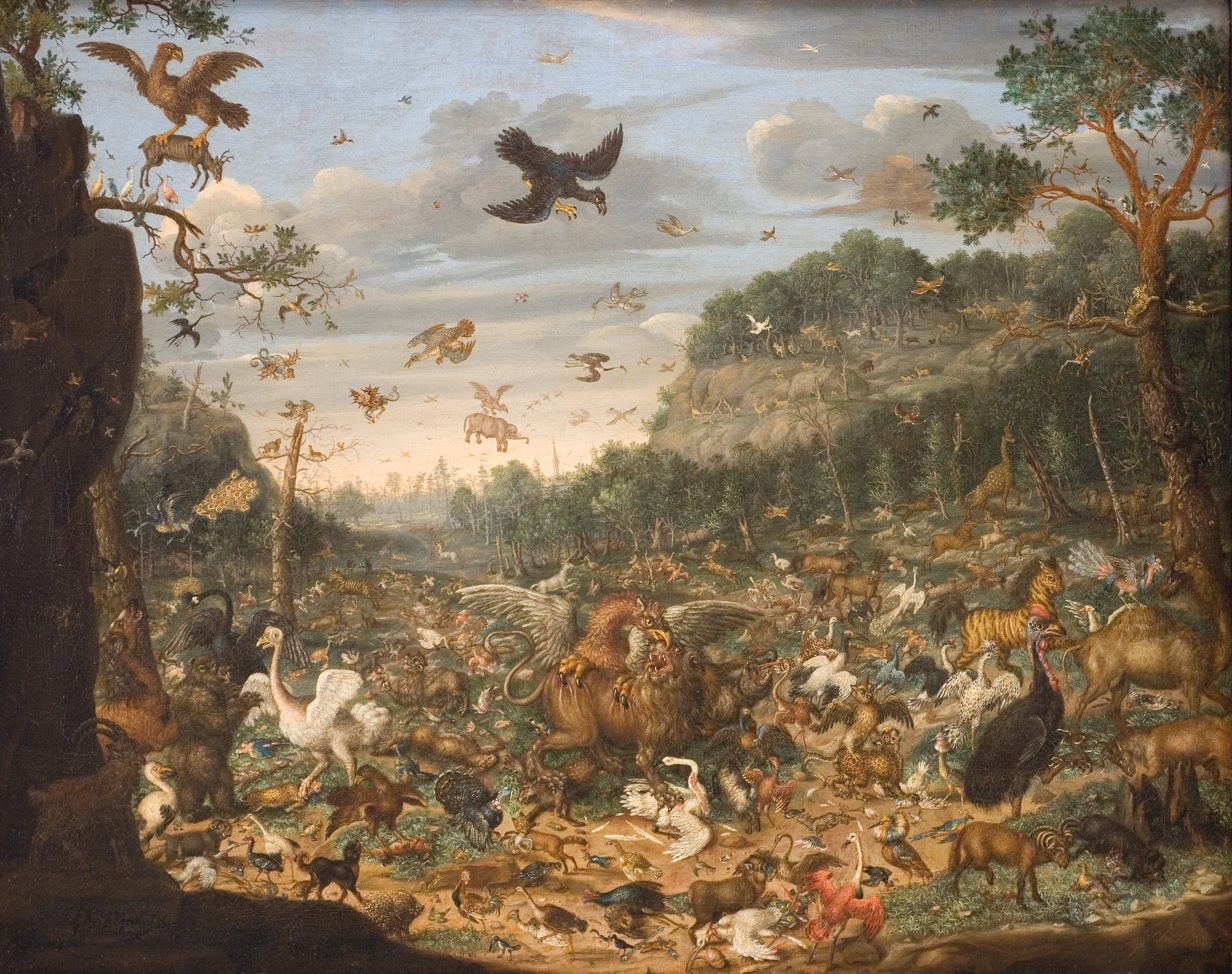
1690 painting by Franz Rösel von Rosenhof showing two roc-like birds carrying a deer and an elephant; a third grapples with a lion.

Polo claimed that the roc flew to Mogadishu "from the southern regions", and that the Great Khan sent messengers to the island who returned with a feather (likely the frond from a Raffia palm). He explicitly distinguishes the bird from the griffin.

In addition to Polo's account of the rukh in 1298, Chou Ch'ű-fei (周去非, Zhōu Qùfēi), in his 1178 book Lingwai Daida, told of a large island off Africa with birds large enough to use their quills as water reservoirs. Fronds of the raffia palm may have been brought to Kublai Khan under the guise of roc's feathers.

=== In folklore ===
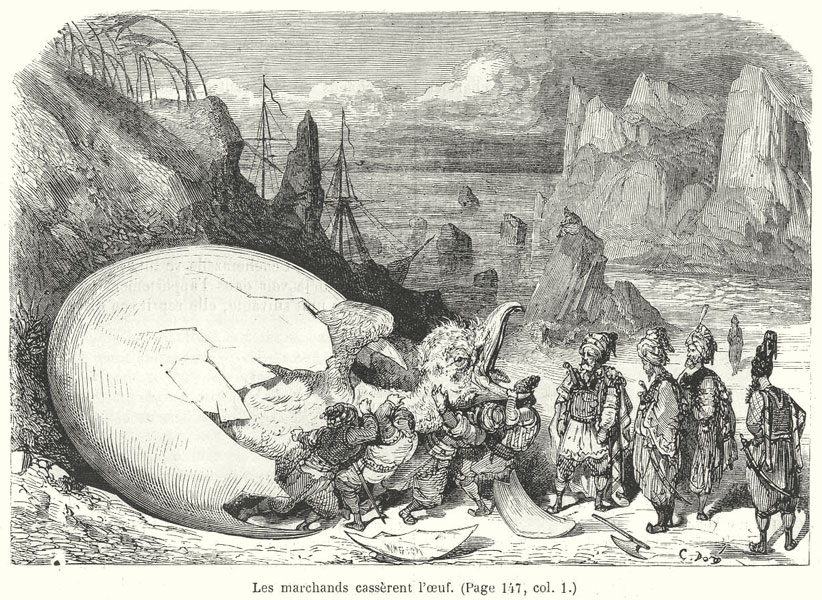
The merchants break the roc's egg, Le Magasin pitoresque, Paris, 1865

In The Arabian Nights the roc appears on a tropical island during Sinbad's second voyage. Because of Polo's account, others identified the island as Madagascar, which became the location for stories about other giant birds. In one of the four tales in which it was mentioned, Sinbad discovered an enormous dome with no entrance, 50 paces in circumference, and he realised it was an egg when he looked up to the heavens and saw the fabled roc, said to feed elephants to its young, blocking out the sun. When the bird settled on the egg Sinbad was trapped underneath, only to be carried off when the bird took flight the next morning, after he had secured himself to its feet with his turban.

Doubtless, it was Polo's description that inspired Antonio Pigafetta, one of Ferdinand Magellan's companions, who wrote or had ghost-written an embroidered account of the circumglobal voyage: in Pigafetta's account the home grounds of the roc were the seas of China. Such descriptions captured the imaginations of later illustrators, such as Stradanus c. 1590, or Theodor de Bry in 1594 who showed an elephant being carried off in the roc's talons, and depicting the roc destroying entire ships in revenge for destruction of its giant egg, as recounted in the fifth voyage of Sinbad the Sailor. Ulisse Aldrovandi's Ornithologia (1599) included a woodcut of a roc with a somewhat pig-like elephant in its talons.

=== Michael Drayton ===
Through the 16th century the existence of the roc could be accepted by Europeans. In 1604, Michael Drayton envisaged the rocs being taken aboard Noah's Ark:

All feathered things yet ever knowne to men,
From the huge Rucke, unto the little Wren;
From Forrest, Fields, from Rivers and from Pons,
All that have webs, or cloven-footed ones;
To the Grand Arke, together friendly came,
Whose severall species were too long to name.

=== Modern era ===
In the rational world of the 17th century, the roc was regarded more critically. The roc, like many other mythological and folkloric creatures, has entered the bestiaries of some fantasy role-playing games such as Dungeons & Dragons. The Scaled Composites Stratolaunch carries the nickname Roc; it is one of the largest aircraft ever built.

== Rationalization ==
The scientific culture of the 19th century introduced some "scientific" rationalizations for the myth's origins, by suggesting that the origin of the myth of the roc might lie in embellishments of the often-witnessed power of the eagle that could carry away a newborn lamb. In 1863, Bianconi suggested the roc was a raptor.

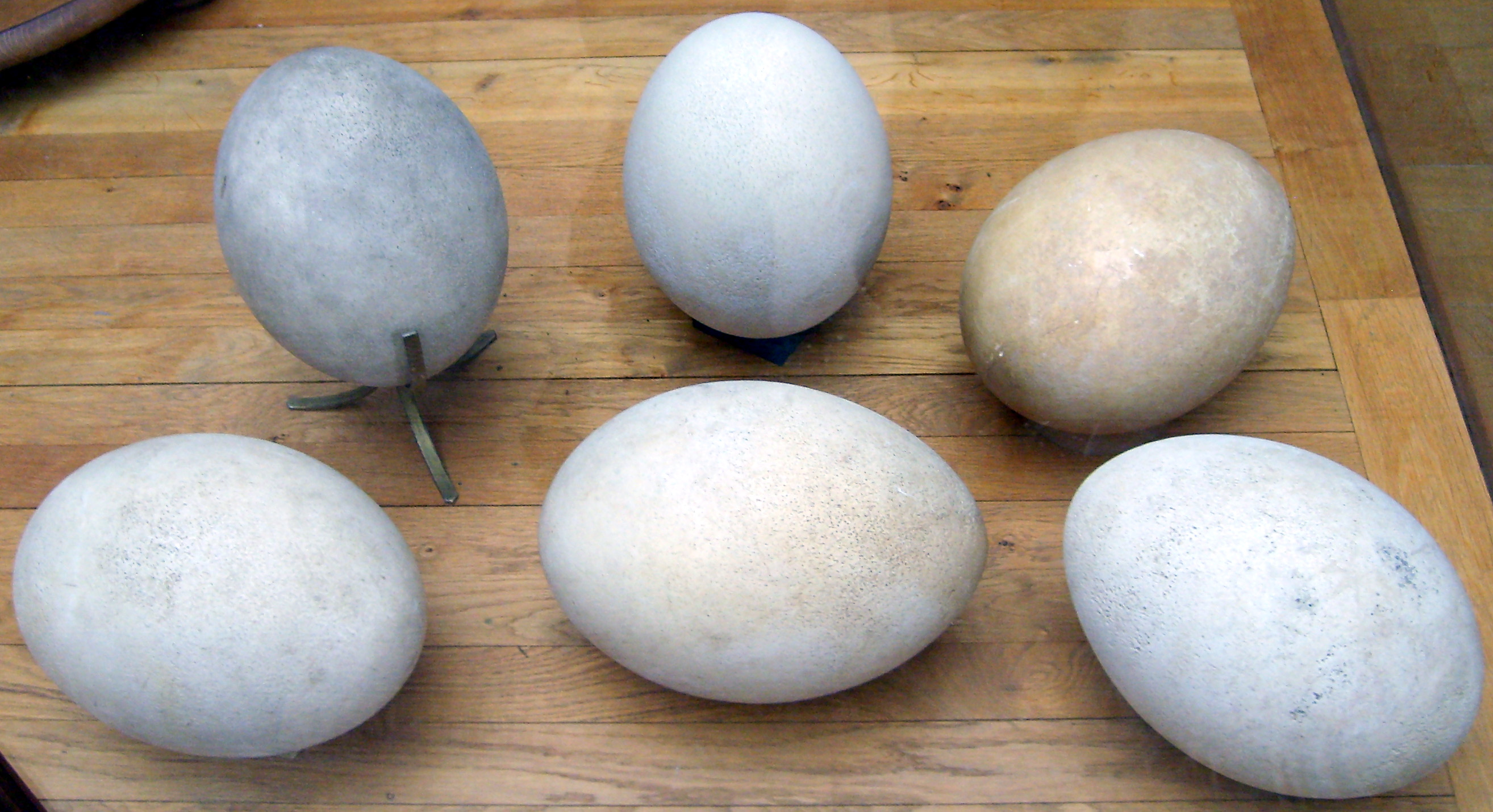
Aepyornis eggs, Muséum national d'Histoire naturelle, Paris

Another possible origin of the myth is accounts of eggs of another extinct Malagasy bird, the enormous Aepyornis elephant bird, hunted to extinction by the 16th century, that was three meters tall and flightless. There were reported elephant bird sightings at least in folklore memory as Étienne de Flacourt wrote in 1658. Its egg, live or subfossilised, was known as early as 1420, when sailors to the Cape of Good Hope found eggs of the roc, according to a caption in the 1456 Fra Mauro map of the world, which says that the roc "carries away an elephant or any other great animal". Between 1830 and 1840 European travelers in Madagascar saw giant eggs and egg shells. English observers were more willing to believe their accounts because they knew of the moa in New Zealand. In 1851 the French Academy of Sciences received three eggs. They and later fossils seemingly confirmed to 19th-century Europeans that Aepyornis was the roc, though elephant birds were ratites, and thus did not resemble the roc at all.

A giant subfossil eagle from Madagascar, the Malagasy crowned eagle (Stephanoaetus mahery), is thought to be the top avian predator of the island in prehistory, whose megafauna once included the aforementioned elephant birds, giant lemurs, and pygmy hippopotamuses.

== See also ==
- Ancient astronauts
- Cargo aircraft
- Aerial crane
- Outsize cargo
- Mount Qaf, the only place in this world where the roc will land
- Sinbad the Sailor
- Vogel Rok, a Rollercoaster themed to the myth in the Efteling
- Blackburn Roc, Second World War naval turret fighter
- List of fictional birds of prey
  - Pouākai, legendary giant bird of prey from New Zealand
  - Thunderbird, legendary giant bird of prey from North America
  - Eagle (Middle-earth), the giant birds of J. R. R. Tolkien's tales
- Rocs appear in the 2000 novel Baudolino by Umberto Eco
