= Rowing Pond =

Former rowing boat pond at Efteling

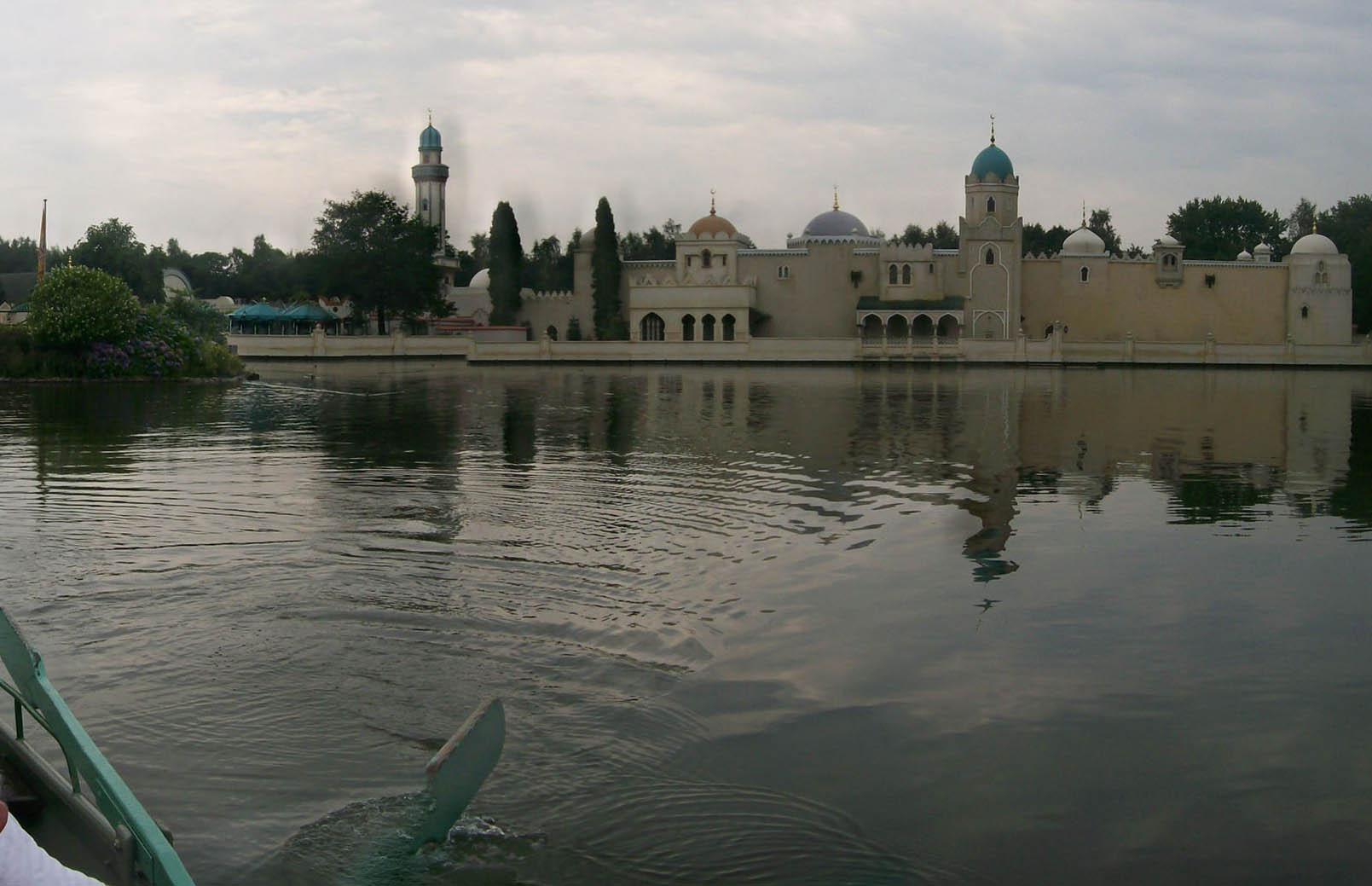
View from the rowing pond on the Fata Morgana

The Rowing Pond was a rowing boat pond in the amusement park Efteling in the Netherlands. When still operating, it was one of the oldest attractions in the park.

== History ==
Originally the rowing boats were located on a large artificial lake together with canoes. In 1976 the division between the rowing boats and canoes was replaced by a rope bridge. This rope bridge later became part of the decor of the Piraña. The Piraña was partly built on the rowing pond, so the boats had to be moved. The canoes were taken out of the park altogether with the coming of the Flying Dutchman. Later, the rowing boats were abolished as well. The sight now hosts the Aquanura water show.
