= The People of Laaf =

Attraction at Efteling

Efteling
- Coordinates: 51°39′11″N 5°02′56″E
- Opening date: 1990

The People of Laaf is an attraction in the amusement park Efteling in the Netherlands. It was designed by Ton van de Ven and opened its doors in 1990.

It is a small village, called “Lavelaer”, inhabited by the so-called “Laafs” ("Laven" in Dutch). The visitors can walk through the village and enter the houses, among which a bakery, a brewery, a windmill and a nursery and watch the Laafs do their normal daily activities. A monorail of 450 meters in length runs through the village at an altitude of about 3 meters. In the early years, riders had to pedal the monorail. This was discontinued because of the possibility of "crashing" into each other. Furthermore, if a rider stopped pedaling, the ride could be blocked for other visitors.

For the children there are slides and distorting mirrors.

Little statues of Laaf people engaged in various activities were for sale in the souvenir shops in Efteling, but also in several garden centres until 2004.

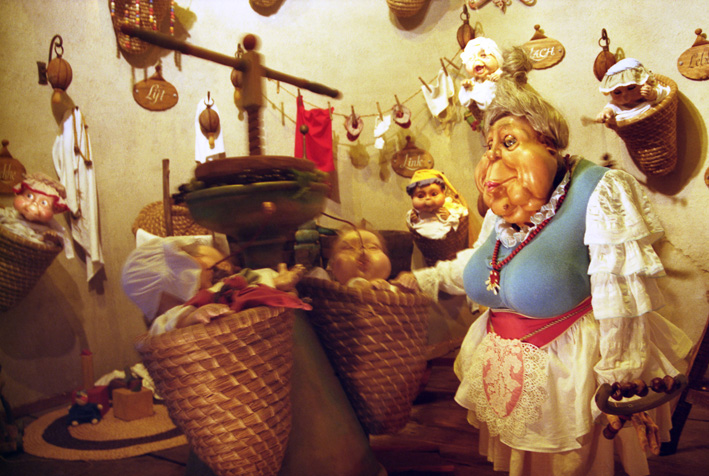
Lot's Kraamhuys

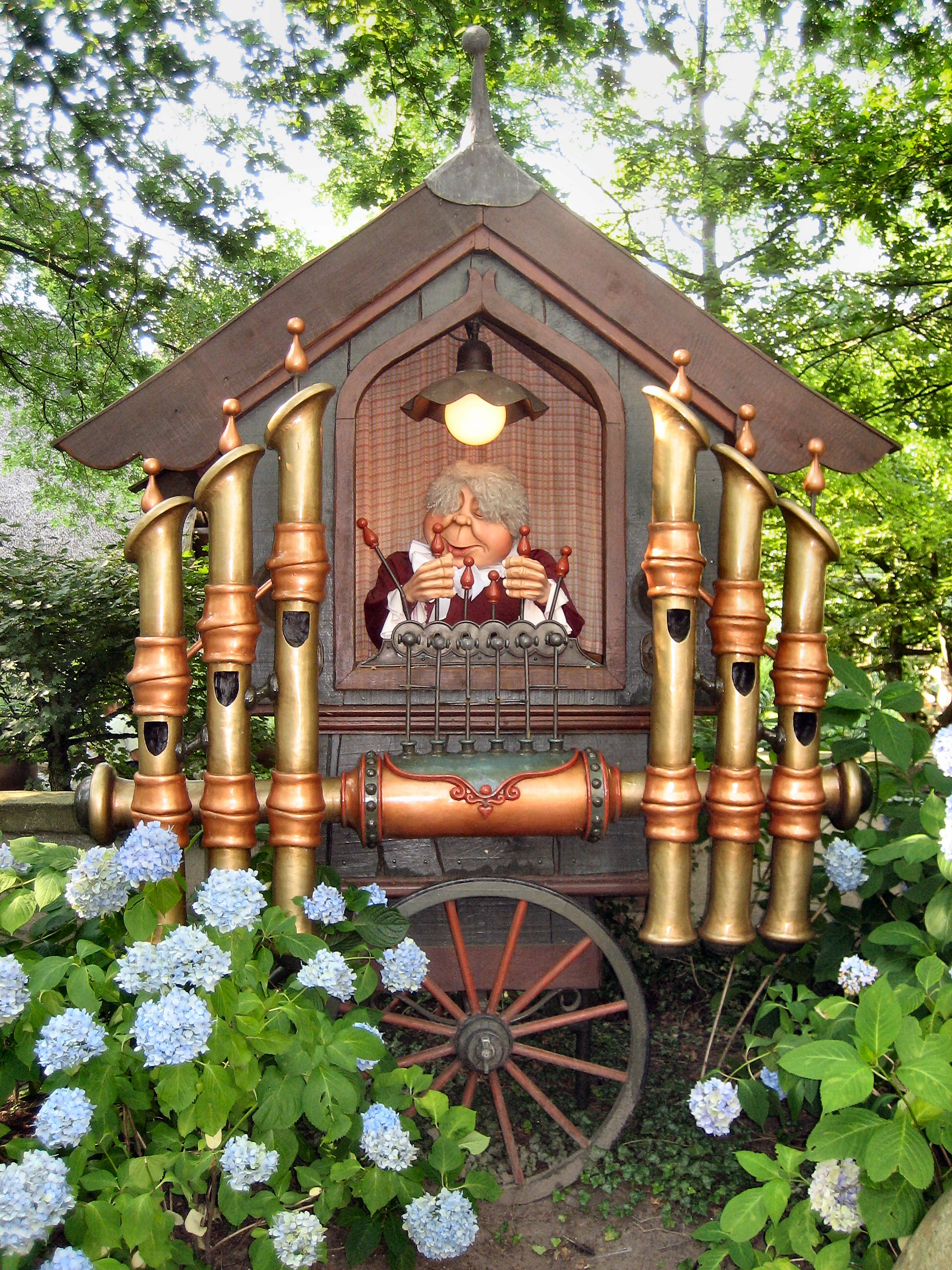
Organ in the Lavenlaar

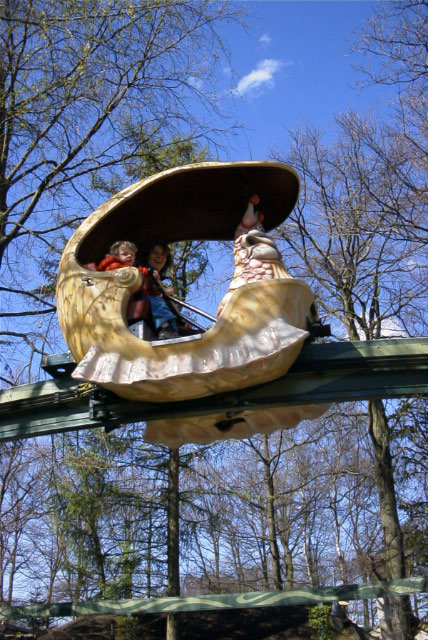
the Laaf - Monorail

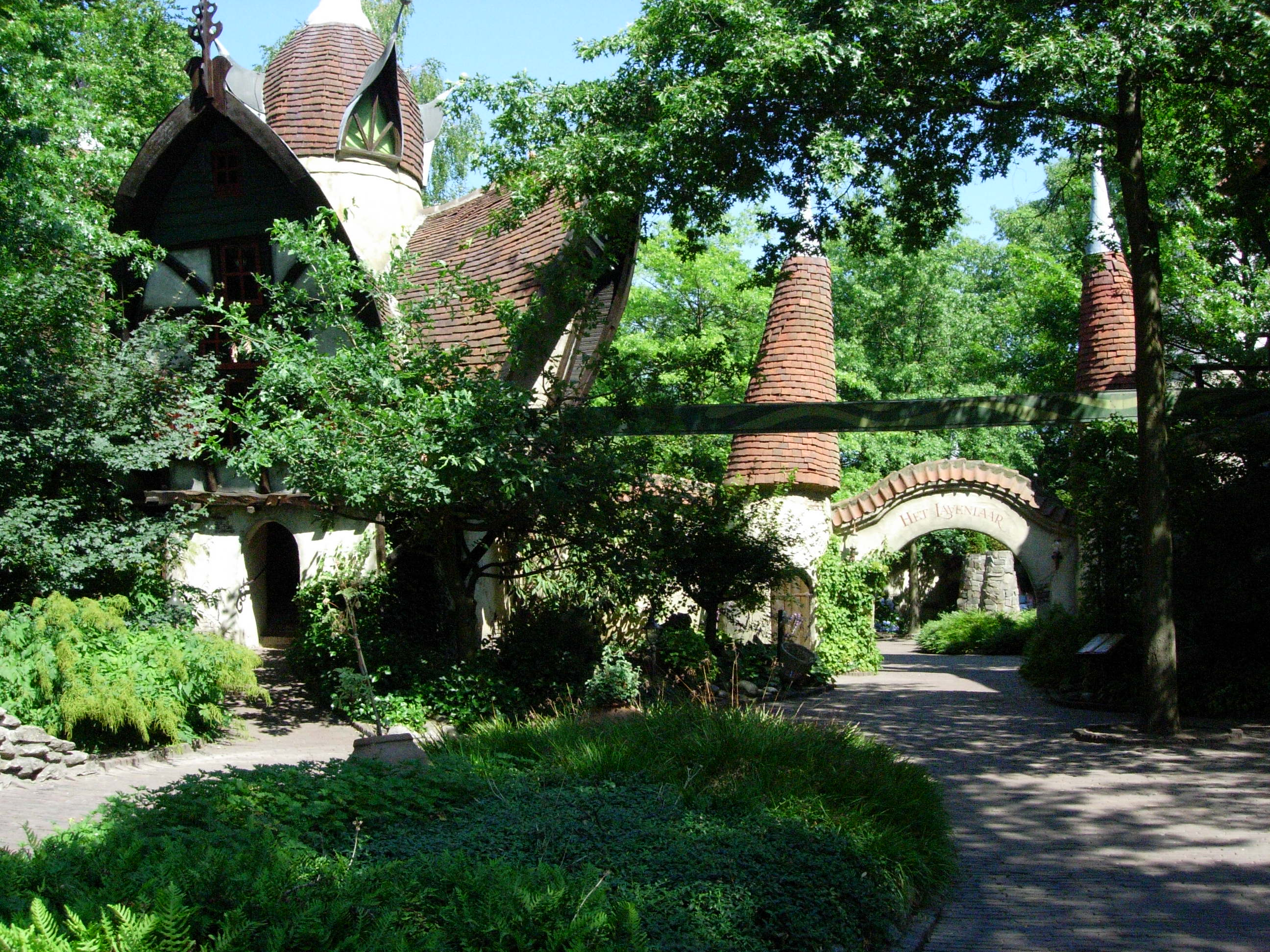
Main entrance of the village

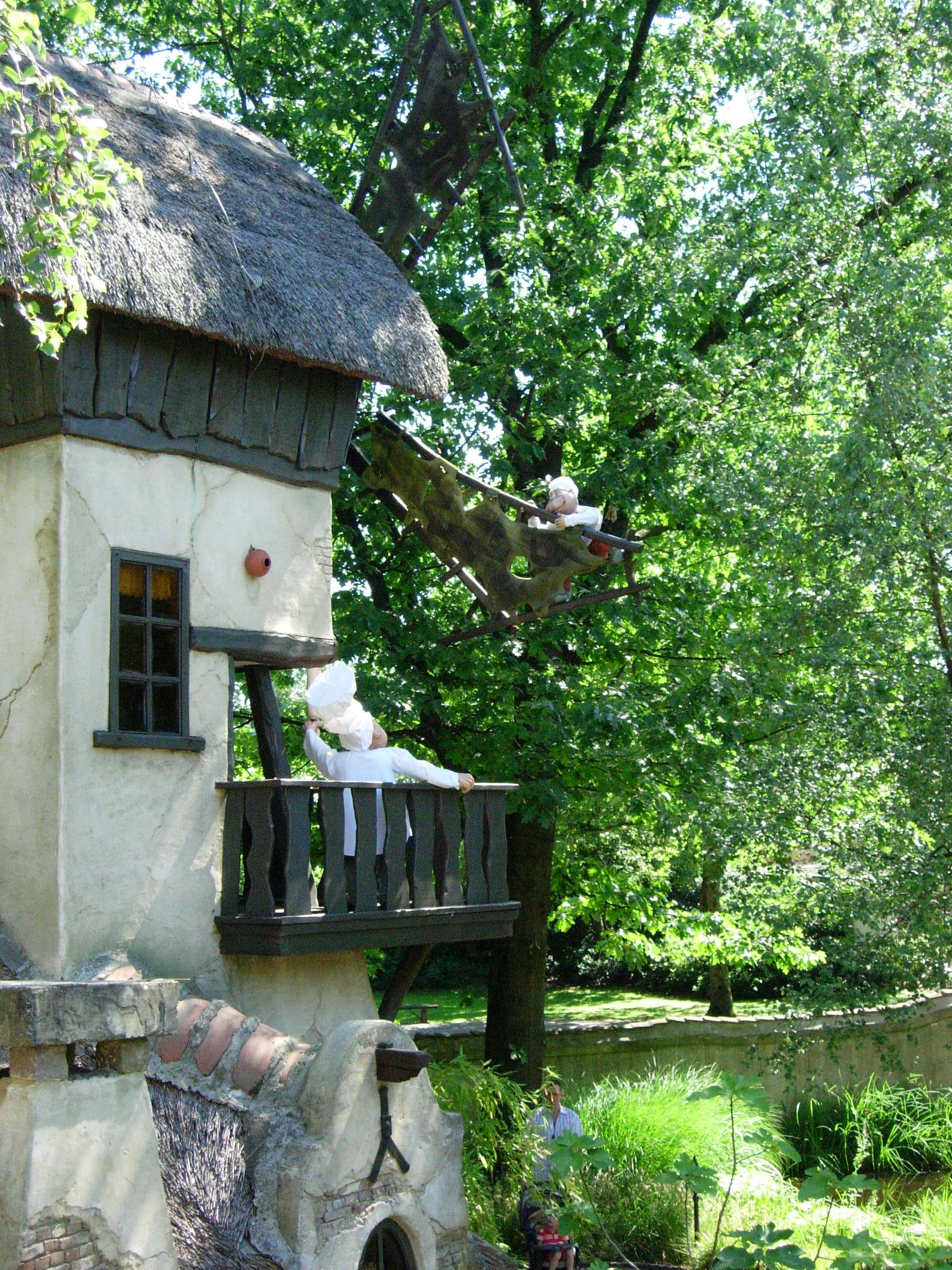
The mill

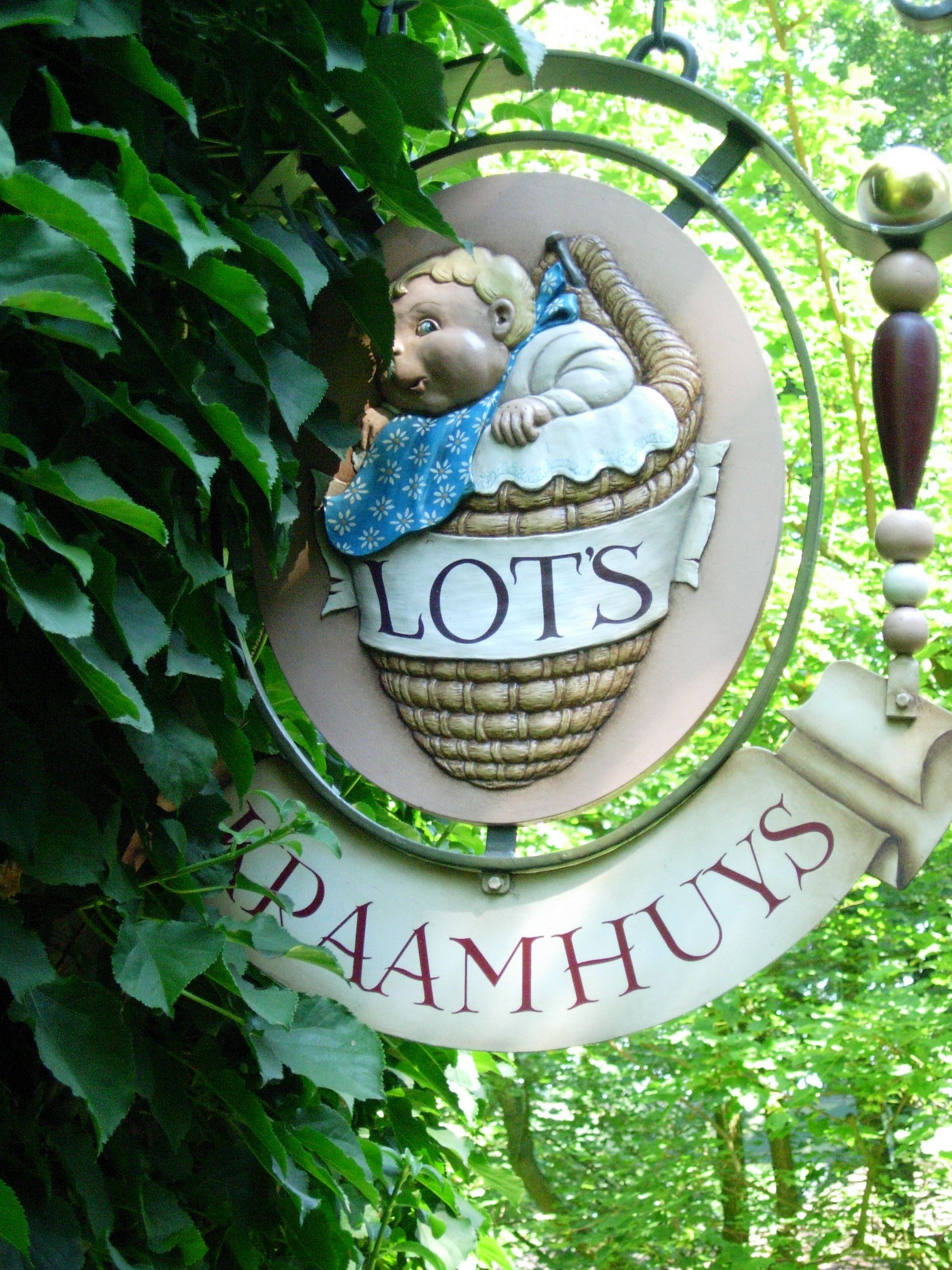
The nursery
