= Dreamflight =

Dark ride in Efteling

Coordinates: 51°39′09″N 5°02′46″E

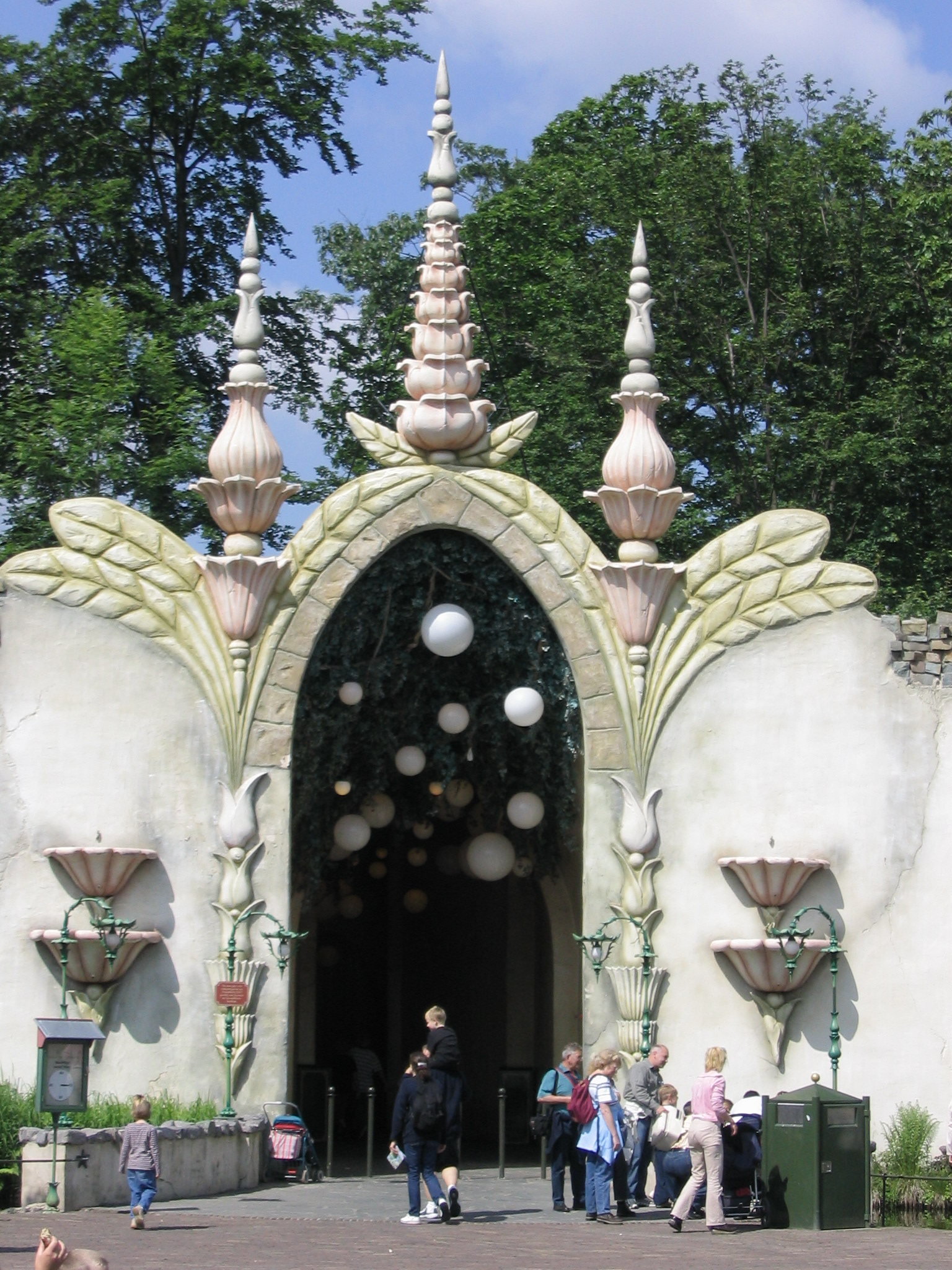
- Attraction entrance

Efteling
- Area: Marerijk
- Status: Operating
- Cost: €12.5 million
- Opening date: 1993

Ride statistics
- Attraction type: Suspended dark ride
- Manufacturer: Translift
- Designer: Ton van de Ven
- Music: Ruud Bos
- Height: 17 m (56 ft)
- Length: 425 m (1,394 ft)
- Speed: 20 km/h (12 mph)
- Capacity: 1800 riders per hour
- Duration: 6 minutes
- Height restriction: 100 cm (3 ft 3 in)

Droomvlucht ("Dreamflight" in English) is a dark ride in Efteling amusement park in the Netherlands. It was designed by Ton van de Ven, built by Translift and opened in 1993.

== History ==
In Droomvlucht, the visitors fly through a dream world of forests, castles, fairies, trolls and other fairy-tale-like creatures and scenes. The visitors are seated in small open cabins hanging from the ceiling. The ride takes them past five different scenes in about six minutes: the Castle Realm, the Wondrous Forest, the Fairy Garden, Heavenly Strongholds and the Squelch Forest.

The speed and height of the individual cabins vary throughout the ride, with a climax in the troll marshes at the end, where the cabins come to a seeming free-fall in a spiral downwards from 13 meters of height.

Efteling wanted to present Droomvlucht in 1992, for the 40-year anniversary of the park, which coincided with the opening of Disneyland Park (Paris). However, due to problems with the seating cabins it was not ready until 1993. Due to this problem, the ride cost €4.5 million more than was estimated, bringing the total costs up to €12.5 million.

== The ride ==
Castle Realm

Wondrous Forest

Fairy Garden

Heavenly Strongholds

Squelch Forest

Due to the ride's popularity, the original entry was moved from the thematic hall to a standard queue line. The original entry hall is still in use for special events. The ride starts with some animatronics. Integration between the scenes consists of scarcely lit tunnels with ambient music. The ride contains 48 fairies, 10 trolls, 38 animals, 1 million flowers, 1.5 million plants and 3.8 million leaves.

- The Castle Realm

The dream begins upon entering the Castle Realm. Four lighted castles float against the evening glow. The hazy realm also has a waterfall and a smell of moist vegetation.

- The Wondrous Forest

The forest is filled with fairies and creatures that look like fauns, but because of the lack of goat-like legs they appear to be satyrs. Another one is a troll-like creature, the Squelch, here playing a harp. Behind a magic fairy a satyr can be seen bathing in the nude, and above him is a unicorn.

- The Fairy Garden

In this garden fairies can be seen paddling and swinging, while others watch the visitor from branches on all sides. A deer is quenching her thirst. The troll king Oberon is waving the guests out, into a long tunnel with stars.

- Heavenly Strongholds

In this scene there are several moons and strongholds circling each other against a starlit sky. The moons are urbanized with magical cities. Several giant lighted strongholds are floating in the latter part of the scene.

- Squelch Forest

The last scene spirals 13 meters down into a rain forest, populated by trolls and squelches who are enjoying themselves in the rain. A troll comes at the car when at ground level. Some elves, trolls and squelches conclude the ride.

== Music ==
The music for Dreamflight – for each scene a different theme - was composed by Ruud Bos, who also wrote the musical themes for (among other attractions) Fata Morgana, Vogel Rok and Villa Volta.
