= Vogel Rok =

Enclosed roller coaster at Efteling

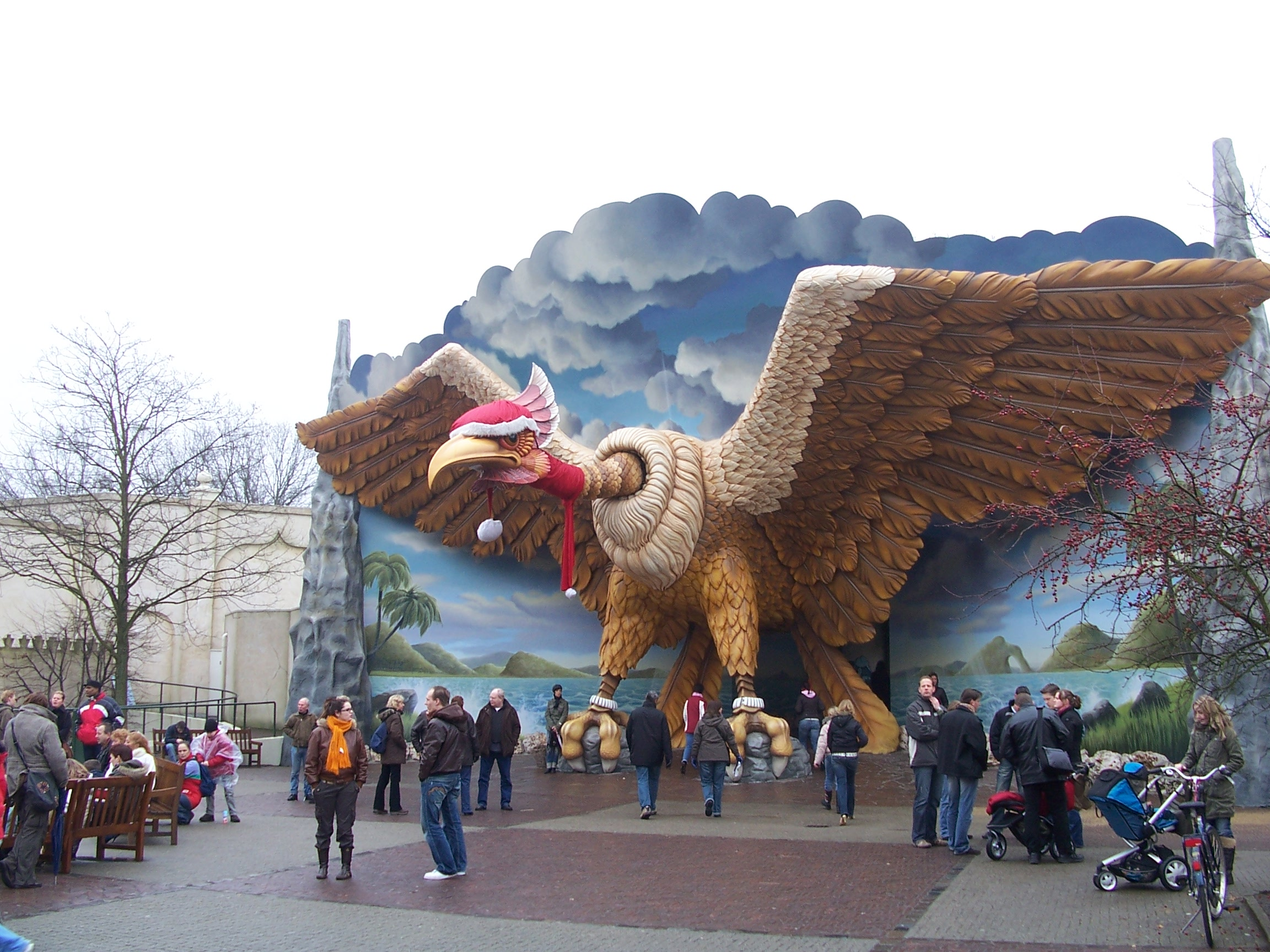

Efteling
- Location: Efteling
- Park section: Reizenrijk
- Coordinates: 51°39′08″N 5°03′09″E
- Status: Operating
- Opening date: April 9, 1998
- Cost: € 12 million

General statistics
- Type: Steel – Enclosed
- Manufacturer: Vekoma
- Designer: Ton van de Ven
- Model: Custom MK-900
- Lift/launch system: tyre-driven lift-hill
- Height: 82 ft (25 m)
- Drop: 62 ft (19 m)
- Length: 2,296 ft (700 m)
- Speed: 40 mph (64 km/h)
- Inversions: 0
- Duration: 1:41
- Capacity: 1600 riders per hour
- G-force: 3.5
- Height restriction: 47.3 in (120 cm)
- Vogel Rok at RCDB

Vogel Rok ("Bird Roc" in English) is an enclosed roller coaster in the Efteling amusement park in the Netherlands.

== History and details ==
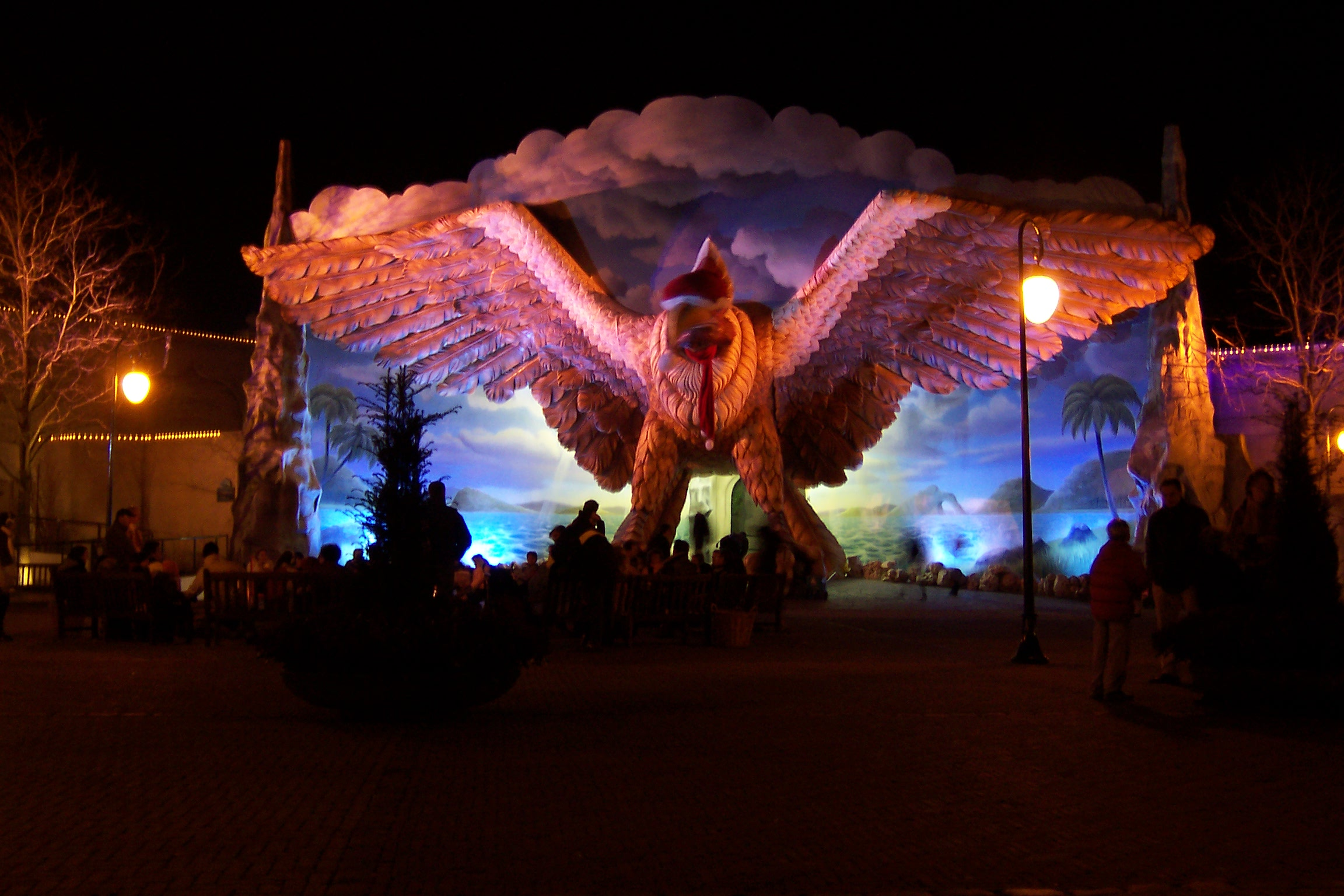
At night

The name of the ride, Vogel Rok, refers to the adventure of Sinbad and the Bird Roc from the 1001 Arabian Nights; the extensive theming covers, beside the ride, the building and the queue line. The building has as a frontage a giant colorful Roc, the largest bird in Europe, according to the Guinness Book of Records. In the opening year there weren’t many effects in the ride, and the link between the story and the ride wasn’t clear. Since then a Serpent’s mouth has been added at the end of the ride, which lights up as the train goes through it. There used to be a laser-light-show at the queue, but that has been removed. This was done as the lights were too low, thereby damaging people’s eyes. A new queue line was constructed in 2007, Replacing the old queue line, More themed decorations were also added.

Vogel Rok used to operate with three trains. Problems with the brakes in 2015 forced the ride to operate with two trains only. This issue was solved as part of a renovation in 2018.

In December 2024, the Efteling theme park celebrated the one-millionth ride of Vogel Rok. To mark the occasion, the park distributed commemorative certificates to visitors who took part in the milestone ride. The certificates, designed with the attraction’s logo and imagery, included the phrases “Ik was bij de miljoenste rit” (“I was part of the millionth ride”) and “Je hebt de vlucht in de duisternis doorstaan!” (“You have survived the flight in the darkness!”). According to the park, the record was achieved by the attraction’s third train, while the other two trains were also approaching the same milestone (999.500 for train 1, 964.000 for train 2). With all three combined, Vogel Rok had completed around three million rides since its opening.

== The ride ==
Lasers project over the train as it climbs the lift-hill and seen to the left are four Rocs flying off. In a strong curve down leftwards the train dives towards the ground and several more curves bring the train through a tunnel of lasers.
The train then falls into a helix and goes through a Serpent’s mouth, which lights up as the train passes through it. The last curve is decorated with fiber optic lights, portraying the diamond treasure.
Apparent wind-effects stimulate the ride-experience.

The ride has an onboard sound system with a synchronized soundtrack written by composer Ruud Bos, who also wrote the musical themes for Droomvlucht, Fata Morgana and Villa Volta.
