= Tin Lizzies =

Car ride at Efteling

Coordinates: 51.6489°N 5.0539°E

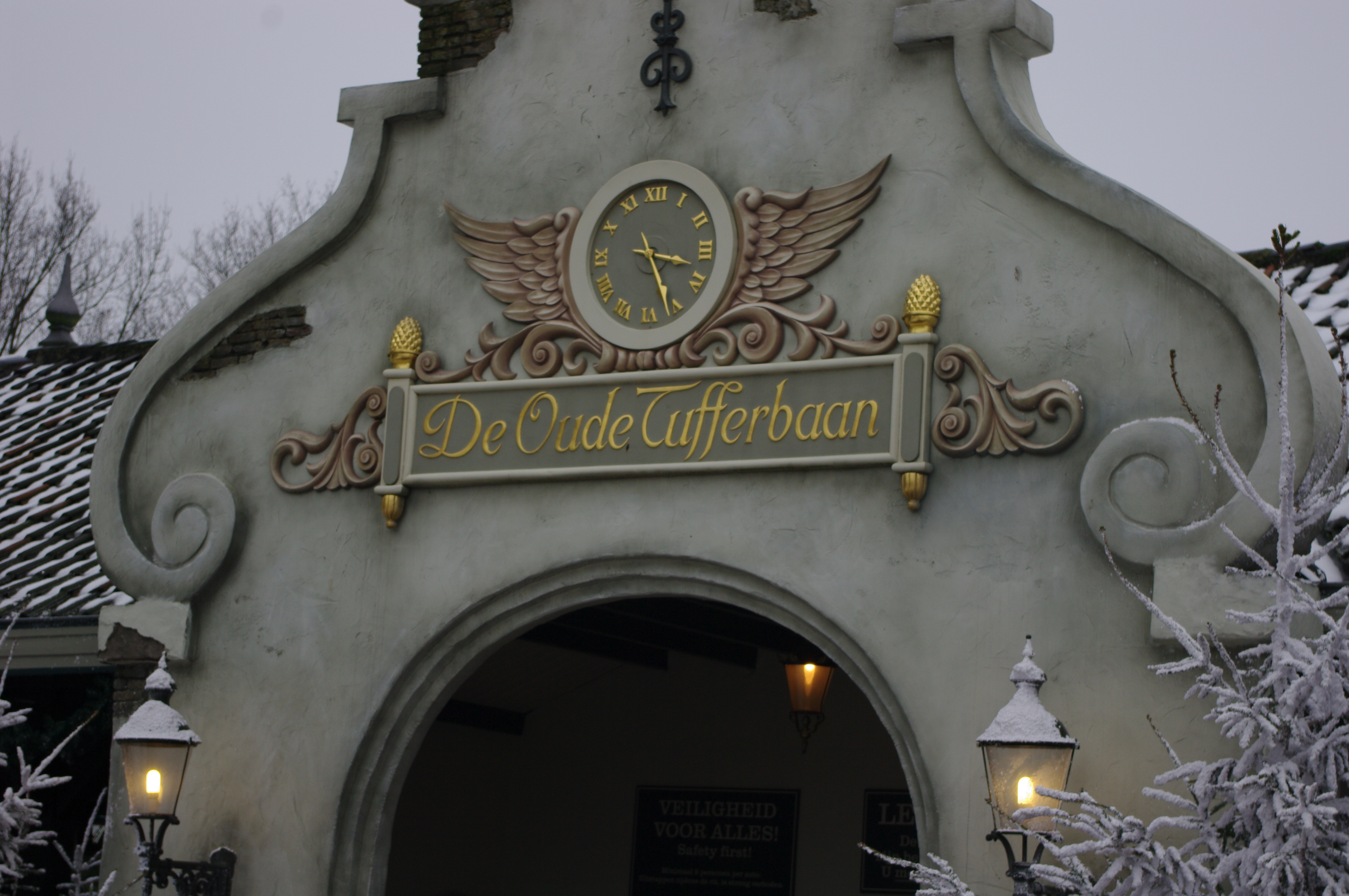
- Ride entrance

Efteling
- Status: Operating
- Opening date: 1984

Ride statistics
- Attraction type: Vintage car ride
- Manufacturer: Mack Rides
- Designer: Joop Geesink
- Length: 590 m (1,940 ft)
- Capacity: 1,200 riders per hour
- Vehicle type: Ford Model T
- Vehicles: 17
- Riders per vehicle: 4
- Duration: 6 minutes

Tin Lizzies (or Old-timers; "De Oude Tuffer" in Dutch) is a car ride in the amusement park Efteling in the Netherlands. The attraction was designed by Joop Geesink and built by Mack Rides, and started operating in 1984.

== History and details ==
In this junior ride passengers take place in a Ford Model T that are guided over a metal rail which is mounted in the ground. There is some need for steering to make the ride as smooth as possible, while passing a creek, trees and flower beds.

The ride is based on the Whip by William F. Mangels.

Speed: 6.5 km/h
Ride length: 590 m in 6 min.
Number of Flivvers: 17 (capacity of 4)
Ride capacity: 1200 passengers per hour
