= Fata Morgana (Efteling) =

Dark ride in Efteling, Netherlands

Coordinates: 51°38′49″N 5°02′44″E

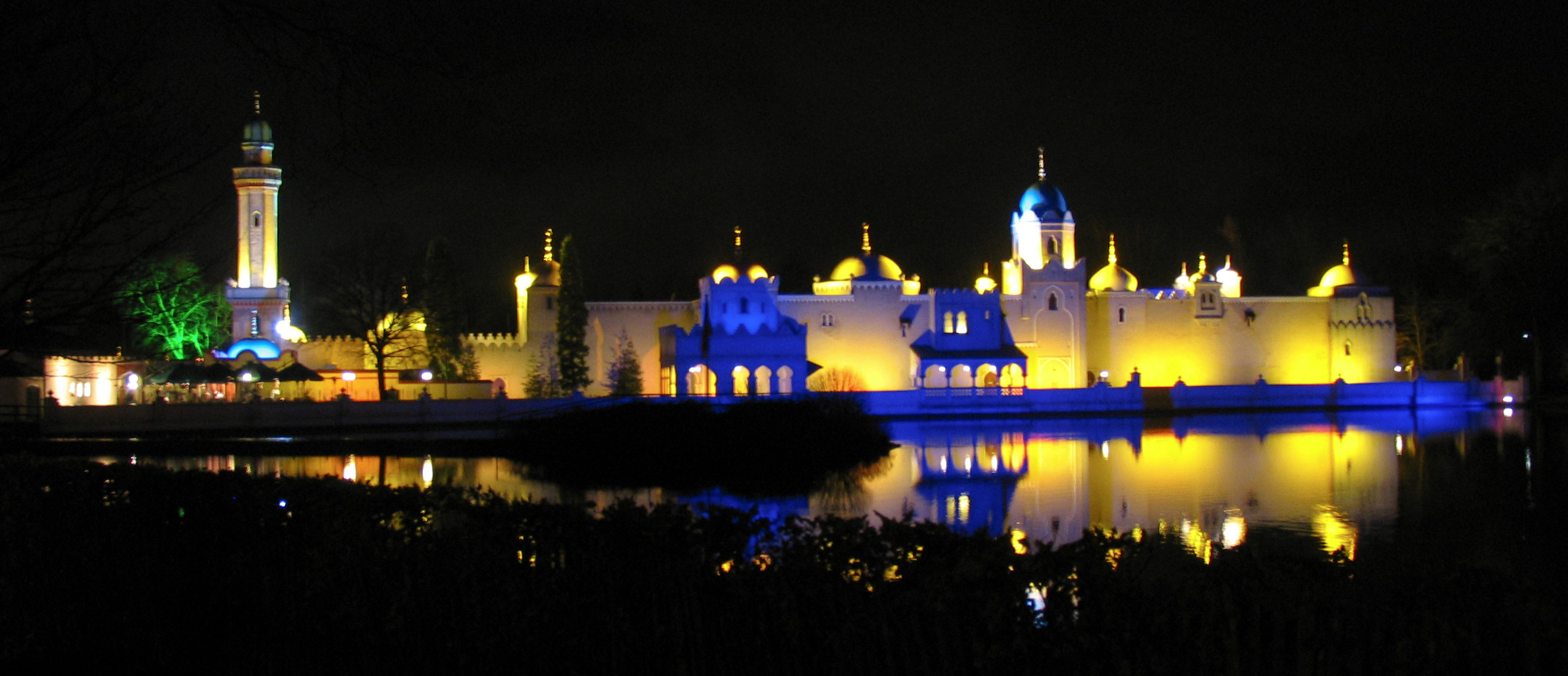
- Fata Morgana at night

Efteling
- Area: Anderrijk
- Status: Operating
- Cost: €7,000,000
- Opening date: 1986

General statistics
- Type: Dark ride
- Manufacturer: Intamin
- Designer: Ton van de Ven, Jan Verhoeven
- Model: Tow boat ride
- Speed: 2 km/h (1.2 mph)
- Capacity: 1800 riders per hour
- Duration: 8 minutes

Fata Morgana, the forbidden city, also known as 1001 Arabian Nights (or "1001 nachten" in Dutch) is a dark ride in the amusement park Efteling in the Netherlands. The attraction was designed by Ton van de Ven and Jan Verhoeven and opened in 1986.

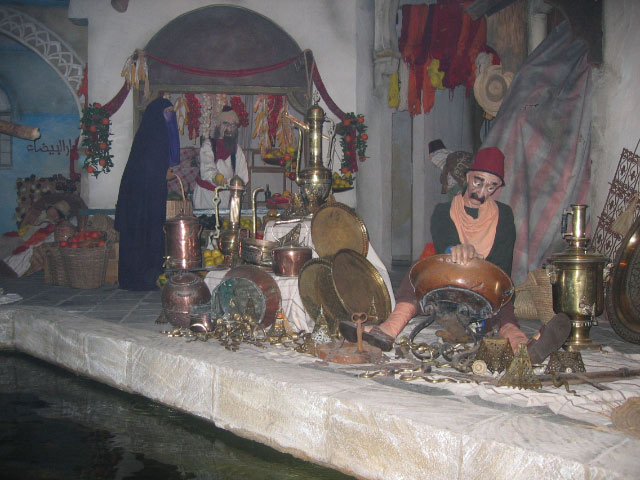
Market scene

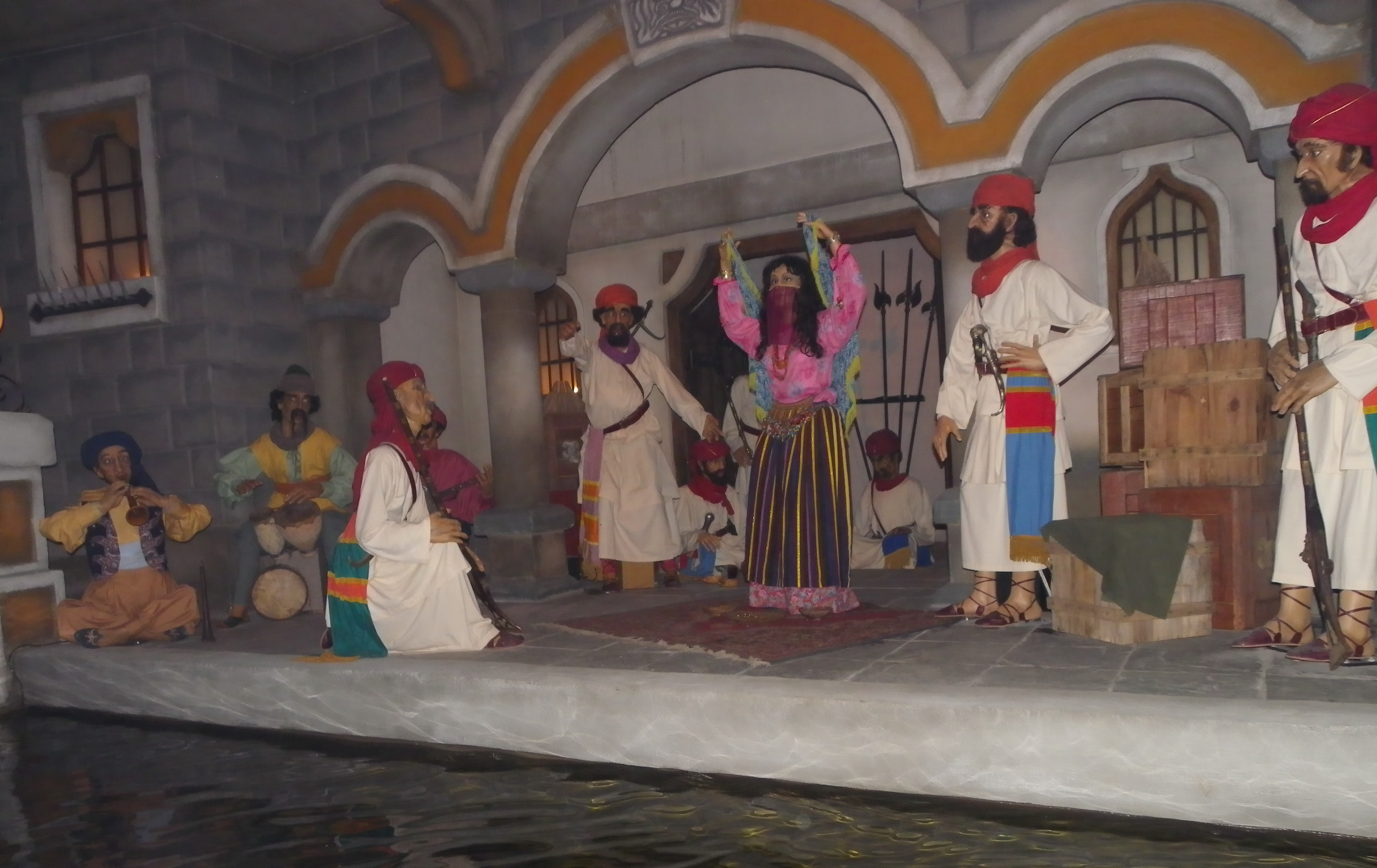
Belly dancing

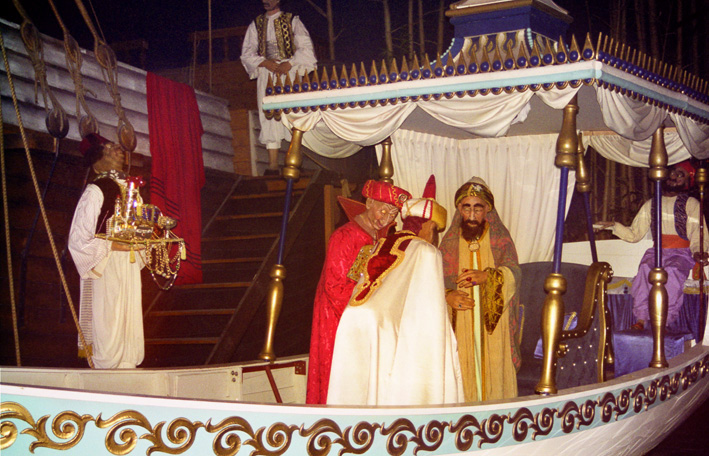
Harbor scene

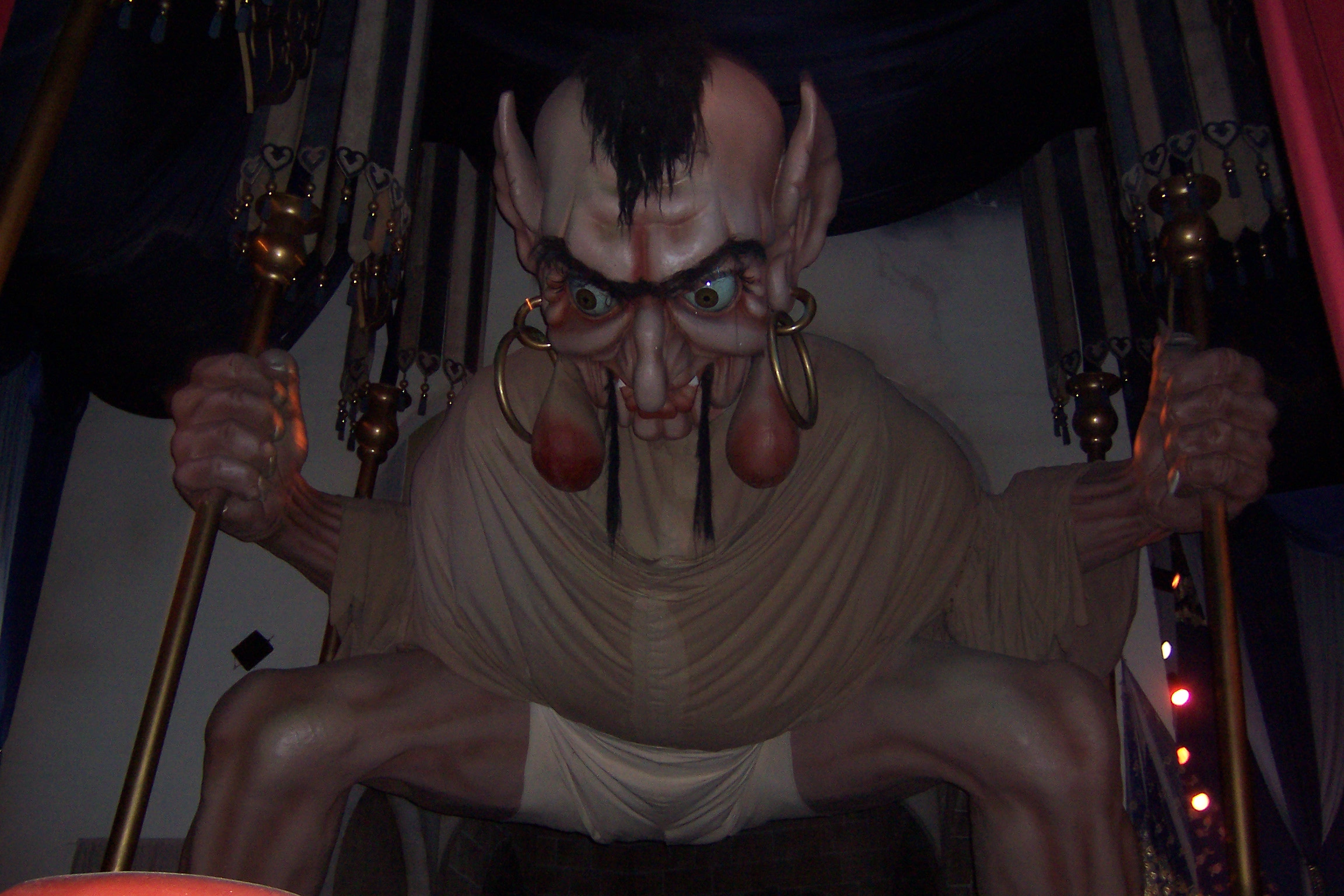
The Jinn

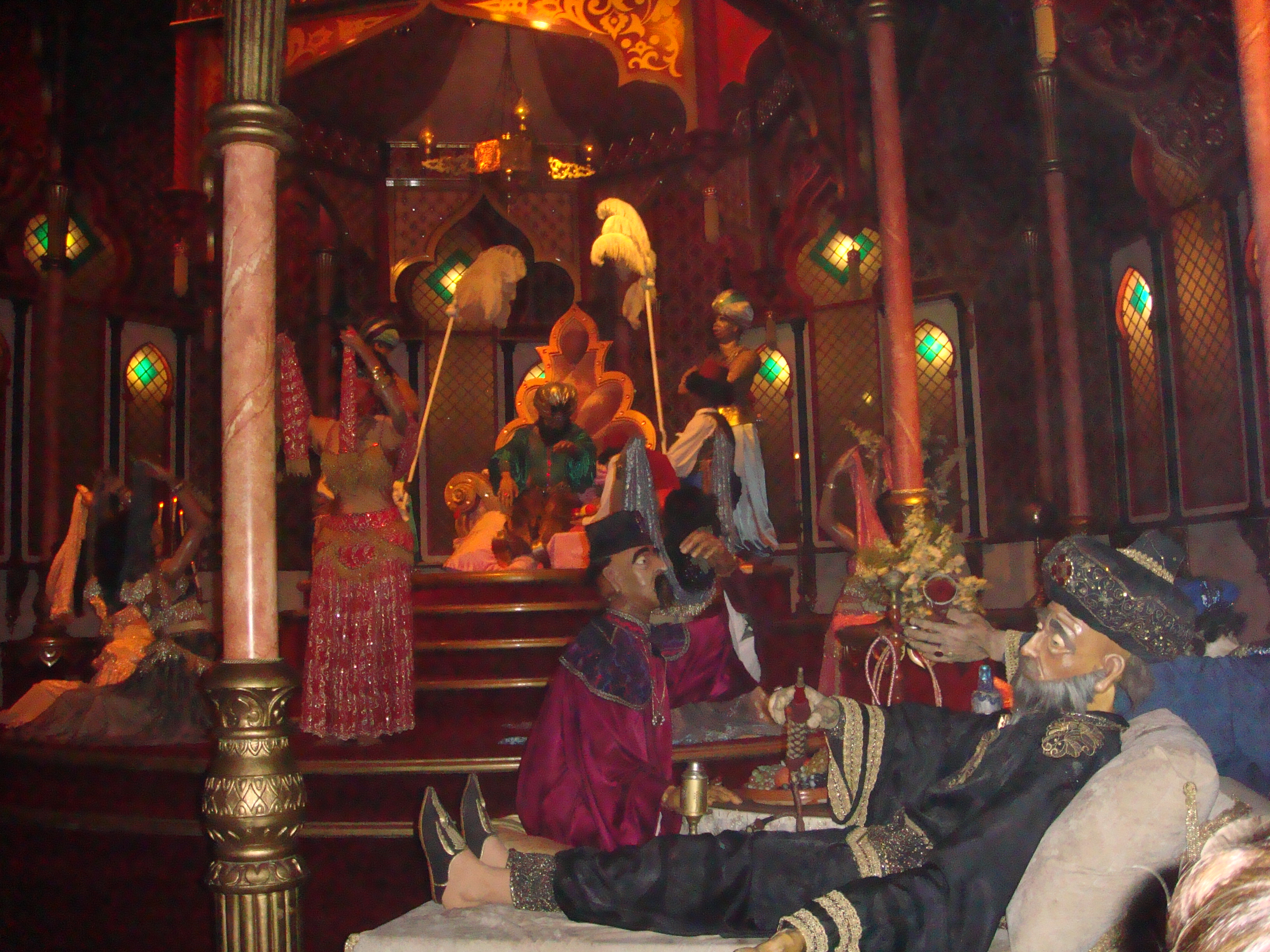
Throne room

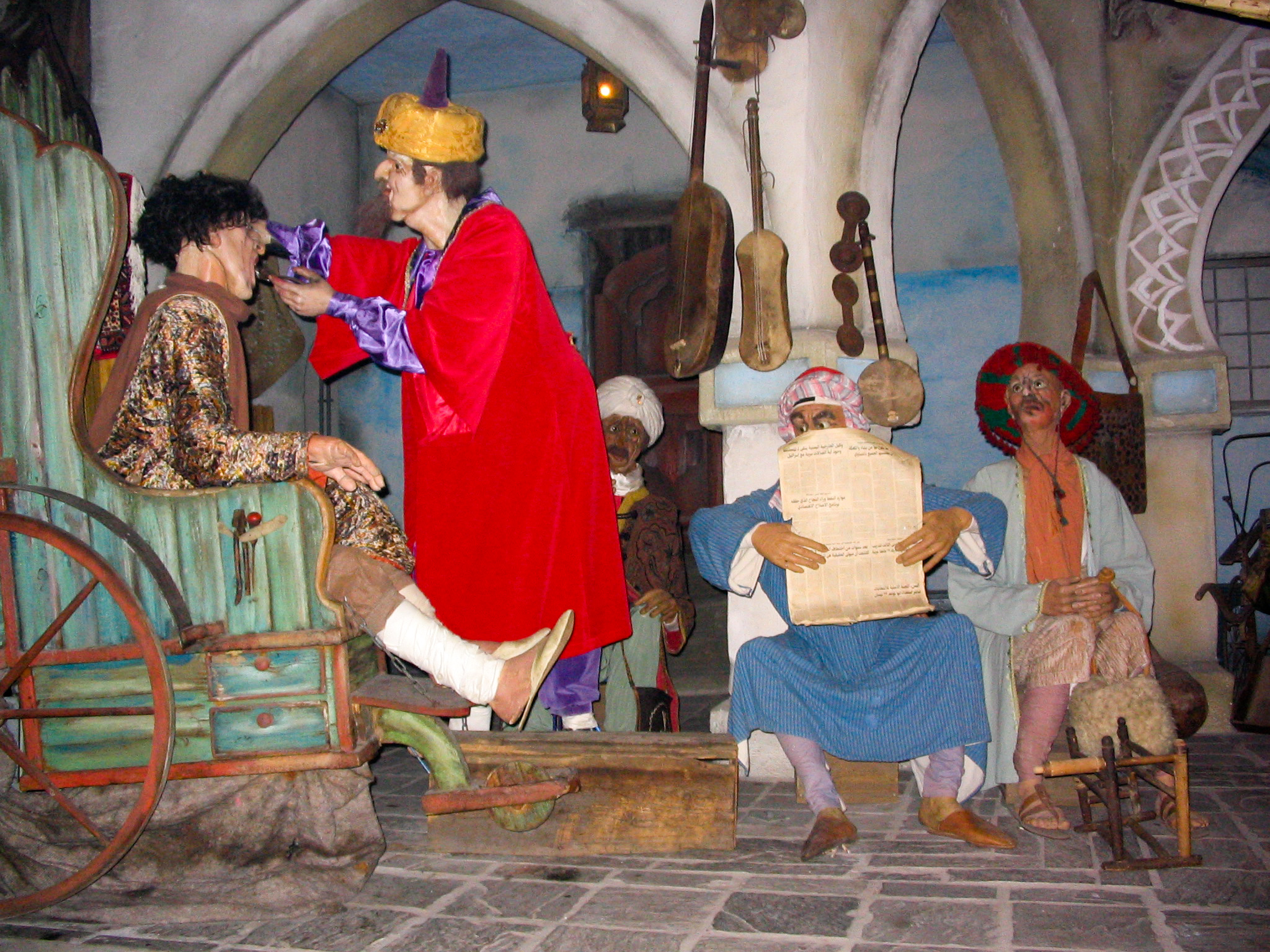
Another market scene

== Features ==
A schematic of the cam system that controls the looping motions of the animatronics.

Fata Morgana is a dark ride/tow boat ride that was opened in 1986. The attraction is based on the 1001 Arabian Nights. The ride is populated by 140 animatronics. Fata Morgana is set inside a large building with turquoise and gold domes on the roof. A large tower serves as the entrance to the ride. There is a large square outside the ride with palm trees, fountains and flames. The ride's gift shop De Bazaar, and a kiosk, Oase, are located nearby to the ride.

== Boarding ==
The facade of the ride is a huge domed building painted gold and turquoise. Guests enter through a large tower that serves as the entrance to the ride. They then wait on raised platforms above a round canal with a turntable in the middle. Guests are taken down the stairs and onto the omnimover style turntable, before boarding 16 passenger boats. There is never more than one boat in each scene, except for the first Jungle scene where one can see the back of a boat turning into the Poor District.

== Ride ==
The ride is divided into fourteen scenes, comprising a journey through an Arabian city and its surroundings in the evening, including:

- Jungle
- Poor District
- Marketplace
- Prison
- Torture Chamber
- Harbour
- Harem
- The Pasha's Palace
- Treasure Chamber
- Storm Scene
- Jungle

Total ride time is 8 minutes, capacity of 1800 persons/ hour.

An on-ride photo is taken part way through.

== History and details ==
The attraction is considered to be the link between the old fairy-tale style of Anton Pieck and the newer, more intensive rides.

The opening was planned for 1984, but in order to give more time for the designing team it was postponed to 1986. The original name Fata Medina was changed to Fata Morgana to avoid confusion with the Islamic holy city, though it is more likely that it was a reference to the first completed part of the ride, the Medina quarter- the poor district and central marketplace.

The decorative art was bought in the Moroccan city of Marrakesh and the animatronics were dressed by Belgian designer Jeanine Lambrechts.

Underwater rotating disks regulate the transport system provided by the Swiss manufacturer Intamin. The whole transport system was developed by Intamin (as a Tow boat ride).

Total cost, converted from Guilders: €7 million.

== Music ==
The music for Fata Morgana was composed by composer Ruud Bos, who also wrote the musical themes for Dreamflight, Bird Rok and Villa Volta.

Naturally he chose a Harem style as the base theme for the music. More specifically, the beginning of the ride is linked by orchestral music to the dreamy, mideastern music with flutes and violins of the market, the first setting of the attraction. The music gets darker when the ride passes the prison part. A slow melody sets in upon entering the harbor but is extended with instruments like violins, gongs and a percussion. The musical climax comes when the ride ends in the final scene of the throneroom.

There are five compositions:

- The Harem
- The Harbor
- The Market Place
- The Eastern Jails
- The Jungle

30 amplifiers and 150 loudspeakers generate a total of 8000 Watt.
