= Villa Volta =

Attraction at Efteling amusement park

Coordinates: 51°39′11″N 5°02′51″E

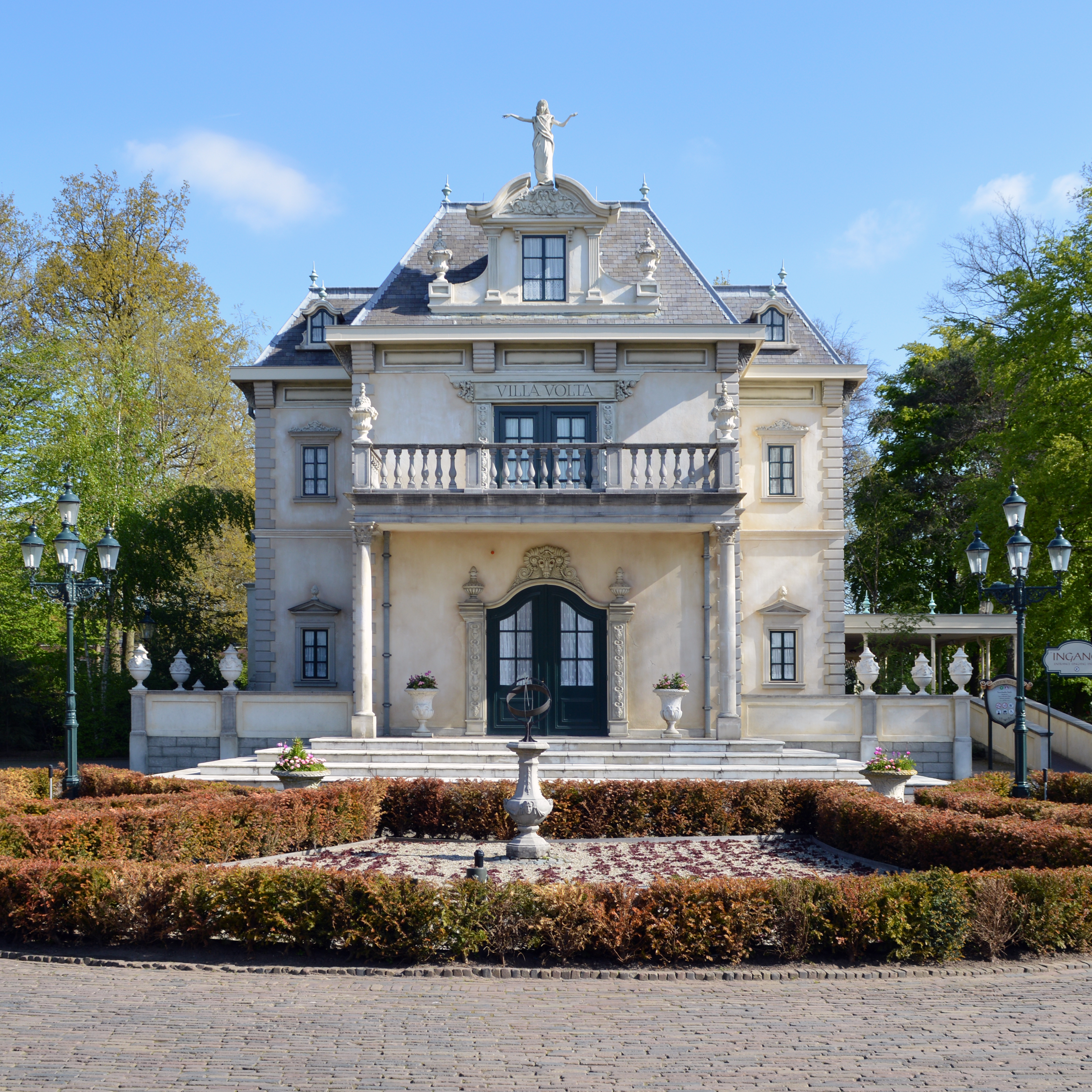
- Ride exterior

Efteling
- Area: Marerijk
- Status: Operating
- Cost: ƒ9,600,000
- Opening date: 4 April 1996

Ride statistics
- Attraction type: Madhouse
- Manufacturer: Vekoma
- Designer: Ton van de Ven
- Theme: Buckriders
- Music: Ruud Bos
- Participants per group: 78
- Duration: 10 minutes

Villa Volta is an attraction in the amusement park Efteling in the Netherlands. It is a rare type of ride known as a madhouse, a variation of a haunted house, where the visitors get the illusion that either the building, the visitors themselves or both are turned upside down. It was designed by Ton van de Ven and was built by Vekoma in 1996.

== Characteristics ==
When entering the house, there are two small waiting areas where a story is told about the house getting cursed, turning it upside down ever since. The story of Villa Volta is based on the legend of the buckriders, a fierce and merciless gang of robbers that was active in the Kempen in the Dutch provinces of North Brabant (where The Efteling is located) and Limburg and the bordering Belgian provinces of Brabant and Limburg. It was told that they had made a pact with the devil and flew through the sky on the backs of goats. They would mark the doors of the farms and houses where they would come and rob the place to warn the inhabitants.

Villa Volta is supposed to be the home of the leader of the goat riders, Hugo van den Loonsche Duynen, who inhabits the second waiting room as an animatronic. The house and Hugo were cursed by a mysterious woman after robbing the Abbey of Postel. She can be seen on top of the house swinging her arms on the wind. The woman tells Hugo:

“Nowhere in your house, nor in any other place in the world, will you find peace. Only when a noble person with the clear conscience like that of a newborn child enters your house will you find peace in your home and in your heart.”

== Ride mechanics ==
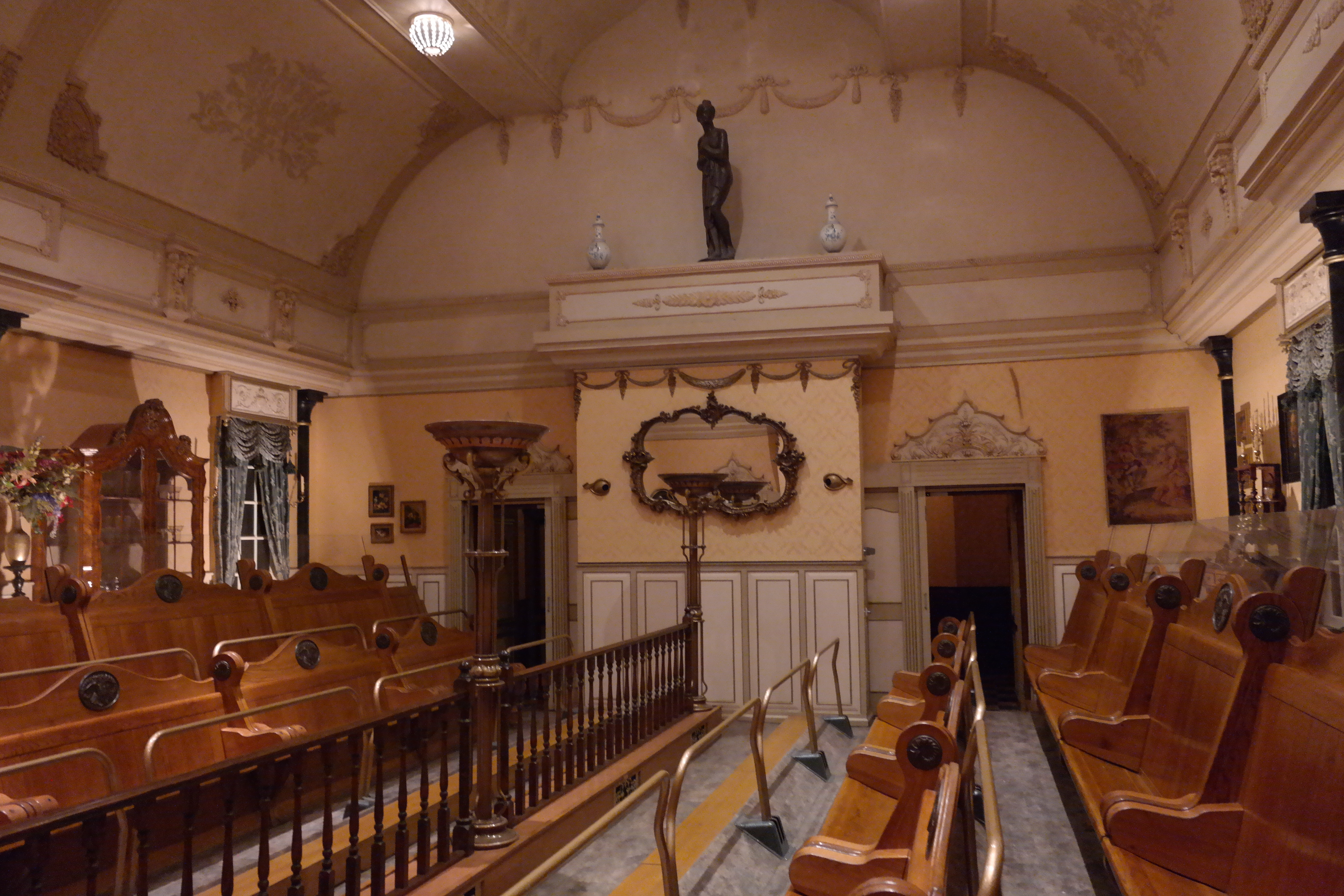
Inside the ride

Although Villa Volta is the first large-scale project of this concept, the technique has been known since early 20th century. The benches where the visitors are seated are placed on a swing that swings with a maximum angle of 30 degrees. The interior of the house is a drum built around this swing that can turn 360 degrees, giving the visitors the illusion that they themselves are turning upside down. The music of Villa Volta was created by Ruud Bos, who also made the music for a number of other Efteling rides, such as Fata Morgana.

The same ride model can be found at Alton Towers in England. The ride is known as Hex – the Legend of the Towers and is based around a local myth linked to the historical Towers building. Other madhouses have since opened at Drayton Manor (The Haunting) and Parc Astérix (Le Défi de César).

== Awards and recognition ==
- Thea Award for Outstanding Achievement (1997)
