= Tow boat ride =

Water ride

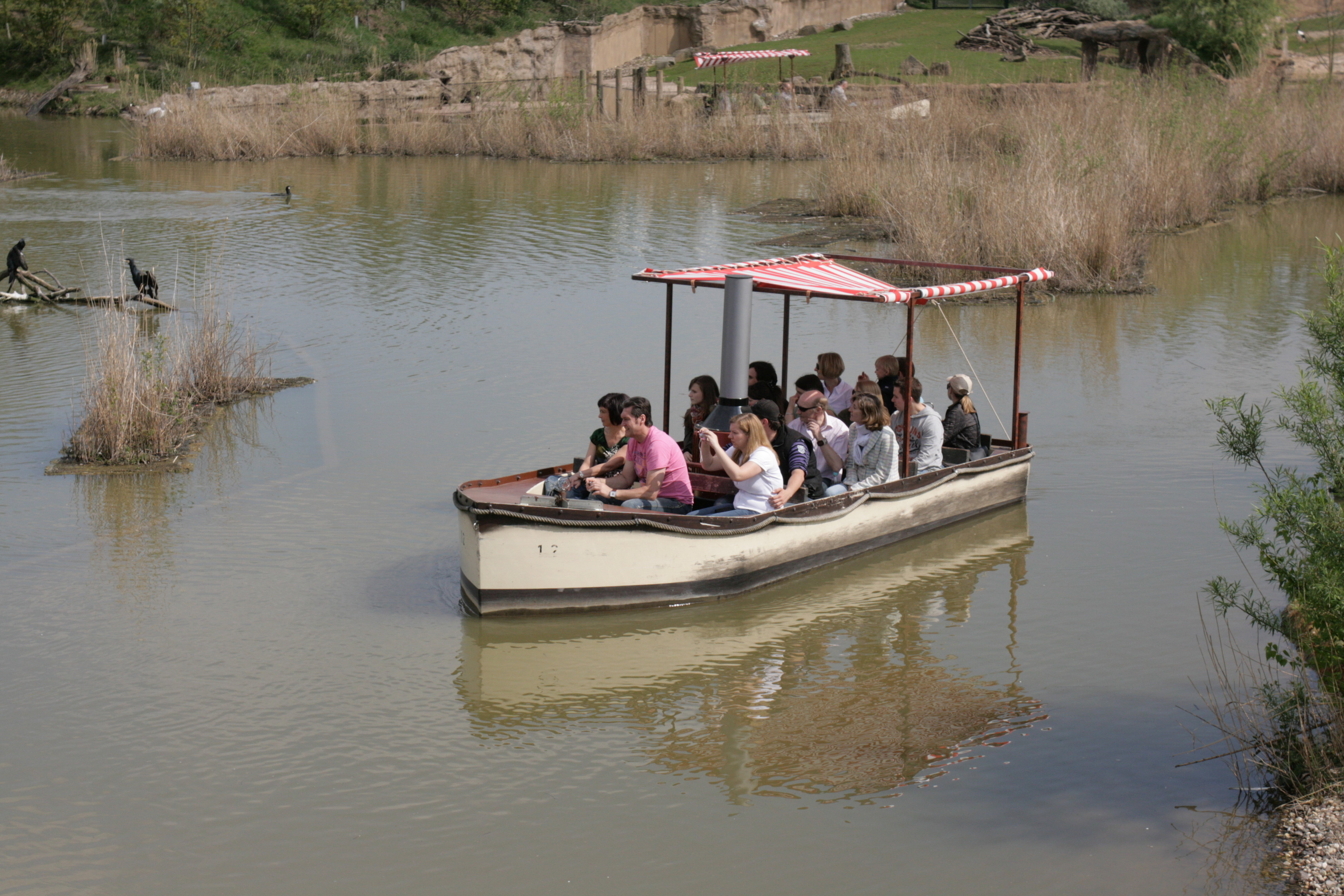
African Queen — ZOOM Erlebniswelt Gelsenkirchen.

A tow boat ride is a water ride constructed on a body of water. The course is defined by a main drive underwater cable, creating the impression of free floating boats. The station could be a revolving platform.

== Partial list of tow boat rides ==
Name	Park	Country	Opened	Manufacturer	Status	Ref
Africa Cruise; Formerly Adventure Jungle	Nigloland	France	1987	Mack Rides	Operating	
African Queen	ZOOM Erlebniswelt Gelsenkirchen	Germany	2006	Intamin	Operating	
Canale Grande; Formerly Rivière des castors	Spreepark; Mirapolis	Germany; France	1994 to 2002; 1987 to 1991	Reverchon Industries	Removed	
Josefinas kaiserliche Zauberreise	Europa-Park	Germany	1978	Mack Rides	Operating	
Embarque	World of Discoveries	Portugal	2014	Reverchon Industries	Operating	
Épidemaïs Croisières; Formerly Balade d'Astérix	Parc Astérix	France	1989	Intamin	Operating	
Excalibur	Drayton Manor Theme Park	United Kingdom	2003 to 2011	Bear Rides	Removed	
Fahrt des Odysseus	Belantis	Germany	2003	Bear Rides	Operating	
Fata Morgana	Efteling	Netherlands	1986	Intamin	Operating	
Fatih's Dream	Vialand	Turkey	2014	Intamin	Operating	
Floßfahrt	Heide Park	Germany	1978	Mack Rides	Operating	
Gamanile River	Leipzig Zoological Garden	Germany	2011	Intamin	Operating	
Gold River Adventure; Formerly Les Radeaux and Tintin dans la Jungle	Walibi Belgium	Belgium	1978 to 2023	Intamin	Removed	
Gondoletta	Luisenpark	Germany	1975	Intamin	Operating	
Gondoletta	Stadtgarten Karlsruhe	Germany	1967	Unknown	Operating	
Gondoletta	Efteling	Netherlands	1981	Intamin	Operating	
Jungla	Parque de Atracciones de Madrid	Spain	1977	Unknown	Operating	
Jungle mission Formerly Jungle adventure, Bob & Bobette and Voodoo river	Bellewaerde	Belgium	1978	Intamin	Operating	
Käpt'n Blaubärs Abenteuerfahrt	Ravensburger Spieleland	Germany	1998	Mack Rides	Operating	
Kid's Catamaran	Leofoo Village Theme Park	Taiwan	Unknown	Unknown	Operating	
Lac des chercheurs d'or	Le Pal	France	Unknown	Mack Rides	Operating	
Lazy River Boat Trip	Chester Zoo	United Kingdom	2015	Intamin	Operating	
Le Pays des Contes de Fées	Disneyland Park	France	1994	Mack Rides	Operating	
Paysages d’Europe	Futuroscope	France	1992 to 1998	Intamin	Operating	
Piratbåde	Legoland Billund	Denmark	Unknown	Mack Rides	Operating	
Radeaux	Didi'Land	France	1982 to 2013	Unknown	Removed	
Sambesi Bootsfahrt	Hanover Zoo	Germany	2000	Intamin	Operating	
Swan Boats	Alton Towers	United Kingdom	1987 to 2003	Intamin	Removed	
Tam-Tam Aventure; Formerly Tam Tam Tour	Walibi Rhône-Alpes	France	1992	Soquet	Operating	
Tam Tam Tour	Walibi Sud-Ouest	France	1992	Unknown	Operating	
Tom Sawyer Raft Ride	Blackpool Pleasure Beach	United Kingdom	1974 to 1993	Intamin	Removed	
Tow boat	Dream Park	Egypt	1998	Intamin	Operating	
Tow boats	Geroland	Egypt	1997	ABC Rides	Operating	
Tropical Cruise	Dragon Park Ha Long	Vietnam	2017	Intamin	Operating	
Tunga	Gardaland	Italy	1975 to 2009	Intamin	Removed	
Urzeit Floßfahrt	Freizeitpark Plohn	Germany	1997	Mack Rides	Operating	
Venice Gondola	Genting Indoor Theme Park	Malaysia	Unknown	Zamperla	Operating	
Waly boat Formerly Embarcadère	Walygator Parc	France	1989	Mack Rides	Operating	
Zattere	Minitalia Leolandia Park	Italy	1997	Unknown	Operating	

== Gallery ==
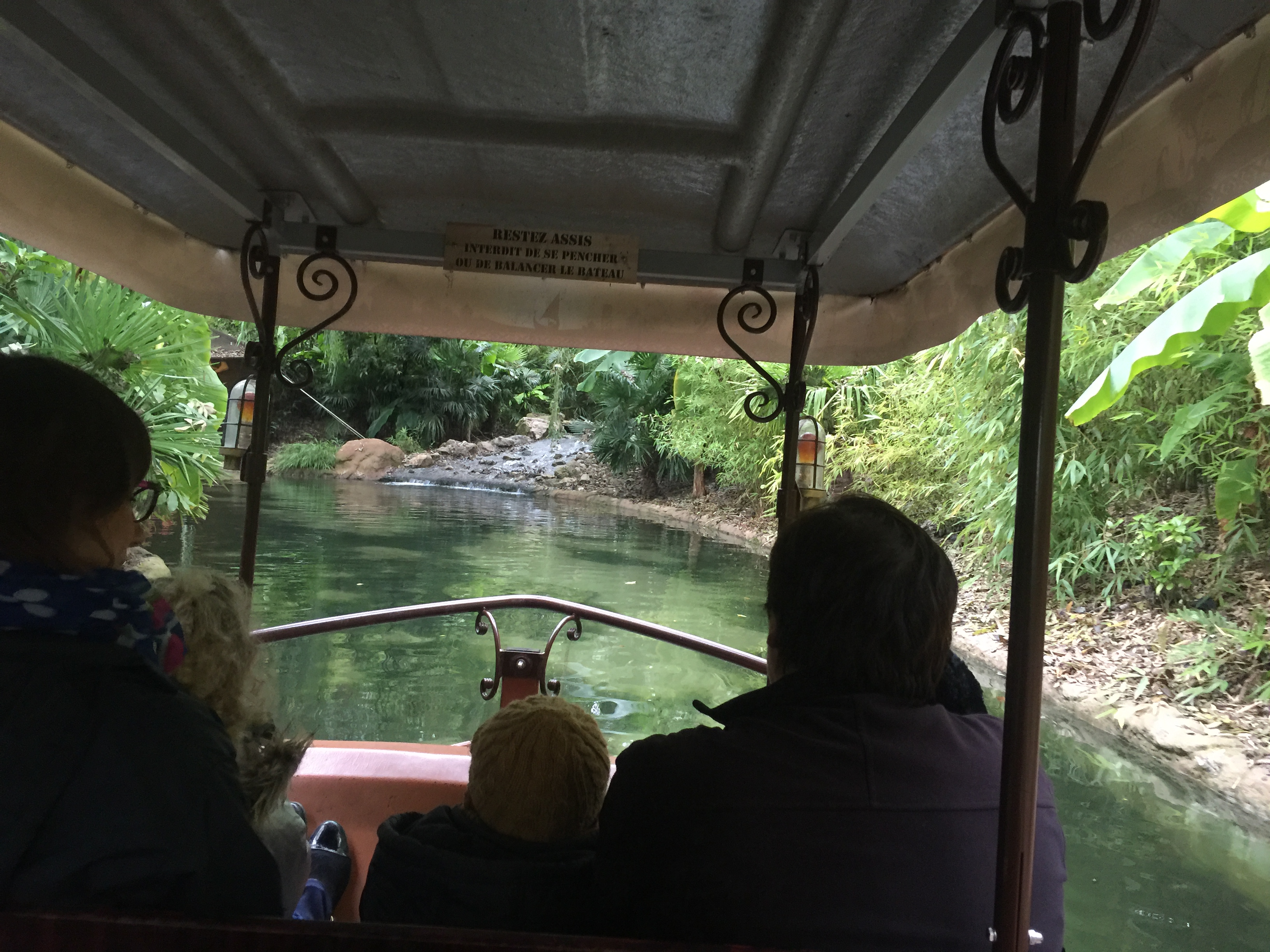
Africa Cruise — Nigloland.

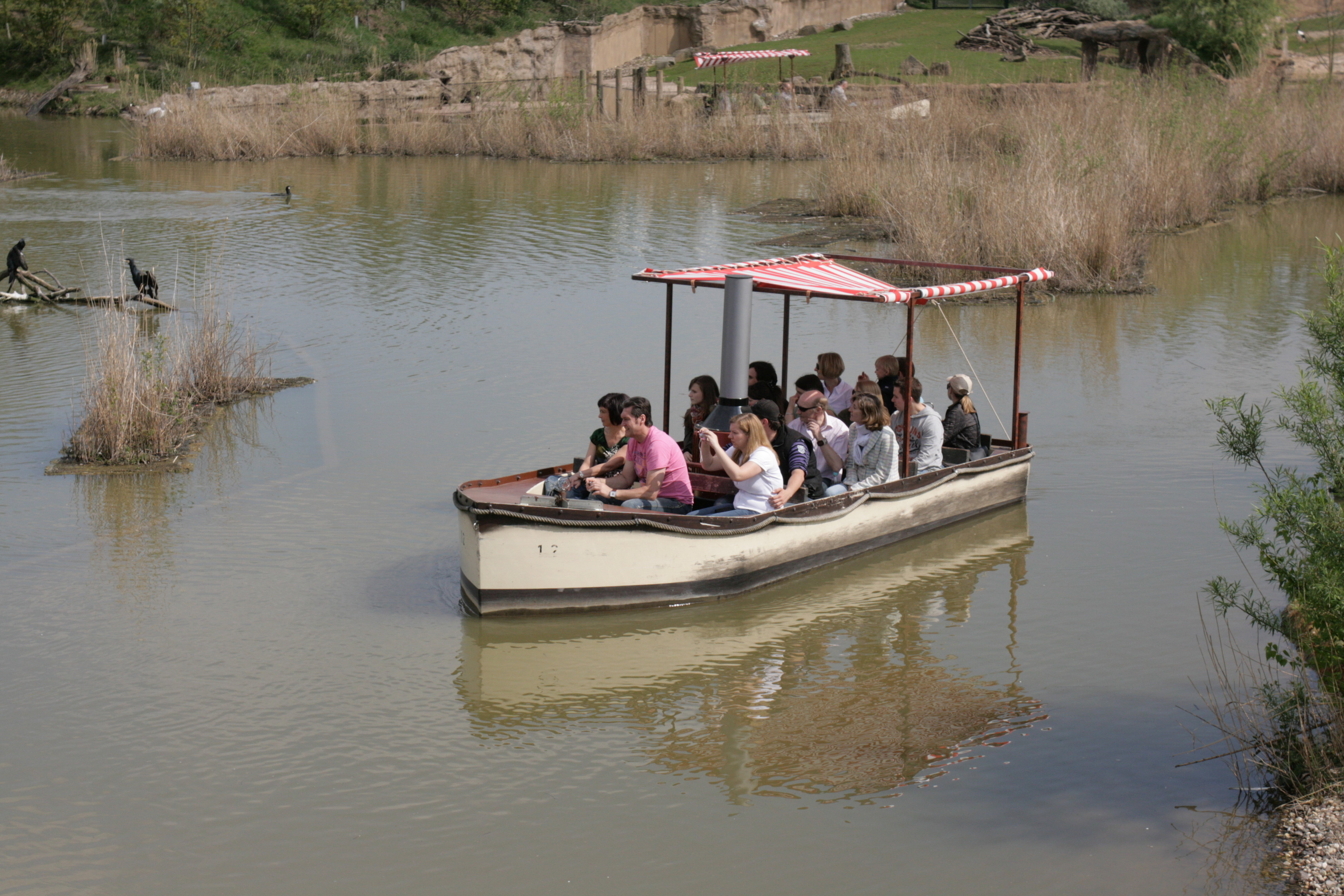
African Queen — ZOOM Erlebniswelt Gelsenkirchen.

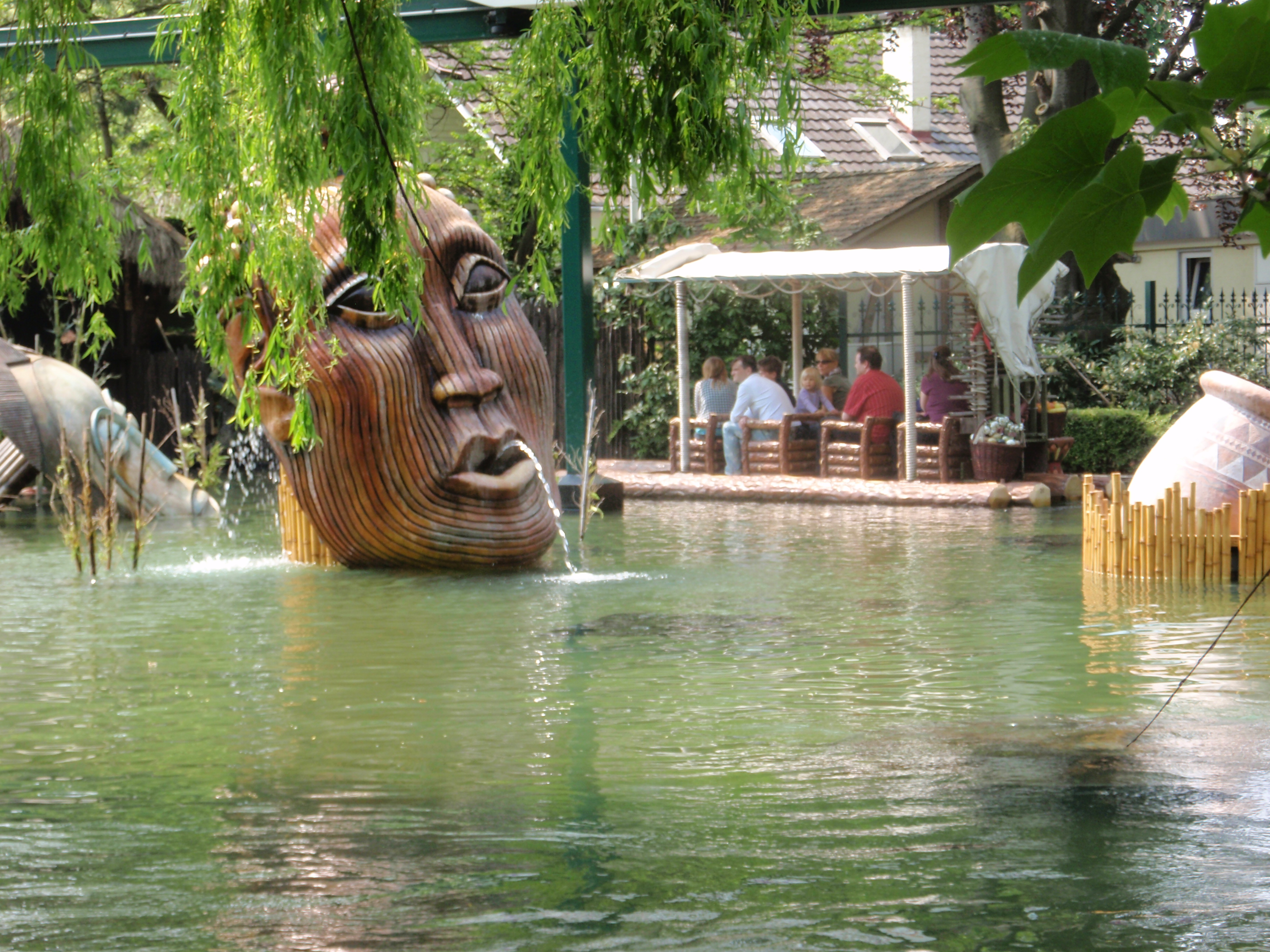
Dschungel Fahrt — Europa-Park.

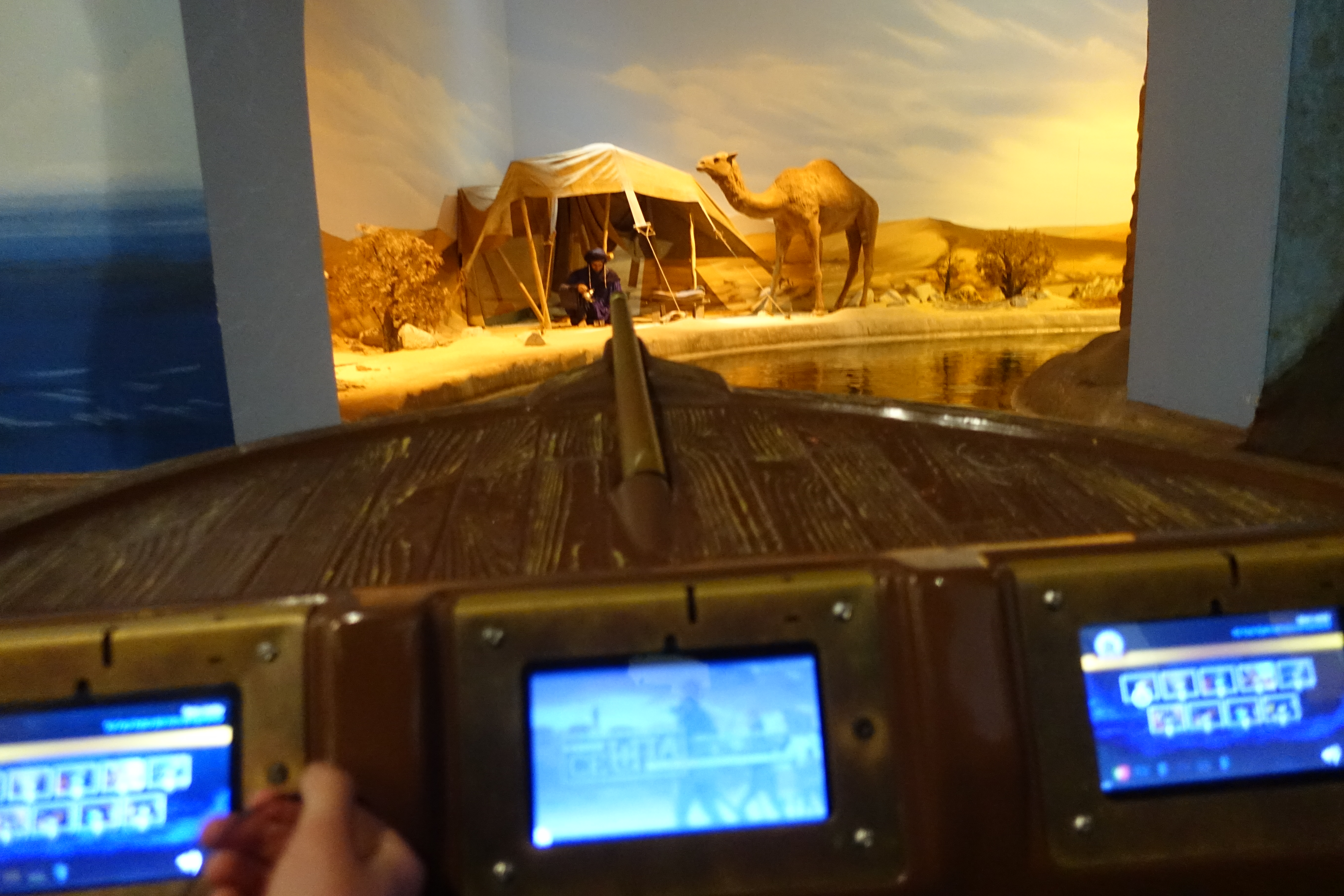
Embarque — World of Discoveries.

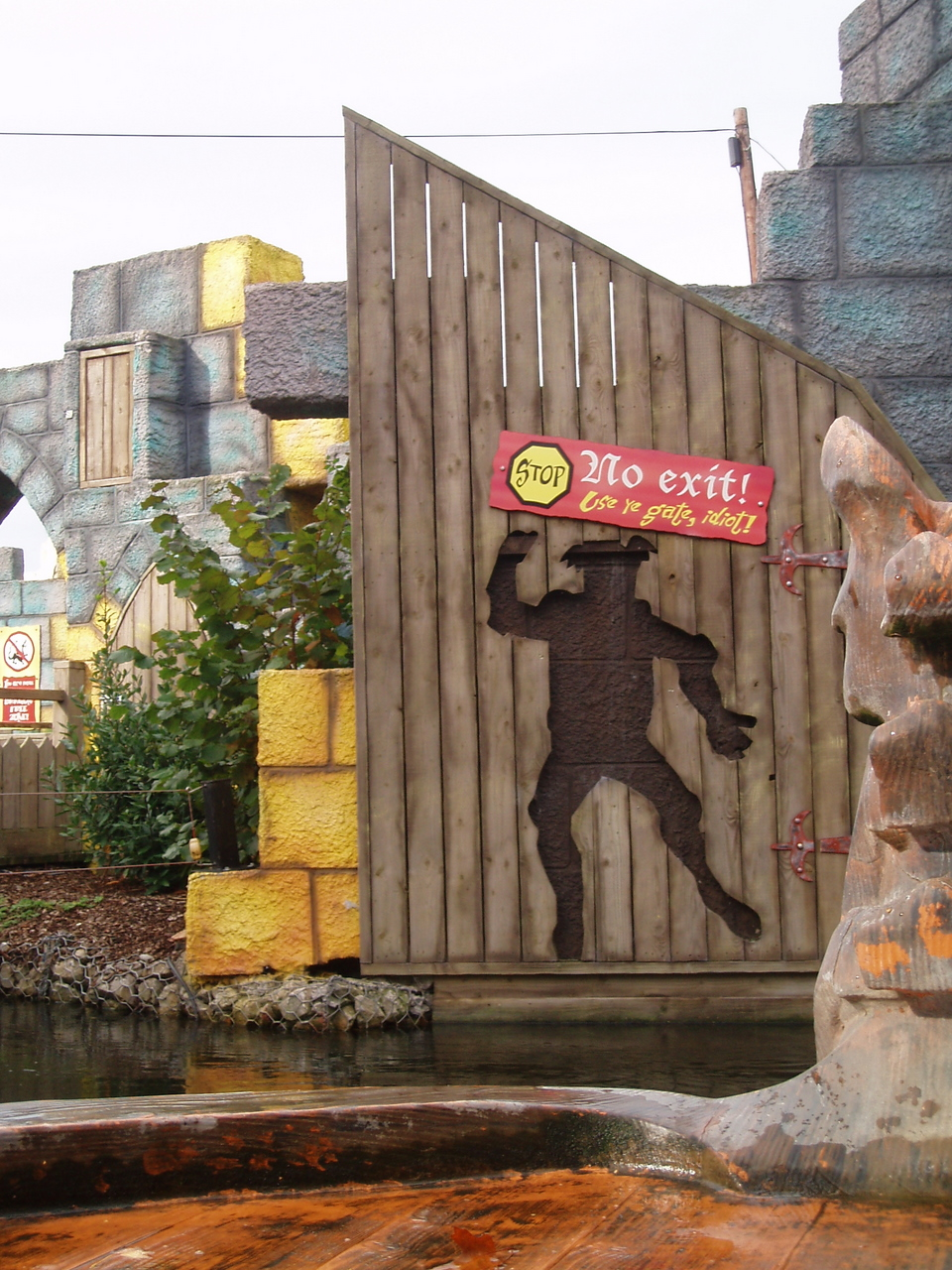
Excalibur — Drayton Manor Theme Park.

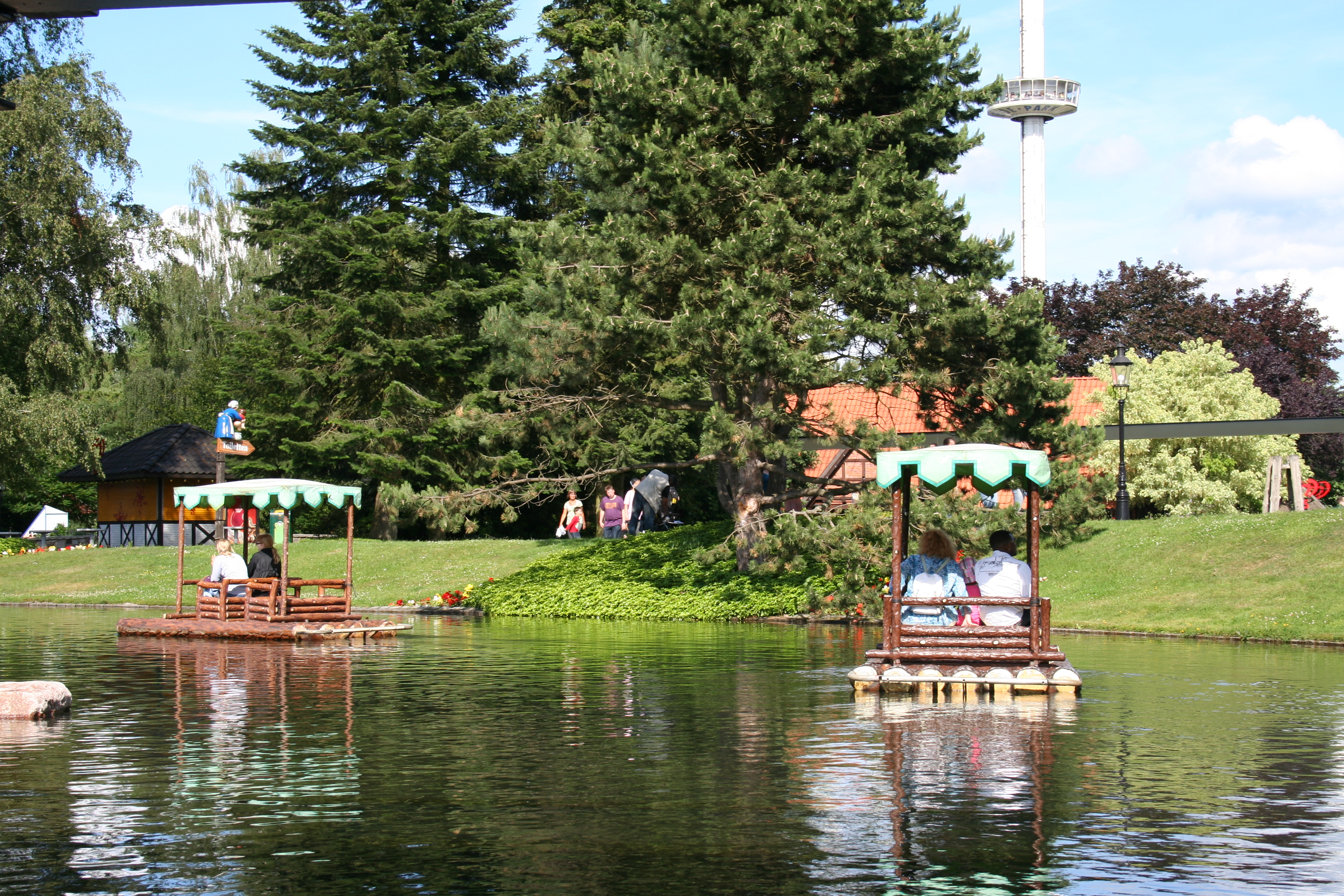
Floßfahrt — Heide Park.

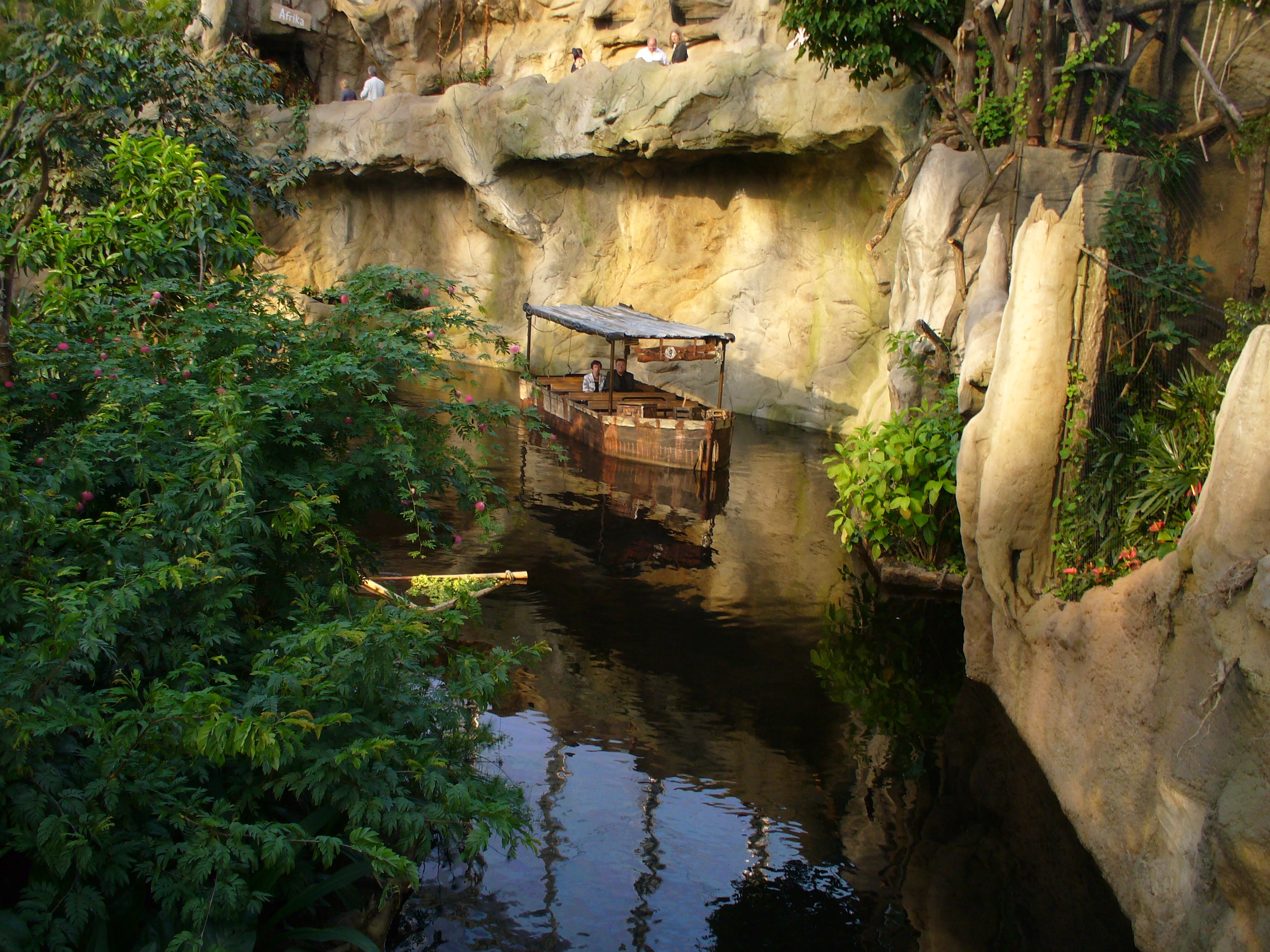
Gamanile River — Leipzig Zoological Garden.

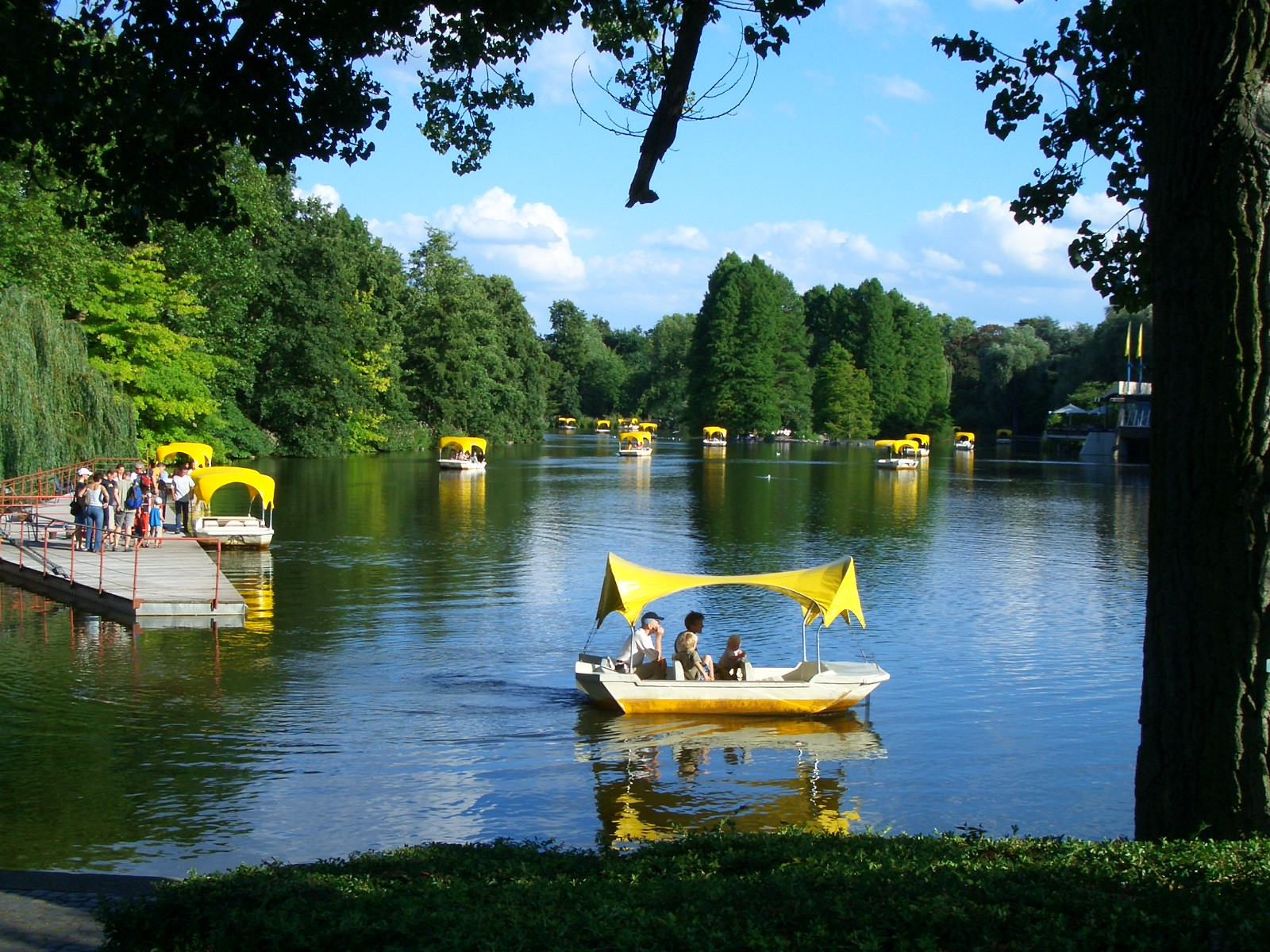
Gondoletta — Luisenpark.

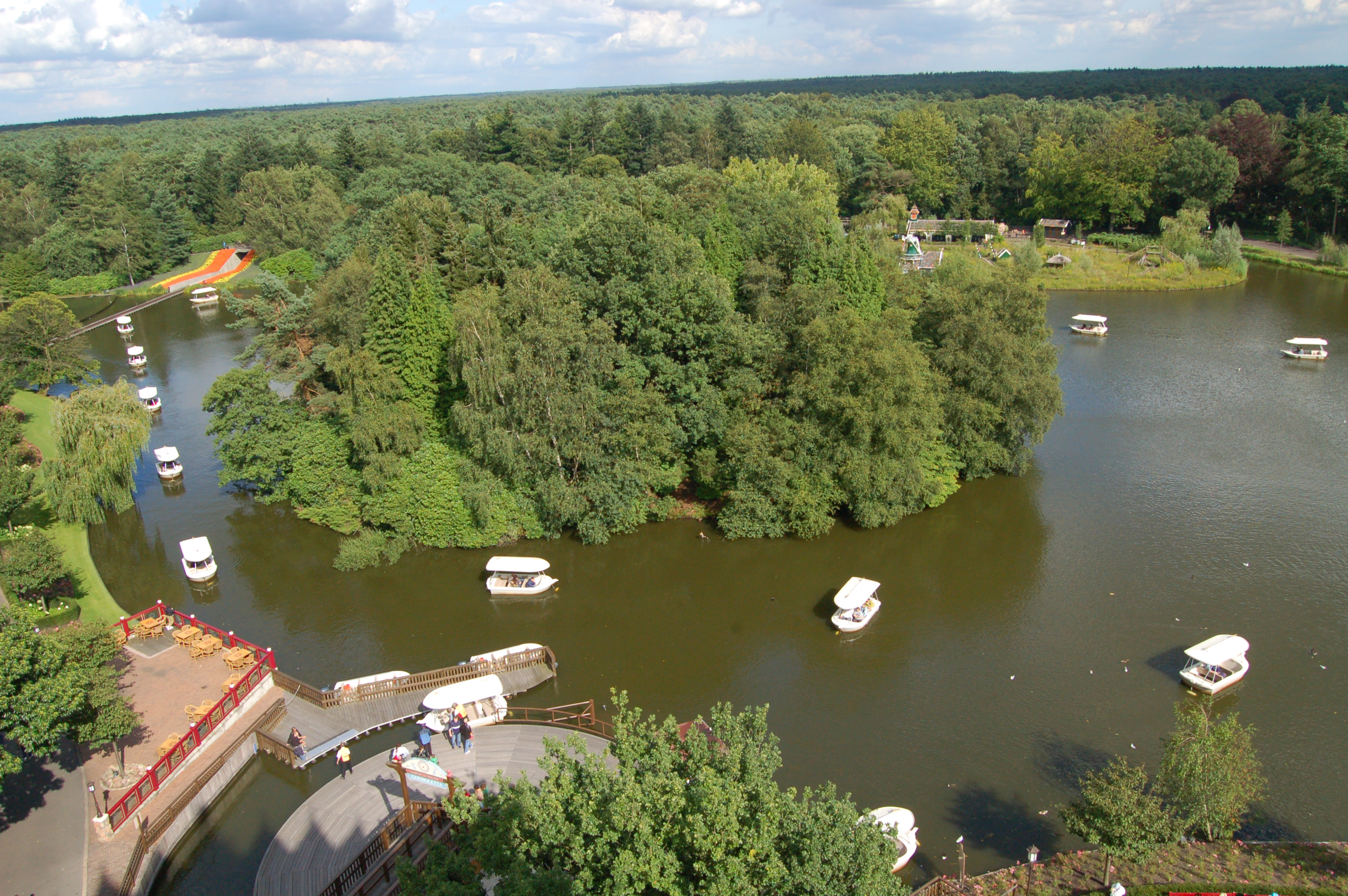
Gondoletta — Efteling.

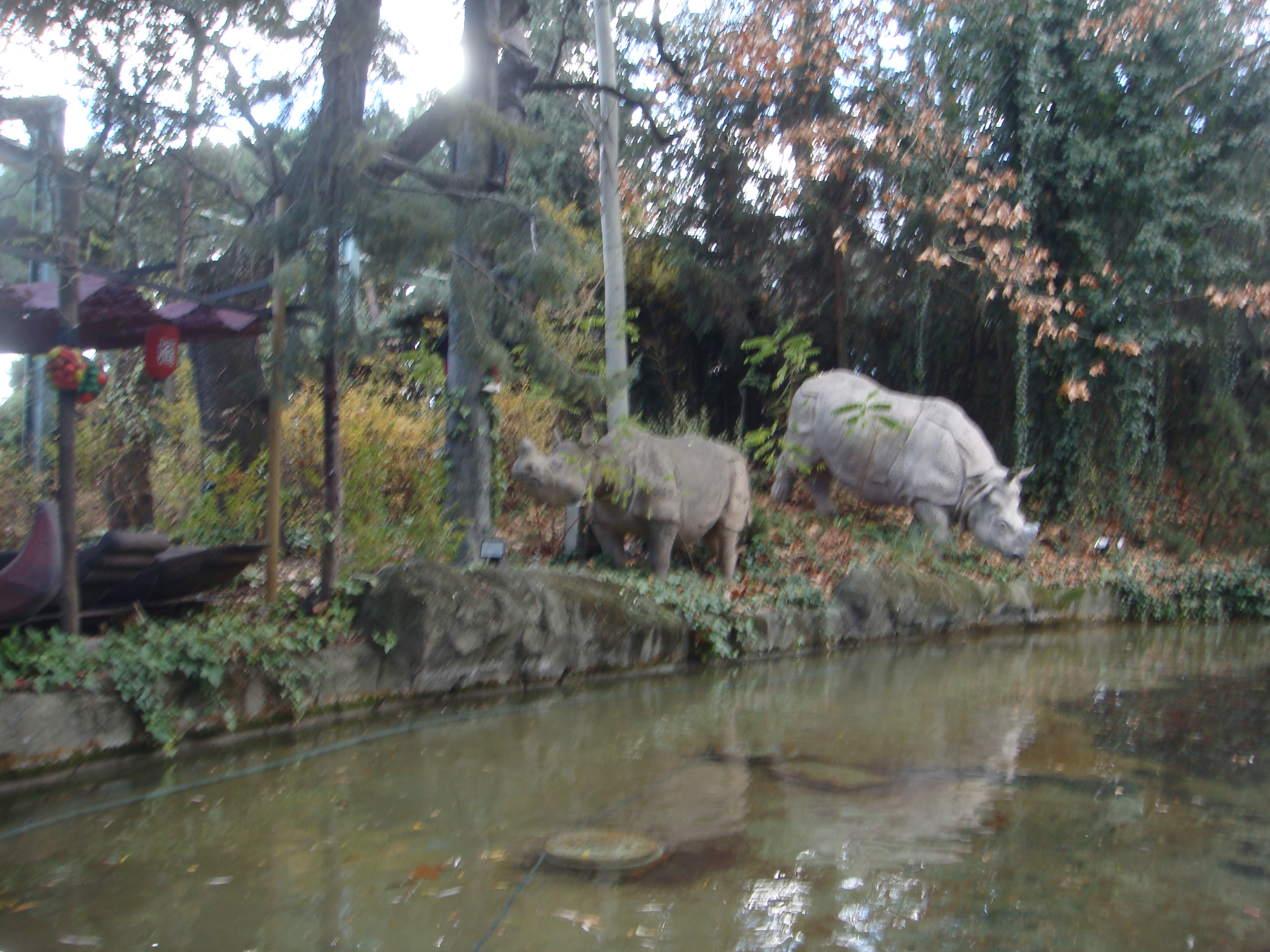
Jungla — Parque de Atracciones de Madrid.

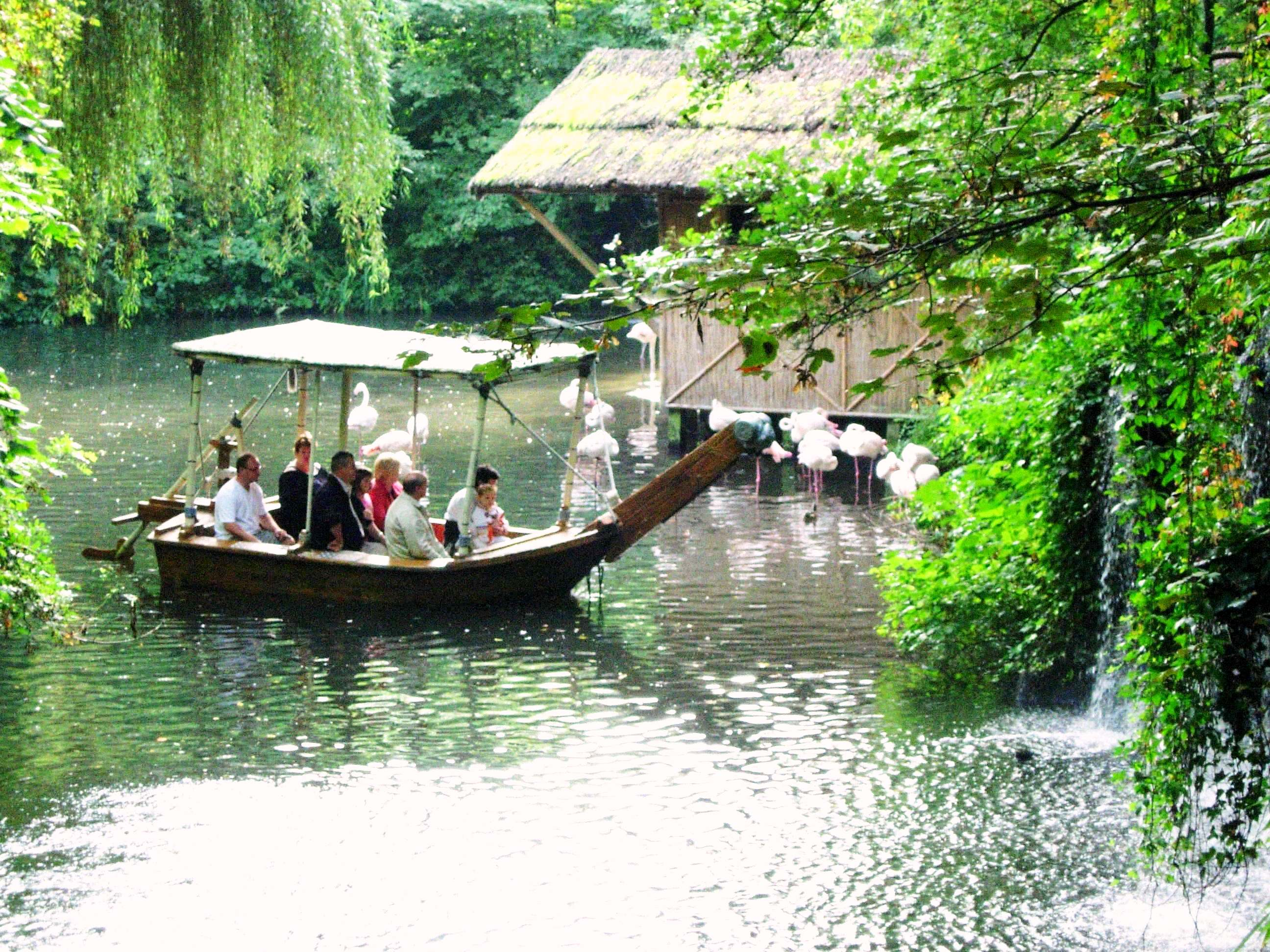
Jungle mission — Bellewaerde.

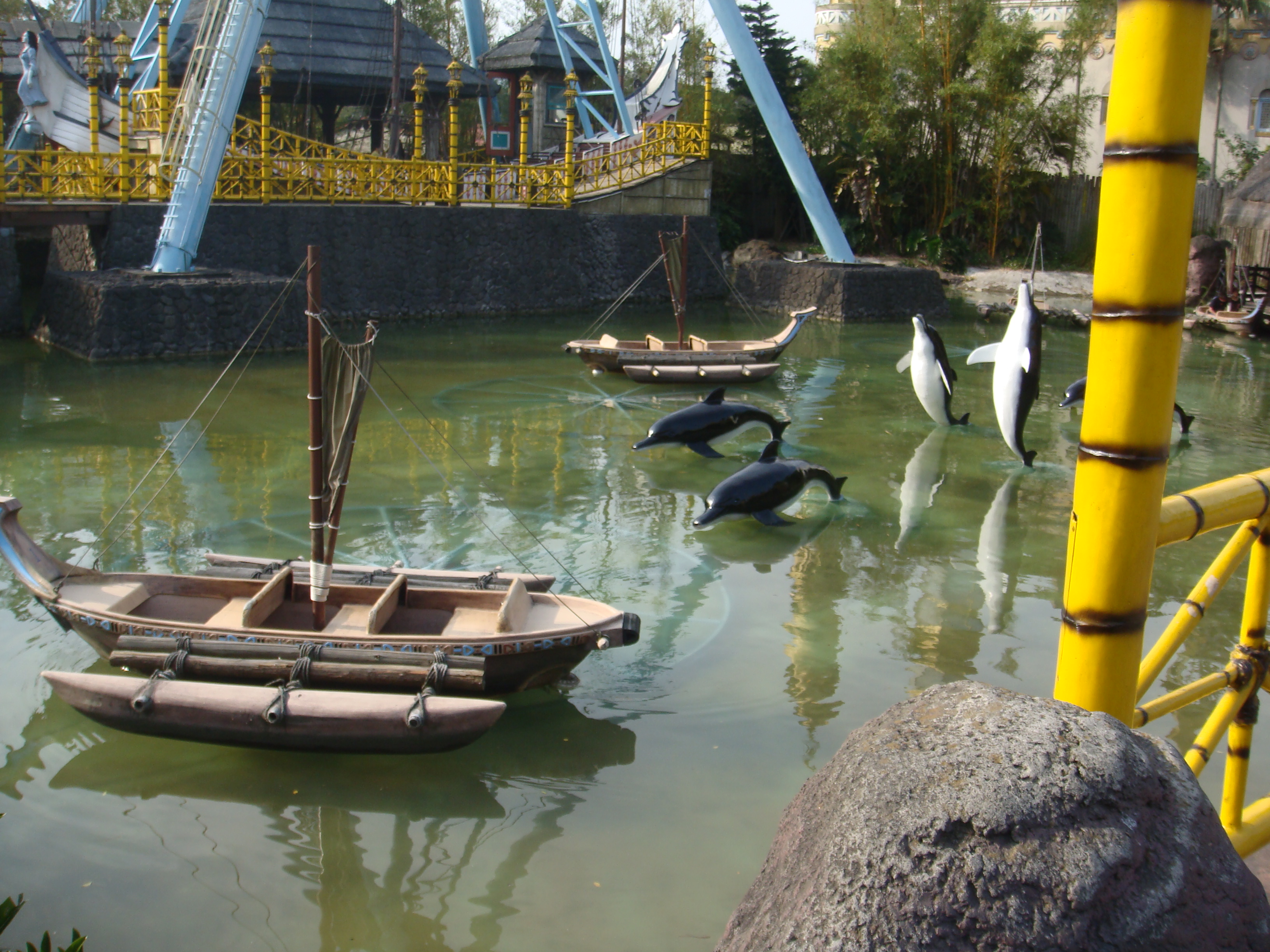
Kid's Catamaran — Leofoo Village Theme Park.

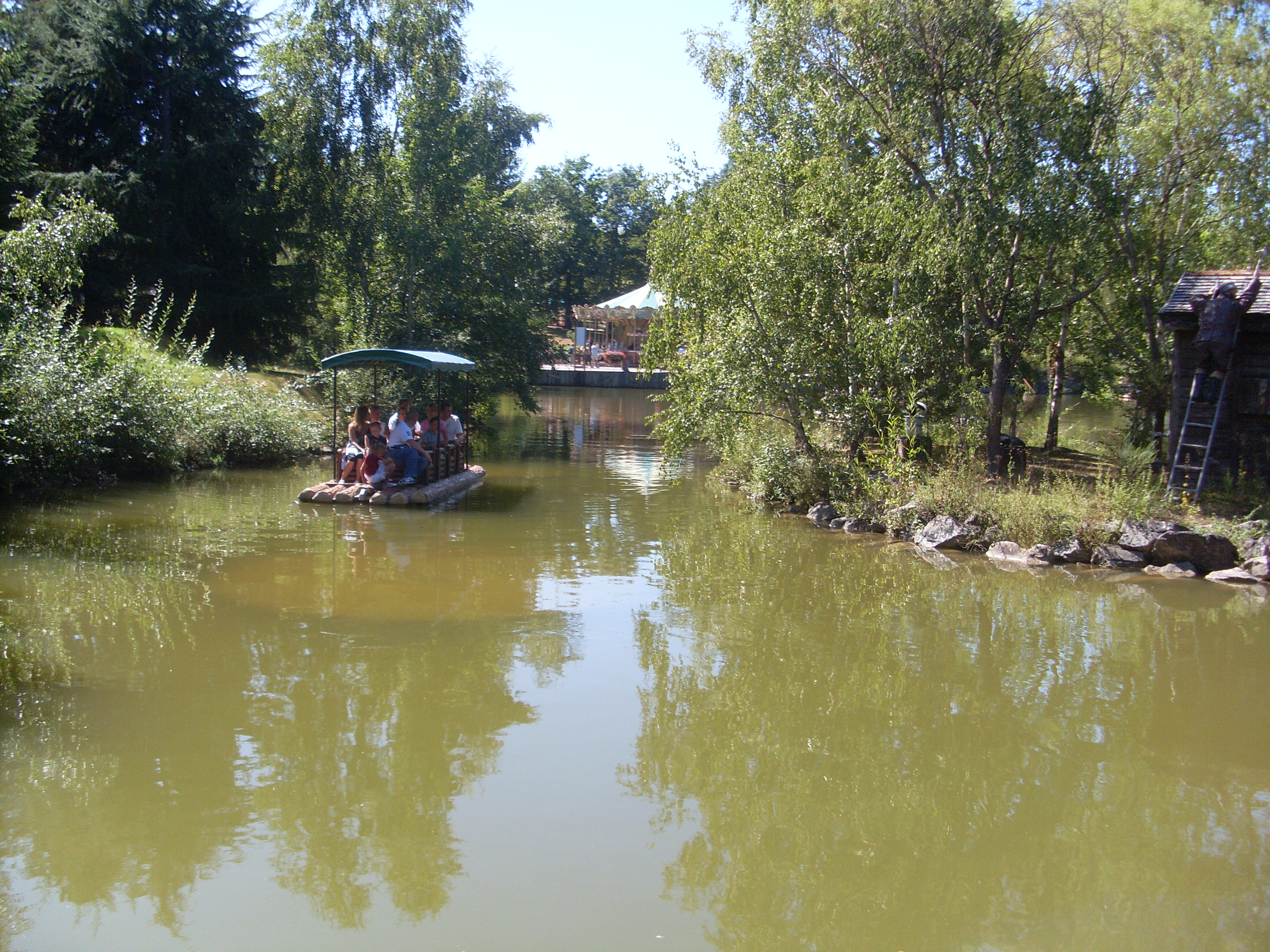
Lac des chercheurs d'or — Le Pal.

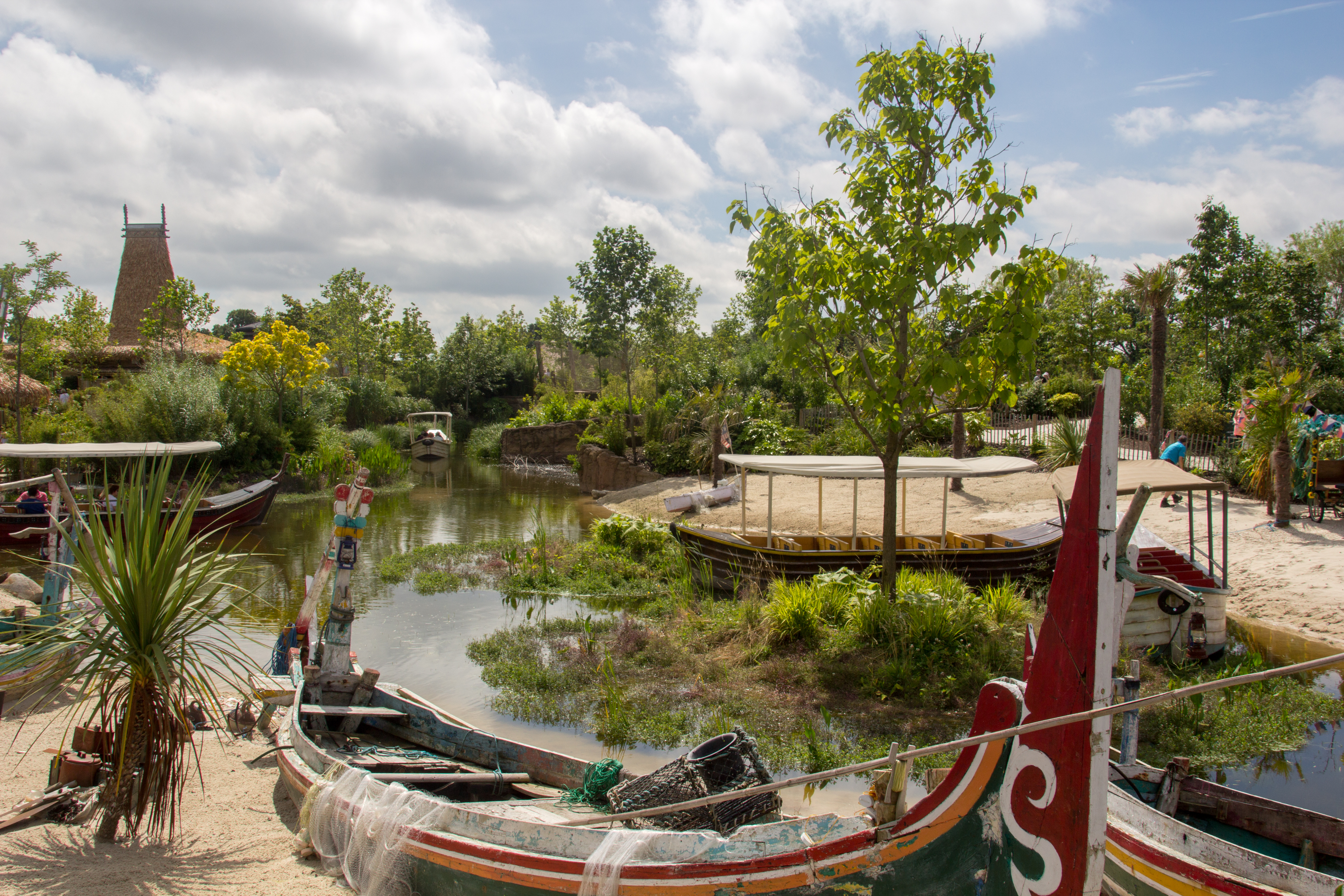
Lazy River Boat Trip — Chester Zoo.

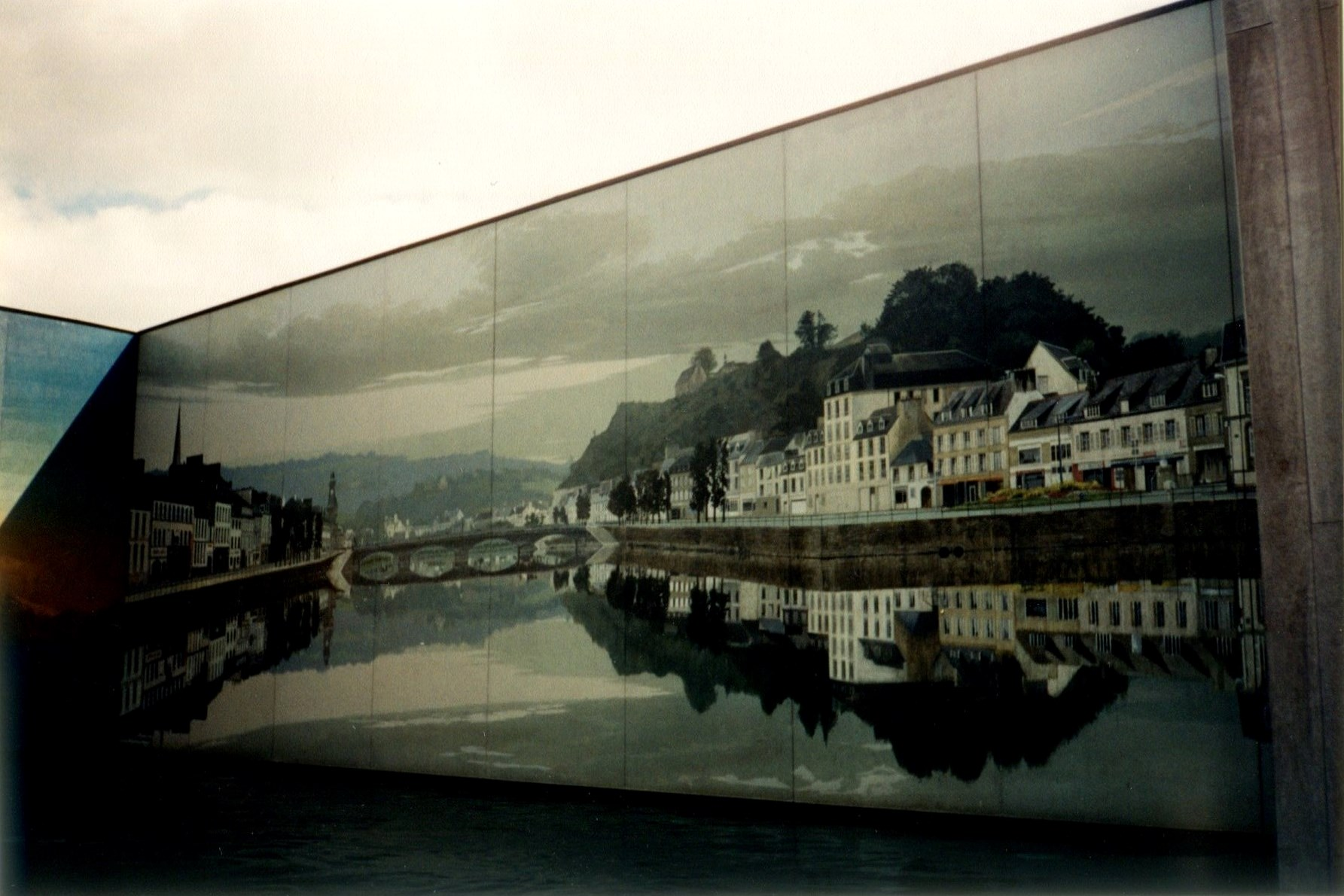
Paysage d'Europe — Futuroscope.

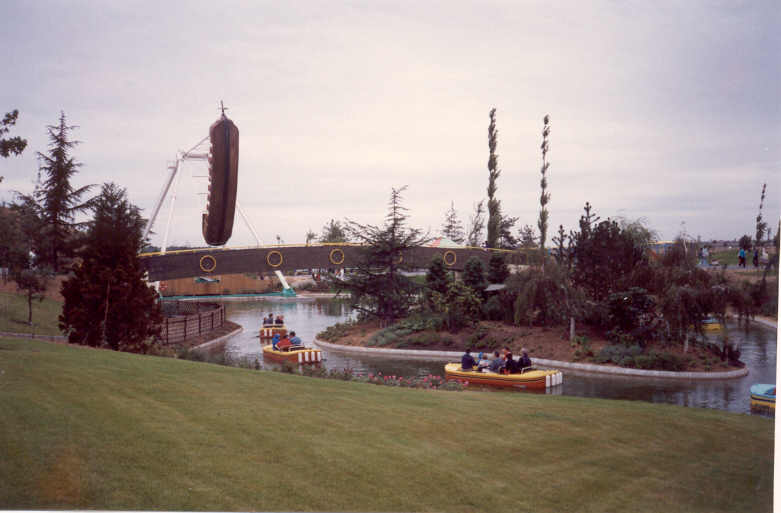
Rivière des castors — Mirapolis.

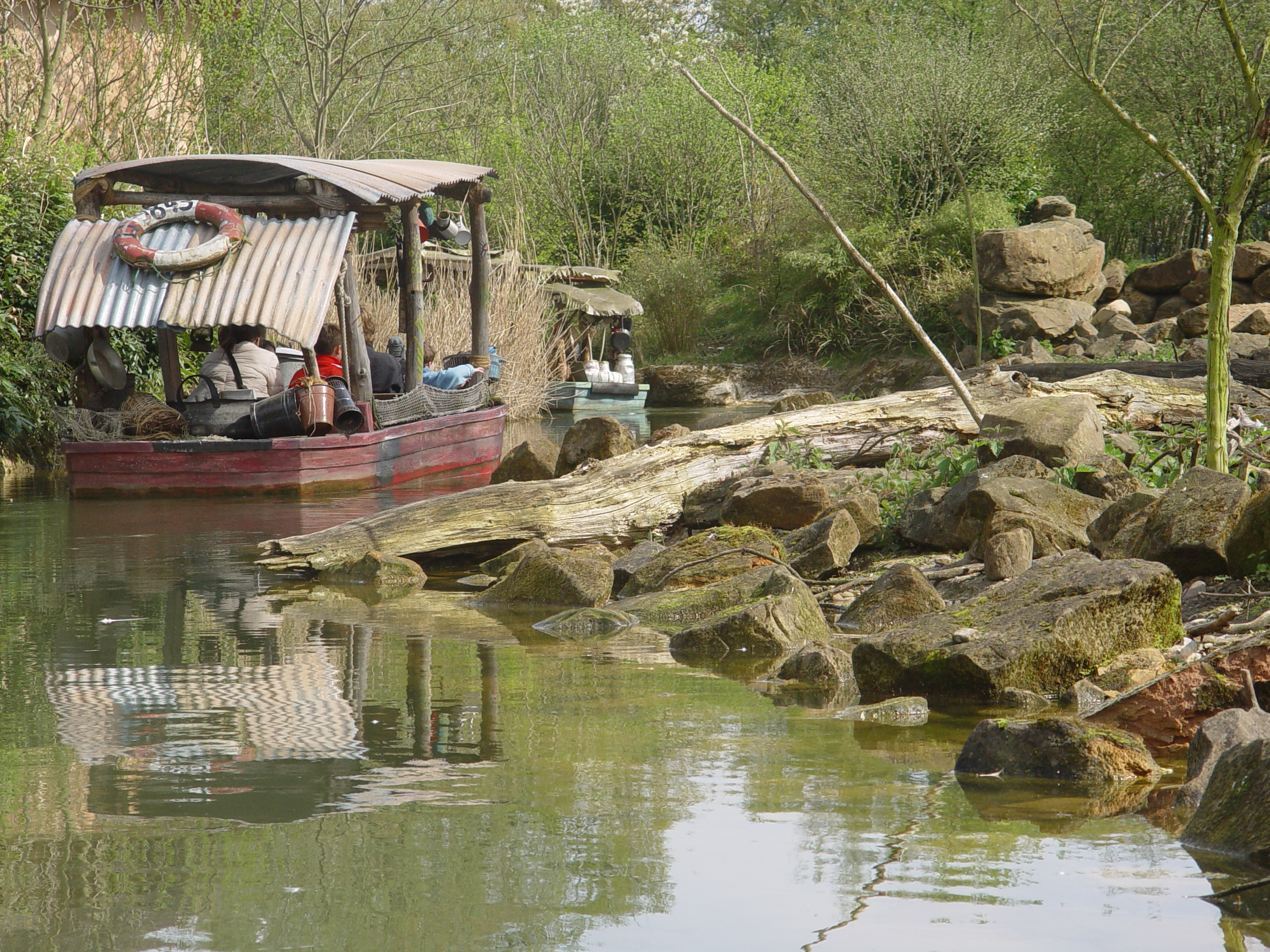
Sambesi Bootsfahrt — Hanover Zoo.

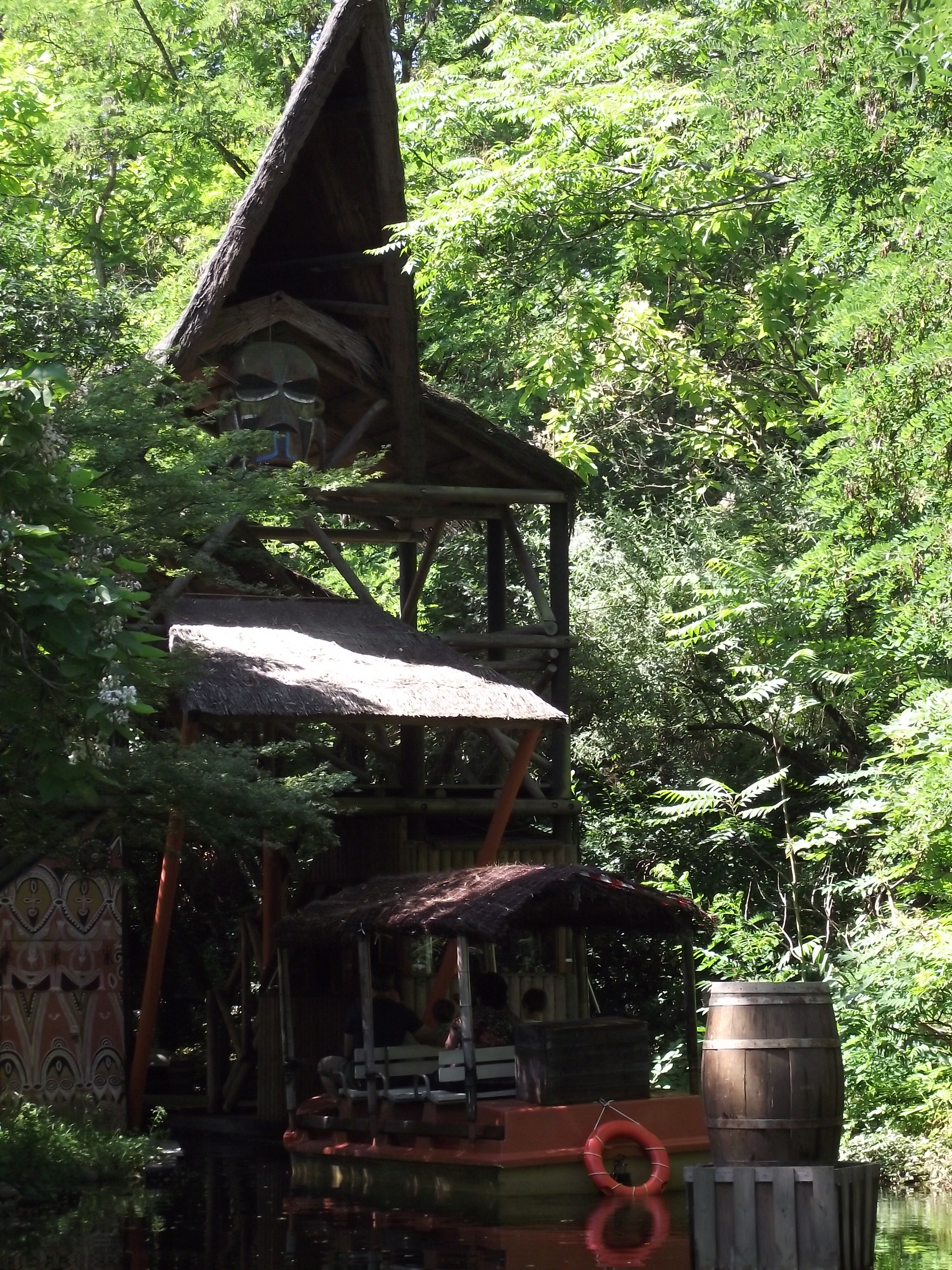
Tam Tam Tour — Walibi Sud-Ouest.

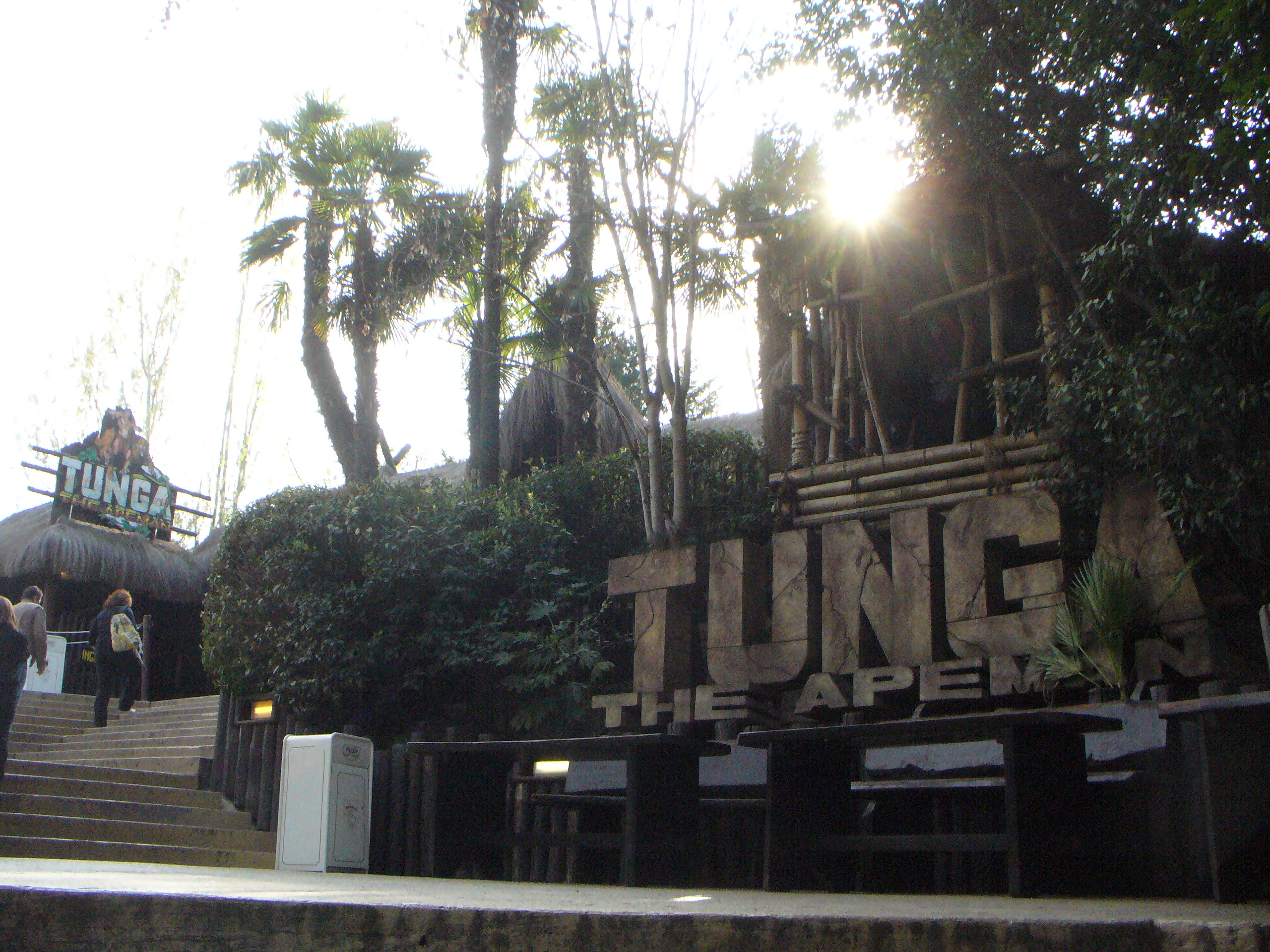
Tunga — Gardaland.

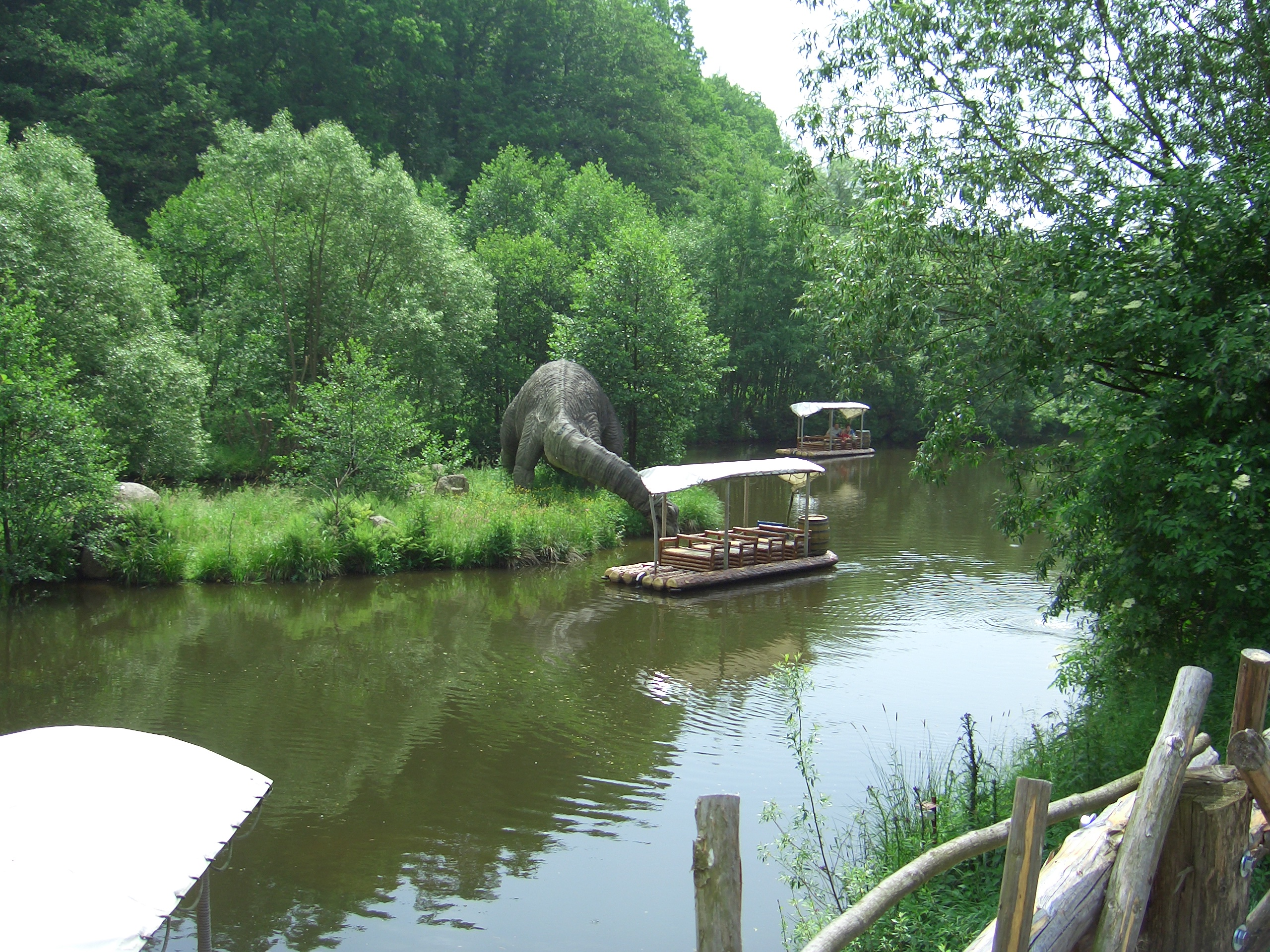
Urzeit Floßfahrt — Freizeitpark Plohn.

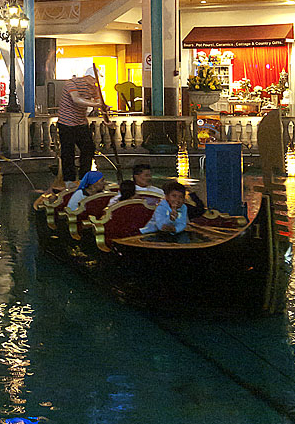
Venice Gondola — Genting Indoor Theme Park.

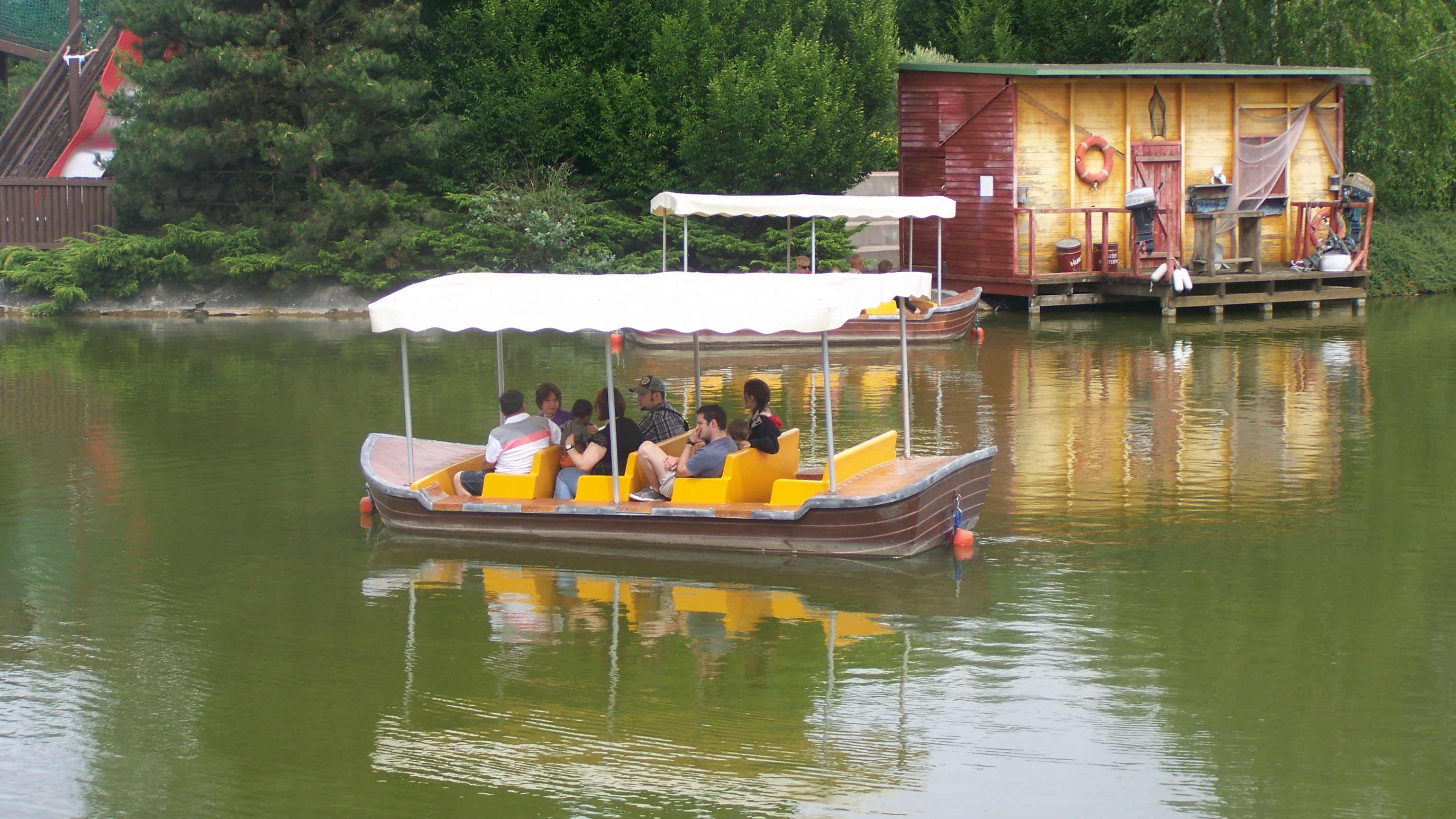
Waly boat — Walygator Parc.

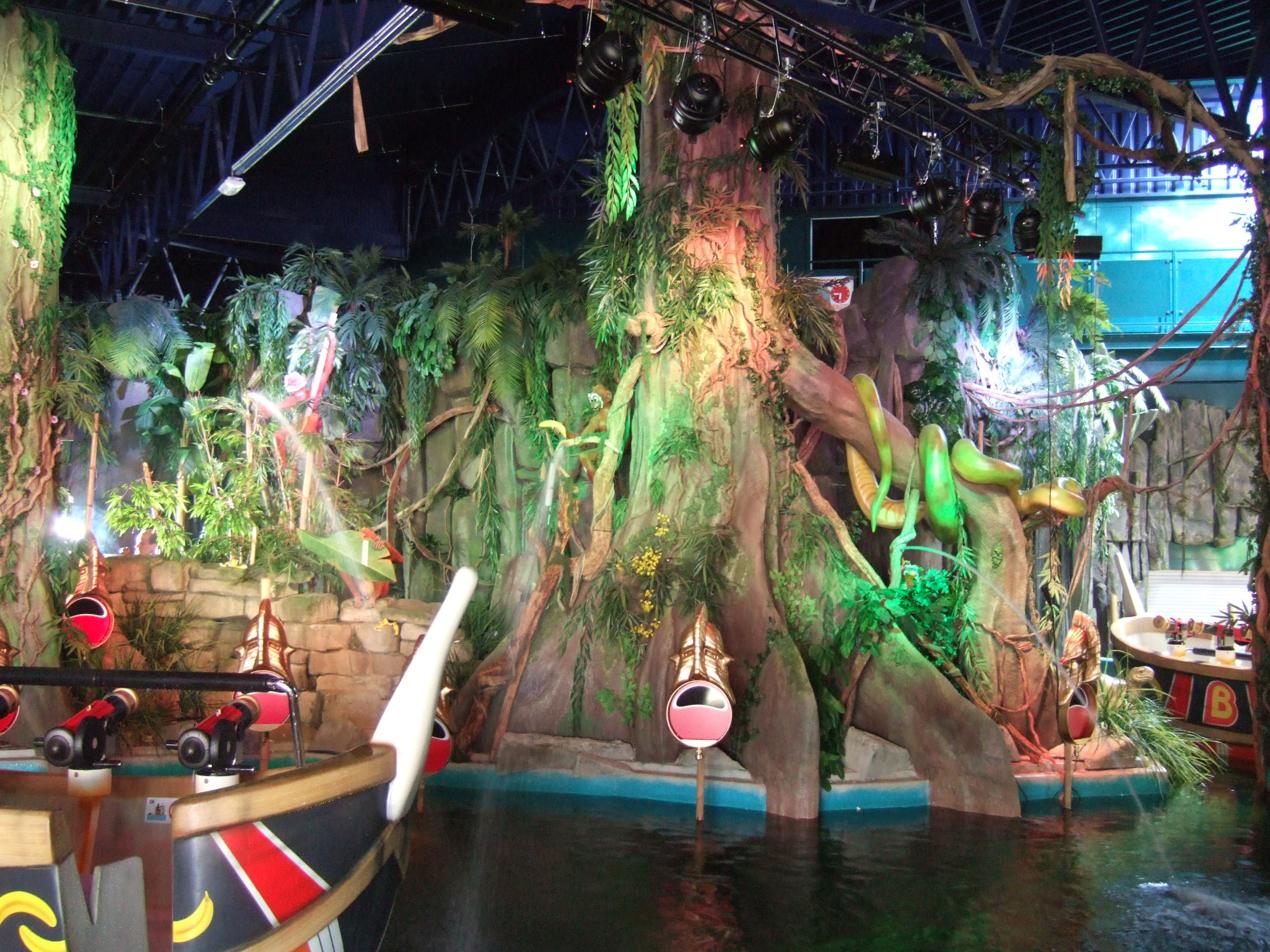
Banana Battle — Bobbejaanland. Splash Battle using tow boat ride's technology.

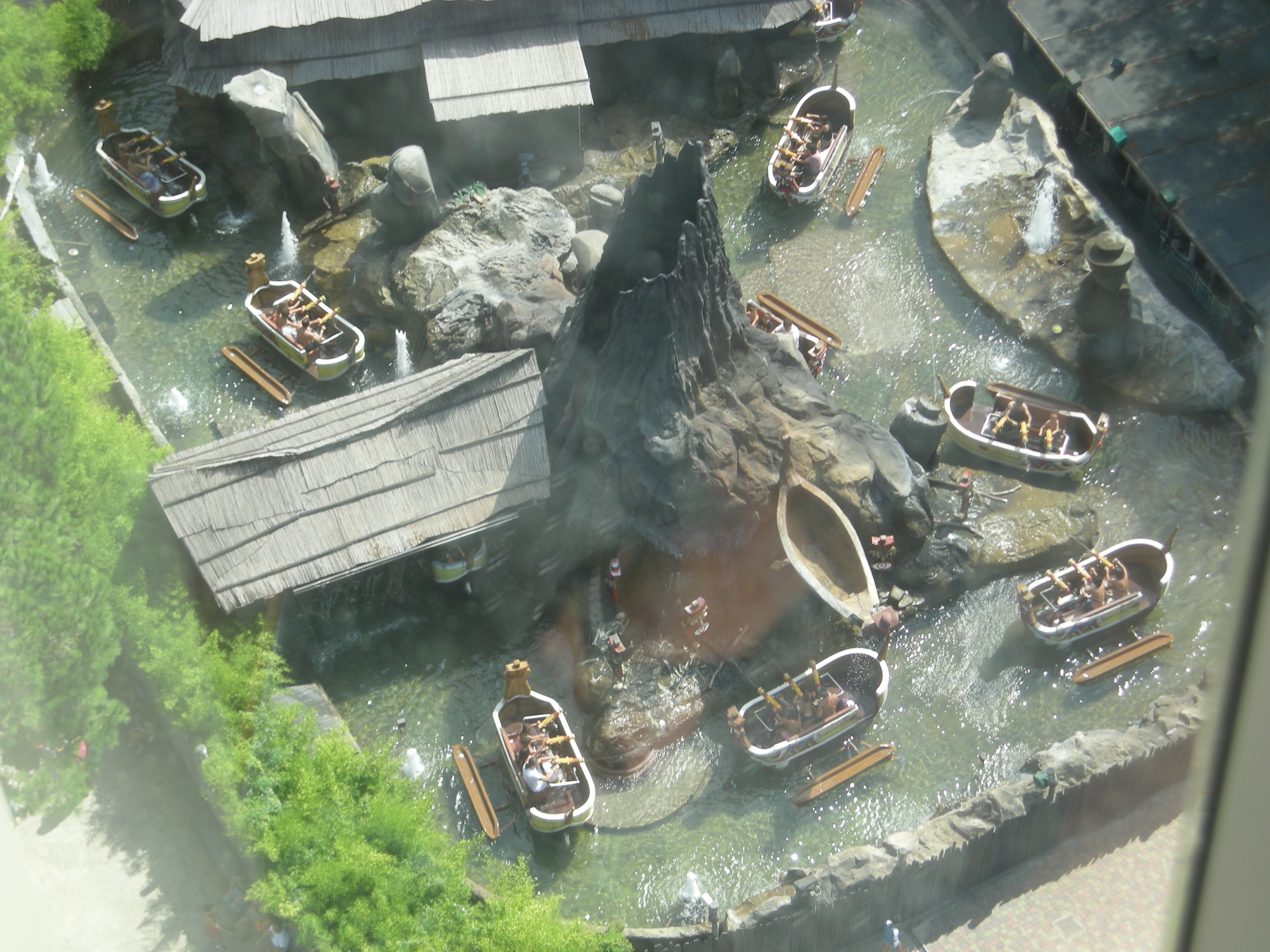
Raratonga — Mirabilandia. Splash Battle using tow boat ride's technology.

== See also ==
- Old Mill (ride)
- Chain boat navigation
