= Pagoda (Efteling) =

Observation tower variation

Coordinates: 51°39′02″N 5°03′03″E

Pagoda (or "Pagode" in Dutch) is an unobtrusive variation of an observation tower in the Efteling amusement park in the Netherlands. It was designed by Ton van de Ven and started operating in 1987.

== History and details ==
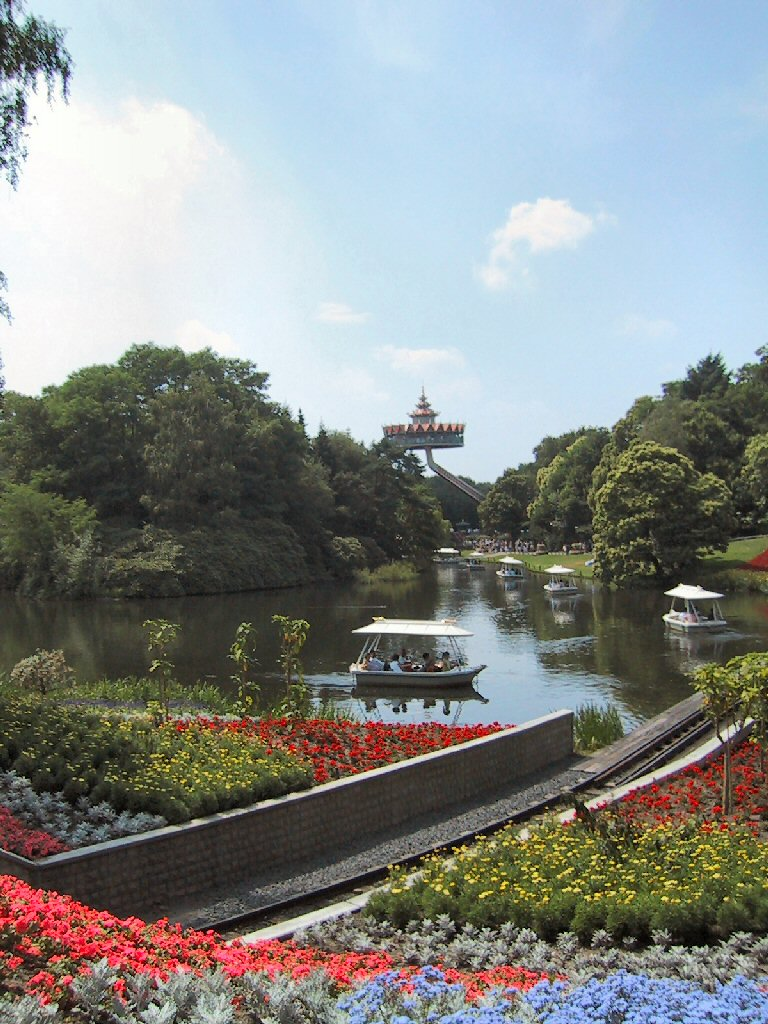
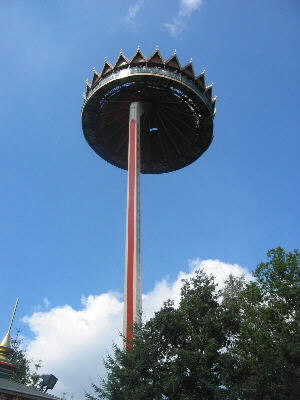
Pagoda rising people 45 metres for a view of the park and its surroundings

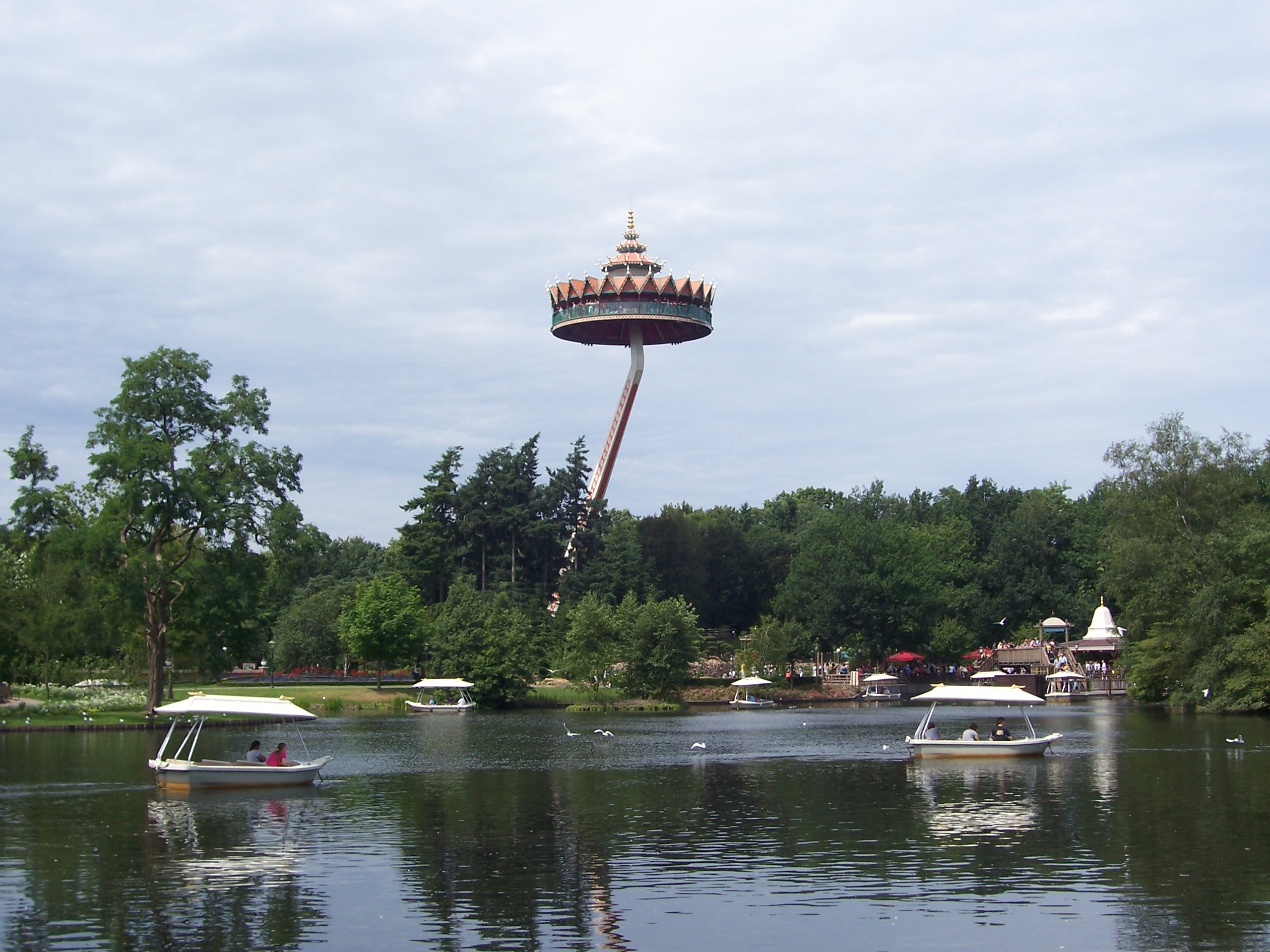
The Pagoda and the Gondoletta

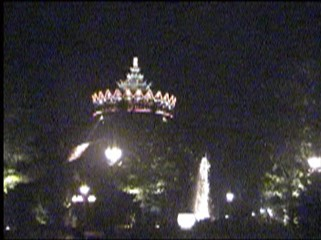
At night

The Pagoda, developed by Intamin as a flying island, is described by Efteling as a "flying temple".

It consists of a 155 tons weighing cabin and a 225-ton hydraulic arm which pivots it from the ground up to a height of 60 metres.

The counterweight of 340 tons sinks 30 metres into the ground.

To maintain the balance of the cabin itself the weight of the 100 visitors is distributed over its two sides.
The rotating cabin has a 15 metre high pagoda on top of it.

Ride length: 4 minutes
Ride capacity: 1500 passengers/ hour
Cost: €3.6 million
