= Gondoletta =

Water ride

Coordinates: 51°39′02″N 5°03′05″E

Gondoletta is a water ride in amusement park Efteling in the Netherlands. It was developed by Intamin (as a Tow boat ride); designed by Ton van de Ven and started operating in 1981.

== History and details ==
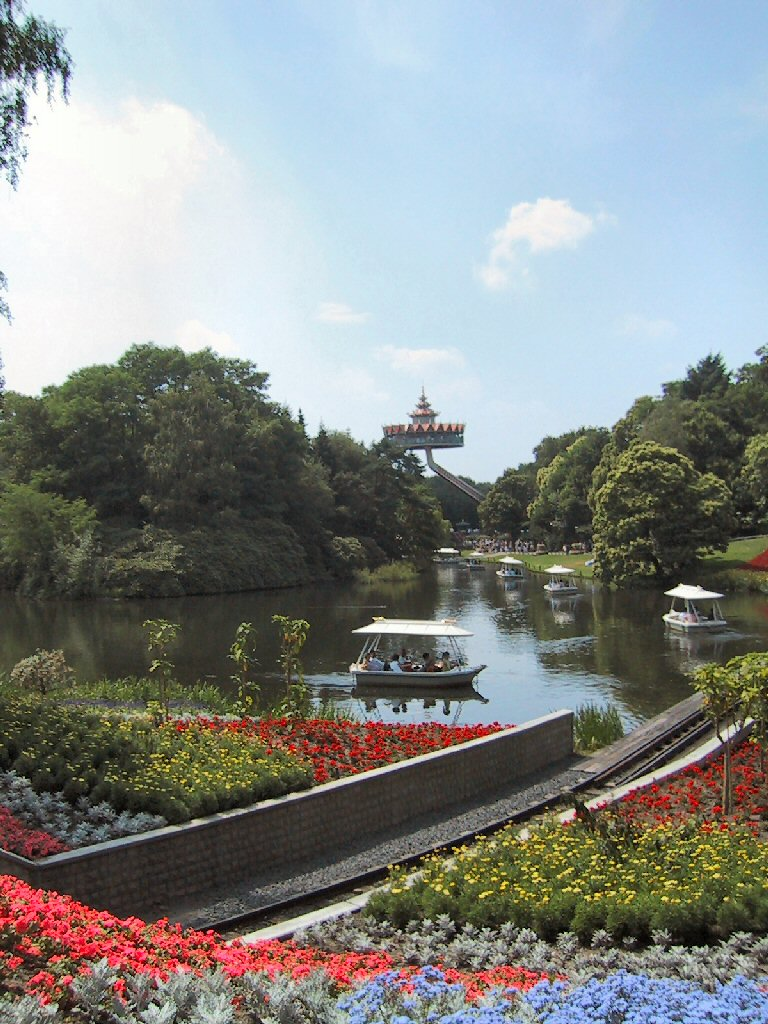
Gondoletta with the Pagoda rising in the back

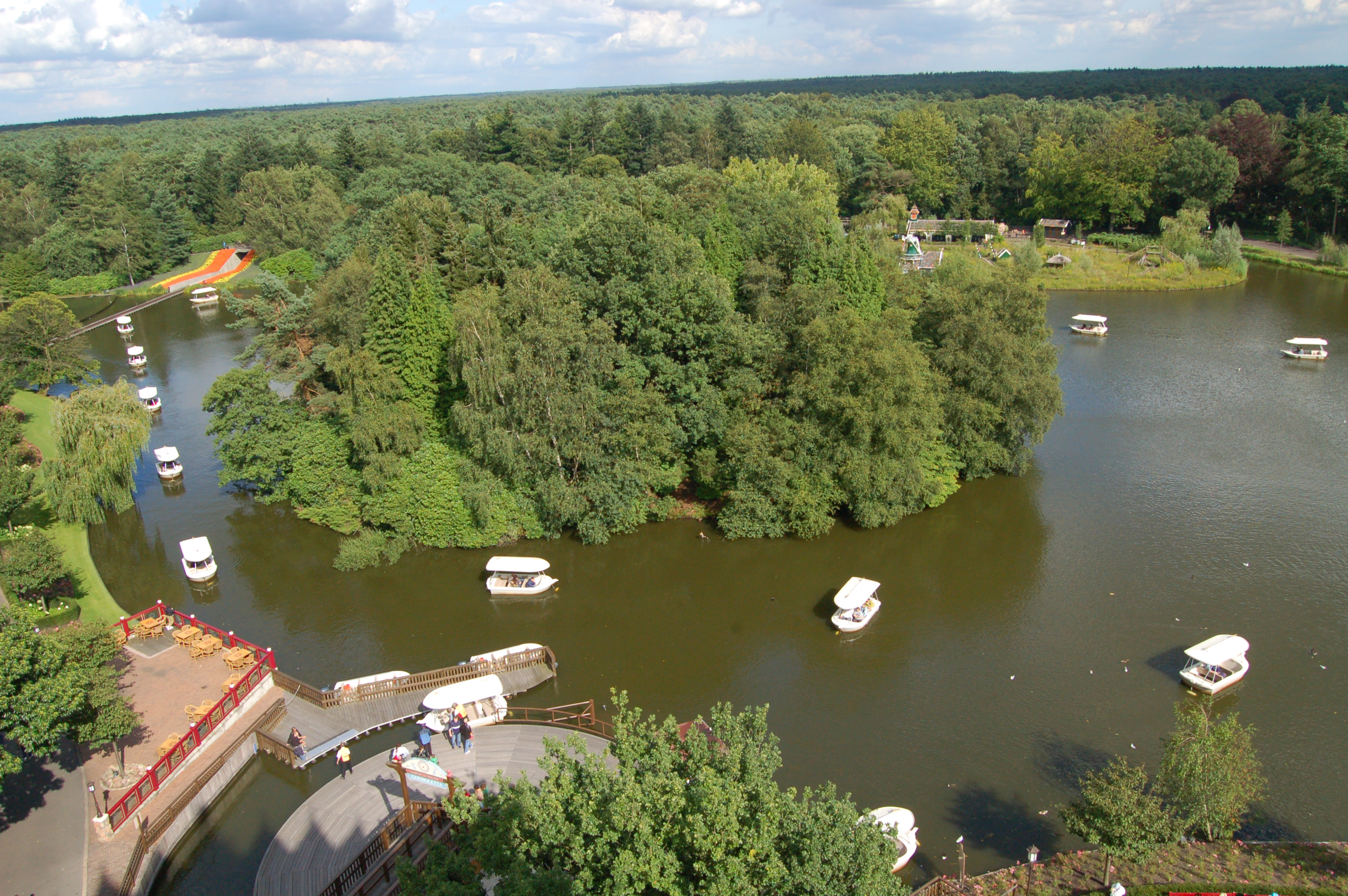
View from the Pagoda

Gondoletta is the attraction with the strongest connection to the roots of the Foundation Nature Park the Efteling. With the destruction of a large part of the Dutch economy during the Second World War the rampant unemployment of the time forced the government to institute New Deal –like employment programs.
In the case of Kaatsheuvel, the local employment agency formed a joint- venture with The Royal Dutch Moor Company' (or " Koninklijke Nederlandsche Heidemaatschappij" in Dutch); the part of the company involved with land reclamation and development still exists today under the name Arcadis.
The development of the nature park started in 1950 with the construction of a lake; connected to a decorative ponds with a channel, forests and recreation facilities.
For the construction of Gondoletta the channel had to be diverted to create a closed circuit; it no longer connects to the canoe -pond but curves back to the Decorative Pond.

The ride's boarding platform uses a rotating disk, a system later implemented in Carnival Festival, Fata Morgana and Piraña.
The boats themselves were originally designed for Fata Morgana, the ride that opened in 1986 on another water location in the park.

The ride shows the park's spectacular landscaping, passing through the Channel and the Decorative Pond (harbouring a large population of Basses, Pike Perches and Carpses) up to the Railroad Bridge of the Efteling Steam Train Company (which crosses the pond at ground level): 50,000 square meters of seasonal plants, like 200,000 tulips, 50,000 violets and hundreds of thousands of Begonias, Narcissuses, African daisy, Rhododendrons, Begonias, Busy Lizzies, Pelargonium geraniums, and Lobelias, amongst others, are planted on the banks of the forests of pine, conifer and deciduous trees and ferns.
Some 150 different species of water birds have been sighted, most noticeably Black swans, Mandarin ducks, Mallards, Egyptian geese, Moorhens, Coots, Black-headed gulls and Grey herons

Ride length: 20 minutes; 1000 meters
Ride capacity: 40 boats; 1100 passengers/ hour
Cost: €2 million

On one of the ride's islands, that connects the Brink with the Rough Realm using bridges, a Wishing well is located since 1985 that collects money for the foundation Save the Children. In the well a small fish pushes a gold plate around; if one throws a coin on the dish a wish may be made. Since then €130,000 has been collected from the well (in 2006 almost €6,000).

== Music ==
The softly playing music in the boats is harp concert Allegro Brillante (11 minutes) from François-Adrien Boieldieu from his Concerto pour Harpe et Orchestre en ut majeur Op.82 (1801). The same music can be heard at the Little Mermaid.
