= Firma Ruhe =

German exotic-animal traders

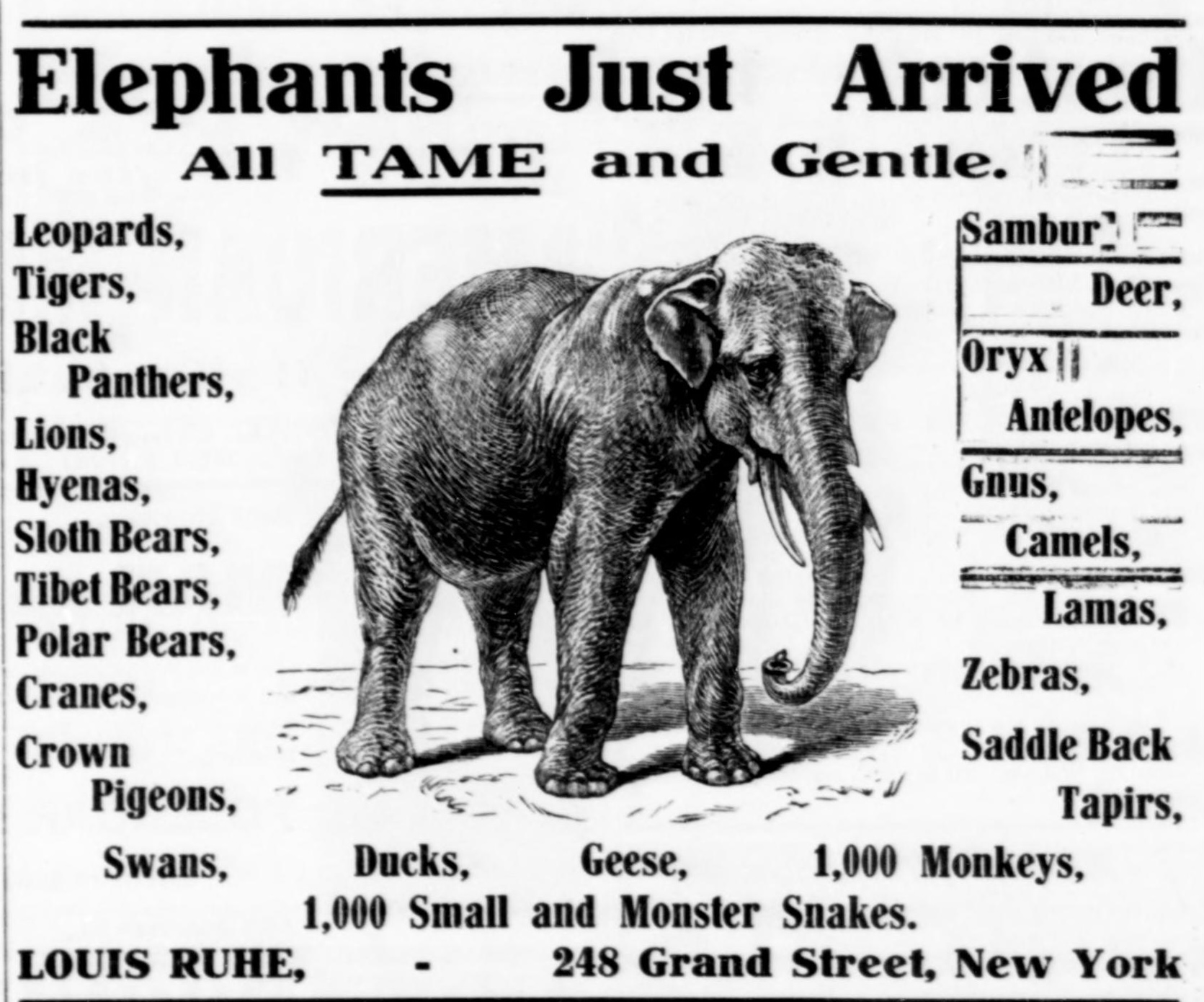
"Elephants just arrived" (Billboard, 1907)

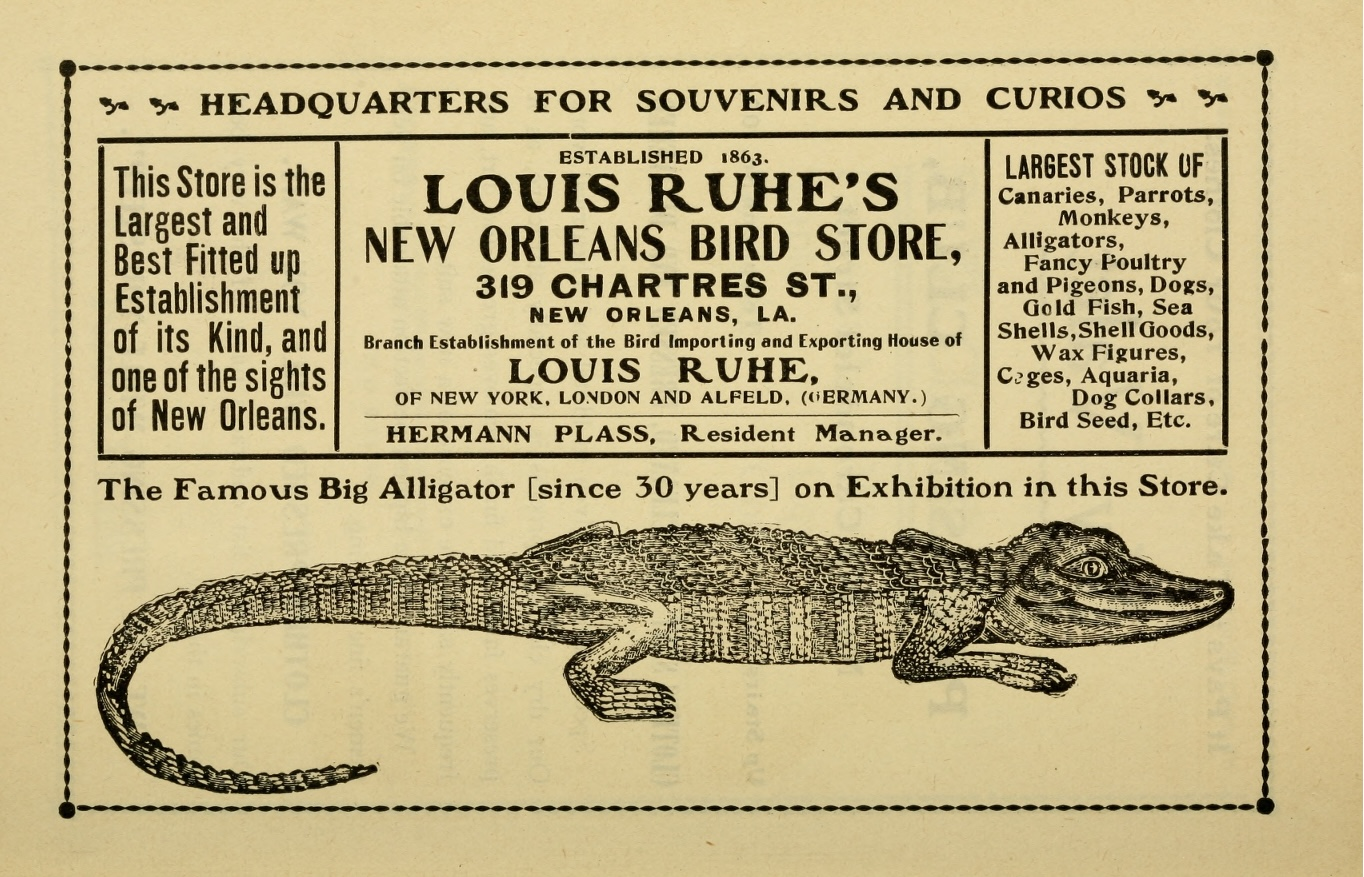
Louis Ruhe, New Orleans, 1902

Firma Ruhe or Louis Ruhe (German: Tierhandelsfirma L. Ruhe; "pet trade company of L. Ruhe") was a multinational, multigenerational family business dealing in wild animals for zoos and circuses. According to Bernard Ruhe of Long Island in 1927, the firm was founded by Louis Ruhe in Germany in 1780. According to another account, Ludwig Ruhe started the firm in 1830. It may have originally dealt in birds sold at local markets and carnivals.

The German operation may have been located in Alfeld with port access at Hanover. The company also had a 1,500-acre farm in Arusha, Tanganyika Territory (now Tanzania) for "collecting new stock." Overseas, an American outlet was established in New York in 1869. There was also a London office.

According to one 1940 news report, Firma Ruhe sold 75 percent of the wild animals imported into the United States; pandas cost $10,000, baby gorillas were $4,000, and pythons were sold by the foot ($5 per). Circa 1946, Time magazine described it as a $3 million a year business. Before World II, the firm had 20 "agents abroad," after the war they were starting back with six. (The firm had a veteran collector in India named Meems.) A 1959 fire at the firm's Long Island, New York holding facility killed five Galápagos tortoises, seven mandrills, and 28 Guenon monkeys. Two baby Western lowland gorillas survived.

Firma Ruhe was involved in operating and maintaining Hanover Municipal Zoo. Another Ruhe-operated zoo, Ruhr-Zoo (now ZOOM Erlebniswelt Gelsenkirchen) was located at Gelsenkirchen in the Ruhr area of North Rhine-Westphalia.
