= ZOOM Erlebniswelt Gelsenkirchen =

- Interactive map of ZOOM Erlebniswelt Gelsenkirchen
- 51°32′39″N 7°6′39″E
- Date opened: 1949 as "Ruhr-Zoo"
- Location: Bleckstr. 64, 45889 Gelsenkirchen
- Land area: 31 hectares (about 77 acres)
- No. of animals: ca. 560
- No. of species: 64
- Major exhibits: Africa, Alaska and Asia
- Website: zoom-erlebniswelt.de

ZOOM Erlebniswelt Gelsenkirchen, founded on April 14, 1949, as "Ruhr-Zoo", is one of the most modern zoological gardens in Germany. It was founded on a heavily shelled area in Gelsenkirchen adjacent to a port on the Rhine–Herne Canal. It initially encompassed 15.5 hectares. During its first years, there was a large turnover of animals as an animal trader, Firma Ruhe, provided them.

Today the park is owned by the city of Gelsenkirchen via GEW – Gesellschaft für Energie und Wirtschaft mbH (society for energy and business), a holding of municipally owned concerns.

After 2004 the park was enlarged to the present size.

It is known for its panoramas and cultural approach. The main attractions are big animals, mostly mammals; the zoo has no aquarium house, insectarium or other facilities for smaller animals.

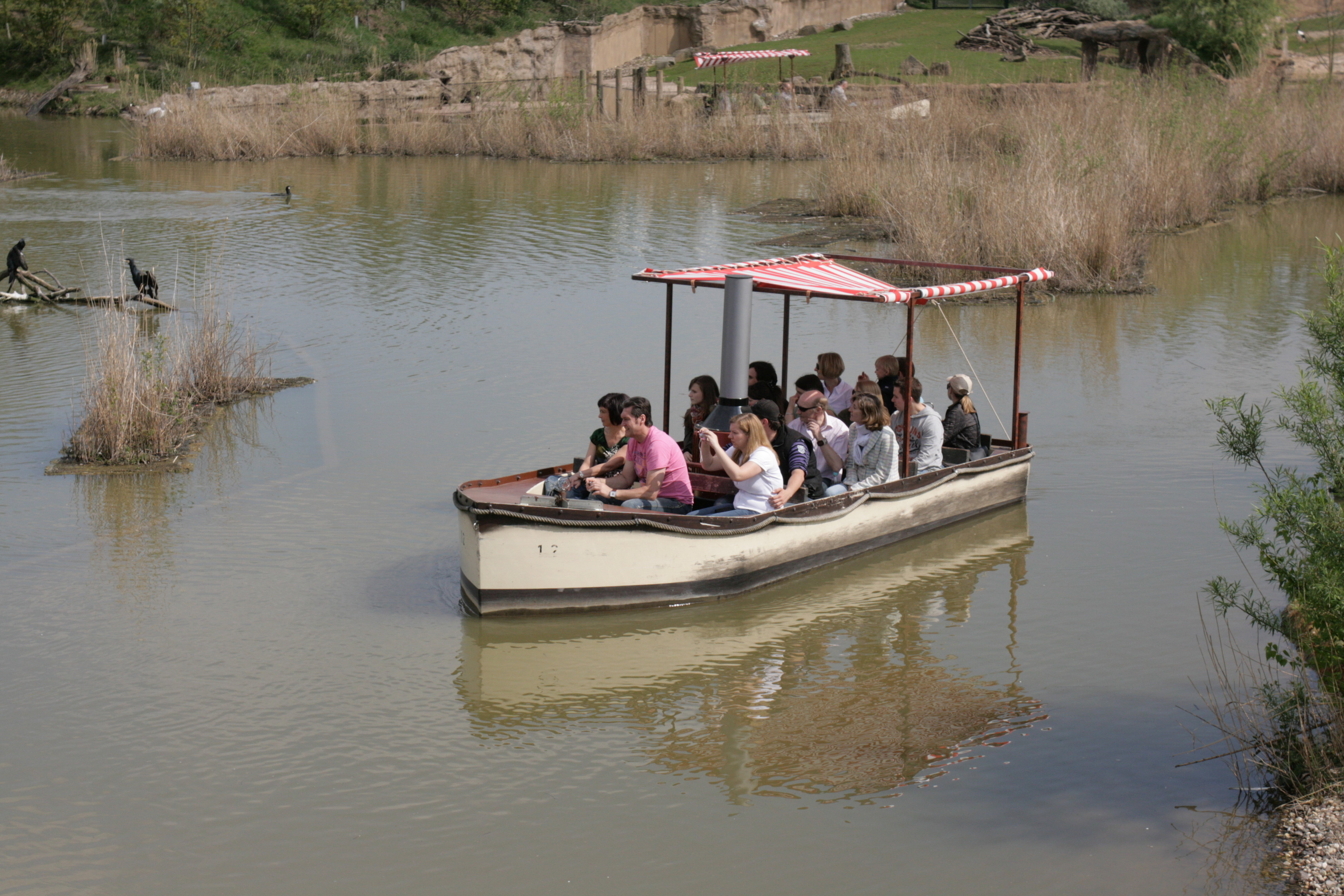
African Queen, Afrika at ZOOM Erlebniswelt in Gelsenkirchen

visitors annually
before 2005	2006	2007	2008	2009	2010	2011
approx. 250,000	approx. 750,000	approx. 1,000,000	approx. 900,000	approx. 850,000	approx. 1,050,000	approx. 902,000

The numbers before 2005 reflect average visitor numbers for the old Ruhr-Zoo.

== Concept and layout ==
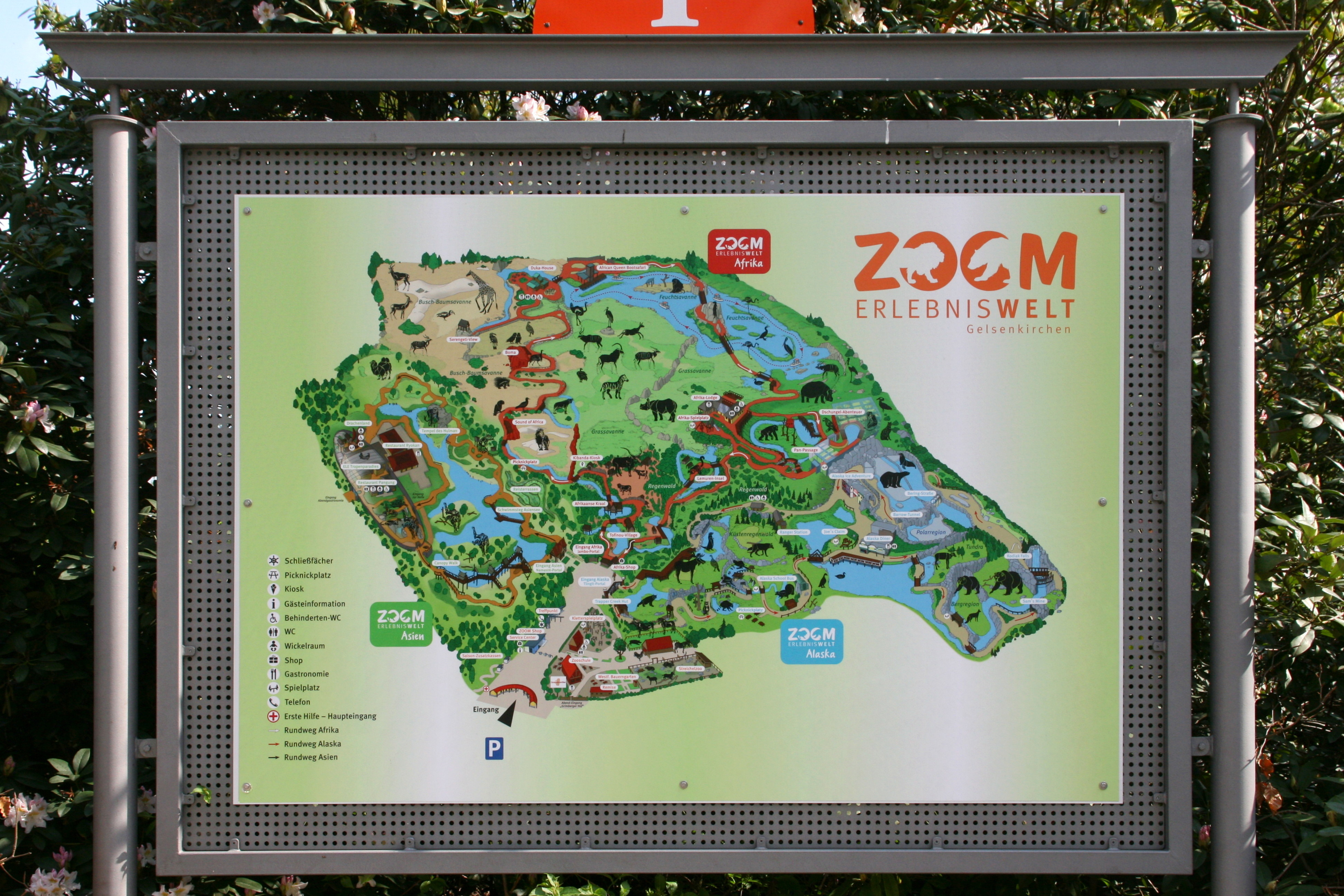
Map of the park

The entrance area resembles the character of a Westphalian farm and is called Grimberger Hof (opened 2004). Its yard offers access to the three separate areas of the park. These are called "safaris" and titled Alaska (opened 2005), Afrika (opened 2006) and Asien (opened 2010).

All Safaris are accessible through gates in a matching style with a shop delivering related paraphernalia.

=== Grimberger Hof ===
The entrance area is designed as a farm and features: some rare species of domesticated animals, a restaurant, a playground, a shop for memorabilia and a petting zoo.

==== Animals ====
- Bentheimer Landschaf
- Bielefelder Kennhuhn
- Bunte Deutsche Edelziege (German improved fawn)
- Danish Protest Pig
- Donkey
- Guinea pig
- Hinterwälder
- Shetland pony

=== Alaska ===
It mainly features nearctic ecozone wildlife with the likes of polar bears, mooses and Californian sea lions. It has a tunnel under a water-filled basin and beavers in a landscaped habitat.

The area is decorated with American road signs, a school bus, a cave resembling a gold mine and other touristy features. Additionally, there is another open-air restaurant and a simulator ride with an animated floor gives the illusion of riding an igloo on an ice floe.

==== Animals ====
- North American beaver
- North American porcupine
- Eastern wolf
- Polar bear
- Brown bear
- Eurasian brown bear
- California sea lion
- Raccoon
- Striped skunk
- North American river otter
- Reindeer
- Moose
- Canada goose
- Snowy owl

=== Africa ===
This safari features most of the popular big animals from Sub-Saharan Africa. Lions and zebras can be seen within the same panorama. A lake with flamingos, a rocky landscape for monkeys and an area with hippos (which are separated from the visitors using invisible underwater fences) can be traversed via a tow boat ride called the African Queen.

Besides wild animals, the entrance area displays some domesticated forms like Ankole-Watusi.

This area features another open-air restaurant and a big playground.

==== Animals ====
- African domesticated animals: Ankole-Watusi, Blackheaded Somali, West African Dwarf goat
- Bush and tree savannah: Cape porcupine, Transvaal Lion, Spotted hyena, Rothschild's giraffe, Nyala, Bontebok, Impala, Vulturine guineafowl, Double-spurred spurfowl, Spotted thick-knee, Laughing dove, Senegal parrot, Black-cheeked lovebird, Von der Decken's hornbill, Abyssinian ground hornbill
- Grass savannah: Plains zebra, White rhinoceros, Greater kudu, Common eland, Sable antelope, Springbok, Common ostrich, Griffon vulture, Marabou stork
- Wet savannah: Olive Baboon, Meerkat, Hippopotamus, Sitatunga, White-faced whistling duck, Greater flamingo, Lesser flamingo, Great cormorant, Saddle-billed stork, Pink-backed pelican
- Tropical rainforest: Egyptian fruit bat, Senegal bushbaby (since 2007 without breeding), Moustached guenon, Western chimpanzee, Serval, Hamerkop, Grey parrot, Ball python
- Lemur island: Ring-tailed lemur, Red ruffed lemur, Black-and-white ruffed lemur

=== Asia ===
Asia features mainly a big hall with tropical climate, home of: orangutans, grey langurs, flying foxes, orchids, palm trees and more. It also includes a big indoor playground and a restaurant with Asian cuisine.

Further attractions are a monkey palace, Bactrian camels and (displayed since summer 2013) Siberian tigers.

==== Animals ====
- Kalong
- Northern plains grey langur
- Southern pig-tailed macaque
- Sumatran orangutan
- Red panda
- Asian small-clawed otter
- Binturong
- Siberian tiger
- Bactrian camel
- Crested partridge
- Demoiselle crane
- Victoria crowned pigeon
- Pied imperial pigeon
- Red-whiskered bulbul
- Red-billed leiothrix
- Java sparrow
- Brahminy starling
- Asian leaf turtle
- Chinese pond turtle
- Amboina box turtle
- Chinese water dragon

== Records ==
- On 31 March 2020, the hippopotamus Ernie celebrated his 50th birthday. At that age, he is the oldest hippopotamus bull in Germany. Ernie was born in Karlsruhe but has lived in Gelsenkirchen since 1971. The two female hippos Asita and Susi live in the rainforest hall and an area at Africa lake.
- The hippopotamus Rosi, which weighed more than two tons, was the oldest hippopotamus in Germany. She celebrated her 50th in 2008 and lived in ZOOM since 1981. Since then, she gave birth to twelve hippos. On 24 April 2012, Rosi died at the age of 53 years.
