= Hanover Zoo =

Zoo in Hanover, Germany

Erlebnis-Zoo Hannover (Hannover Adventure Zoo)
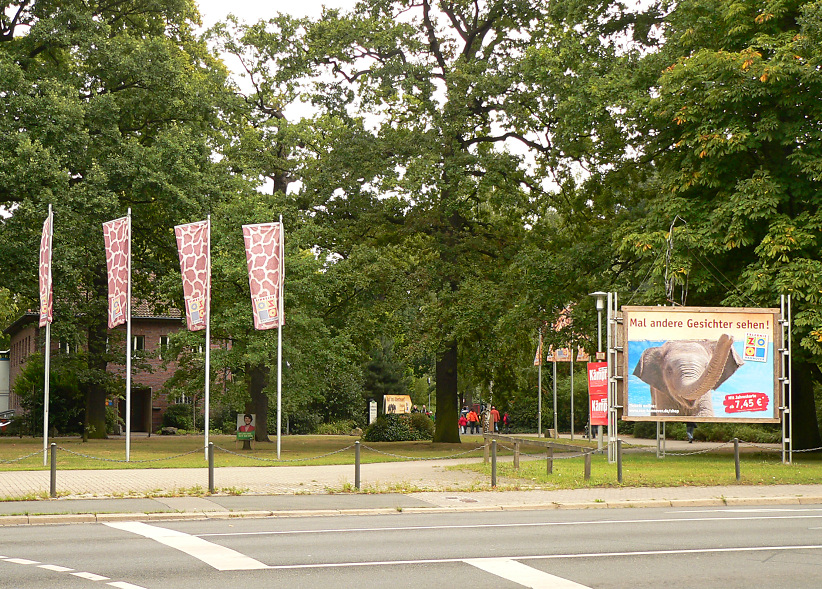
- Entrance to the Hanover Zoo
- Interactive map of Erlebnis-Zoo Hannover (Hannover Adventure Zoo)
- 52.380537°N 9.771062°E
- Date opened: 4 May 1865
- Location: Zoo Quarter, Mitte, Hanover, Germany
- Land area: 22 ha (54 acres)
- No. of animals: 3414 (2010)
- No. of species: 237 (2010)
- Annual visitors: 1,600,000 (2010)
- Memberships: EAZA, WAZA
- Website: www.zoo-hannover.de

Hanover Zoo is located in the Mitte borough of Hanover, Germany. The zoo was established on 4 May 1865, and comprises an area of 22 hectares (54 acres). It contains about 3,414 animals in 237 species, which are cared for by more than 400 employees in the summer season.

== History ==
Hanover Zoo is the fifth-oldest German zoo. It was established in 1865 with private money. To cover expenses, a stock company was founded. Without any experience in the keeping of wild animals, the company faced significant difficulties and, as a result, losses. It was often visited by local residents.

Due to the consequences of World War I, ever increasing subsidies by the government were needed to keep the zoo open. In 1920, the city took over, but in 1922, when the zoo was no longer financially viable, it was closed. Two years later, in 1924, due to public pressure and private commitment by the animal trading company Firma Ruhe, it was re-opened with a lions' canyon and monkey rock. In 1932, Ruhe completely took over the zoo and used it as a showcase for their pet shop. Often, the animals were only exhibited for a few weeks before they were sold.

During World War II, the zoo was badly damaged. In 1946, Ruhe restored parts of the zoo provisionally and few animals could be seen until the reopening in 1950. As time passed and with funding from the municipal budget, new enclosures were built for rhinos, elephants, giraffes, antelopes, seals, and penguins. At this time, Hanover Zoo was renowned for its elephant breeding program: 10 Asian and 3 African elephants were born. In 1972, the zoo was again taken over by the city of Hanover.

=== Concept Zoo 2000 ===
In the early 1990s, the zoo had continuously falling visitor numbers. In 1994, it was converted into a limited company and sold to Hanover Region and work on a new concept started the next year. €111.9 million has since been invested in the zoo's development.

Since 2000, more than a million people have visited the zoo annually. In 2005, the Winter-Zoo was introduced, in 2007, the children's paradise Mollywoop was opened, in spring 2010, the Australian Outback and in May 2010, the seventh theme world followed. A Canadian theme world "Yukon Bay" was opened, a world record of five Asian baby elephants were born in one calendar year at the zoo, and it received the 2009/10 ‘Best Zoo’ award. More than 1.6 million people visit every year.

== Theme worlds ==
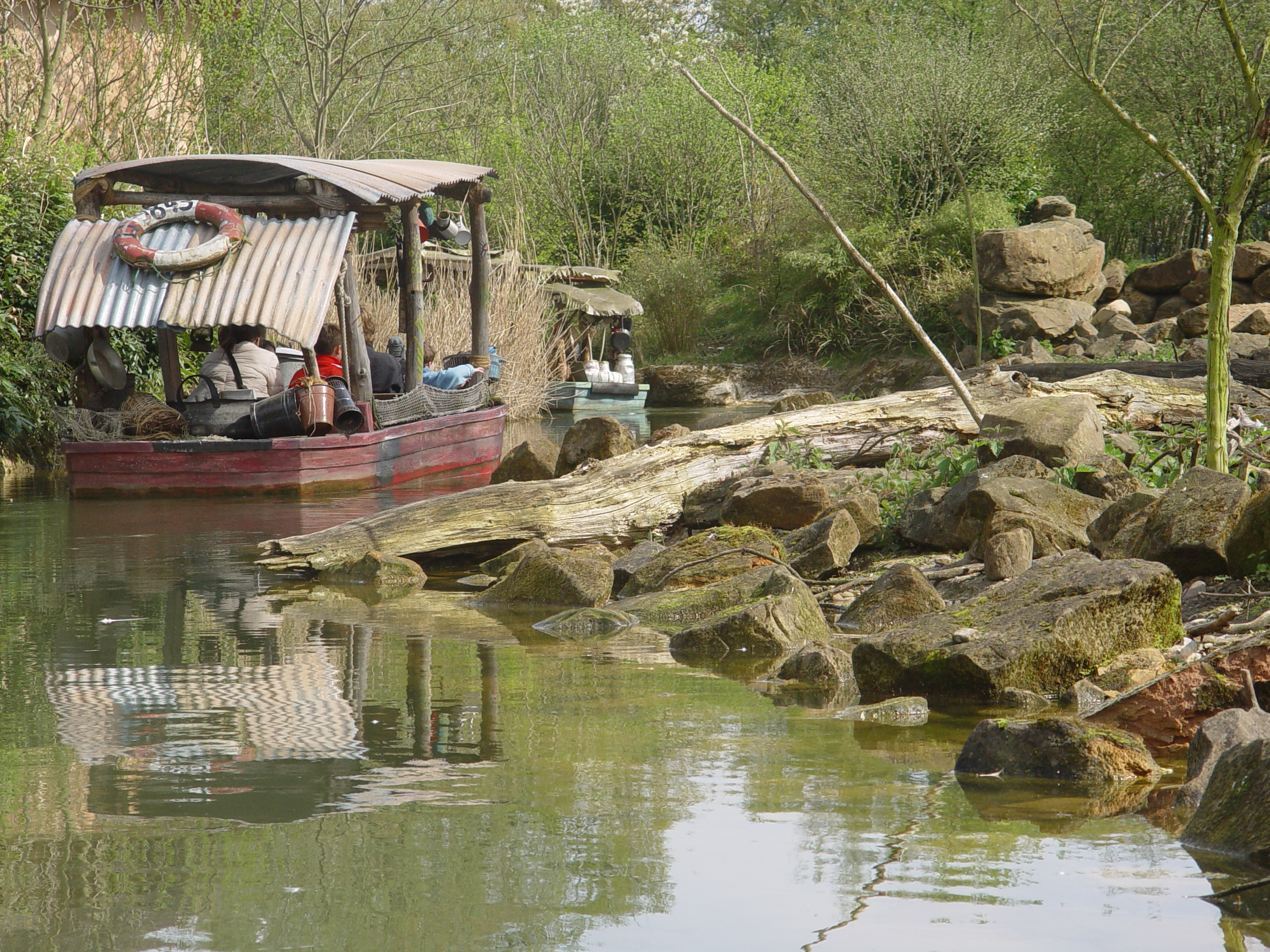
Zambezi tow boats on the artificial river

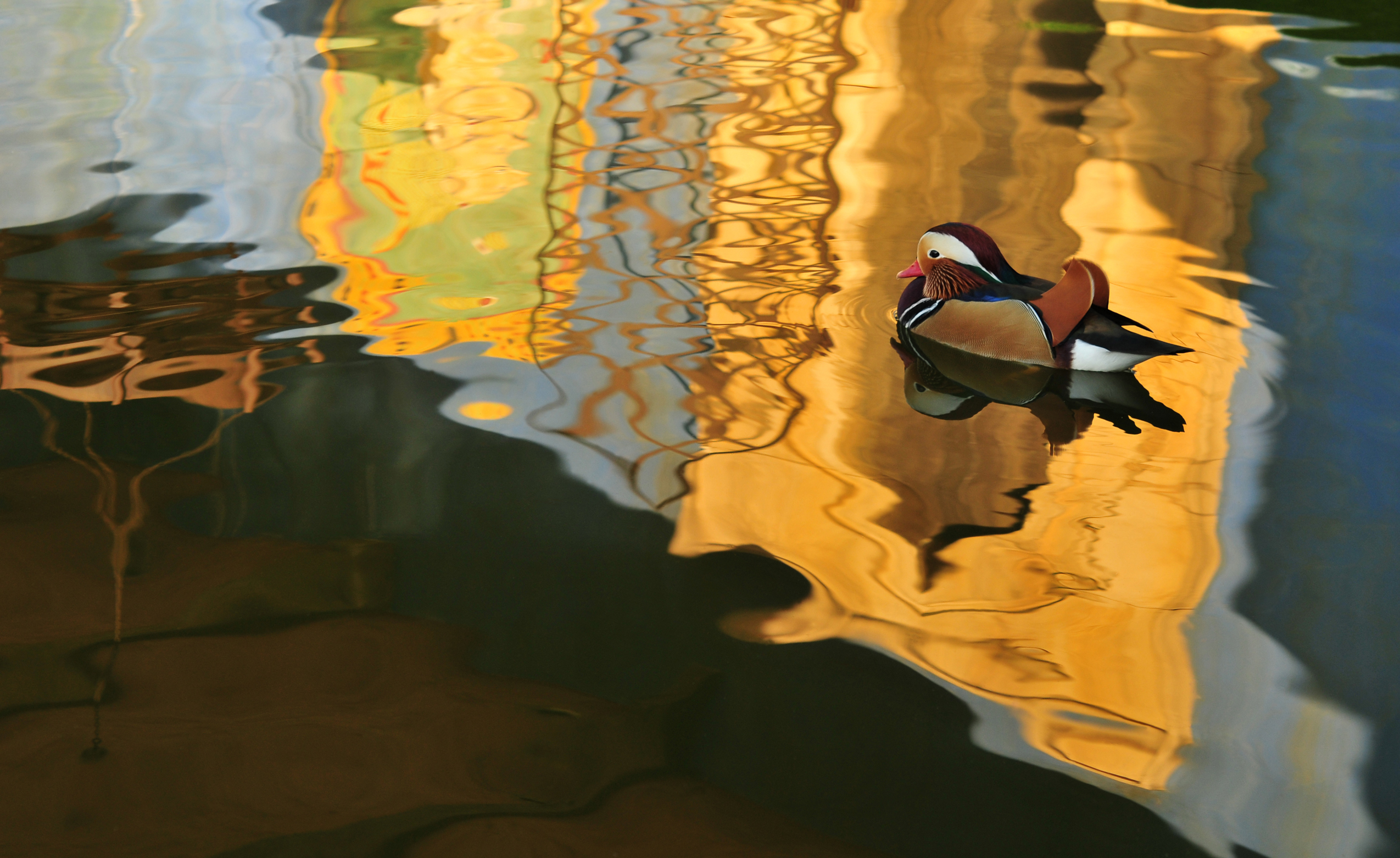
A mandarin duck and with the Jungle Palace mirrored in the lake

The different zoo worlds show animals in scenic settings, without visible barriers. A 5-kilometre-long (3.1 mi) explorer path leads through the different exhibits:

- Zambezi: Zambezi recreates the African savannah. An artificial river runs alongside the giraffes, rhinoceros, flamingos and other animals living in this part of the zoo. Starting at the trading post with on-foot views of the aforementioned animals, visitors travel in small boats for about ten minutes down the river before continuing on foot to the lion, hippo, flamingo, and pelican, meerkat and Sahara desert hoofstock exhibit. At the "Sahara Conservation Visitor Center", there is information on the zoo's addax reintroduction project.
- Gorilla Mountain: On the highest point of the zoo, at the end of the evolution trail featuring dioramas of early humans and an abandoned research camp, gorillas inhabit a forest landscape including a stream and a waterfall. At the foot of the mountain exhibit the gibbons, smallest of the apes, live on an island. The exhibit also includes chimpanzees, other apes, and a sloth.
- Yukon Bay: An old mine shaft leads to the Canadian theme world Yukon Bay, where wolves, caribous, prairie dogs, and bisons are visible. In the harbour, Henry's Underwater World in the hull of the sunken "Yukon Queen" allows views of diving polar bears, seals, and penguins. Yukon Bay was built in collaboration with the Yukon Territory (Canada).
- Jungle Palace: An Indian rainforest exhibit themed as an abandoned Hindu temple with Asian elephants, tigers, leopards, hanuman langurs, and snakes.
- Outback: There is an exhibit themed as an Outback farm featuring kangaroos, wombats, emus, wallabies, and a flock of Australian birds in an aviary themed as a pub.
- Mullewapp (Mollywoop): Mullewapp is an exhibit aimed at children with a petting meadow, secret biology room, and toboggans. It is the location of meet and greets with the "Three Friends" by author Helme Heine.
- Meyer's Farm: Seven old Lower Saxony half-timbered buildings dating back to the 19th century and earlier, re-erected in the zoo, create the setting for Meyer's Farm and are used to house rare old domestic breeds like red and white Husum protest pigs, Pomeranian rough-wool sheep, and Exmoor ponies.
- Winter-Zoo (seasonal): During the Christmas season, the theme worlds Meyer's Farm, Mollywoop, and Yukon Bay are decorated. Activities available in this season include ice-skating, ice curling, roundabouts, and tobogganing.

== Conservation ==
Hanover Zoo is also involved in conservation efforts through multiple programs:

- Projects in collaboration with the Sahara Conservation Fund: the Hanover Zoo is involved in a European breeding project for the North African Ostrich and the Addax, also participating in the reinsertion of both species of animal in their natural habitat in North Africa. The project is done in partnership with the Sahara Conservation Fund and many other zoological parks and centers in the world.
- Polar Bear International: the Hanover Zoo is funding the tracking of a polar bear near the Hudson Bay in Canada since 2008 to better study the comportment and migration route of the animals and better help in their conservation through the Polar Bear International organisation.
- Rettet den Drill eV or Save the Drills: Hanover Zoo is working with Rettet den Drill to save drills populations of Nigeria and Cameroun. The American organisation Pandrillus also provides support in their endeavor to both protect the species and breed animals populations in zoos.
- Protection of the Asian Elephant with the Biodiversity and Elephant Conservation Trust: the Hanover Zoo is working with BECT, an NGO from Sri Lanka, in order to protect the Asian Elephant and educate the populations about the situation of the animal. The zoo also has a successful breeding program for the Asian elephant.
- Conservation of old and endangered breeds: the Hanover Zoo also participate in the conservation of European endangered breeds of domestic and farm animals in partnership with the Gesellschaft zur Erhaltung alter und gefährdeter Haustierrassen e.V. or GEH. In their efforts of participation, the zoo raises many of these breeds in their petting zoo, helping to conserve the genetic diversity of European livestock. Amongst other, the zoo has Harzer Rotvieh cattles, Thuringian goats, German Black Pied cattles, Pomeranian Coarsewool sheep, German faverolle chicken, and many others.
