= Marie Roemaet Rosanoff =

Belgian-American cellist

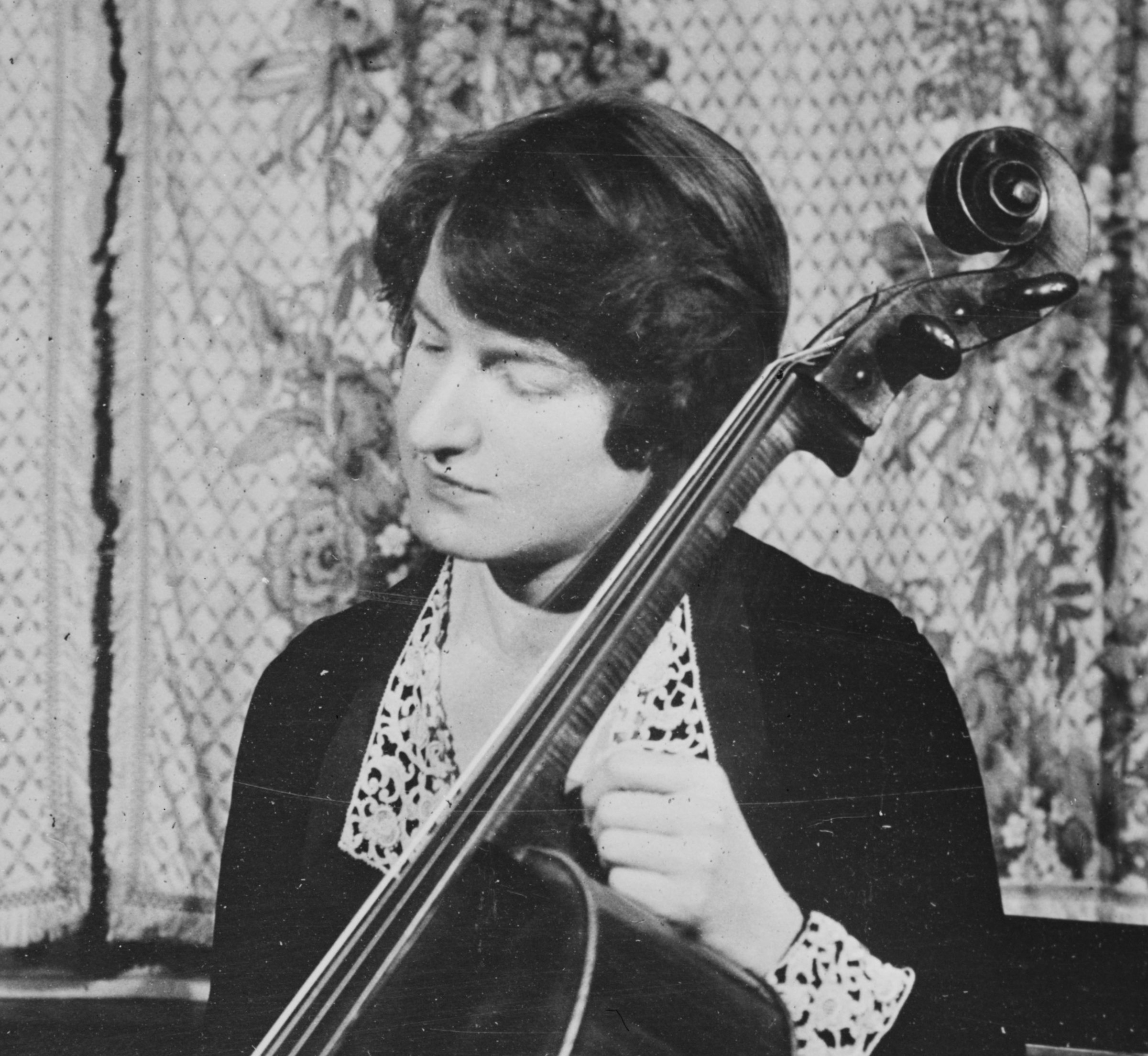
- Born: December 3, 1896; New Jersey, U.S.
- Died: December 24, 1967 (aged 71); New York, New York, U.S.
- Occupations: Cellist, music educator

Marie L. Roemaet Rosanoff (December 3, 1896 – December 24, 1967), sometimes written as Marie Roemaet-Rosanoff or Marie Roemaet-Rosanov, was a Belgian-American cellist and music educator. She was a member of the Musical Art Quartet, with Sascha Jacobsen, Paul Bernard, and Louis Kievman.

== Early life and education ==
Roemaet was born in New Jersey, the daughter of Charles M. Roemaet and Clementine Roemaet. Her father was a Belgian diplomat based in New York City. Her older sister Marguerite was a violinist. She studied at the Institute of Musical Art with Willem Willeke, with further studies under Pablo Casals.

== Career ==
In 1917, Roemaet Rosanoff was a member of the Edith Rubel Trio, with violinist Edith Rubel and pianists Brenda Putnam and Kay Swift. and she taught at the Music School Settlement after her husband was drafted into World War I. She gave a recital at New York's Aeolian Hall in 1925. "Her grace notes, runs, arpeggios and cadenzas were especially good," noted The New York Times, "and her sentiment for the classics was free from affectation." She was a member of the Musical Art Quartet from 1926 to 1944, and made several recordings with the quartet between 1927 and 1930.

She gave a recital "marked by sound musicianship, an admirable sense of style, and meticulous attention to phrasing and detail" at the Town Hall in 1948. In 1951 Roemaet Rosanoff performed at an event marking the 25th anniversary of Franz Kneisel's death. She taught at Kneisel Hall's summer program after it reopened in 1953. She and her husband held a summer cello school in Wilton, Connecticut, in the late 1950s. Stephen Kates was one of her students. In 1964, the Rosanoffs won the Piatigorsky Recognition Award from the Violoncello Society.

== Personal life ==
In 1917, Roemaet married Russian-born fellow cellist Lieff Rozanoff (the correct spelling of the first name is Lieff, although the obituary in the New York Times has Lielf). They had a daughter, Lyova. Roemaet Rosanoff died at her home in Manhattan on December 24, 1967, at the age of 71.
