= Kneisel Hall =

American chamber music festival and school

- Named after: Franz Kneisel
- Formation: 1953; 73 years ago
- Founder: Elizabeth Sprague Coolidge
- Type: Classical music
- Location: Blue Hill, Maine
- Coordinates: 44.4199864°N 68.5904712°W
- Artistic Director: Laurie Smukler
- Executive Director: Meredith Amado
- Students: 50 (Young Artist Program)
- Website: www.kneisel.org

Kneisel Hall is an annual chamber music festival and school located in Blue Hill, Maine. The season runs for seven weeks each summer from late June until mid-August. A small faculty works with approximately fifty young artists of collegiate and graduate level at the beginning of their professional careers, concentrating almost exclusively on chamber music for strings and piano. From 1986 until his death in 2015, pianist Seymour Lipkin served as artistic director. The current artistic director is Laurie Smukler.

Kneisel Hall's summer season is marked by weekly chamber music concerts given by the faculty and guest artists, and is punctuated by two series of Young Artists Concerts—one in mid-July, one at the close of the season in August, both free and open to the public—in which the Young Artists perform great works of chamber music.

== History ==
The origins of the festival date back to 1902, when violinist Franz Kneisel first brought his students to his summer home in Blue Hill. Kneisel had built a house overlooking Blue Hill Bay some years before in 1899, when the small town by the sea had attracted a handful of prominent summering musicians who formed the nucleus of the budding “musical colony.” Kneisel and his colleagues in the Kneisel Quartet established a summer teaching tradition that lasted until Kneisel's death in 1926. Students were offered time for individual practice and lessons, chamber music rehearsals, and “ensemble evenings,” performing chamber works. However, by 1922 Kneisel's school had outgrown his home and studio. Felix Kahn, a friend and amateur cellist, built him a large hall on the side of Blue Hill Mountain, a building with a resonant wood interior that has been the center of the festival's activities ever since.

Kneisel's death in 1926 was followed by a long hiatus in summer teaching of classical music in Blue Hill. However, in 1951, the great patron of American chamber music Elizabeth Sprague Coolidge suggested that a festival be held at Kneisel's Blue Hill concert hall to mark the 25th anniversary of its founder's death. Many of Franz Kneisel's most distinguished students participated, including the violinists Sascha Jacobsen, William Kroll, Joseph Fuchs and Lillian Fuchs, and cellists Gerald Warburg and Marie Roemaet Rosanoff. The reunion spurred a full-fledged revival for Kneisel Hall, spearheaded by Kneisel's daughter Marianne Kneisel. The Kneisel Hall Chamber Music School was formally reestablished in 1953 by Marianne, pianist Artur Balsam, violinist Joseph Fuchs, and violist Lillian Fuchs. A tradition of faculty concerts was established, which continues to the present day.

After Marianne Kneisel's death in 1972, cellist Leslie Parnas (1972–84) became Director, followed by violinist Roman Totenberg (1984–86). Pianist and conductor Seymour Lipkin (director 1987–2015), shaped the culture and seriousness of purpose of the institution over his nearly thirty years guiding it. Under his direction, Kneisel Hall became a leading institution in the teaching of chamber music worldwide.

The current artistic director is Laurie Smukler, who, after a year of serving as Interim Director after Lipkin's death, was formally appointed to the post in 2016. Under Smukler's direction, Kneisel Hall has begun a new program, Composers NOW, which aims to bring contemporary chamber music compositions and composers into direct contact with the Young Artists.

== Faculty ==
In recent years, faculty members have included Roman Totenberg, Joel Krosnick, Jane Coop, Seymour Lipkin, and Ieva Jokubaviciute.
