= Samuel Gardner =

American composer and violinist

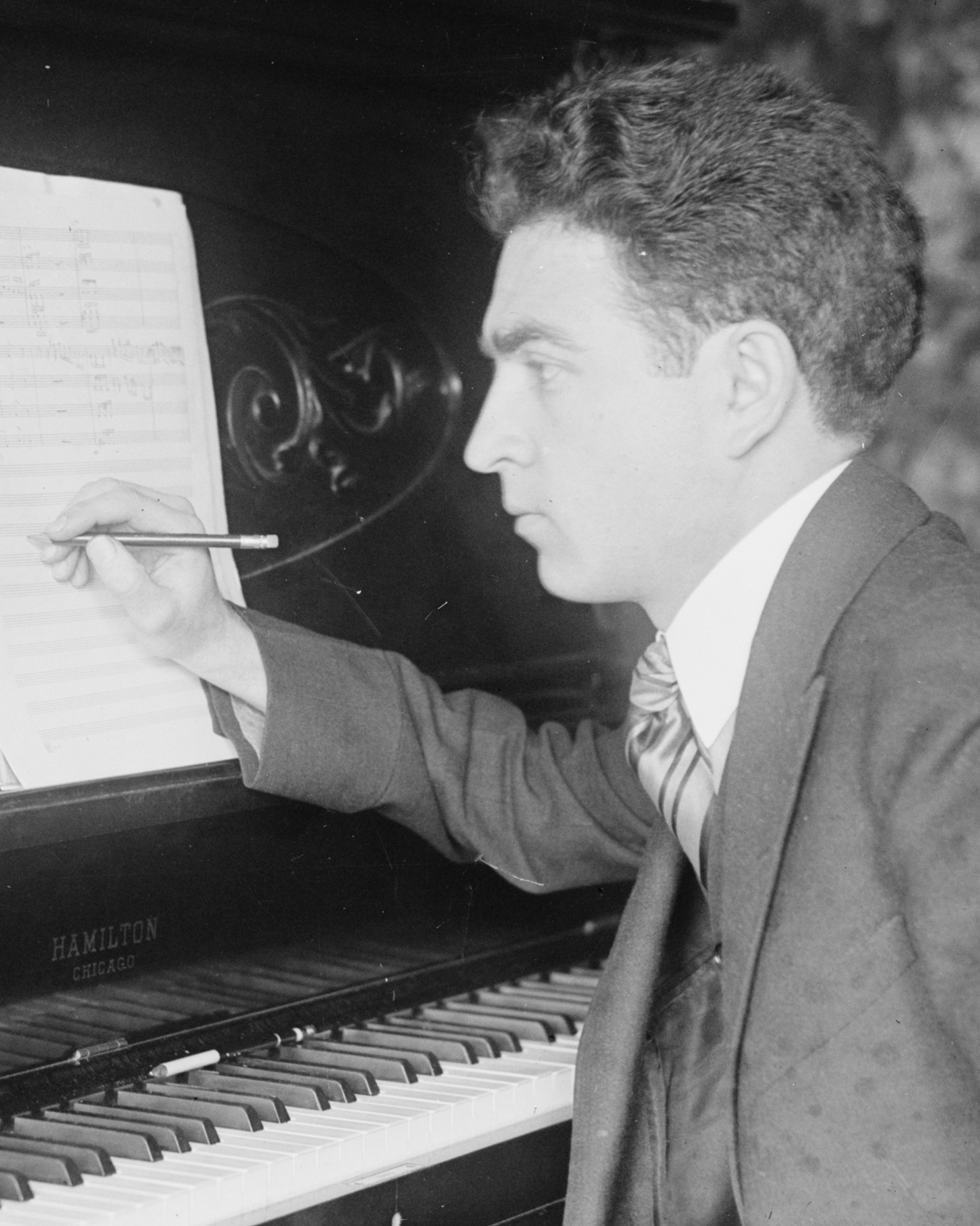
- Samuel Gardner composing at a Hamilton piano between 1915 and 1920

Background information
- Born: August 25, 1891; Elizavetgrad, Kherson Governorate, Russian Empire
- Died: January 23, 1984 (aged 92) Manhattan, New York, USA
- Occupations: Composer and violinist

Samuel Gardner (August 25, 1891, Elizavetgrad – January 23, 1984) was an American composer and violinist of Russian Jewish origin. He won a Pulitzer Prize with a string quartet in 1918. He was a student of Franz Kneisel and Percy Goetschius, and began his career as a concert violinist; among his compositions is a violin concerto. He wrote a number of other chamber works, and a handful of things for orchestra, including Broadway, which was performed by the Boston Symphony in the 1929–30 season.

== Biography ==
Samuel Gardner was born August 25, 1891, in Elizavethgrad, Russian Empire, and was brought to the United States at the age of one. His family settled in Providence, Rhode Island, where Gardner attended elementary and high school. From the age of seven, he studied violin with Felix Wendelschaefer. He continued his studies in Boston with Charles Martin Loeffler and Felix Winternitz from 1902 to 1908. At the New York Institute of Musical Art (1908–1913), Gardner studied violin with Franz Kneisel and composition with Percy Goetschius.

Gardner made his New York debut in 1913, played 2nd violin in the Kneisel Quartet from 1914 to 1915, performed with the Chicago Symphony (several times as soloist) in 1915, and toured with the Elshuco Trio in 1916 and 1917. In addition to solo recitals, Gardner appeared as soloist with the New York Philharmonic under Josef Stránský and Willem Mengelberg, with the Philadelphia Orchestra under Leopold Stokowski, with the St. Louis, Chicago, and Los Angeles Symphonies, and in Germany and Holland. He premiered his own Violin Concerto in 1918 with the Boston Symphony Orchestra under Pierre Monteux.

As a violin teacher, Gardner held appointments at the Institute of Musical Art (now the Juilliard School) from 1924 to 1941. He also taught at Columbia University, the University of Wisconsin, the Hartt School of Music, and the Atlanta School of music. Gardner published a number of pedagogical works which include a method for violin and his Harmonic Thinking school of string playing.

Gardner's conducting appearances included the premiere of his symphonic poem New Russia in 1921 with the Philadelphia Orchestra and the first performance of his Broadway (1924) with the Boston Symphony in 1930. From 1938 to 1939, Gardner conducted for the Federal Music Project in New York, and in 1946 he became the first Conductor and Music Director of the Staten Island Symphony.

Gardner received a prize from the Pulitzer Foundation for his Second String Quartet (1918), the Loeb Prize for a symphonic poem (1918), and an honorary doctorate from the New York College of Music (1939). The composer of many violin works, Gardner was especially renowned for "From the Canebrake," which is still a standard encore piece for violinists.

He died in New York on January 23, 1984.

== Sources ==
- Howard, John Tasker (1939). Our American Music: Three Hundred Years of It. New York: Thomas Y. Crowell Company.
