= Rubel =

Rubel may refer to:

== People ==
=== Surname ===
- Ahmed Rubel (born 1969), Bangladeshi actor
- Aleksandr Rubel (born 1980), Estonian murderer
- Alexander Rubel (born 1969), German-Romanian historian
- Donald C. Rubel (1900–1980), American banker and politician
- Edith Rubel (1884–1952), American violinist
- Edwin Rubel, American otolaryngologist
- Ilana Rubel (born 1972), American politician
- Ira Rubel, inventor of offset printing
- Jane Rubel, basketballer and postal worker
- John H. Rubel (1920–2015), American business executive and public official
- Lee Albert Rubel (1928–1995), American mathematician
- Mahmudul Haque Rubel, Bangladesh politician
- Masum Parvez Rubel (born 1960), Bangladeshi actor, director, producer, and director
- Matthew Rubel (born 1957), American businessman
- Maximilien Rubel (1905–1996), Soviet-born French Marxist
- Robert J. Rubel (born 1946), American author
- Robert Rubel, American football coach
- Samuel Rubel (1881–1949), Russian-born American businessman
- Steve Rubel, American public relations executive and blogger
- Tahounia Rubel (born 1988), Ethiopian-born Israeli fashion model and television personality
- Talia Rubel (born 1979), American actress
- Vadym Rubel (born 1966), Ukrainian historian

=== Given name ===
- Rubel Ahmed (1980s–2014), Bangladeshi immigrant to Britain, who died in an immigration detention centre under controverted circumstances
- Rubel Ahmed (cricketer), Bangladeshi cricketer
- Rubel Brisolla (born 1991), Brazilian singer-songwriter
- Rubel Das, Indian actor
- Rubel Hossain (born 1990), Bangladeshi cricketer
- Rubel Mia (born 1992), Bangladeshi cricketer
- Rubel Miya (born 1995), Bangladeshi footballer
- Rubel Phillips, American politician
- Rubel Rana (born 1983), Bangladeshi swimmer
- Rubel Rana (born 1983), Bangladeshi swimmer
- Rubel Sarsour (born 1983), Arab-Israeli footballer
- Rubel Shelly, author, minister, and professor

=== Nickname ===
- Mosaddek Hossain (cricketer, born 1983), also known as Rubel

== Other uses ==
- Belarusian ruble (or rubel), the currency of Belarus
- Rubel Castle, in Glendora, California

== See also ==
- Karl Rübel (1895–1945), German army general
