= Treaty of Nystad =

1721 peace treaty ending the Great Northern War

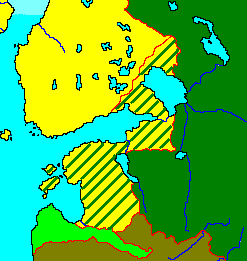
- Treaty effects: pre-war Sweden in yellow, Russia in green, Russian gains indicated by lines.
- Signed: 10 September [O.S. 30 August] 1721
- Location: Nystad, Sweden (Present-day Uusikaupunki, Finland)
- Original signatories: Sweden; Russia

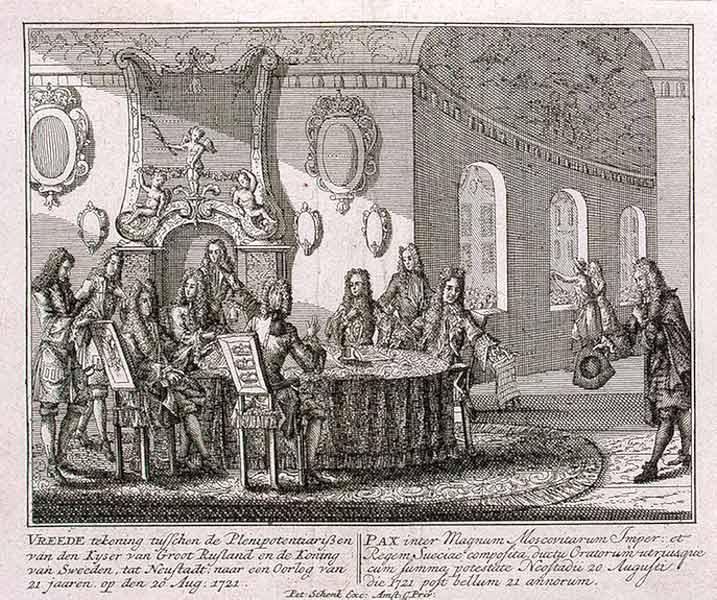
Signing of the Treaty of Nystad

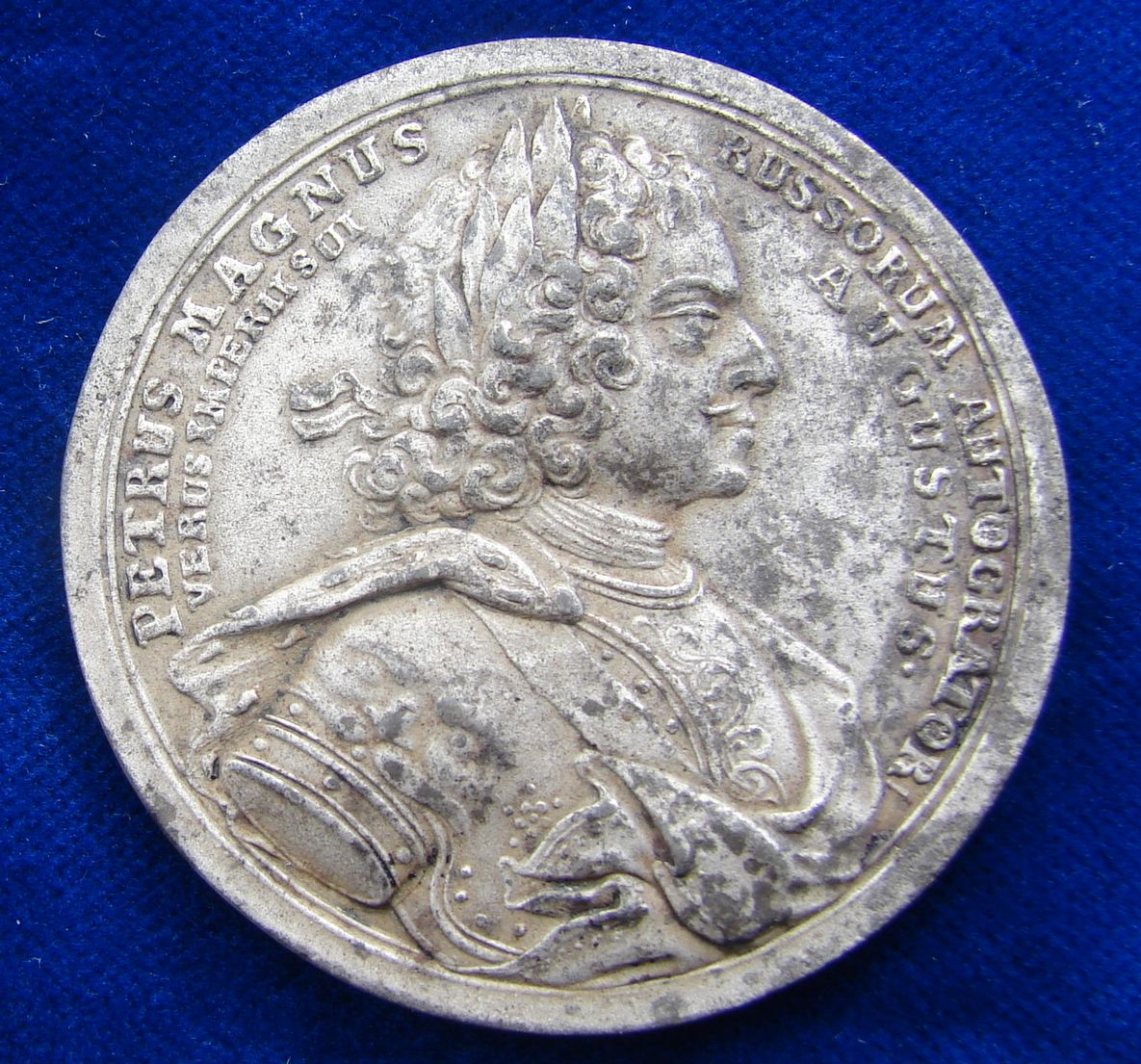
The obverse of an Fe- medal 1721 by the Danish medallist Anton Schultz. "Treaty of Nystad to end the Great Northern War by Peter the Great"

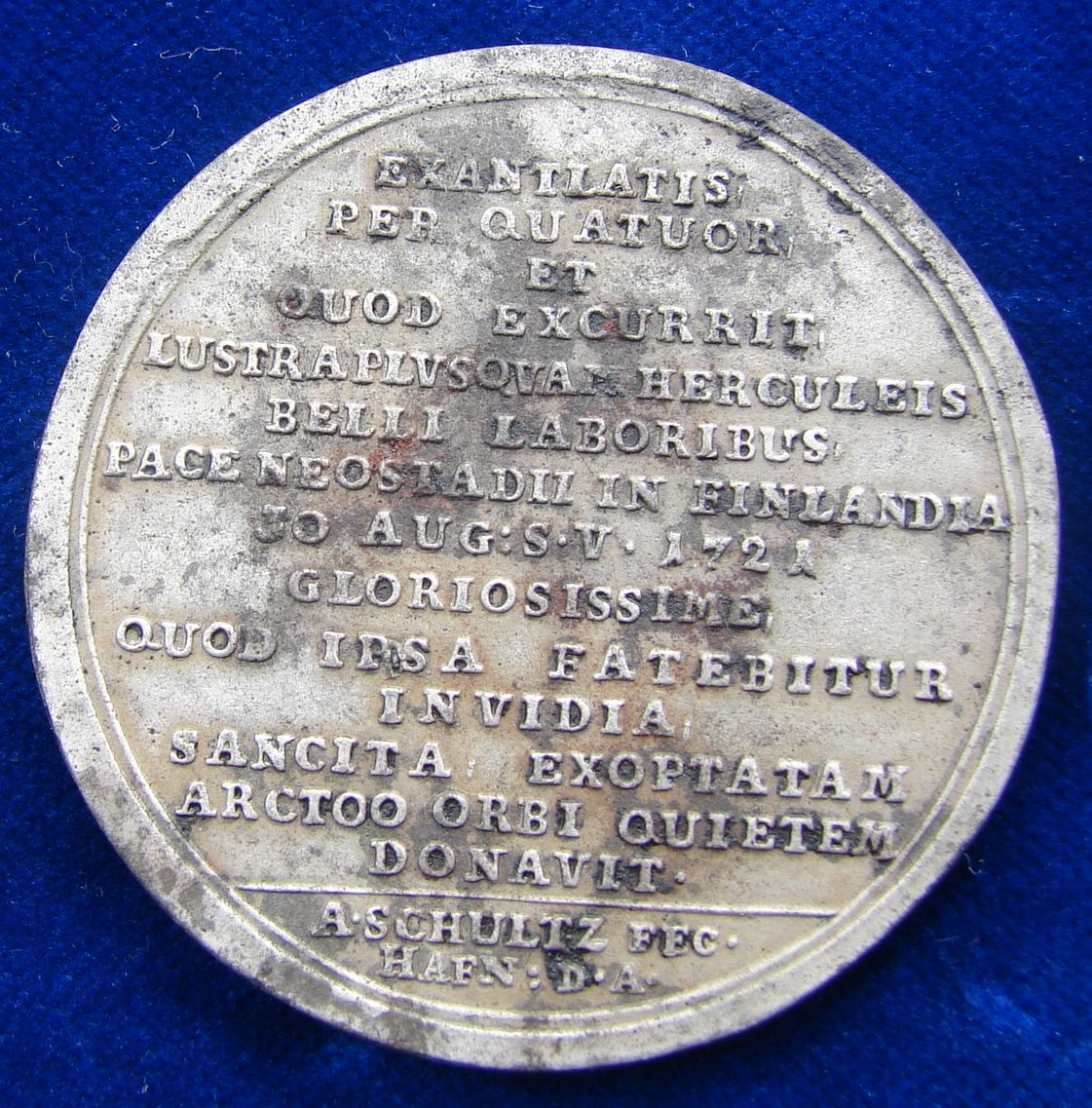
The reverse of the medal

The Treaty of Nystad, or the Treaty of Uusikaupunki, (Note: Russian: Ништадтский мир; Finnish: Uudenkaupungin rauha; Swedish: Freden i Nystad; Estonian: Uusikaupunki rahu) was the last peace treaty of the Great Northern War of 1700–1721. It was concluded between the Tsardom of Russia and the Swedish Empire on 10 September [O.S. 30 August] 1721 in the then Swedish town of Nystad (Uusikaupunki, in the south-west of present-day Finland). Sweden had settled with the other parties in Stockholm (1719 and 1720) and in Frederiksborg (1720).

During the war Peter I of Russia had occupied all Swedish possessions on the eastern Baltic coast: Swedish Ingria (where he began to build the soon-to-be Russian capital of St. Petersburg in 1703), Swedish Estonia and Swedish Livonia (which had capitulated in 1710), and Finland.

In Nystad, King Frederick I of Sweden formally recognized the transfer of Estonia, Livonia and Ingria to Russia, while granted toll-free export of grain from Livonia up to a value of 50 000 rubel annually. In addition, Southeast Finland (Kexholms län and part of Karelian Isthmus) was transferred to Russia in exchange for two million silver riksdaler, while Russia returned the bulk of Finland to Swedish rule which happened within four weeks after the treaty was ratified.

The Treaty enshrined the rights of the ceded territories to maintain their financial system, their existing customs border, their self-government, their Lutheran religion, and for the German Baltic nobility within Estonia and Livonia, the German language; this special position in the Russian Empire was reconfirmed by all Russian Tsars from Peter the Great (reigned 1682-1725) to Alexander II (reigned 1855-1881).

Russia was given the right to mediate the conflicts between Sweden and Poland, while guaranteeing a non-interference policy towards the Swedish crown and succession. Lastly, it was agreed that all prisoners of war on both sides, including civilians, were to be released and allowed to return to respective country after personal debts had been settled or made bail for.

Nystad manifested the decisive shift in the European balance of power which the war had brought about: the Swedish imperial era had ended; Sweden entered the Age of Liberty, while Russia had emerged as a new empire.

== Legacy ==
In pre-1917 Saint Petersburg, in the Vyborgsky district (relatively nearest to Russo-Finnish border) one of the thoroughfares (now Lesnoy prospekt) was named after the Nystad treaty (Nystadt Street, Rus. Ништадтская улица). The district also houses a church commemorating the first Russian victory in the Great Northern war, the Battle of Poltava – St. Sampsonius' Cathedral.

== See also ==
- List of treaties
