= Rubell =

Rubell is a surname. Notable people with the surname include:

- Jennifer Rubell (born 1970), American conceptual artist
- Paul Rubell (born 1952), American film editor
- Steve Rubell (1943–1989), American entrepreneur

== See also ==
- Rubel
