= Artur Balsam =

Artur Balsam (February 8, 1906 – September 1, 1994) was a Polish classical pianist and pedagogue.

== Biography ==
He was born in Warsaw, Poland, and studied in Łódź, making his debut there at the age of 12 then enrolled at the Berlin Hochschule für Musik and studied with Artur Schnabel and Curt Boerner. In 1930 he won the Berlin International Piano Competition and obtained the prestigious Mendelssohn Prize in chamber music the following year with Roman Totenberg. In 1932 he made a tour of the United States with Yehudi Menuhin. With the rise of the Nazis, Balsam settled in New York City, where he became the accompanist of choice for international artists, including Henri Temianka, with whom he performed twice in 1945 at Carnegie Hall, Zino Francescatti, David Oistrakh, Leonid Kogan, Oscar Shumsky, Isaac Stern, Zara Nelsova, Joseph Fuchs, Lillian Fuchs, Michael Rabin, Ida Haendel, Mstislav Rostropovich, Nathan Milstein, Roman Totenberg, among many others. He became the undisputed dean of chamber music performance and teaching in the United States, and also performed occasional solo recitals. He recorded the complete piano works of Mozart for Oiseau-Lyre, and the Haydn sonatas for Musical Heritage Society, for which he also recorded the two-piano and four-hand piano works of Mozart with Nadia Reisenberg, and again with Gena Raps on the Arabesque label. Raps and Balsam also recorded the Dvorak Slavonic dances for two pianos, which was listed as a New York Times ten best of the year. At Mozart's bicentenary in 1956, he was invited to record six of the piano concertos with the BBC Symphony. His recordings of Beethoven's violin sonatas with Joseph Fuchs, and cello sonatas with Zara Nelsova, as well as their recording of Rachmaninov's cello sonata, are among the most prized of this repertoire. He served on the faculties of the Eastman School of Music, Boston University and the Manhattan School of Music. Some of his notable students include Emanuel Ax, Astrith Baltsan, Edmund Battersby, Robert Freeman, Mina Miller, Edmund Niemann, Murray Perahia, Gena Raps, Logan Skelton, Paul-André Bempéchat and Eleanor Wong. He died of pneumonia at Mount Sinai Hospital in Manhattan at the age of 88.

His wife, Ruth Rosalie, served as President of the Artur Balsam Foundation for Chamber Music. She died less than five years later, on April 9, 1999.
