= DIPF =

DIPF may refer to:

- Dublin International Piano Festival, an annual festival in Ireland
- Debtor-in-possession financing, a special form of financing provided for companies in financial distress
- Diisopropyl fluorophosphate, an oily, colorless liquid
- German Institute for International Educational Research (DIPF Leibniz-Institut für Bildungsforschung und Bildungsinformation, a scientific institution in Leibniz Association
