= Jacques de Menasce =

American classical composer

- Born: August 1, 1905; Bad Ischl, Austria-Hungary
- Died: January 28, 1960 (aged 54)
- Education: Vienna Music Academy
- Genres: Classical
- Occupations: Composer, musician, critic
- Instrument: Piano
- Labels: Vanguard Classics, Nimbus Records

Jacques de Menasce (August 19, 1905 – January 28, 1960) was an Austrian classical composer, pianist, and critic and later American, nationality.

== Biography ==
=== Early life ===
Jacques de Menasce was born in Bad Ischl, then in the German-speaking part of the Austro-Hungarian Empire, into a Jewish family with roots in Egypt where they had amassed considerable wealth as merchants and bankers and played prominent roles in the Jewish community that centred in Alexandria. This was also the family from which sprang the Catholic writer Jean de Menasce, who was a first cousin of the composer's father, Henri de Menasce. As a boy Jacques de Menasce's portrait was painted by Oskar Kokoschka.

He studied at the Vienna Music Academy as a young man under teachers who included Joseph Marx, Paul Pisk, and Emil von Sauer, and he was also much encouraged by Alban Berg, at whose instigation he composed his first piano concerto.

=== Career ===
His compositions include two piano concertos, the Sonata for Viola and Piano (championed by Lillian Fuchs), Hebrew Melodies for Violin and Piano, and the song cycles Quatre Chansons, Outrenuit, and Pour une Princesse.

There exist a few recordings of his works. The first, on Vanguard Classics, contains performances of the second piano concerto along with his Divertimento on a Children's Song and the Petite Suite pour le Piano. The conductor is the composer's friend Edmond Appia and the pianist is the composer himself.

There is also a recording issued by Composers Recordings, Inc. (CRI) that contains performances of the viola sonata, the second sonatina for piano, the first violin sonata, and Instantanés, a collection of short piano pieces.

His Deux Lettres d'Enfants appears on a Nimbus recording of Hugues Cuénod singing French song cycles.

There also exists a recording of Jacques de Menasce participating (together with the violinist Ángel Reyes) in a performance of the Sonatine for violin and piano of Henry Barraud.

The composer and Lillian Fuchs performed his Viola Sonata in One Movement for broadcast on WQXR New York on 12 May 1957 (with sonatas by Brahms and Milhaud. While this was not commercially released, a recording was made by Studio 70 New York on two 45-rpm lacquer discs, copies of which are held by Northern Vintage Recordings Archive (catalog not yet published).

- French Wikipedia entry
