= Perolé Quartet =

The Perolé Quartet was a respected American string quartet of the interwar period; the founding members were violinists Joseph Coleman and David Mankovitz, violist Lillian Fuchs, and cellist Julian Kahn. Other musicians who were members of the quartet included George Ockner.

It was founded with financial support from three families, the Pereras, Robesons, and Leventritts, and "Perolé" represents the first letters of the families' names.

The exact dates of the quartet's existence are disputed:

There is some confusion about the years when this quartet was in existence. In a 1949 article on Joseph Fuchs in Saleski's Famous Musicians of Jewish Origin, the following appears on page 339: "His sister, Lillian Fuchs, a gifted violist and composer, became the founder and for 15 years violist of the famed Perolé String Quartet." This information agrees with the first and last dates of Perolé Quartet events (concerts and broadcasts) reported in The New York Times between 1927 and 1942, a period of fifteen years. In an interview with Dennis Rooney ("Traditional Values"), Lillian stated that she "joined the Perolé Quartet in 1925" and the "ensemble played together for 19 and one-half years." To further complicate the data, the entry for Edgar Leventritt in The New Grove Dictionary of American Music states that "his support made possible the founding of the Perolé Quartet in 1925." Leventritt's obituary, however, claims "he was the co-founder of the Perolé Quartet in 1927." See The New York Times (2 June 1939):23.

The quartet was featured in regular Sunday broadcasts on radio station WOR during the 1930s. Mankovitz was replaced as second violinist by Max Hollander in 1933, and Julian Kahn as cellist by Ernst Silberstein in 1937. Coleman's departure in 1942 spelled the end of the quartet, though according to Living Musicians it "was disbanded soon after World War II."

== Sources ==
- Amedee Daryl Williams, Lillian Fuchs: First Lady of the Viola (iUniverse, 2004), ISBN 0-595-30957-7.
