= Ethel Painter Hood =

American sculptor

Ethel Painter Hood (April 9, 1908 (Note: At least one source gives a birthdate of 1906.) – 1982) was an American sculptor.

Prior to becoming a sculptor, Hood had a varied career including stints as a marathon swimmer, writer, musician, and painter. A native of Baltimore, she was the daughter of John Mifflin Hood, Jr., a civil engineer, and Ethel Gilpin Panter, daughter of an inventor and cousin of Howard Pyle. Initially interested in a swimming career – she planned to try out for the Olympics – she traveled to Europe with her family in the summer of 1926, where she took painting lessons at the Académie Julian in Paris and wrote free-lance articles for Vogue. Back home in Baltimore she took up the violin, which led her, after encouragement, to further study in New York; while there she took classes in oil painting at the Art Students League under Ivan Olinsky. Once again returning to Baltimore, she determined upon sculpture as a career. Hood was most interested in portraiture; among those who sat for her were Beatrice Lillie and Helen Hayes. She taught herself principles from a textbook, but also had two years of lessons with Brenda Putnam. Hood's work so impressed Gutzon Borglum that he invited her to work with him in the Black Hills, but she refused.

Hood showed her work throughout the United States during her career, and was a fellow of the National Sculpture Society and the National Association of Women Artists, as well as being named a member of the Fine Arts Commission in 1959. Brookgreen Gardens is among the collections holding examples of her work.
