= Mary Moore (sculptor) =

American sculptor (1881/87–1967)

Mary Ethelwyn Moore (April 28, 1887, or 1881 – 1967) was an American sculptor and teacher born in Taunton, Massachusetts, best known for her fountains, including the Small Child Fountain located in the Boston Public Garden, busts, and relief portraits. She studied sculpture at the school of the Boston Museum of Fine Arts with Bela Pratt, Charles Grafly, and F. E. Elwell and she also taught there and at the Beaver Country Day School.

Among her students was Brenda Putnam.

Moore was a member of the National Sculpture Society and showed at their 1929 exhibition.
