= Katharine Weber =

American novelist and writer (born 1955)

- Born: November 12, 1955 (age 70); New York City, New York, USA
- Spouse: Nicholas Fox Weber (m. 1976)
- Children: 2
- Relatives: Warburg family Kay Swift (grandmother); James Warburg (grandfather)
- Website: Official website

Katharine Weber (born November 12, 1955) is an American novelist and nonfiction writer. She has taught fiction and nonfiction writing at Yale University, Goucher College, the Paris Writers Workshop and elsewhere. She held the Visiting Richard L. Thomas Chair in Creative Writing at Kenyon College from 2012 to 2019.

== Life and work ==
Weber was born in New York City, the daughter of Andrea (née Warburg; 9/29/1922-1/18/2009) and Sidney Kaufman (died 1983). Her maternal grandmother was composer Kay Swift and her grandfather was banker James Warburg. She grew up in the Forest Hills Gardens section of Queens, New York. She attended The Kew-Forest School and Forest Hills High School before attending the Freshman Year Program at The New School for Social Research (now Eugene Lang College at New School University) in 1972.

In 1976, she married Nicholas Fox Weber, cultural historian and Executive Director of The Josef and Anni Albers Foundation and moved to Connecticut. In 1981 and 1983, their two daughters, Lucy and Charlotte, were born.

From 1982 to 1984, Weber attended Yale as a part-time undergraduate.

Since Swift's death in 1993, Weber has been a Trustee and the Administrator of the Kay Swift Memorial Trust. In 2004 Weber was the artistic advisor for a restoration recording project with the non-profit label PS Classics which resulted in the release of a CD of the complete score, with Broadway performers and an orchestra conducted by Aaron Gandy, of the 1930 hit Broadway musical Fine and Dandy.

== Writing career ==
In January 1993, the short story "Friend of the Family", her fiction debut in print, appeared in The New Yorker. Her short fiction has appeared in Story, Redbook, Southwest Review, Gargoyle, The Connecticut Review, the Vestal Review, Boulevard Magenta "five Chapters," and elsewhere. Her short story "Sleeping", originally in Vestal Review and anthologized several times, was made into a short dramatic film by Group-Six Productions. Her first novel, Objects in Mirror Are Closer Than They Appear, was published in 1995. She was named by Granta to the controversial list of 50 Best Young American Novelists in 1996. Her second novel, The Music Lesson, was published in 1999 and has since been translated into thirteen foreign languages. It was a selection of the Chautauqua Literary and Scientific Circle. Her third novel, The Little Women, a Finalist for the Paterson Fiction Prize, was published 2003. All three novels have been named Notable Books by The New York Times Book Review. In 2006 her fourth novel, Triangle, which is about the Triangle Shirtwaist Factory fire of 1911, was published. It won the 2007 Connecticut Book Award for Fiction and was longlisted for the 2008 International Dublin Literary Award. In July 2011, a memoir called The Memory of All That: George Gershwin, Kay Swift, and My Family's Legacy of Infidelities, was published by Crown, and in a paperback edition in June 2012 by Broadway Books. Her fifth novel, True Confections, was published in January, 2010. Her sixth novel, Still Life With Monkey, was published by Paul Dry Books in 2018. "Jane of Hearts and Other Stories" was published by Paul Dry Books in March 2022. Her literary essays have appeared in numerous recent anthologies.

From 2001 to 2003 Weber was elected to a term on the board of the National Book Critics Circle.

She is a Senior Editor at The Kenyon Review, and served as final judge for the Kenyon Review 2013 and 2014 Short Fiction Contests.

She was on the Editorial Advisory Board of American Imago 2016-2019.

She has written book reviews, essays, and columns for several publications, including the Boston Globe, the Chicago Tribune, The London Review of Books, The Los Angeles Times Book Review, New Haven Register, The New Leader, The New York Times, The New York Times Book Review, Publishers Weekly, Vogue and Washington Post Bookworld.

Weber has taught fiction writing at Yale University, Goucher College, the Paris Writers Workshop and elsewhere, including her service as a graduate thesis advisor in the writing program at the School of the Arts at Columbia University.

In 2012 she was appointed to the Visiting Richard L. Thomas Chair in Creative Writing at Kenyon College.

== Critical reception ==
In 1996 Katharine Weber was named by Granta to the controversial list of 50 Best Young American Novelists. All three of her first novels, Objects in Mirror Are Closer Than They Appear, The Music Lesson, and The Little Women, were identified as Notable Books by The New York Times Book Review. Winner of numerous awards for her work, Weber has been hailed as "a brilliant and ingenious formalist" Her most celebrated book, Triangle, has been described as "a marvel of ingenuity... a wide-awake novel as powerful as it is persuasive"

== Works ==
=== Books ===
- Objects in Mirror Are Closer Than They Appear (Crown Publishers, Inc, 1995. Picador, 1996. Broadway Books, 2011.)
- The Music Lesson (Crown Publishers, Inc., 1999. Picador, 2000. Broadway Books, 2011.)
- The Little Women (Farrar, Straus & Giroux, 2003. Picador 2004.)
- Triangle (Farrar, Straus & Giroux, 2006. Picador, 2007.)
- True Confections (Shaye Areheart Books, 2010. Broadway Books, 2011.)
- The Memory of All That: George Gershwin, Kay Swift, and My Family's Legacy of Infidelities (Crown, 2011; Broadway, 2012.)
- Still Life With Monkey (Paul Dry Books, 2018)

=== Anthologies ===
- "Without a Backward Cast: Notes of An Angler" Uncommon Waters: Women Write About Fishing, Holly Morris, editor (Seal Press, 1991.)
- "Conversations with Philip Roth" Two Interviews, G.J. Searles, editor (University Press of Mississippi, 1992.)
- "Interviews with Philip Roth and Annie Dillard" Writing for Your Life: The Best of Publishers Weekly Interviews, Sybil Steinberg, editor (Pushcart Press, 1992.)
- "Interview with Maeve Binchy" Writing for Your Life: The Best of Publishers Weekly Interviews, Vol. II, Sybil Steinberg, editor (Pushcart Press, 1995.)
- "The Reviewer's Experience" The Press of Ideas: Readings for Writers on Print Culture and the Information Age, Julie Bates Dock, editor (Bedford Books, 1996.)
- "Flowers After Surgery" Uncharted Lines, Charlene Breedlove, editor (Boaz Publishing, 1998.)
- "The Memory of All That" A Few Thousand Words About Love, Mickey Pearlman, editor (St. Martin's Press, 1998.)
- "Operation: Counterview" Smashing Icons, Christine Japely, editor (Curious Rooms, 1998.)
- "Dear J.D. Salinger" Letters to J.D. Salinger, Kubick et al., editor (University of Wisconsin Press, 2002.)
- It's a Girl: Women Writers on Raising Daughters, Andrea J. Buchanan, editor (Seal Press, 2006.)
- The Imperfect Mom: Candid Confessions of Mothers Living in the Real World, Therese J. Borchard (Broadway, 2006.)
- Half/Life: Jew-ish Tales from Almost, Not Quite, and In-Between, Laurel Snyder, editor (Soft Skull Press, 2006.)
- Flash Fiction Forward: 80 Very Short Stories, James Thomas and Robert Shapard, editors (W.W. Norton, 2006.)
- Searching for Mary Poppins: Women Write About the Intense Relationship Between Mothers and Nannies, Susan Davis and Gina Hyams, editors (Hudson Street Press, 2006.)
- The Book That Changed My Life: 71 Remarkable Writers Celebrate the Books that Matter Most to Them, Roxanne J. Coady and Joy Johannessen, editors (Gotham, 2006.)
- The Other Woman: Twenty-One Wives, Lovers, and Others Talk Openly About Sex, Deception, Love, and Betrayal, Victoria Zackheim, editor (Grand Central Publishing, 2007.)
- Bad Girls: 26 Writers Misbehave, Ellen Sussman, editor (Norton, 2007.)
- Dirty Words, Ellen Sussman, editor (Bloomsbury, 2008.)
