= Brenda Putnam =

American sculptor teacher and author (1890–1975)

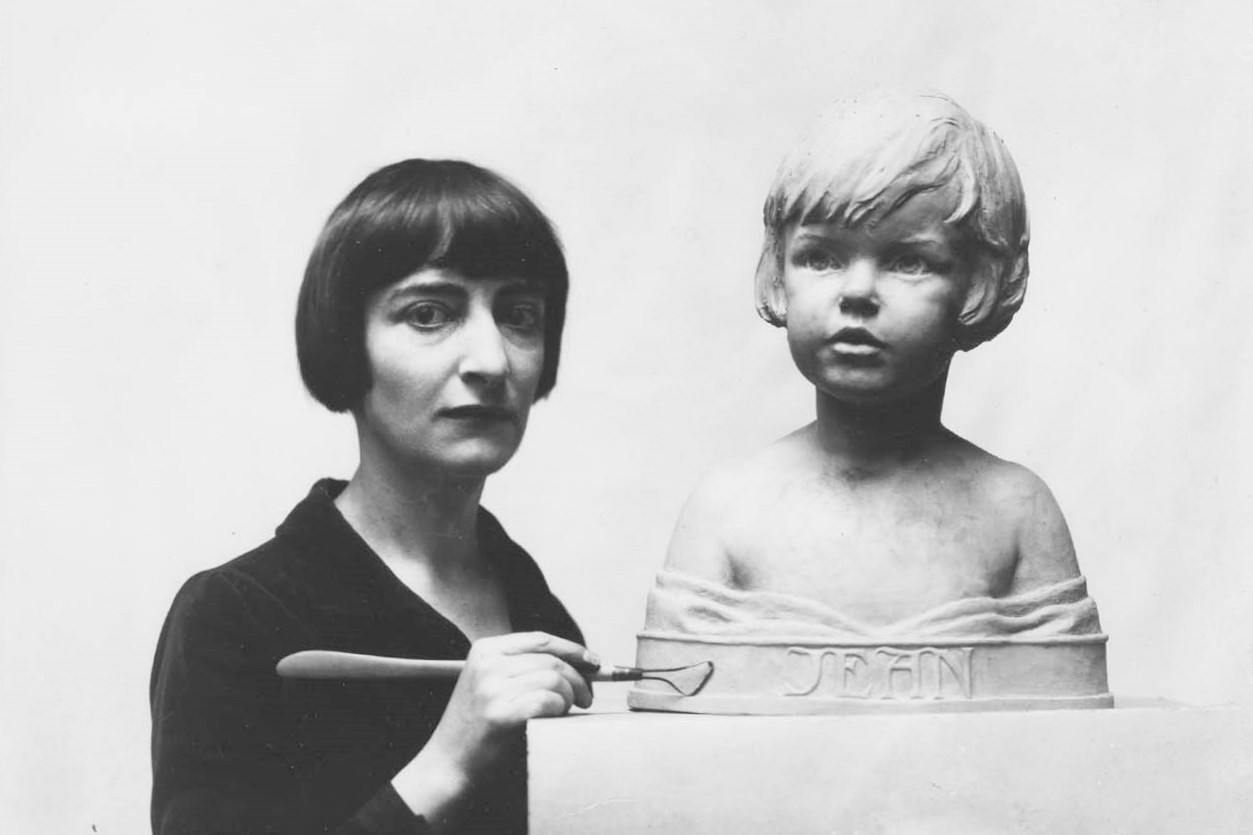
- Brenda Putnam with her Bust of Jean.
- Born: June 3, 1890; Minneapolis, Minnesota, U.S.
- Died: October 18, 1975 (aged 85); Concord, New Hampshire
- Known for: Sculpture
- Movement: Art Deco

Brenda Putnam (June 3, 1890 – October 18, 1975) was an American sculptor, teacher and author.

== Biography ==
She was the daughter of Librarian of Congress Herbert Putnam and his wife Charlotte Elizabeth Munroe. Her older sister Shirley and she were granddaughters of publisher George Palmer Putnam. She attended the National Cathedral School in Washington, D.C., where she first was taught to sculpt. She also trained as a classical pianist, and toured with violinist Edith Rubel and cellist Marie Roemaet as the Edith Rubel Trio.

She studied at the School of the Museum of Fine Arts, Boston, 1905–1907, under Mary E. Moore, William McGregor Paxton and Bela Pratt; then for three years at the Art Students League of New York under James Earle Fraser. She also studied at the Corcoran Museum Art School in Washington, D.C.

=== Early works ===
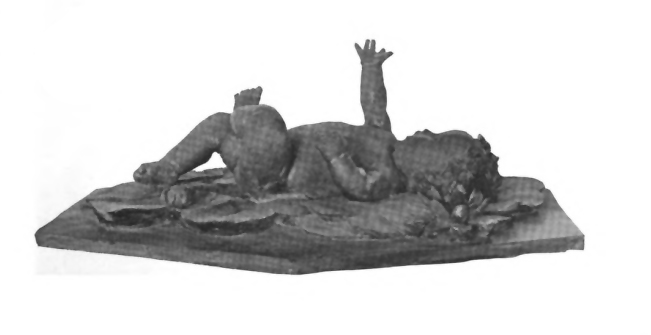
Brenda Putnam The Water Baby, 1917

Early in her career, Putnam was noted for her busts of children and for garden and fountain figures. She exhibited an overtly sensual piece at the National Academy of Design in 1915, Charmides [Dialogue], a nude woman and man asleep together, which was described as "Rodin-like". To mark the grave of her close friend, pianist Anne Simon, she created a profound work: the Simon Memorial (1917)—a nude male angel ecstatically rising from the clouds.

Rock Creek Cemetery, Washington, is a supremely beautiful spot wherein are erected many striking memorials. Within recent years there has grown to be another place of pilgrimage—the memorial to Mrs. Otto Torney Simon. The triumph of her passing from "life to life" ... is symbolized in the Simon Memorial wrought by Brenda Putnam. Until recently, I had never heard of this winged figure interpreted by one who knows the full significance of the statue. [T]his angel with wide flung hands and upward gaze symbolizes liberation of our faculties and our abilities, the enfranchisement of the soul released by the kindly gift of Death."

She modeled a series of busts of musicians, including Metropolitan Opera conductor Artur Bodanzky, Russian pianist Ossip Gabrilowitsch, British pianist Harold Bauer, and Polish harpsichordist Wanda Landowska. Her bust of Spanish cellist Pablo Casals was highly praised:

When playing, he always closes his eyes, tilts his head a little to the side, and seemingly loses himself in the magic of his music. It is this characteristic pose, with eyes closed, that Brenda Putnam has captured perfectly. This portrait bust, which one can sincerely say is magnificently done, is in the Museum of the Hispanic Society, New York, and a replica is in Spain.

Her Sea Horse Sundial (1922) – a winged cherub joyfully riding a seahorse hobby-horse (while the toy's stick casts its shadow on the sundial) – was widely praised, and received awards from the National Academy of Design, the Pennsylvania Academy of the Fine Arts, and elsewhere. She also had a success with her life-size, three-quarter-length, bas-relief portrait of William Dean Howells (1926), for the American Academy of Arts and Sciences.

About 1920, sculptor Anna Hyatt and Putnam rented an apartment and studio at 49 West 12th Street, Manhattan. Hyatt married millionaire Archer Milton Huntington in 1923 – their wedding took place at the studio – and the Huntingtons became great patrons of the arts. In 1931 they founded Brookgreen Gardens, a vast sculpture garden in Murrells Inlet, South Carolina.

=== A more modern aesthetic ===
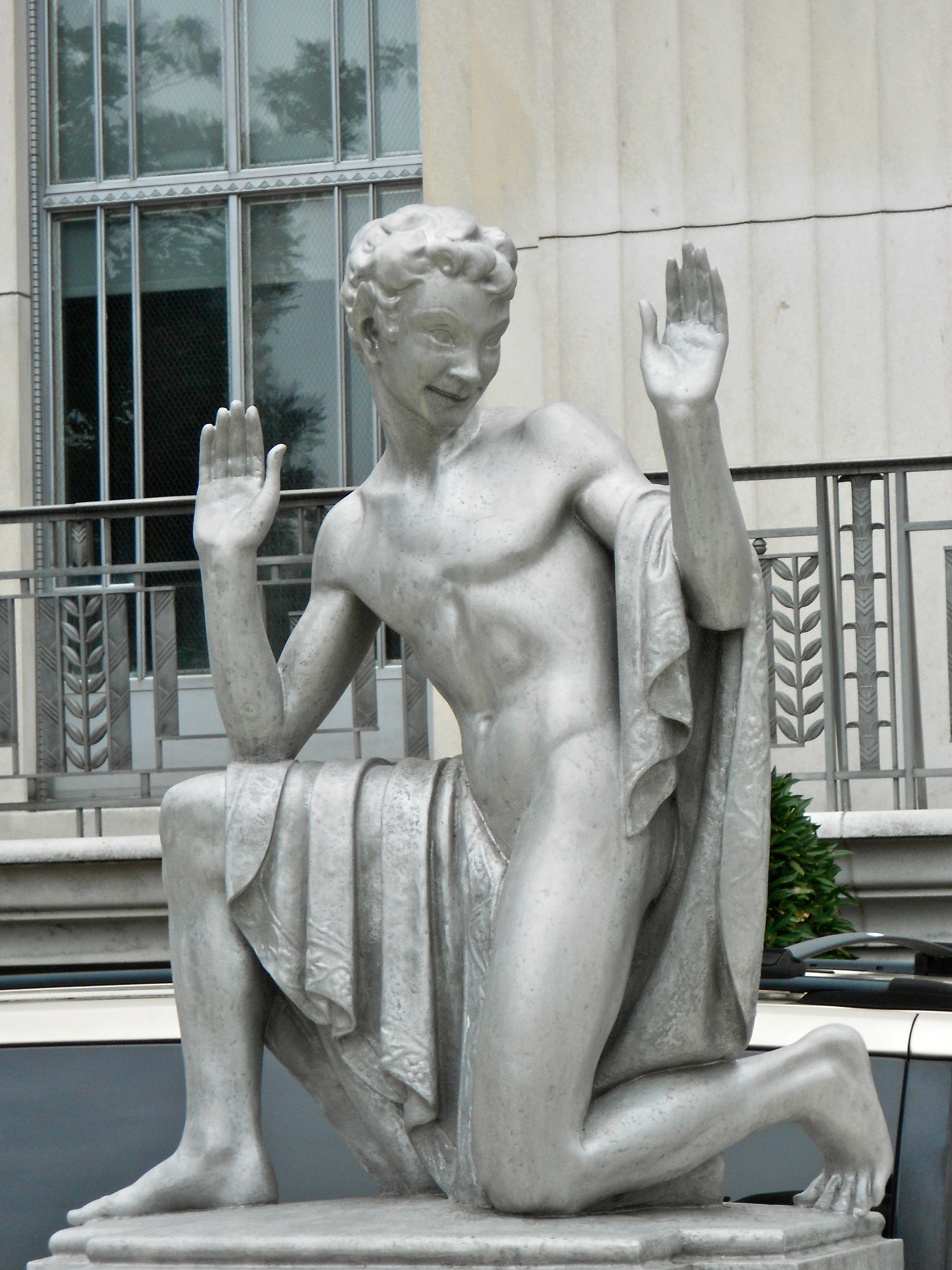
Puck (1930-1932, replica 2002), Folger Shakespeare Library, Washington, D.C.

Putnam grew dissatisfied with conventional academic sculpture. Her desire to pursue "a more modern aesthetic" brought her to Italy in 1927, where she studied under Libero Andreotti, and later under Alexander Archipenko in New York City.

She collaborated with architect Paul Philippe Cret on the Art Deco Puck Fountain (1930–1932), for the west garden of the Folger Shakespeare Library in Washington, D.C. Inscribed below her Figure of Puck is the elf's famous line from A Midsummer Night's Dream: "What fooles these mortals be." The marble sculpture, damaged by acid rain and vandalism, was removed in 2001, restored, and placed inside the library. It was used to cast an aluminum replica that was placed atop the fountain in 2002.

She exhibited three works as part of the 1932 Summer Olympics in Los Angeles, California. She created bas-relief murals for two U.S. post offices under the Works Progress Administration. Her fountain figure, Crest of the Wave (1939), a larger-than-life male nude swimming atop a stylized wave, made its debut at the 1939 New York World's Fair.

Putnam seriously injured her arm in an industrial accident during World War II. She gave up creating large-scale works and concentrated on busts and smaller pieces.

In 1942, she created the 26th issue of the Society of Medalists. She was commissioned to create the Admiral Ernest Joseph King Congressional Gold Medal (1945–46), awarded by a Special Act of Congress, March 22, 1946, for Admiral King's distinguished leadership of U.S. Naval Forces in World War II. She created three bas-relief portrait busts (1949–50) for the House of Representatives chamber in the United States Capitol. Her last completed sculpture was the Bust of Susan B. Anthony (1952) for the Hall of Fame for Great Americans.

Putnam had made the stylistic transition from Academic to Art Deco, but she was no fan of post-war Modernism. In 1952 the Metropolitan Museum of Art announced its intention to expand its holdings of contemporary sculpture. On behalf of the conservative National Sculpture Society (of which she was a fellow), Putnam vehemently advocated that The Met purchase realist works.

=== Awards and honors ===
Putnam exhibited at the 1911 International Exhibition of Art and History in Rome. She exhibited regularly at the National Academy of Design beginning in 1911, where Sea Horse Sundial won the 1922 Barnett Prize, and Mid-Summer won the 1935 Waltrous Gold Medal. She exhibited at the National Sculpture Society's exhibitions, including 1916, 1923, 1929, and 1940. Water-Lily Baby received an Honorable Mention at the 1917 Art Institute of Chicago annual exhibition. She exhibited regularly at the Pennsylvania Academy of the Fine Arts between 1910 and 1944, and won the 1923 Widener Gold Medal for Sea Horse Sundial. She won the 1923 Prize for Sculpture from the National Association of Women Painters and Sculptors for [add work]. Fountain for a Formal Garden [The Pigeon Girl?] won the 1924 Avery Prize from the Architectural League of New York.

She was elected an associate member of the National Academy in 1934, and an academician in 1936. She was elected to the National Association of Women Painters and Sculptors in [year], and designed them a 7-sided Art Deco medal in 1941 when they changed their name to the National Association of Women Artists. She was elected to the National Sculpture Society in 1919, served as its secretary, 1933-1936, and later was elected a fellow of the society.

=== Teacher and author ===
Putnam had a 30-year career teaching at various institutions and privately. She incorporated that experience into her book, The Sculptor's Way: A Guide to Modeling and Sculpture, first published in 1939. It is still considered a classic on the subject and was in print as recently as 2003. She also was the author of Animal X-Rays: A Skeleton Key to Comparative Anatomy (New York: G.P. Putnams's Sons, 1947).

Among her students were Elfriede Abbe, Laura Gilpin, Ethel Painter Hood, Beatrice Gilman Proske, Lilian Swann Saarinen, Marion Sanford, and Katharine Lane Weems.

=== Death and legacy ===
Putnam never married, but maintained long friendships with a number of her students. She retired to Wilton, Connecticut in the early 1950s. She moved to Concord, New Hampshire in 1971, where she died in 1975.

Works by her are in the collections of the Metropolitan Museum of Art, the National Gallery of Art, the Smithsonian American Art Museum, and many other museums. Brookgreen Gardens holds several of her works.

The Brenda Putnam Papers are at Syracuse University. The Smithsonian American Art Museum holds a collection of photographs of her works.

== Selected works ==
=== Sculptures ===
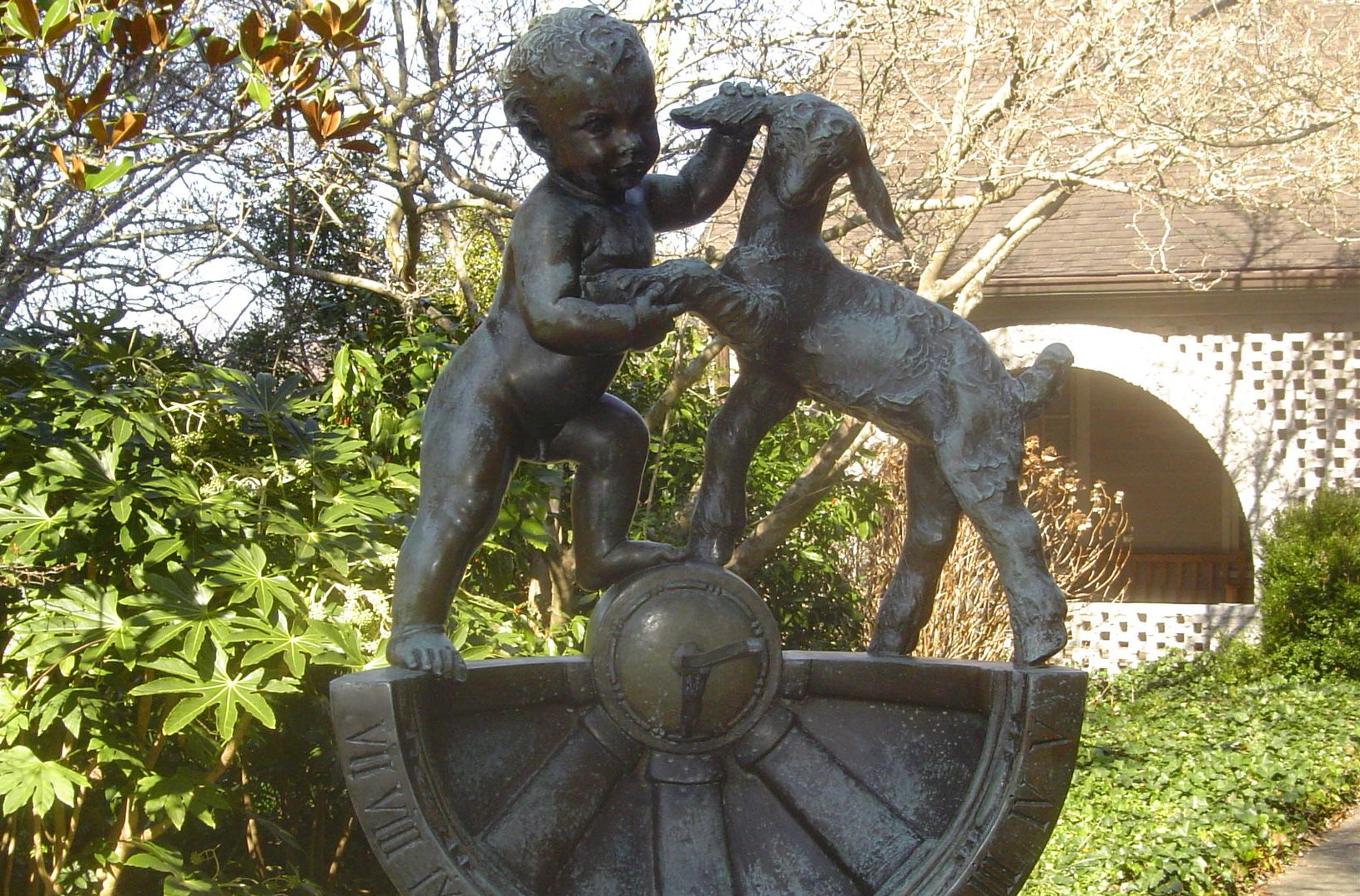
Two Kids Sundial (1931), Brookgreen Gardens, Murrells Inlet, South Carolina.

External videos
- The Pigeon Girl, Brenda Putnam, Indianapolis Museum of Art

- Charmides [Dialogue] (1915, marble), unlocated.
- The Pigeon Girl (c. 1919, bronze), "Oldfields", Indianapolis Museum of Art, Indianapolis, Indiana. Putnam's sculpture was placed in Oldfield's formal garden sometime after J. K. Lilly Jr.'s 1933 purchase of the estate.
- Young Faun (1919, bronze), Dallas Arboretum and Botanical Garden (on loan from Dallas Museum of Art), Dallas, Texas. Also known as Stop Thief, it depicts a young faun stealing flowers.
- Sea Horse Sundial (1922, bronze), Williamstown, Massachusetts.
- Elizabeth Sprague Coolidge Tablet (1925, marble), Library of Congress, Washington, D.C.
- Bas-relief Portrait of William Dean Howells (1926, bronze), American Academy of Arts and Sciences, Cambridge, Massachusetts.
- Harriet, Isabella and Katherine Beecher (1926, gold-painted bronze), Stowe-Day Foundation, Hartford, Connecticut. Sculpture group of three sisters sitting on a park bench.
- Figure of Puck (1930–32, marble), Puck Fountain, Folger Shakespeare Library, Washington, D.C., Paul Cret, architect.
- Two Kids Sundial (1931, bronze), Brookgreen Gardens, Murrells Inlet, South Carolina. The sundial features a child and a young goat.
- Mid-Summer (1935, carved in marble 1946), Norton Museum of Art, West Palm Beach, Florida. A female nude reclining on a bed of summer vegetables.
- Bas-relief lunette: Sorting the Mail (1936–37, plaster), Post Office, Caldwell, New Jersey. The lunette is now in storage.
- Bas-relief mural: Mississippi Divides the Southwest from the Northeast (1936–39, plaster), Post Office, St. Cloud, Minnesota. Removed to Minnesota Department of Manpower Services Building.
- W. Albert Manda Memorial (1939), Meadowland Park, South Orange, New Jersey.
- Communion (1939, bronze), Brookgreen Gardens, Murrells Inlet, South Carolina.
- Crest of the Wave (1939, medium), 1939 New York World's Fair, Queens, New York City.

=== Cemetery monuments ===
- Simon Memorial (1917, marble), Rock Creek Cemetery, Washington D.C.
- Porter Monument (1931–32, bronze), Allegheny Cemetery, Pittsburgh, Pennsylvania. Putnam replaced its 1890s stone angel with a bronze replica.
- Carefree Days (c. 1932, bronze), Mead Monument, Forest Lawn Cemetery, Glendale, California.
- Fortitude, Kindliness, Vision (1943, limestone), Morton Memorial, Spring Hill Cemetery, Lynchburg, Virginia. Also known as Memorial to the Women of Virginia.

=== Busts and statuettes ===
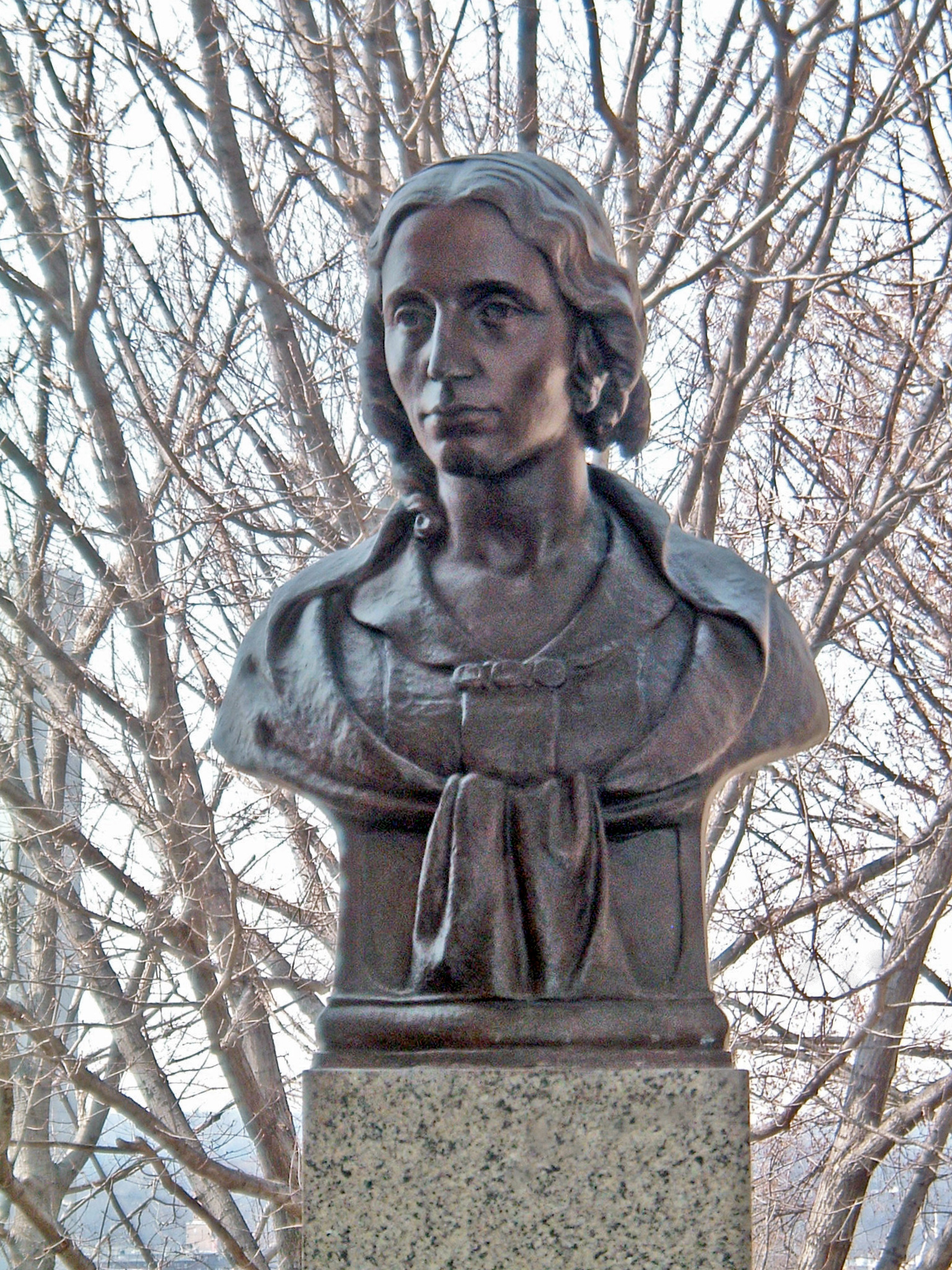
Harriet Beecher Stowe (1925), Hall of Fame for Great Americans, Bronx, New York.

- Statuette of Sir Johnston Forbes-Robertson as Hamlet (1915, plaster; 1932, bronze), Folger Shakespeare Library, Washington, D.C.
- Bust of Herbert Putnam (1922, medium), Library of Congress, Washington, D.C. Portrait of the sculptor's father.
- Bust of Pablo Casals (1923, bronze), Hispanic Society of America, New York City.
  - A copy is at Villa Casals, El Vendrell (Catalonia), Spain.
- Bust of Harriet Beecher Stowe (1925, bronze), Hall of Fame for Great Americans, Bronx Community College, Bronx, New York.
- Bust of Wanda Landowska (1928, medium).
- Bust of Amelia Earhart (1932, marble), Syracuse University, Syracuse, New York.
- Bust of Ossip Gabrilowitsch (1933, marble), Detroit Institute of Arts, Detroit, Michigan.
- Bust of John Mapother (1936, plaster), Speed Art Museum, Louisville, Kentucky.
- Bust of Mary Baker Eddy (1937, medium).
- Bust of Artur Bodanzky (by 1940, medium), Hispanic Society of America, New York City.
- Bust of Harold Bauer (1949, medium).
- Great Law-Givers: three bas-relief portrait busts (1949–50, marble), U.S. House of Representatives Chamber, U.S. Capitol, Washington, D.C.
  - Maimonides
  - Solon
  - Tribonian
- Bust of William Adams Delano (1950, bronze), National Academy of Design, New York.
- Bust of Susan B. Anthony (1952, bronze), Hall of Fame for Great Americans, Bronx Community College, Bronx, New York. Putnam's last completed sculpture.

=== Medals and coins ===
- Charles P. Daly Medal (1924, bronze). Awarded by the American Geographical Society, Putnam's design replaced the 1902 medal by Victor David Brenner.
- Cleveland Centennial half dollar (1936, silver), Minted 1936–1937.
- National Association of Women Artists Medal (1941, bronze).
- Amelia Earhart Medal (1941, bronze), Princeton University Library, Princeton, New Jersey.
- Flight Medal (1941–42, bronze), Snite Museum of Art, University of Notre Dame, South Bend, Indiana.
  - Replicas are at Fogg Museum, Harvard University; National Gallery of Art; Smithsonian American Art Museum; and elsewhere.
- Admiral Ernest Joseph King Congressional Gold Medal (1945–46).
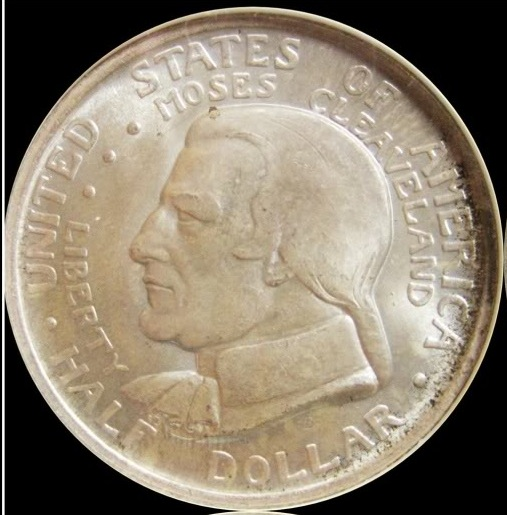
Cleveland Centennial half dollar (1936).

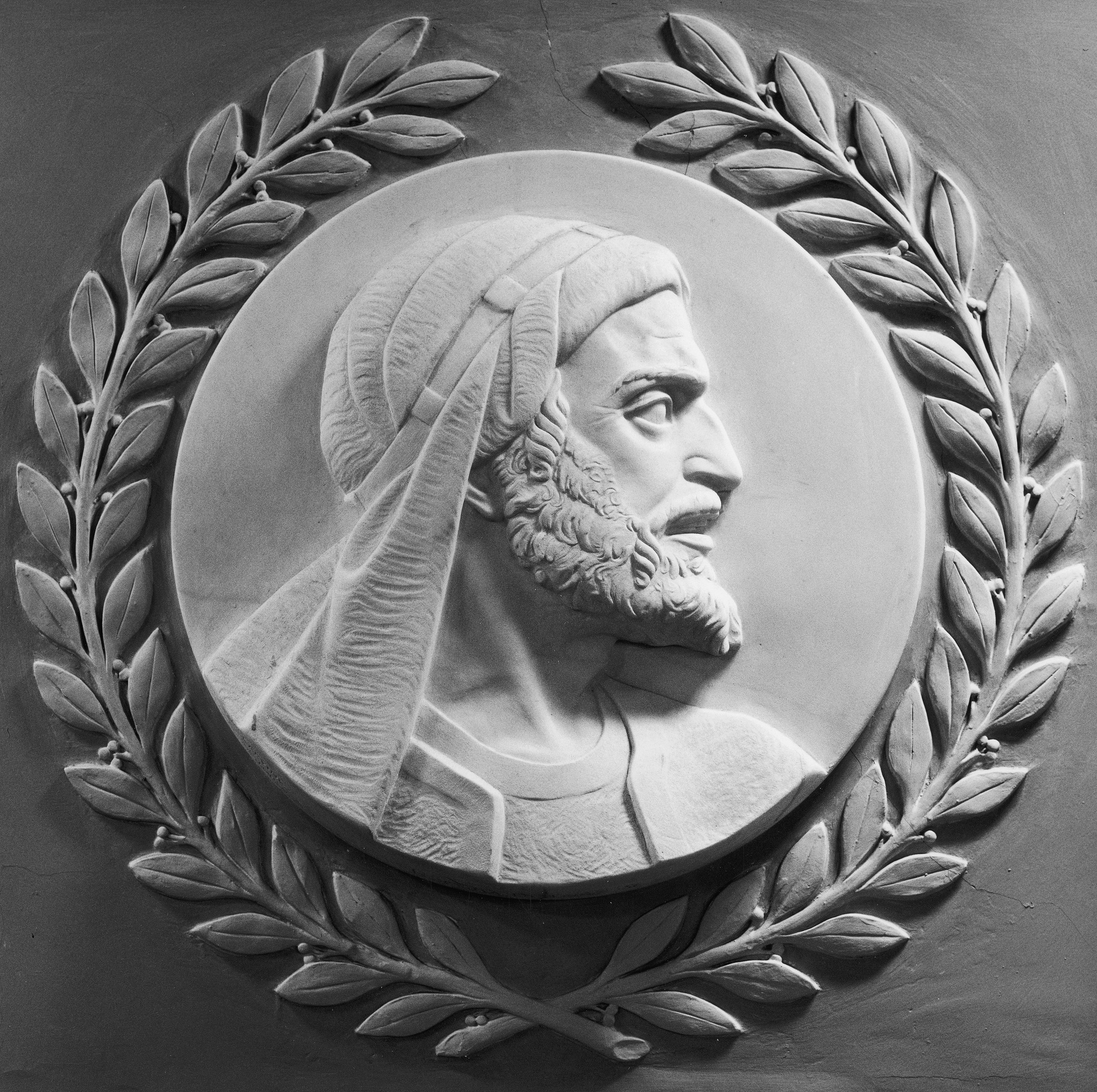
Maimonides (1949–50), U.S. Capitol, Washington, D.C.
