= A Pagan Poem =

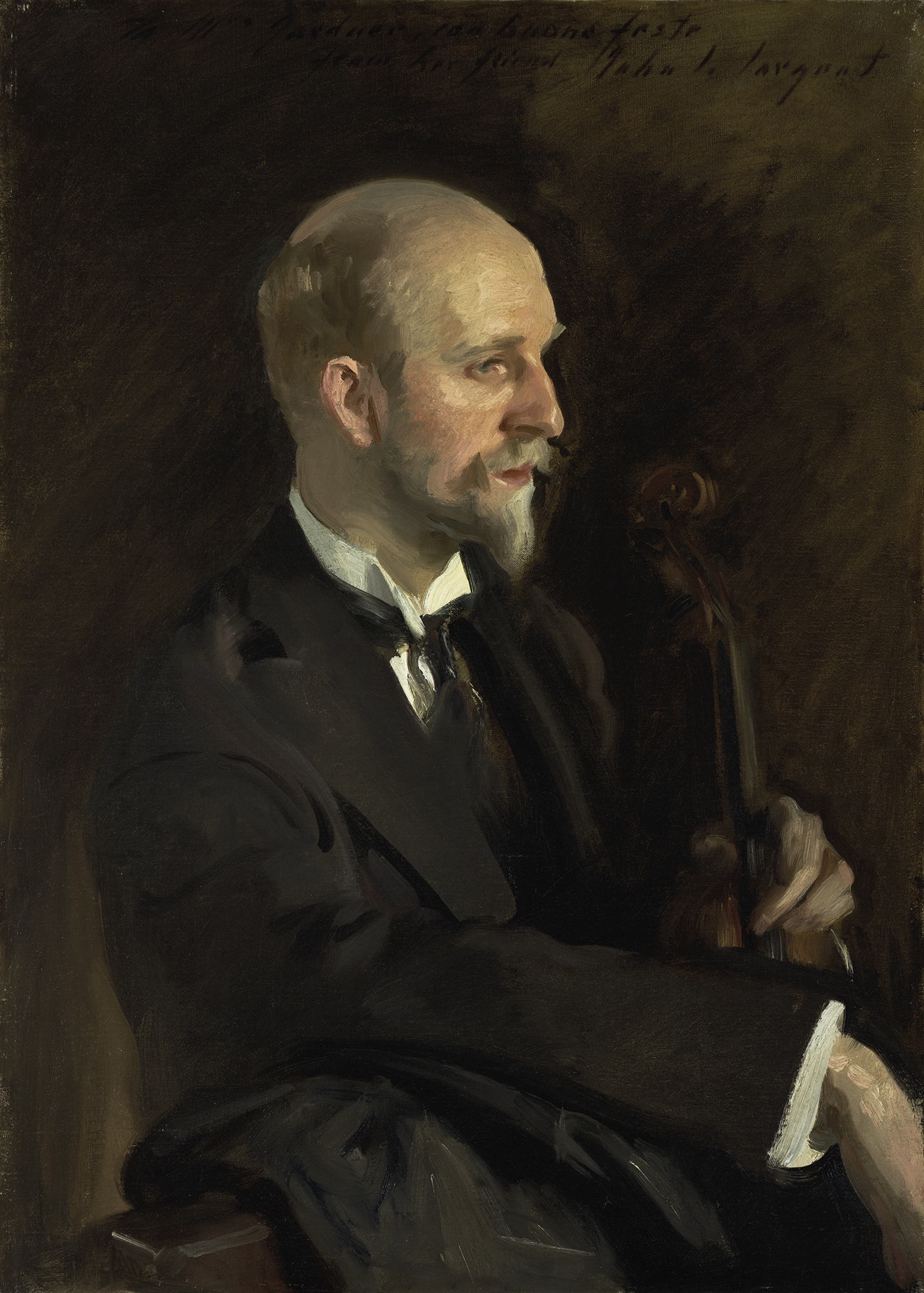
Portrait of Charles Martin Loeffler by John Singer Sargent, 1903

A Pagan Poem is a tone poem for orchestra composed in 1906 by Charles Martin Loeffler. Originally scored for piano, woodwinds, violin, and contrabass, the work was rescored for two pianos and three trumpets. The final version, which, in addition to traditional forces includes piano, solo English horn, and three solo trumpets, was introduced on November 23, 1907, by the Boston Symphony under the direction of Karl Muck.

Loeffler derived inspiration for the work from the eighth eclogue of Virgil, in which a maiden of Thessaly uses magic to revive her lover's ardor once he deserts her. Rather than follow the program literally, the composer chose to depict moods suggested by the text. Loeffler used extended harmonies to evoke an antique sound.
