= Charles Martin Loeffler =

American violinist and composer (1861–1935)

Charles Martin Tornov Loeffler
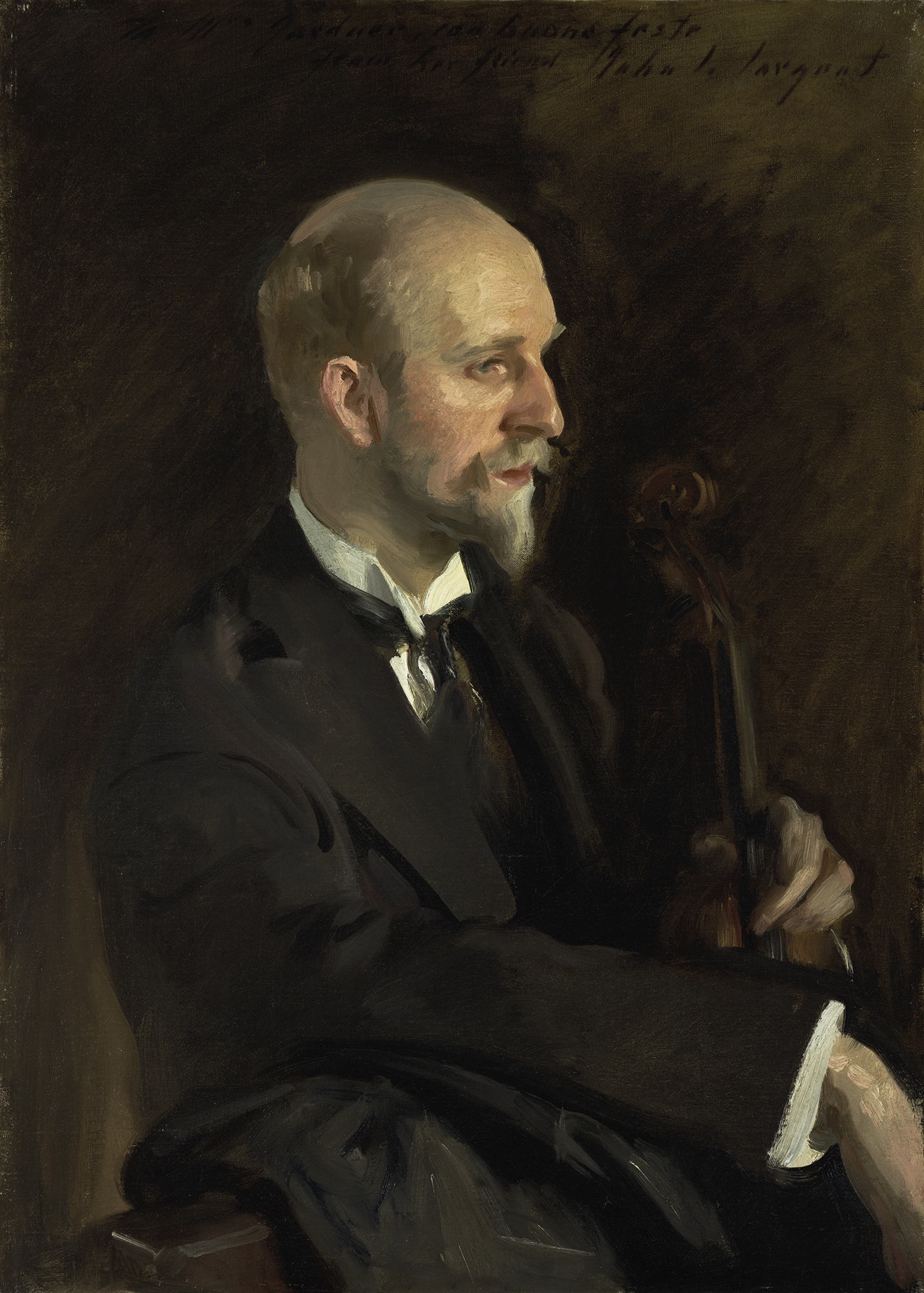
- Portrait of Charles Martin Loeffler by John Singer Sargent, 1903
- Born: Martin Karl Löffler; January 30, 1861; Schöneberg, Germany
- Died: May 19, 1935 (aged 74); Medfield, Massachusetts, U.S.

Charles Martin Tornov Loeffler (January 30, 1861 – May 19, 1935) was a German-born American violinist, composer, and viola d'amore player.

== Family background ==
Charles Martin Loeffler was born Martin Karl Löffler on January 30, 1861, in Schöneberg near Berlin to parents who were both from Berlin families. The family moved repeatedly, first to Alsace, and then to Smila, 200 km from Kiev, while Loeffler was still a small child, and then to Debrecen, in Hungary, where his father Karl taught at the Royal Academy of Agriculture. Later he lived in Switzerland.

The father, Karl Löffler, was an agricultural chemist who espoused republican ideals in writing as a journalist under the name "Tornow" or "Tornov". When his son was about twelve years old, Prussian authorities arrested Karl Loeffler and he died of a stroke in prison. Throughout his career, Charles Martin Loeffler claimed to have been born in Mulhouse, Alsace; in his lifetime, articles were published dissecting his "typically Alsatian" temperament. He sometimes used his father's pseudonyms as one of his middle names.

== Career ==
Loeffler decided to become a violinist and studied in Berlin with Joseph Joachim, Friedrich Kiel and Woldemar Bargiel, then with Joseph Massart (and composition with Ernest Guiraud) in Paris. He played with the Pasdeloup Orchestra and in 1881 emigrated to the United States, where he joined the Boston Symphony Orchestra as assistant concertmaster from 1882 to 1903. He was on the board of directors of the Boston Opera Company when it started operations in 1908.

He first appeared as a violinist-composer with the orchestra in 1891 with the performance of his suite Les Vieilles d'Ukraine, and his works were performed regularly by the Boston Symphony (and by other American orchestras) for the rest of his life.

Loeffler became a U.S. citizen in 1887 and eventually resigned from the orchestra to devote himself to composition. He was a friend of Eugène Ysaÿe, Dennis Miller Bunker, and John Singer Sargent (who painted his portrait), also of Gabriel Fauré and Ferruccio Busoni (both of whom dedicated works to him), and later of George Gershwin. A man of wide culture and refined taste, he developed an idiom deeply influenced by contemporary French and Russian music, in the traditions of César Franck, Ernest Chausson and Claude Debussy, and also by Symbolist and "decadent" literature. Loeffler often cultivated unusual combinations of instruments, and was one of the earliest modern enthusiasts for the viola d'amore, which he discovered in 1894 and wrote parts for in several scores as well as arranging much music for it. In his later years he also, unexpectedly, became deeply interested in jazz, and wrote some works for jazz band.

His notable students include Arthur Hartmann, Kay Swift, Samuel Gardner and Francis Judd Cooke, who studied with him for two years in Medfield, Massachusetts. Loeffler died in 1935 in Medfield, at the age of 74.

== Works ==
Loeffler was a fastidious composer who composed carefully, frequently revising his compositions. Some of his works are lost. His best-known works include the symphonic poems La Mort de Tintagiles (after Maeterlinck), La Bonne Chanson (after Verlaine), A Pagan Poem (after Virgil), and Memories of My Childhood (Life in a Russian Village), as well as the song-cycle Five Irish Fantasies (to words by W. B. Yeats and Heffernan), and the chamber works Music for Four Stringed Instruments and Two Rhapsodies for oboe, viola and piano. The Music for Four Stringed Instruments was written in 1917 after his friend John Jay Chapman's son Victor became the first American aviator to die in World War I. Chapman published his son's letters in 1917 and Loeffler was inspired to write this string quartet as a combination meditation and memorial.

His Divertissement for violin and orchestra was premiered in Berlin in 1905 by Karel Halíř, under the baton of Richard Strauss, at the same concert at which Halíř premiered the revised version of Sibelius's Violin Concerto. Fritz Kreisler and Eugène Ysaÿe had declined to play the Divertissement because of its technical demands.

He composed the Fantastic Concert for cello and orchestra, which premiered in 1894 with Alwin Schroeder as soloist with the Boston Symphony Orchestra, and the Entertainment for violin and orchestra (1895).

He composed the symphonic poem La Villanelle du Diable in 1901. This work is inspired by the eponymous poem by Rollinat, and dedicated to Franz Kneisel. It was premiered in April 1902 by the Boston Symphony Orchestra under Wilhelm Gericke, and published by Schirmer in 1905. He later reworked the piece for orchestra and organ; this version was performed by the BSO in January 1910.

=== Orchestral works ===
- Les Veillées de l’Ukraine Suite for violin and orchestra (1887)
- Une nuit de Mai, Concert Piece for Violin and Orchestra (1891)
- Morceau fantastique for cello and orchestra (1894)
- Divertimento (sometimes Divertissement) in A minor for Violin and Orchestra (1895)
- La mort de Tintagiles, Symphonic Poem for two Violas d’amore and Orchestra after Maeterlinck, Op. 6 (1897)
- Divertissement Espagnol for alto saxophone and orchestra (1900)
- La villanelle du Diable, Symphonic Poem for Organ and Orchestra after Rollinat (1901)
- La bonne chanson: avant que tu ne t'en ailles, symphonic poem in F-major after Verlaine (1901)
- A Pagan Poem, Symphonic Poem after Virgil, Op. 14 (1906)
- Memories of my Childhood (Life in a Russian Village), Symphonic Poem (1924)
- Intermezzo (Clowns) for jazz band (1928)
- Five Irish Fantasies for Voice and Orchestra (1935)
  1. The Hosting of the Sidhe
  2. The Host of the Air
  3. The Fiddler of Dooney
  4. Ballad of the Fox-Hunter
  5. The Song of Caitilin Ni Uallachain

=== Chamber works ===
- Sonata for violin and piano (1886),
- String Quartet (1889)
- String Quintet (1889)
- Octet for two clarinets, two violins, viola and cello, harp and double bass (1896)
- Carnival Ballade for flute, oboe, saxophone, bassoon and piano (1902)
- Dramatic Scenes for cello and piano (1916)
- Music for Four Stringed Instruments (1917)
- Short stories for string quartet and harp (1922)
- Partita for violin and piano (1930)

=== Songs ===
- Dansons la Gigue!
- La cloche félée
- Sérénade
- Timbres oubliés
- Adieu pour jamais
- Les Paons

== Sources ==
- Ellen Knight, Charles Martin Loeffler: A Life Apart in American Music (University of Illinois Press, 1993).
- Sadie, S. (ed.) (1980) The New Grove Dictionary of Music & Musicians, vol. 11.
