= Edmund Battersby =

American classical pianist (1949–2016)

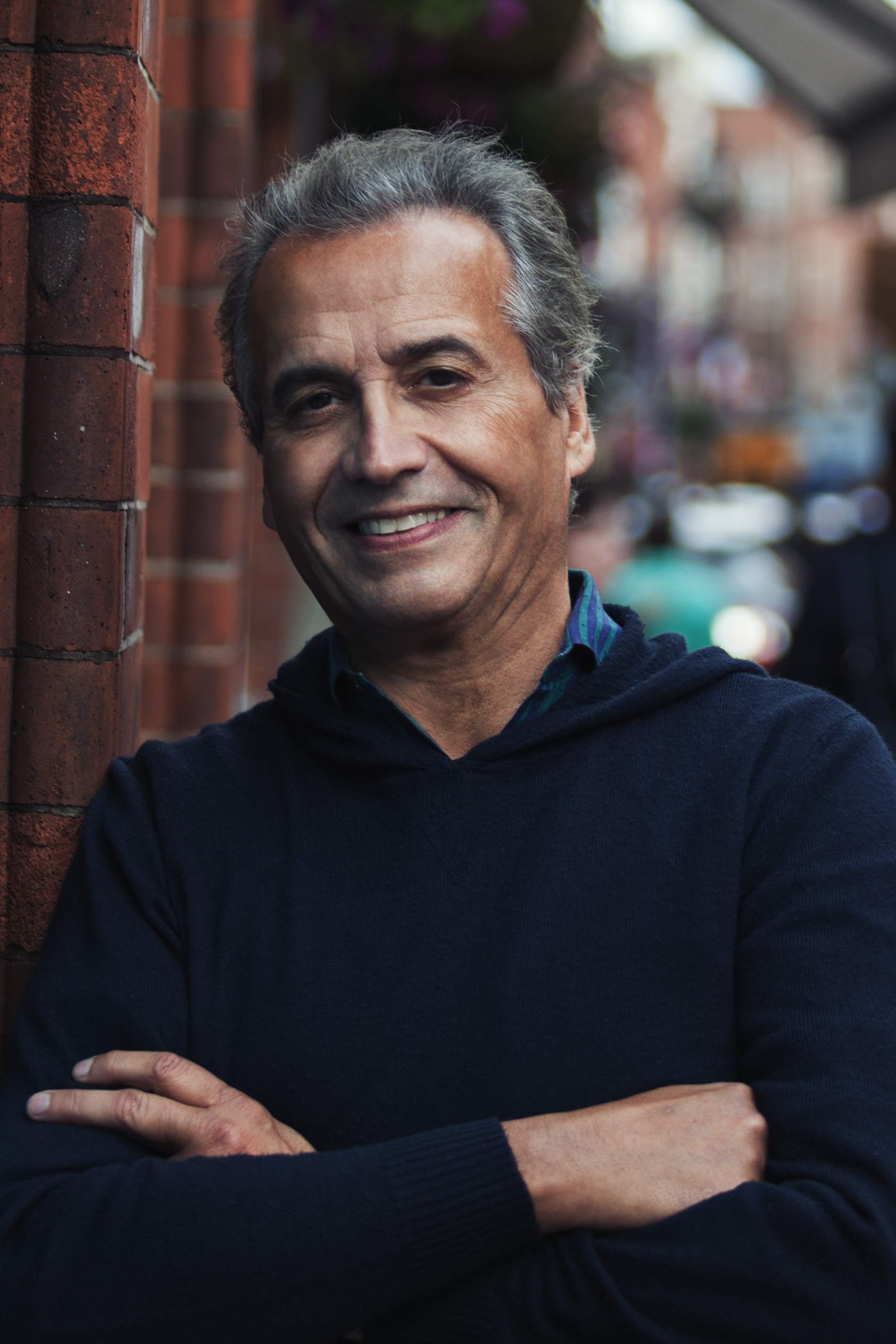
Edmund Battersby photo by Evan Duning

Edmund Battersby (November 10, 1949 – March 25, 2016) was an American classical pianist and professor at the Jacobs School of Music of Indiana University.

== Life and career ==
Edmund Battersby was born in Detroit, Michigan in 1949. His teachers included Barbara Holmquest, Artur Balsam, at Kneisel Hall, in Blue Hill, Maine, followed by Sascha Gorodnitski at the Juilliard School, where he earned his Bachelor of Music and Master of Music degrees.

Battersby taught at Montclair State College, now Montclair State University, and Kneisel Hall before joining the faculty of the Jacobs School of Music of Indiana University in Bloomington, Indiana.

He performed as soloist with major symphony orchestras including Pittsburgh, New Jersey and Indianapolis, broadcast numerous concerts from the Library of Congress, appeared on the Great Performers at Lincoln Center and Mostly Mozart series and gave notable solo recitals at Alice Tully Hall and Wigmore Hall.

== Recordings ==
In 2006, the American Record Guide wrote that his recordings of Beethoven's Diabelli Variations, on modern and period instruments, put him "in the company of Brendel, Serkin, Schnabel, and Pollini.". This recording was also reviewed in the Irish Times and the Toronto Star described it as, "one of those must-get albums for anyone interested in Beethoven or piano music".

Battersby's many recordings for Musical Heritage Society, Naxos, and Koch have been widely reviewed and recognized: the 1992 Grammy Short list for Goyescas of Granados among them.

In 2013, Battersby re-released previously unavailable archival Musical Heritage Society recordings of Felix Mendelssohn's, Songs Without Words(complete), Franz Schubert's, Shorter Works for Piano and The Early Romantic Piano which was described as "...quite simply a beautiful recording that should be heard by everyone." This was performed on a replica of an 1824 instrument by Conrad Graf crafted by Rodney Regier of Freeport, Maine. Edmund Battersby's From Iberia was released in 2014.

=== Selected discography ===
- Granados: Goyescas; Nin-Culmell: Tonadas (Koch 1990)
- Rachmaninoff: Preludes and Etudes Tableaux, Opp. 22, 33 and 39 (Koch 1993)
- Dvořák: Works for Violin and Piano, Qian Zhou (Naxos 2001)
- Dvořák: Ballad, Capriccio & Silent Woods, Qian Zhou (Naxos 2002)
- Beethoven: Variations on a waltz by Diabelli, for piano in C major ("Diabelli Variations"), Op. 120 (Naxos, 2005)
- The Early Romantic Piano:Schumann and Chopin (2012)
- Mendelssohn: Songs Without Words (2012)
- Franz Schubert: Shorter works for piano (2013)
- Isaac Albeniz: From Iberia (2014)

== Performances ==
During his career, Battersby gave recitals worldwide, including performances at Wigmore Hall, London; Carnegie Hall, New York; the Great Performers series at Lincoln Center for the Performing Arts; the Library of Congress, Washington; and the Kennedy Center.

Battersby performed with the Vermeer Quartet, the Tokyo String Quartet and the Orion String Quartet, and has collaborated with conductors such as McGegan, Schwarz and Schuller He debuted a work by composer George Crumb in California in 1981.

In 1990 Battersby played a recital at the National Museum of American History on a 140-year-old Erard piano that was made for Prince Albert at the request of Queen Victoria.

=== Reviews ===
Examples of published reviews of his performances:

- The Washington Post (1977), reviewing his concert at the Phillips Collection
- New York Times (1982), reviewing a concert at the 92d Street Y
- New York Times (1985), reviewing Battersby's performance accompanying Barbara Stein Mallow, describing him as "a pianist of uncommon refinement"
- The Irish Times (2002), reviewing a recital of works by Mozart, Schumann, and Chopin at Dagg Hall where Battersby's "fluent" and "faithful" playing gave "a fresh insight into a bygone world"
- The Herald Times (2011), reviewing a concert at Auer Hall in Bloomington, IN described him as a "superb pianist" and "master of the keyboard"
- International Piano (January/February 2014), reviewing his masterclass at The Piano Academy of Ireland: Battersby is quoted as telling a student, "'Your technique is in your ear, it's not in your hands.' and given the transformation he had just wrought, the point was well made."

== Festivals and masterclasses ==
Battersby performed at a number of festivals around the world, and gave masterclasses in the art of playing piano:

=== United States ===
- Mostly Mozart Festival,
- Santa Fe Chamber Music Festival
- The Seattle Chamber Music Festival
- La Jolla,
- Kneisel Hall,
- Bowdoin International Music Festival,
- Princeton
- Duke

=== Europe ===
- La Gesse Festival and Piano aux Jacobins in Toulouse,
- Festival of the Sound in Canada,
- Royal Irish Academy of Music,
- Hochschule für Musik in Leipzig,
- Euro Arts Festival in Halle, Austria
- Dublin, Ireland; The Dublin International Piano Festival

== Publications ==
- Early Music America Magazine
- The Art of the Romantic piano, Edmund Battersby on What Early Instruments can teach us and Rachmaninoff Roots in Keyboard Classics

Battersby is included as an authority in Robert Cunningham's biography of Sergei Rachmaninoff, as well as being a contributing author for Remembering Horowitz: 125 Pianists Recall a Legend by David Dubal.

Battersby was interviewed about his career by Heidi Waleson in Early Music America, and in 2013 by Jerry Dubins for the January 2013 issue of Fanfare Magazine.

== Commentary ==
Battersby is included in: "Piano Lessons: Music, Love and True Adventures", by Noah Adams, two reference books by David Dubal devoted to pianists, The Art of the Piano; its Performers, Literature and Recordings and The Art of the Piano; an Encyclopedia of Performers by David Dubal and in the Routledge Studies in Musical Genera series on 19th Century Piano Music by Larry Todd

== See also ==
- List of classical pianists
