= Jane Rubel =

American basketball player

- Born: Jane Christoffer; December 31, 1955 (age 70)
- Spouse: Ken Rubel (m. 1970)
- Children: 2

Jane Rubel (born Jane Christoffer on December 31, 1955) is an athlete and postal worker noted for her lawsuit against the Iowa Girls High School Athletic Union (IGHSAU) when she was denied eligibility to play after marrying and having a child.

== Early life ==
Rubel attended Ruthven Consolidated High School beginning in 1968, where she played on the basketball team in her freshman and sophomore years, averaging 35 and 47 points per game, respectively. Coach Richard Barber stated that she was "as good a player as we've had in the 20 years I've been here." In the spring of 1970, Jane Christoffer (as she was then known) discovered that she was pregnant. She had been dating the baby's father, Ken Rubel, for two years and married him on July 17, 1970. On December 5, 1970, she gave birth to a daughter, Jennifer.

== Lawsuit ==
In 1971, she approached the school about rejoining the basketball team to pursue a possible college scholarship. However, a rule of the IGHSAU forbade married women and mothers from participating, meaning that if she were allowed to do so, it "would effectively disqualify all of Ruthven's girls' teams from being able to compete in any sports."

When Rubel was denied eligibility again in the 1971–72 season, she filed suit against the IGHSAU for violation of her civil rights. The suit noted that the rules discriminated against female students, as male students were permitted to be married and/or fathers and still participate in sports. Shortly before the hearing scheduled to argue the case, IGHSAU reversed course and ruled that Rubel was eligible. In January 1972, the court ruled "IGHSAU had violated the constitutions of both the United States and the state of Iowa by barring married and divorced women and mothers from participating in high school sports."

Rubel ultimately completed her senior year at Ruthven on the basketball team, although she contends that IGHSAU unjustly prevented her from qualifying for the state tournament in that year. After graduating, she became a postal worker and had a second daughter.

Her papers are held by the Iowa Women's Archives.
