= Joseph Fuchs =

American violinist

Joseph Philip Fuchs (April 26, 1899 or 1900 – March 14, 1997) was one of the most important American violinists and teachers of the 20th century, and the brother of Lillian Fuchs.

Born in New York, he graduated in 1918 from the Institute of Musical Art in New York where he studied with Franz Kneisel. In 1926 he was appointed concertmaster of the Cleveland Orchestra, but resigned in 1940 to pursue a solo career. After a successful New York début in 1943, he became co-founder of the Musicians’ Guild, a chamber music organization which he directed there until 1956.

He toured extensively in Europe, appearing at the 1953 and 1954 Prades festivals, and in South America, the USSR, Israel and Japan; he also played as a soloist with every important orchestra in the USA. Joseph Fuchs performed a series of recitals with pianist Artur Balsam in 1956 for the Peabody Mason Concert series in Boston.

A Ford Foundation grant in 1960 enabled him to commission Walter Piston’s Second Violin Concerto, the première of which he gave that year in Pittsburgh. Fuchs also gave the first performances of concertos by Lopatnikoff (1944–5), Ben Weber (1954) and Mario Peragallo (1955); of Martinů’s Madrigals for violin and viola, dedicated to Fuchs and his sister Lillian (1947); of the revised version of Vaughan Williams’s Violin Sonata, with Artur Balsam (1969); and of the posthumous American première of Martinů’s Sonata for two violins and piano (1974).

Fuchs became a violin professor at the Juilliard School of Music in 1946, and in 1971 he received the Artist Teacher’s Award from the American String Teachers’ Association.

In 1979, he was a soloist with the Naumburg Orchestral Concerts, in the Naumburg Bandshell, Central Park, in the summer series.

Fuchs died in Manhattan in 1997.

He played the “Cádiz Stradivarius” violin of 1722. His style of playing was vigorous and large-scaled, with a masterful technique and a rich, warm tone. A clear example of all this may be heard in his recording of Stravinsky's Duo Concertant (Decca, with Leo Smit).

== Sources ==
- J. Creighton: Discopaedia of the Violin, 1889–1971 (Toronto, 1974), 226ff
- D. Rooney and R.D. Lawrence: ‘Joseph Fuchs’, The Strad, xcix (1988), 896–904
- M. Campbell: Obituary, The Independent (18 March 1997)
