= William Kroll =

American violinist and composer

William Kroll (/kroʊl/; 30 January 1901 – 10 March 1980) was an American violinist and composer. His most famous composition is Banjo and Fiddle for violin and piano.

== Biography ==
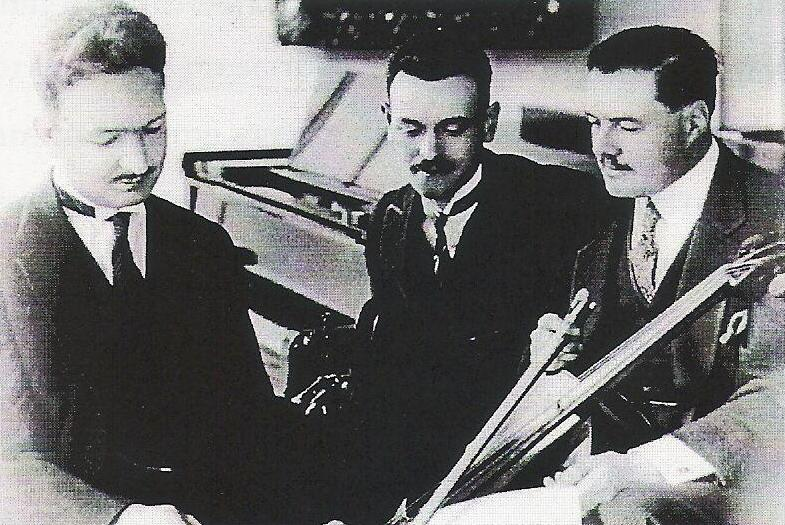
"The Elschuco Trio", in 1929: pianist Aurelio Giorni, violinist William Kroll, cellist Willem Willeke.

William Kroll was born in New York City and died in Boston, Massachusetts. Kroll greatly contributed to music during his day, both as a soloist and as a member of various intimate chamber ensembles. From 1911 to 1914 he was a student of Henri Marteau at the Berlin Hochschule für Musik. During the time he was a pupil of Franz Kneisel and P. Goetschius at the Institute of Musical Art (1917–1922), he made his professional debut in New York. After completing his schooling, he toured parts of Europe, North, and Central America as a soloist and a member of the Elshuco Trio (1922–1929), the Coolidge Quartet (1936–1944), and the Kroll Quartet (1944–1969). In the midst of his performance schedule, he taught at various facilities, first at the Institute of Musical Art (1922–1938), then at the Mannes College (1943), the Peabody Conservatory (1948–1967), Tanglewood (as of 1949), the Cleveland Institute of Music (1964–1967), and also at Queens College beginning in 1969. After moving to Boston he taught chamber music at Boston University until his death in 1980. Composer Awilda Villarini was one of his students.

== Selected compositions ==
Orchestra

- Arabesque
- Jolly Good Fellow
- Little March

String quartet

- Four Bagatelles for string quartet (published 1943)

1. Coquette
2. Giocoso
3. The Veiled Picture
4. Mood

- Four Characteristic Pieces for string quartet (published 1935)

1. Little March
2. Magyar
3. The Ancient (Based on a Hebrew Melody)
4. Cossack

Violin and piano

- Arabesque (published 1945)
- Banjo and Fiddle (published 1945)
- Bizarresque (published 1928)
- Caprice (published 1949)
- Cossack (published 1929)
- Happy-Go-Lucky (published 1949)
- Juanita (published 1945)
- Moment Musical (published 1949)
- Out of the East (published 1927)
- Pantomime (published 1937)
- Polka for violin and piano accompaniment or optional violin accompaniment (published 1949)
- Prayer (published 1945)
- Russian Lullaby (published 1927)
- Three Violin Pieces in the First Position with piano accompaniment or optional violin accompaniment (published 1945)

1. Donkey Doodle
2. Contra Dance
3. Peter Rabbit

- Valse Tendre (published 1930)
