= Dublin International Piano Festival =

Annual workshop in Ireland

The Dublin International Piano Festival and Summer Academy, also known as DIPF, is an annual 11-day intensive workshop for pianists of all ages held in Rathgar, a suburb of Dublin, Ireland.

The festival takes place in July and offers 18 spots for students from all over the world to enjoy lessons, masterclasses, seminars, and concerts from both their peers and the faculty. Founded in 2012 by Rhona Gouldson and Archie Chen, DIPF was created in order to answer the call for a "quality holistic program of piano" in Dublin. Regular faculty include international concert pianists Evelyne Brancart and Edmund Battersby (both Indiana University), Lance Coburn (Royal Irish Academy of Music), and Artistic Director Archie Chen (Piano Academy of Ireland). Guest faculty have in the past included John O'Conor, Artur Pizarro, and HJ Lim, and in 2016 will include Orla McDonagh. Hosted by the Piano Academy of Ireland, students at the festival stay in a guesthouse together in the heart of Rathgar and perform in the National Concert Hall and the Hugh Lane Gallery.

In 2015, French journalist Pierre Fougerat produced Pianos of Dublin, a documentary about the Festival & Summer Academy from the perspectives of the participants and faculty.
