= Lillian Fuchs =

American violist and composer (1901–1995)

Lillian Fuchs (November 18, 1901 – October 5, 1995) was an American violist, teacher and composer. She is considered to be among the finest instrumentalists of her time. She came from a musical family, and her brothers, Joseph Fuchs, a violinist, and Harry Fuchs, a cellist, performed with her on various recordings.

== Early life and education ==
Born into a musical family in New York City, Lillian Fuchs's brothers were violinist Joseph Fuchs and cellist Harry Fuchs. She began her musical studies as a pianist, later studying violin with her father and afterwards with Franz Kneisel (former concertmaster of the Boston Symphony Orchestra and first violinist of the Kneisel Quartet) at the Institute of Musical Art, now the Juilliard School. She also studied music composition with Percy Goetschius at that institution.

== Career ==
Fuchs enjoyed a distinguished teaching career at the Manhattan School of Music, the Juilliard School, the Aspen Music Festival and School, and the Blue Hill Music School, which she founded with her brother Joseph. Martha Strongin Katz, James Wendell Griffith, Geraldine Walther, Lawrence Dutton and Yizhak Schotten were her students. Her books of etudes for the viola (Twelve Caprices for Viola, Fifteen Characteristic Studies for Viola, and Sixteen Fantasy Etudes) are in standard use today in universities and music schools around the world, and were much appreciated by the great Scottish violist, William Primrose. She also composed a Sonata Pastorale for solo viola.

She performed many standard and non-standard pieces in the viola repertoire, including significant 20th century works. Fuchs was known for her warm, beautiful tone, expert musicianship and technical mastery. She owned a fine instrument made by Matteo Goffriller (1659–1742) and was the lifelong custodian of another lovely viola, darker in tone, by Gasparo da Salò (1540–1609). She played with a bow made by the English bow maker, John Dodd (1752–1839), which sold in May 2014 for $22,800 at Tarisio Auctions. Dodd bows are often shorter than other viola bows, a quality Fuchs prized for the greater control it permitted and also for its sheer practicality, since she was of diminutive stature. She used a gut 'A' string, considering it a sacrilege to use a metal 'A' string on an old Italian instrument. Both of her violas were about 16 inches in size, and both were also passed on to Lillian's granddaughter, Jeanne Abby Mallow.

Lillian Fuchs made her New York début on the violin in 1926, but soon switched to viola at the urging of Franz Kneisel (she was once heard to say, much to the great surprise of the auditors present, that it had never been her idea to play the viola, as she considered the instrument to be too big for her!). She thereafter was a founding member of the Perolé Quartet, playing viola with this ensemble from 1925 to 1945. She collaborated with the Budapest and Amadeus String Quartets (see below) and often appeared in performance with her brothers Joseph, a violinist and Harry, a cellist. Later, she formed the Lillian Fuchs Trio with her twin daughters. She played in a number of chamber groups, notably the Musicians Guild, and appeared as a soloist with major orchestras, including the New York Philharmonic and the Casals Festival Orchestra. In 1947, Bohuslav Martinů composed and dedicated his 'Madrigals' for violin and viola to Lillian and Joseph Fuchs after hearing them perform the Mozart Duos at Town Hall in New York City.

A renowned teacher of viola, Fuchs was also an important teacher of chamber music, counting among her pupils Isaac Stern, Pinchas Zukerman, Dorothy DeLay, Rosemary Glyde, and many others. Lillian Fuchs's influence can be seen in her two daughters, Barbara Stein Mallow, cellist, Carol Stein Amado (deceased), violinist, her granddaughter, Jeanne Abby Mallow, violist and violinist, and grandson, David Amado, conductor.

== Recordings ==
Most of her vinyl recordings are now collector's items. Many can be found on EBay, but are otherwise unavailable commercially. DoReMi Records has recently re-released a CD version of her 1950's recordings of the Bach Cello Suites. Her interpretation of the sixth suite (originally written for a five stringed instrument, the viola pomposa) made such an impression on Pablo Casals, that after a private performance, he (as told by Miss Fuchs) said to her that it sounded better on the viola than on the cello. She was the first to perform and record the Bach Suites for the viola. She used her Matteo Goffriller viola in recording all 6 suites. The microphone was placed under her instrument due to the amazing resonance.

A complete list of her studio recordings (issued and unissued) and a partial list of archive recordings :

- Johann Sebastian Bach Complete Cello Suites. Lillian Fuchs, viola. (Doremi CD DHR-7801)
- Johann Sebastian Bach Suite No. 1 in G major, Suite No. 3 in C major. Lillian Fuchs, viola. (Decca LP DL 9914)
- Johann Sebastian Bach Suite No. 6 in D major, Suite No. 2 in d minor. Lillian Fuchs, viola. (Decca LP DL 9544)
- Johann Sebastian Bach Suite No. 4 in E♭ major, Suite No. 5 in c minor. Lillian Fuchs, viola. (Decca LP DL 9660)
- Johann Sebastian Bach Suite No. 2 in d minor. Lillian Fuchs, viola. Live recital recorded on March 28, 1958 at the Harvard Musical Association (in the sound archives of the Harvard Musical Association)
- Ludwig van Beethoven Serenade in D major for Flute, Violin, and Viola, Op. 25. Julius Baker, flute, Joseph Fuchs, violin, Lillian Fuchs, viola. (Decca LP DL 9574)
- Ludwig van Beethoven Serenade in D major for Violin, Viola, and Cello, Op. 8. Joseph Fuchs, violin, Lillian Fuchs, viola, Leonard Rose, cello. (Decca LP DL 7506)
- Ludwig van Beethoven String Quintet in C major, op. 29. Toshiya Eto, Lea Foli, violins; Lillian Fuchs, Rolf Persinger, violas; Leopold Teraspulsky, cello. Recorded on July 21, 1967 at the Aspen Amphitheater, Aspen Music Festival, Aspen, Colorado (Archive of the Pitkin County Library, Aspen, Colorado)
- Ludwig van Beethoven Trio in c minor, Op. 9, No. 3. Joseph Fuchs, violin, Lillian Fuchs, viola, Harry Fuchs, cello. (Decca LP DL 9574)
- Hector Berlioz Harold en Italie. Lillian Fuchs, viola. Live concert recorded in Carnegie Hall on February 20, 1968 with the National Orchestral Association, John Manley Barnett, conductor (see Léon Barzin). National Orchestral Association collection of rehearsal and concert recordings (1938–1968) at the Rodgers and Hammerstein Archives of Recorded Sound (New York Public Library for the Performing Arts)
- Johannes Brahms Piano Quartet No. 1 in G minor, op. 25. Joseph Fuchs, violin, Lillian Fuchs, viola, Harry Fuchs, cello, Artur Balsam, piano. (recorded on September 28–30, 1953 - Unissued recording. A limited number of private pressings were made.)
- Johannes Brahms Piano Quartet No. 1 in G minor, op. 25. Jeaneane Dowis, piano, Sidney Harth, violin, Lillian Fuchs, viola, Leopold Teraspulsky, cello. Recorded on August 14, 1972 at the Aspen Amphitheater, Aspen Music Festival, Aspen, Colorado (Archive of the Pitkin County Library, Aspen, Colorado)
- Johannes Brahms Piano Quartet No. 2 in A major, op. 26. Joseph Fuchs, violin, Lillian Fuchs, viola, Harry Fuchs, cello, Artur Balsam, piano. (recorded on October 1 and 2, 1953 - Unissued recording. A limited number of private pressings were made.)
- Johannes Brahms Piano Quartet No. 3 in c minor, op. 60. Joseph Fuchs, violin, Lillian Fuchs, viola, Harry Fuchs, cello, Artur Balsam, piano. (recorded on October 4, 1955 - Unissued recording. A limited number of private pressings were made.)
- Johannes Brahms String Quintet in G major, op. 111. Netherlands String Quartet (Nap De Klijn, Jaap Schröder Violins; Paul Godwin Viola, Carel Van Leeuwen, Cello) & Lillian Fuchs, viola. Recorded July 13, 1966 at the Aspen Amphitheater, Aspen Music Festival, Aspen, Colorado (Archive of the Pitkin County Library, Aspen, Colorado)
- Johannes Brahms String Sextet in G major, op. 36. Sidney Harth, Teresa Harth, violins; Lillian Fuchs, Abraham Skernick, violas; Zara Nelsova, Leopold Teraspulsky, cellos. Recorded on August July 24, 1965 at the Aspen Amphitheater, Aspen Music Festival, Aspen, Colorado (Archive of the Pitkin County Library, Aspen, Colorado)
- Johannes Brahms Sonata in F minor for viola & piano Op.120 no. 1. Lillian Fuchs, viola, Edward Mobbs, piano. Live recital recorded on March 28, 1958 at the Harvard Musical Association (in the sound archives of the Harvard Musical Association)
- Claude Debussy Sonata for Flute, Viola, and Harp. Julius Baker, flute, Lillian Fuchs, viola, Laura Newell, harp. (Decca LP DL 9777)
- Antonín Dvořák Piano Quartet in E-flat major, op. 87. Donald Weilerstein, violin, Lillian Fuchs, viola, Laszlo Varga, cello, Rudolf Firkušný, piano. Recorded on June 28, 1976 at the Aspen Amphitheater, Aspen Music Festival, Aspen, Colorado (Archive of the Pitkin County Library, Aspen, Colorado)
- William Flackton Sonata in G major for Viola. Lillian Fuchs, viola. Live recital recorded on March 28, 1958 at the Harvard Musical Association (in the sound archives of the Harvard Musical Association)
- Lillian Fuchs Sonata Pastorale. Lillian Fuchs, viola. Recorded on January 2, 4 & 17 1957. (Decca LP MG5414/5)
- Bohuslav Martinů Three Madrigals for Violin and Viola. Joseph Fuchs, violin, Lillian Fuchs, viola. (Decca LP DL 8510)
- Bohuslav Martinů Rhapsodie-Concerto. Lillian Fuchs, viola. Live concert recorded in Carnegie Hall on March 6, 1962 with the National Orchestral Association, John Barnett, conductor. National Orchestral Association collection of rehearsal and concert recordings (1938–1968) at the Rodgers and Hammerstein Archives of Recorded Sound (New York Public Library for the Performing Arts)
- Bohuslav Martinů Viola Sonata. Lillian Fuchs, viola. Recorded on February 4, 1957. (Decca LP MG5414/5)
- Jacques de Menasce Sonata for Viola and Piano (1955). Lillian Fuchs, viola, Artur Balsam, piano. (Decca LP MG5414/5 and CRI LP CRI 154)
- Jacques de Menasce Sonata for Viola and Piano (1955). Lillian Fuchs, viola, Edward Mobbs, piano. Live recital recorded on March 28, 1958 at the Harvard Musical Association (in the sound archives of the Harvard Musical Association)
- Darius Milhaud Sonata no. 1 for viola & piano (1944). Lillian Fuchs, viola, Edward Mobbs, piano. Live recital recorded on March 28, 1958 at the Harvard Musical Association (in the sound archives of the Harvard Musical Association)
- Wolfgang Amadeus Mozart Divertimento for String Trio in Eb, K.563. Joseph Fuchs, violin, Lillian Fuchs, viola, Paul Tortelier, cello. (Koch CD 3-7004-2)
- Wolfgang Amadeus Mozart Duos for Violin and Viola, K423, K.424. Joseph Fuchs, violin, Lillian Fuchs, viola. (Columbia LP MS 6292/ML 5692)
- Wolfgang Amadeus Mozart Duo No. 2 in Bb, K.424. Joseph Fuchs, violin, Lillian Fuchs, viola. (Decca LP DL 8510)
- Wolfgang Amadeus Mozart Piano Quartet in E-flat major, K. 493. Robert Mann, violin, Lillian Fuchs, viola, Leopold Teraspulsky, cello, Claude Frank, piano. Recorded on July 28, 1973 at the Aspen Amphitheater, Aspen Music Festival, Aspen, Colorado (Archive of the Pitkin County Library, Aspen, Colorado)
- Wolfgang Amadeus Mozart String Quintet in C major, K.515 Amadeus Quartet (Norbert Brainin, Siegmund Nissel, Peter Schidlof, Martin Lovett) & Lillian Fuchs, viola. Recorded on July 14, 1965 at the Aspen Amphitheater, Aspen Music Festival, Aspen, Colorado (Archive of the Pitkin County Library, Aspen, Colorado)
- Wolfgang Amadeus Mozart Trio in Eb for Clarinet, Viola, and Piano, K498 "Kegelstatt". Reginald Kell, clarinet, Lillian Fuchs, viola, Mieczysław Horszowski, piano. (Decca LP 9543, Deutsche Grammophon CD 000480602)
- Wolfgang Amadeus Mozart Sinfonia Concertante in Eb, K364. Joseph Fuchs, violin, Lillian Fuchs, viola, Aeterna Chamber Orchestra, Frederic Waldman, conductor. (Decca LP DL 710037)
- Wolfgang Amadeus Mozart Sinfonia Concertante in Eb, K364. Joseph Fuchs, violin, Lillian Fuchs, viola, Zimbler Sinfonietta. (Deutsche Grammophon LP LPE 17 124)
- Wolfgang Amadeus Mozart Sinfonia Concertante in Eb, K365. Joseph Fuchs, violin, Lillian Fuchs, viola, Prades Festival Orchestra, Pablo Casals, conductor. (Koch CD 3-7004-2)
- Wolfgang Amadeus Mozart Sinfonia Concertante in Eb, K364. Joseph Fuchs, violin, Lillian Fuchs, viola, New York Philharmonic Orchestra, Rafael Kubelik, conductor. Live concert recorded on February 23, 1958 in Carnegie Hall.
- Albert Roussel Trio for Flute, Viola, and Cello, Op. 40. Julius Baker, flute, Lillian Fuchs, viola, Harry Fuchs, cello. (Decca LP DL 9777)
- Franz Schubert Piano Quintet in A major, opus posthumous 114, D. 667, "Trout". Lea Foli, violin, Lillian Fuchs, viola, Claus Adam, cello, David Walter, bass, Brooks Smith, piano. Recorded August 21, 1976 at the Aspen Amphitheater, Aspen Music Festival, Aspen, Colorado (Archive of the Pitkin County Library, Aspen, Colorado).
- Virgil Thomson Sonata da Chiesa (1926). Lillian Fuchs, viola, Peter Simenauer, clarinet, Fred Mills, trumpet, Paul Ingraham, horn, Edward Erwin, trombone, Virgil Thomson, conductor. (CRI LP 207, Hi-Fi/Stereo Review LP)
- Ralph Vaughan Williams Flos Campi. Lillian Fuchs, viola. Live concert recorded in Carnegie Hall on February 20, 1968 with the National Orchestral Association, John Barnett, conductor and the Mannes School of Music Chorus, Harold Aks, director (see Mannes College The New School for Music. National Orchestral Association collection of rehearsal and concert recordings (1938–1968) at the Rodgers and Hammerstein Archives of Recorded Sound (New York Public Library for the Performing Arts)

== Sources ==
- Broe, Carolyn. Progressive Etudes for the Viola. (Retrieved July 31, 2006.)
- Ronai, Laura. Review of the recently re-released Bach Suites. (Retrieved January 22, 2006).
- DoReMi Records Website. (Retrieved January 22, 2006).
- Mallow, Jeanne Website. (Retrieved January 22, 2006).
- Pinnolis, Judith, Contributions of Jewish Women to Music and of Women to Jewish Music (Retrieved July 23, 2007).
- Oestreich, James R. (October 7, 1995). "Lillian Fuchs, 91, Violist and Teacher From Family of Musicians". The New York Times.
- Williams, Amadee Daryl. Lillian Fuchs, First Lady of the Viola (Studies in the History and Interpretation of Music). Published by Edwin Mellen Press, 1994.
