= Robert Rubel =

American football coach

Current position
- Title: Head coach
- Team: Robinson HS (TX)

Playing career
- 1988–1992: Midwestern State
- Positions: Quarterback, punter

Coaching career (HC unless noted)
- 2000–2001: Cisco (AHC/DC)
- 2002: North Dakota Science (DC)
- 2004–2005: Abilene Christian (assistant)
- 2006: Tabor
- 2008: East Central (DC)
- 2018–2019: Robinson HS (TX) (DC)
- 2020–present: Robinson HS (TX)

Head coaching record
- Overall: 6–4 (college)

Robert Rubel is an American football coach. He was the former head football coach at Robinson High School in Robinson, Texas, a position he has held from 2020 up until 2021. Rubel served as the head football coach at Tabor College in Hillsboro, Kansas for one season, in 2006. Rubel had interviewed for the head position at Texas A&M University–Kingsville, considered to be one of the more prestigious coaching opportunities in NCAA Division II In his one season as head coach at Tabor, the team accomplished a record of 6–4. Rubel was only the second coach in school history to have a winning record in his first season.

Rubel is known as a defensive coach and has long been a proponent of the 46 defense. At Cisco College he had the 13th-ranked defense in the nation, giving up 278 yards per game. Cisco also ranked third nationally in turnovers with 35, and first in interceptions with 21. At North Dakota State College of Science (NDSCS), his defense ranked ninth nationally with 227 yards per game, and helped NDSCS to a Graphic Edge Bowl win. At Tabor, the defense was ranked 12th in the nation in rush defense at 88 yards per game, 24th in total defense at 262 yards per game, and 26th in scoring defense at 19 points per game, while breaking the school record for defensive touchdowns. At Buffalo High School, the defense was first in the district in scoring defense and fourth in the region, taking the team to its first playoff win in 55 years, and first 10-win season in 56 years.

Rubel was an assistant coach and defensive coordinator at East Central University in Ada, Oklahoma. He also was an assistant coach at Abilene Christian University in Abilene, Texas.

== Head coaching record ==
=== College ===
Year	Team	Overall	Conference	Standing	Bowl/playoffs
Tabor Bluejays (Kansas Collegiate Athletic Conference) (2006)
2006	Tabor	6–4	5–4	5th	
Tabor:		6–4	5–4		
Total:		6–4			
