= Edith Rubel =

American violinist

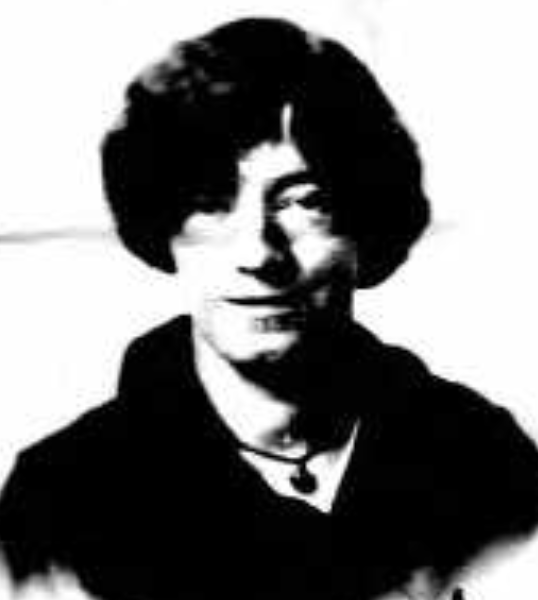
- Edith Rubel, from a 1918 passport application
- Born: Edith Mary Rubel; December 29, 1884; Lebanon, Kentucky, U.S.
- Died: February 9, 1952 (age 67); Louisville, Kentucky, U.S.
- Other names: Edie Mapother
- Occupation: Violinist
- Known for: Edith Rubel Trio (1915–1919)

Edith Mary Rubel Mapother (December 29, 1884 – February 9, 1952) was an American violinist, educator, and writer from Kentucky. She was leader of the Edith Rubel Trio during World War I, with cellists Vera Poppe and Marie Roemaet Rosanoff and pianists Brenda Putnam and Katharine Swift. She later taught at the University of Louisville School of Music.

== Early life and education ==
Rubel was born in Lebanon, Kentucky, the daughter of John Applegate Rubel and Ann Serena Heffernan Rubel. She studied at the Cincinnati College of Music, and in Berlin, but her German studies were interrupted by the beginning of World War I.

== Career ==
Rubel was leader of the Edith Rubel Trio, which gave its debut performances in late 1915 at Aeolian Hall in New York, and with the Motet Choral Society in Washington, D.C. Her first trio partners were cellist Vera Poppe and pianist Brenda Putnam; they were later replaced by cellist Marie Roemaet and pianist Katharine Swift. The trio gave a joint recital with baritone Harold Land in 1916, played at Aeolian Hall again in 1917, and performed in Rochester in 1917 and 1918. "Edith Rubel must be commended again for her clever insight into the realm of ensemble playing," reported the Musical Courier in 1917, "for she has given to the world an unique and delightful organization."

Rubel toured as a violin soloist in the United States and in France in 1918 and 1919. She performed at the 1931 meeting of the Kentucky Federation of Music Clubs. She taught at the University of Louisville School of Music in the 1930s, and lectured on "Cultural Louisville" in 1935. She played for a meeting of the Kentucky Folk-Lore Society in 1939. She wrote a whimsical illustrated history of music, The Merry Muse (1937), and a novel, Dark Darragh (1943). The latter book was based on her travels in Ireland, hoping to gain an inheritance for her son. During World War II, she played for troops stationed at Fort Knox. "Music is a friendly thing," she told an interviewer in 1938. "Most people drag it out of mothballs on special occasions like a silk hat or party frock."

== Publications ==
- "How to Acquire and Retain a Repertoire" (1918)
- The Merry Muse: Heydays of Music and Art (1937, illustrated by Harvey Peake)
- Dark Darragh (1943, novel)

== Personal life ==
Rubel married businessman Dillon Edward Mapother in 1920. They had three sons, Dillon, John, and James. Her husband died in 1933, and she died in 1952, at the age of 67, in Louisville, Kentucky.
