= Kay Swift =

American songwriter (1897–1993)

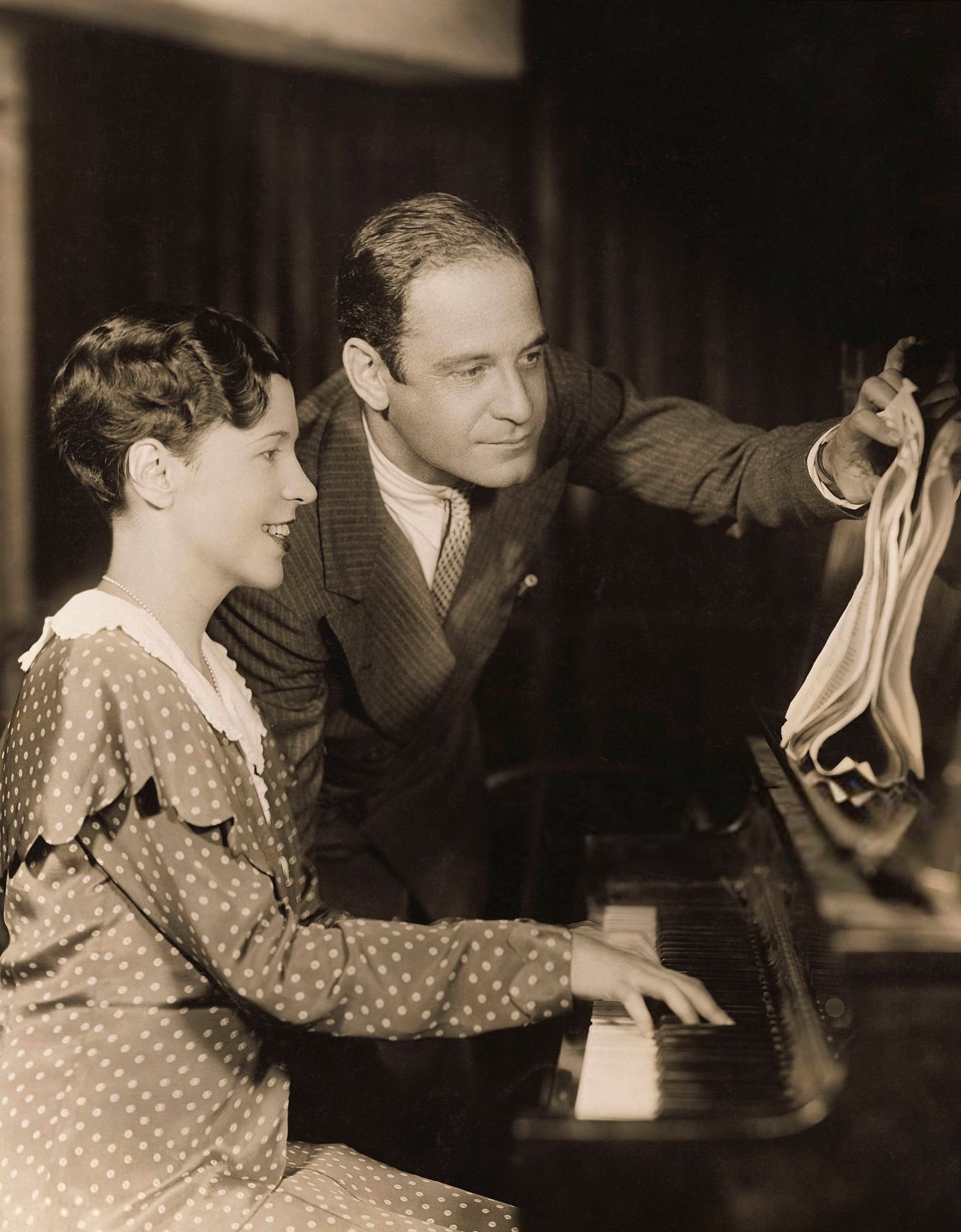
- Swift and her husband James Warburg photographed by Florence Vandamm for Vanity Fair, November 1930

Background information
- Born: Katharine Faulkner Swift; April 19, 1897; New York City, U.S.
- Died: January 28, 1993 (aged 95) Southington, Connecticut, U.S.
- Occupation: Composer
- Years active: 1930–91
- Spouses: James Paul Warburg (m. 1918; div. 1934) Faye Hubbard (m. 1939; div. 1946) Hunter Galloway (m. 1947; div. 1968)
- Children: 3
- Relatives: Katharine Weber (granddaughter) John Paul Kaufman (grandson)

Katharine Faulkner "Kay" Swift (April 19, 1897 – January 28, 1993) was an American composer of popular and classical music, the first woman to score a hit musical completely. Written in 1930, the Broadway musical Fine and Dandy includes some of her best known songs; the song "Fine and Dandy" has become a jazz standard. "Can't We Be Friends?" (1929) was her biggest hit song.

Swift also arranged some of the music of George Gershwin posthumously, such as the prelude "Sleepless Night" (1946).

== Biography ==
Katharine Faulkner Swift was born to English American Samuel Shippen Swift, a music critic, and Ellen Faulkner of England in New York City. Her father died when she was 17. Swift was educated at the Veltin School for Girls and then trained as a classical musician and composer at the Institute of Musical Art (today the Juilliard School), where she studied piano with Bertha Tapper. Her teacher of composition was Charles Martin Loeffler, while harmony and composition were taught to her by Percy Goetschius.

Swift played professionally with the Edith Rubel Trio. While performing at a social event, she met the sister of her future husband, who arranged their meeting. James Paul "Jimmy" Warburg was a banker, member of a distinguished Jewish family who had made a fortune in banking. Swift was Christian, and Warburg's parents had accepted their marriage, but an uncle by marriage Jacob Schiff objected to it. Warburg—using the pen name of Paul James—wrote lyrics for Swift's melodies, an extension of his poetry writing which was a family tradition. Swift had three children by Warburg between 1919 and 1924. She was grandmother to the novelist Katharine Weber.

Before meeting George Gershwin in 1925, her musical background was classical, though she was a great fan of the songs of Irving Berlin. Gershwin—who had coined her nickname "Kay"— encouraged her interest in popular music and her writing in that vein. He frequently consulted Swift about his musicals and other works, and she became a trusted musical advisor.

After she met George Gershwin, he and Swift were more and more frequently seen together. Her husband Jimmy, frequently out of town on business, was tolerant, later saying that he liked Gershwin although he had some resentment toward the "self-centered genius" who had interfered with his life. Swift and Warburg's marriage ended in divorce in 1934. Gershwin and Swift's affair lasted over ten years in all, until his death in 1937. Despite their long relationship, Kay and George never married, perhaps because, as her granddaughter Katharine Weber has suggested, Gershwin's mother Rose was unhappy that she was not Jewish. In any case, his reluctance was not unfamiliar to his family and friends—Ira Gershwin thought George was too uncomfortable with children, others thought he was too self-centered to ever marry or simply preferred not to. As the couple entered a nightclub one evening, Oscar Levant reportedly announced, "Ah, look! Here comes George Gershwin with the future Miss Kay Swift." Before their 1930 hit show Fine and Dandy, Kay Swift and Paul James contributed numbers to The First Little Show ("Can't We Be Friends?") and The Garrick Gaieties. In 1934 Swift composed a ballet for George Balanchine entitled Alma Mater, which marked Balanchine's first original work with an American setting.

After Gershwin's death in 1937, Ira Gershwin collaborated with Swift to complete and arrange some of his unpublished works. He said that she knew almost all of George's music, "had taken down sketches as he composed [...] and had total musical recall."

Swift was staff composer at Radio City Music Hall where she wrote musical numbers for The Rockettes, and was Director of Light Music for the 1939 World's Fair.

Swift met cowboy Faye Hubbard at the World's Fair rodeo, "The American Jubilee", and eloped with him two weeks later. Her 1943 book about life on his Oregon ranch, "Who Could Ask For Anything More?" was made into the 1950 movie Never a Dull Moment, which featured Fred MacMurray as the cowboy and Irene Dunne as Kay.

In 1952, Kay Swift provided the score for Cornelia Otis Skinner's one-woman Broadway show Paris '90. Paris '90 was first performed on a road trip that began on January 11, 1952. Nathaniel Shilkret directed an orchestra consisting of Kay Swift playing piano, Irving Becker playing violin and the remaining musicians hired locally in each city. The complete sound track was recorded on March 4, 1952, and issued by Columbia as LP 4619. Shilkret said "Kay Swift, a splendid composer, wrote the music, and Russell Bennett arranged it for eleven men."

Swift's compositions during 1970s represent a classical style. She composed both secular and sacred music continuing from 1960s throughout the 1970s. She added "Shoana" to her cycle of children's songs honoring her great granddaughter who was born in year 1970. In early 1970s, she composed "Man, Have Pity on Man" for solo voice. Swift used text, based on Ursula Vaughan Williams's poem for "Man, Have Pity on Man" which was the eighth poem in a nine-poem sequence about the story of Noah's Ark. This work was performed with orchestra in 1972.

This had harsh dissonances which is unusual for Swift's works, the poetic meaning of the composition's text which is about the remains of world after the forces of destruction. According to Vicki Ohl, this poetic idea is portrayed by Swift's parallel triads with no exact tonal center which go through keys of B flat, C, A, and G major.

Swift began a sacred song in 1972 emphasizing peace and rejoicing however it was left unfinished. Same year she composed "The Bee Song", based on a Carolyn Kramer's poem. Even though its melody and text are complete, the accompaniment remained in sketch form. There are meter shifts and key changes in this song and incorporates a quotation from Wagner's "Bridal Chorus" to showcase a romance between two bees.

Swift's unfinished “Yes, I Shall” (1972), for trombone and orchestra has two large sections with seventy-five measures. This composition is existing in keyboard score with notations indicating planned orchestration. Her piano piece "New Tune" (1973) was the middle section of “Yes, I Shall” (1972), which was transposed from E major to F major.

Her last commissioned show was Dr. Rush Pays a House Call, made for American Medical Association celebration in 1974. This drama was centered on the four physicians who signed the declaration of independence with surgeon general Dr. Benjamin Rush of the Continental Army. While there were no lyrics, Swift composed incidental and background music for this drama and Robert Russell Bennett orchestrated and conducted music.

Gershwin biographers including Lawrence Stewart, Robert Kimball and Edward Jablonski consulted Swift for her musical knowledge and association with Gershwin. Most of her professional life is centered around her understanding and knowledge of George Gershwin's music and her personal association with him. In 1971, Louise Carlyle and Swift presented a medley from The Shocking Miss Pilgrim as a concert event "The Gershwin Years". This was staged at Lincoln Center by the American Academy of Dramatic Arts.

Her later years were devoted to transcribing, performing, and annotating Gershwin's music, which she did until being diagnosed with Alzheimer's disease in 1991. On January 28, 1993, she died at the Alzheimer's Resource Center in Southington, Connecticut at the age of 95.
