= Sascha Jacobsen =

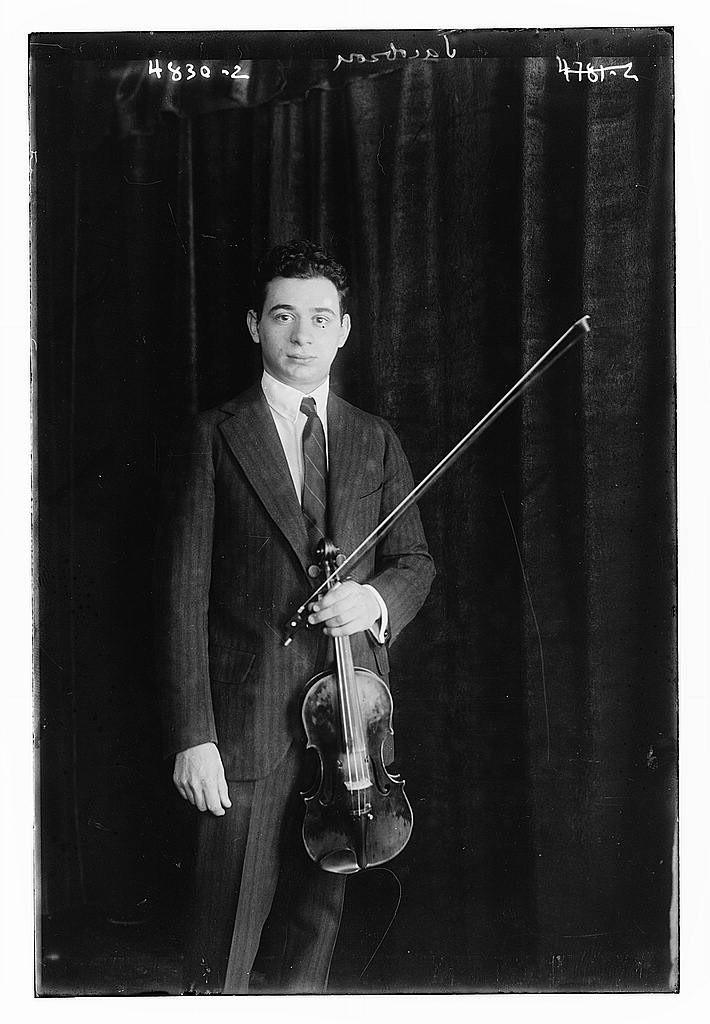
Sascha Jacobsen in 1919

Sascha Jacobsen (11 December [O.S. 29 November] 1895 - 19 March 1972) was an American violinist and teacher. Born in Helsinki, Grand Duchy of Finland (then part of the Russian Empire), he grew up in St. Petersburg, then moved with his family to New York City as a boy.

== Biography ==
He was born on 11 December 1895 in Helsinki, Grand Duchy of Finland, which was then an autonomous state within the Russian Empire.

He graduated from the Juilliard School in New York in 1915 as a pupil of Franz Kneisel, and on graduation received the Morris Loeb Memorial Award. He founded the Musical Art Quartet, which was active from 1927 to 1933 and made a distinguished early-electric Columbia 78-rpm recording of Haydn's great Quartet in C major, Op. 54, No. 2, which may have been the first complete recording of any Haydn quartet. While in this quartet he played Felix M. Warburg's "Titian" Stradivarius. Later he taught at Juilliard; among his pupils were Julius Hegyi Lynn Blakeslee and Zvi Zeitlin.

In the 1950s Jacobsen served as concertmaster in the Los Angeles Philharmonic under Alfred Wallenstein. He played the Red Diamond Stradivarius violin (see the story about its loss and restoration at ).

He died on 19 March 1972 in Costa Mesa, California.

== Legacy ==
Jacobsen is one of the subjects of George Gershwin's 1922 song "Mischa, Jascha, Toscha, Sascha". Sascha also gave violin lessons to his dear friend Albert Einstein, and recorded on RCA Victor 78s the Chausson Concerto in D major for Violin, Piano and String Quartet with Jascha Heifetz, Jesus Maria Sanroma, and the Musical Art Quartet of which he was the leader.
