= Franz Kneisel =

Violinist and music teacher (1865–1926)

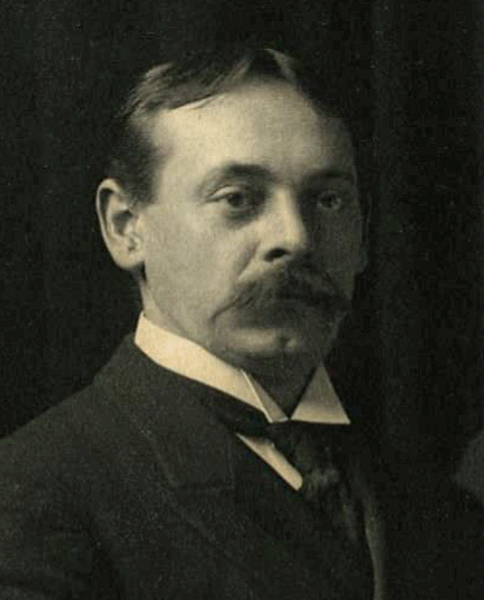
Franz Kneisel in 1902 or 1903

Franz Kneisel (January 26, 1865, Bucharest – March 26, 1926, New York) was a violinist, conductor, and music teacher.

He completed early musical training at the Bucharest Conservatory and moved to Vienna in 1879, where he studied at the Vienna Conservatory under Jakob Grün and became friends with Brahms.

At 18 he was concertmaster of the Hofburg Theater in Vienna. At age 19 he took the post of concertmaster for the Bilse Orchestra in Berlin, succeeding Ysaye. Wilhelm Gericke, conductor of the relatively newly established Boston Symphony Orchestra (then only four years old), heard him during a talent acquisition trip to Europe and hired him on the spot for the same post in Boston. He replaced Bernhard Listemann in a highly controversial post. Kneisel's first performance was October 17, 1885. Two weeks later he performed as soloist in the Beethoven Violin Concerto. In 1906, when Henry Lee Higginson was searching for a new conductor for the BSO to replace Wilhelm Gericke, Kneisel advocated for Mahler.

Upon arrival in Boston, with other members of the BSO, he also founded the influential Kneisel Quartet, the first professional string quartet in America. They operated from 1885 until disbanding in 1917.

Kneisel and his quartet left the Boston Symphony Orchestra in 1903 to focus on the quartet and on teaching. They settled in 1905 at New York's Institute for Musical Art (the forerunner of the Juilliard School).

Kneisel was also an accomplished conductor. He turned down positions to conduct the Philadelphia Orchestra and the New York Philharmonic. He was one of the founders of New York's Bohemian music club.

His students included Joseph Fuchs, Lillian Fuchs, Michel Gusikoff, William Kroll, Elise Fellows White, George Rabin, Jacques Gordon, Eudice Shapiro, and three of the founding members of the Musical Art Quartet: Sascha Jacobsen, Bernard Ocko, and Louis Kaufman.

Kneisel owned a summer home in Blue Hill, Maine, where he regularly invited his students, and where many important musicians also vacationed, including Stokowski, Hofmann, Gabrilowitsch, and Kreisler. These annual summer gatherings eventually became the long-running chamber music festival Kneisel Hall.

Two of his children were accomplished violinists. His son Frank Kneisel taught at Boston Conservatory, was concertmaster of the Kansas City Symphony, conducted the Kneisel String Orchestra in New York and performed in Blue Hill. His daughter Marianne Kneisel ran the Blue Hill school for 40 years after his death. His daughter Victoria, a pianist, married his quartet cellist Willem Willeke.

Kneisel died in New York in 1926. Funeral services were held in New York and in Boston. He was buried in Boston's Forest Hill Cemetery, where honorary pallbearers included colleagues Joseph Adamowsky, George W. Chadwick, Frederick P. Cabot, and Charles A. Ellis. A bust of Kneisel by Henry H. Kitson was installed at Juilliard in 1936, the result of a memorial committee established by Frank Damrosch, Rubin Goldmark, Walter Naumburg, and Edwin Rice.

Kneisel composed one Grande Etude de Concert, a moto perpetuo for violin and piano dedicated to Lillian Bliss, and a cadenza to Brahms' concerto. He edited a handful of violin works, and several composers dedicated their quartets and violin pieces to him, including Americans Foote, Chadwick, and Loeffler, and Europeans Ornstein and Enescu.
