= Clarence N. Hickman =

American physicist (1889–1981)

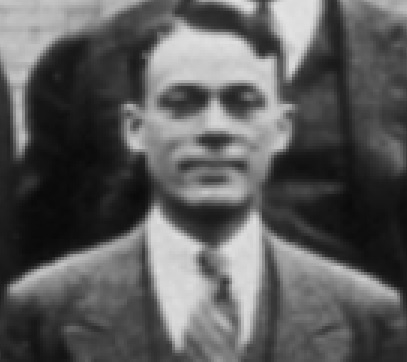
- Hickman in 1928
- Born: August 16, 1889; Farm north of Lizton, Indiana, US
- Died: May 7, 1981 (aged 91); Jackson Heights, New York, US
- Resting place: Fairview Cemetery, New Albany, Indiana
- Citizenship: United States
- Education: PhD, Physics
- Alma mater: Clark University
- Known for: Development of the bazooka, Model B Ampico piano, work with rocket pioneer Robert H. Goddard, "Father of Scientific Archery"
- Spouse: Mabel Bigwood Hickman (1891–1965)
- Awards: U.S. Medal for Merit (1948), National Archery Association's Thompson Medal of Honor (1950), Dean Emeritus, The World Archery Center (TWAC), AMICA Hall of Fame (1976)
- Scientific career
- Thesis: The alternating current resistance and inductance of single layer coils (1922)

Clarence Nichols Hickman (16 August 1889–7 May 1981) was a physicist who worked on rockets with Robert Goddard. He is known for developing the bazooka man-portable recoilless antitank rocket launcher weapon, and the American Piano Company Model B player piano. He is also known as the "Father of Scientific Archery".

== Life ==
=== Early life ===
Clarence Hickman was born on a farm established by his grandfather Leak on 16 August 1889. The nearest town was Lizton, Indiana, to the south. Clarence and his siblings attended the Leak country school until 1898, when the family moved northward to the Job Hadley farm, where the children attended another country school. In both residences, Clarence pursued an interest in archery, playing with bows and arrows made by his father. By his own account,

The arrows had heavy heads so that we did not need feathers to guide the arrow.... We boys shot fish with bows, using umbrella staves as arrows. I well remember that I could not understand why we had to aim under the fish to hit it. It was not until I attended high school, where I learned about refraction of light, that I understood this phenomenon.

In 1900 the family moved to the Mappen farm, just west of Jamestown, Indiana. While living there, Hickman developed an interest in photography and music. An acquaintance, Stanley Hendricks, owned a photographic studio in nearby Jamestown. Hickman credits Hendricks with "having a profound influence on my life at a later date".

In 1903, Hickman's father bought a 240-acre (97 ha) farm north of Martinsville, Indiana. Prior to that, the family had been renters. Hickman continued to pursue his interests in music and photography, practicing guitar and accepting payment for taking pictures. Hickman completed the 8th grade in 1904, and then took 8th grade again because there was no other school to continue his education. His parents, who wanted their children to be able to attend high school, sold the farm in 1905 and moved to another farm west of Jamestown, where Hickman attended high school. He obtained work as a professional photographer, including work as the official photographer for the Standard Oil Company. He also began working for Stanley Hendricks, who had sold his photography business and opened a clothing store in Jamestown.

=== Early career ===
In 1906, Hickman's father bought a smaller, eight-acre farm with a large house south of Jamestown, and moved his family there. By that time, the family was smaller, as two of Hickman's brothers had moved out. Hickman continued studying at the Jamestown High School as well as studying German at home. In 1908 Stanley Hendricks had opened a clothing store in Waynetown and offered Hickman a job clerking the store, along with an opportunity to complete his high school education in Waynetown. Hickman graduated from Waynetown High School in 1909 and continued clerking full-time in the clothing store until 1910, when he accepted a teaching position in the Waynetown public schools, teaching 7th and 8th grades. During this time he learned to play the clarinet, and continued his interest in magic, suspending his teaching job to give performances as "The Hoosier Magician" in churches and opera houses in Waynetown and Hillsboro.

In 1911, Hickman was offered a new teaching position at nearly double his previous salary, to teach mathematics, physics, botany, and German at Jamestown High School.

=== Education ===
Hickman received his Bachelor of Arts degree in physics and mathematics from Winona College in Winona Lake, Indiana.

In 1917, Hickman began pursuing his master's degree at Clark University in Worcester, Massachusetts. His work at the university had a focus on rocket development. At Clark, Hickman met rocket scientist Robert Goddard, who was head of Clark's physics department at the time, and with whom Hickman continued working after graduation.

=== Career ===
After graduating from Clark University, Hickman worked at the Mount Wilson Observatory with Robert Goddard, where he continued research and development on rockets intended for use during World War I. During this period, Hickman lost several fingers from his left hand and parts of fingers from his right hand due to an explosion of a rocket charge (subsequently he developed a modification to a clarinet to allow him to continue playing it). Hickman later worked for a short time demonstrating his rockets at the Aberdeen Proving Grounds, and afterward joined the Bureau of Standards, then afterward he developed submarine mines at the Washington Navy Yard.

In particular, working alongside Robert Goddard in 1918, Hickman helped develop a man-portable recoilless antitank rocket launcher (later known as the bazooka), although the war ended before finishing development of the missile. Hickman eventually did guide this development to completion during World War II.

During the 1920s, Hickman then worked for the American Piano Company (also known as Ampico), improving the company's player piano products. The inventor of the Ampico piano, Charles Fuller Stoddard, needed a physicist and mathematician to develop improvements to reproducing instruments as well as manufacturing aspects of automatic pianos. He employed Hickman in this role at a research laboratory that Ampico established in 1924 at the Chickering Hall in New York. Hickman's work enabled the development of Ampico's dynamic recording machine and the Model 'B' player piano. Author Larry Givens wrote:

Dr. Hickman's employment with American Piano Company, from 1924 through the end of 1929, may accurately be said to represent the only period in the history of the player piano industry in which real scientific methodology was applied to the development of the player piano. Most development work in the industry had theretofore consisted of scratch-paper sketches and empirical constructing of models with hopes that they would function!

For his achievements at Ampico, Hickman was inducted into the Automatic Musical Instruments Collector's Association Hall of Fame in 1976.

Hickman and Charles Fuller Stoddard were two of the founders of the Acoustical Society of America (ASA). He participated in ASA First Meeting along with thirty-nine other persons, at the Bell headquarters in New York City, on December 27, 1928.

When the Great Depression forced the research department to close, Hickman joined Bell Telephone Acoustical Laboratories. At Bell, he renewed his interest in the physics of archery, performing laboratory experiments and publishing several papers in archery journals. He also invented a method of making silk backing for bows. Also at Bell, Hickman developed metal tape recording, devices for analyzing speech patterns, and new methods of telephone switching.

During World War II, while in his position as director at Bell Labs, Hickman headed Section H of Division 3 (Rocket Ordnance) of the National Defense Research Committee. In that position he guided rocket development in various organizations, leading to completing the development and fielding of the bazooka in 1941, which he had started with Goddard during the First World War.

Hickman retired from Bell in 1950 and began working at the Sandia National Laboratory in Albuquerque, New Mexico, working on guided missiles. He lived in New York as a consultant to industrial companies until his death in 1981.

== Awards ==
Hickman authored numerous papers and received several awards, including:

- U.S. Medal for Merit (1948) for rocketry developments during World War II
- National Archery Association Thompson Medal of Honor (1950)
- Automatic Musical Instruments Collector's Association Hall of Fame (1976)
- John Price Wetherill Medal from The Franklin Institute for contributions in several fields including rocketry, telephony, sound recording, and archery
- Dean Emeritus, The World Archery Center (TWAC)
