= Aurelio Giorni =

Italian-American pianist, composer and pedagogue

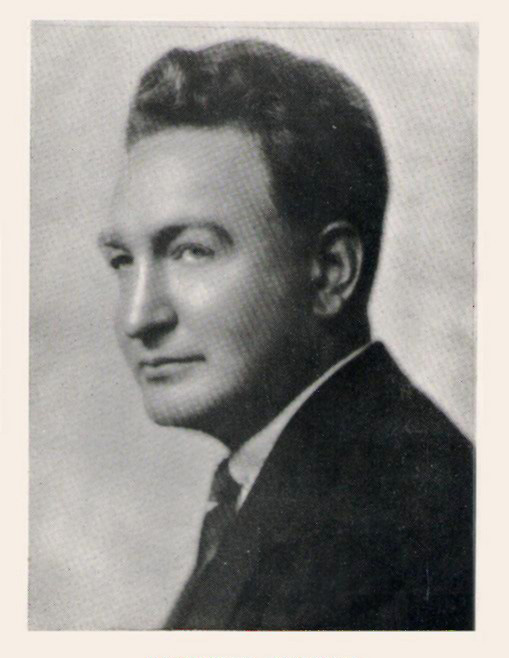
- Giorni c. 1930s

Background information
- Born: 15 September 1895; Perugia, Italy
- Died: 23 September 1938 (aged 43) Pittsfield, Massachusetts, U.S.
- Genres: Classical
- Occupations: Pianist, Composer, Pedagogue
- Instrument: Piano
- Labels: Duo-Art, Brunswick

Aurelio Carlo Pietro Teodoro Giorni (15 September 1895 – 23 September 1938) was an Italian-American pianist and composer. After emigrating to the United States in 1914, he toured the nation as a soloist and with the Elshuco Trio. He composed chamber music, orchestral music, études, as well as a sonata for piano and cello.

== Early life ==
Aurelio was born on 15 September 1895, in Perugia, Italy, the first of two sons born to Carlo Giuseppe Giorni, a Roman landscape painter, and Linda Bergner Giorni, an American mezzo-soprano. Aurelio was the great-grandson of Danish sculptor Bertel Thorvaldsen. Aurelio's parents had him tutored privately at home until, at age 13, he attended Santa Cecilia Conservatory of Music and studied piano with Maestro Giovanni Sgambati and Ferruccio Busoni from 1909 to 1911.

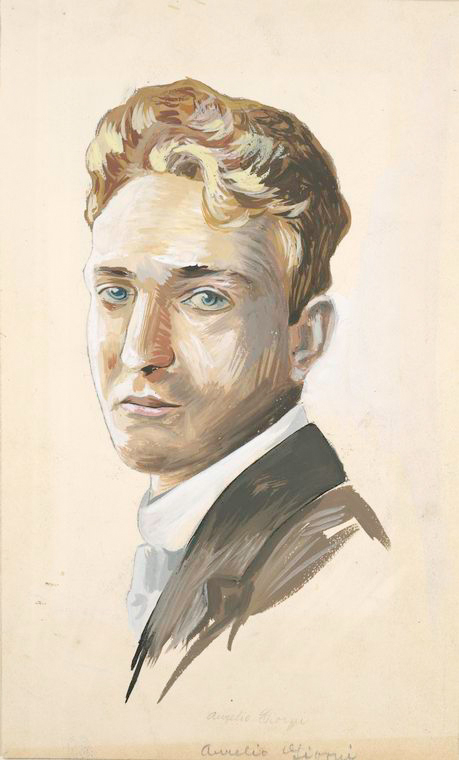
Aurelio Giorni portrait - The New York Public Library for the Performing Arts / Music Division (Muller Collection)

He performed joint recitals with his mother Linda as early as February 1908, when he was 12 years old. One such performance took place at the Hotel Excelsior in Rome on 23 March 1911. The press notice read as follows:

The Giorni Concert at the Hotel Excelsior, attracted a very large number of ladies and gentlemen who are already aware of the unusual musical gifts possessed by Madame Linda Giorni & her son, Aurelio.
All the numbers of the program were well received, and while the singing of Madame Giorni has been for several years the admiration of the Roman public, the remarkable interpretation give by Aurelio Giorni, (only 15 years old, and yet a composer of merit) added much to the novelty and interest. He played compositions by Bach, Chopin, Scarlatti and Sgambati in a manner which astonished and delighted the audience. His success was all the more marked because an unfortunate accident had happened to the piano, and the young musician was obliged to play without the use of the pedals. Madame Giorni sang arie & remanse by Haendel, Sgambati, Tschaikovsky, Brahms & Strauss, as well as compositions by Aurelio Giorni, who accompanied his mother on the piano.

Aurelio graduated from Santa Cecilia before he turned 15, enabling him to enter the Meisterschule für Komposition (Master School for Composition) in Berlin in 1911. There he studied composition with German composer Engelbert Humperdinck and Russian-born pianist, conductor, and composer Ossip Gabrilowitsch.

Aurelio was 16 when he returned to Rome to perform as a soloist. There, in 1912, Aurelio met his future wife, Helen Emerson Miller. Aurelio was known the "wonder child" of Carlo and Linda and was considered a remarkable pianist and composer at only 17 years old.

Between 1913 and 1915 he toured Germany, Switzerland, the Netherlands, and Scandinavia.

== Life in the U.S. ==
On coming to America in the fall of 1914, Aurelio first stayed with his mother's sister, Emma Bergner Sajous and her husband Charles E. de M. Sajous in Philadelphia. When he moved, it was to two residences, one in New York City and one in Philadelphia, the latter for convenience as he had a number of pupils there. It was in New York City that he maintained his studio at 100 Carnegie Hall, and renewed his acquaintance with the Miller family.

In 1918, after America entered World War I, Aurelio enlisted at Fort Hamilton, N.Y., exiting as a private in the U.S. Army. This military service lasted just 6 months but would later hasten his eligibility for U.S. citizenship. In 1919 he joined the Elshuco Trio and began concertizing in New York City and would perform with them over the next 15 years. Aurelio was an active member of The Bohemians, a New York Musicians Club that began in 1907 and continues to this day.

Aurelio returned to Italy to visit his parents in the summer of 1919, and it was that autumn that he began making some 24 known piano rolls for the Duo-Art reproducing piano.

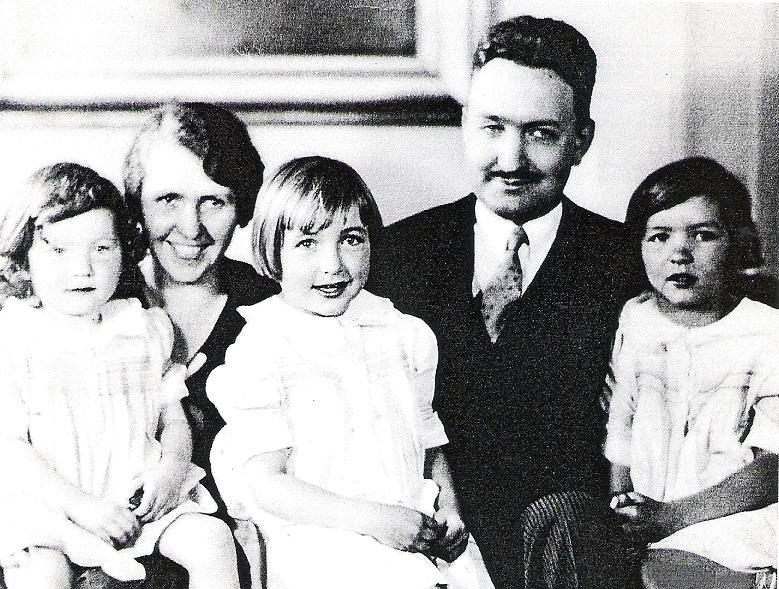
The Giorni Family in 1929

In May 1920, Aurelio and Helen became engaged, and they were married on 1 January 1921. They had three daughters: Helen Linda, born in 1921; Yolanda Elisa, born in 1924; and Aurelia Maria, born in 1927.

=== Death ===
Friday 23 September 1938 was the last day of the Berkshire Festival of Chamber Music, and the last time Aurelio was seen alive. It had been raining heavily due to the record hurricane of 1938. That Friday evening the family called the police to report him missing. The next day the police called to say they'd had a report that a young girl had seen a man answering his description jump off the Pomeroy Avenue bridge into the raging river, and a pocketbook of his was found on the bridge. A thorough search was conducted, including combing the river for several days, without success. It was not until Helen talked to "Aunt Hattie" (Mrs. Charles Harrington), an elderly clairvoyant she would visit who'd been friends with her parents. It was Aunt Hattie who "saw" Aurelio's suicide, by water, and it was she who described to Helen the location of Aurelio's body after several days in the river—a place she had never visited. When Helen relayed the information given her to the Pittsfield police, they were able to find his body on 30 September in the Housatonic River, 1000 feet south of the Pomeroy Avenue bridge.

Aurelio may have been very discouraged and depressed. He was notified just 10 days before his death that his services at Smith College would not be required for the coming term, and was also disappointed when none of his compositions was given place on the South Mountain program, nor was he among the festival performers. Several months prior, on 25 April, Aurelio and his family went to Carnegie Hall for the first performance of his Symphony in D minor, being given that night by the National Orchestral Association under the leadership of conductor Léon Barzin. Aurelio and Helen waited up past midnight for the New York reviews. When Aurelio read them, he was very dejected. The critic had indicated he never wanted to hear the symphony again. Aurelio had no desire to compose afterwards.

Aurelio Giorni was laid to rest in the family plot at Rosedale Cemetery, Orange, New Jersey, on 3 October 1938. The service at All Angels' Church was conducted by the rector George Trowbridge and the emeritus rector Reverend Townsend, who knew Aurelio as a boy in Italy. Aurelio's quartet was played by the Smith College quartet and several of his works were played on the organ by another friend, Seth Bingham. There was no singing but Laurens Seelye (childhood friend of Helen) read several poems which Aurelio set to music.

A Memorial Concert organized by Musicraft Records was later held at New York Town Hall on 26 December 1938. The musicians were Max Hollaender (violin), Sterling Hunkins (cello), and Eugene Kusmiak (piano), performing the Trio in C major, a mastery of harmonic and contrapuntal technique characteristic of the composer's mature work.

== Elshuco Trio ==
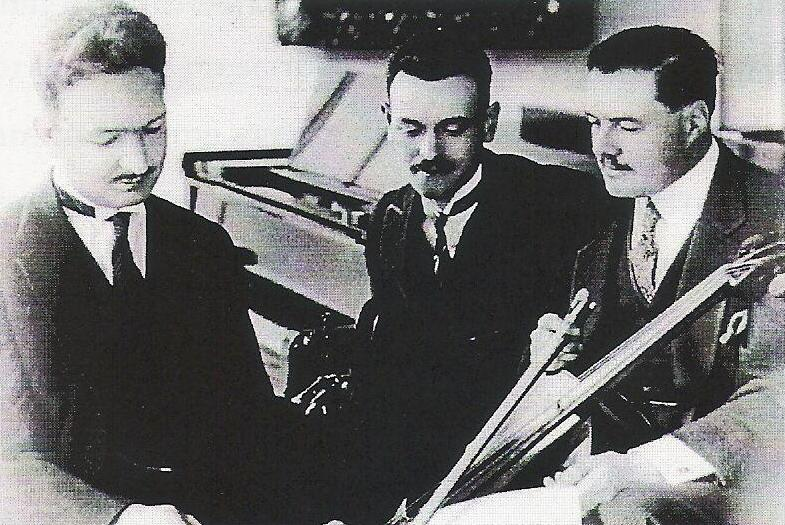
The Elshuco Trio in 1929

The Elshuco Trio was formed in 1918 with founding members Samuel Gardner (violin), Willem Willeke (cello), and Richard Epstein (piano). Willem Willeke was the leader and remained the only cellist throughout the group. The unusual first name was derived from the first syllables of the name of their patroness, Elizabeth Shurtleff Coolidge (1864-1953), who established the Berkshire String Quartet in 1916 and started the Berkshire Chamber Music Festival at South Mountain, Pittsfield, Massachusetts, in 1918. The group had its first public performance at Aeolian Hall in midtown Manhattan in New York City on October 31, 1918.

Aurelio joined the group in the summer of 1919 after Richard Epstein's death. Late in 1919, Reber Johnson also played with the group briefly. By 1920, Elias Breeskin had replaced Samual Gardner on violin. Elias Breeskin left in 1921 and was replaced by William Kroll the following year, who stayed with the group until 1929, when he was replaced by Karl Kraeuter.

The Trio sometimes played for the annual Berkshire Festival of Chamber Music in South Mountain, Pittsfield, Massachusetts. Other known appearances reported where:

The last performance of the Elshuco Trio was their final concert of their 15th season on 7 March 1933, in the United Engineering Societies auditorium (New York), and was augmented for the occasion by Conrad Held, violinist. The works played were the two Brahms piano quartets, in A major, Op. 26, and G minor, Op. 25.

== Piano Recordings (Duo-Art) ==
The following list shows the known recordings Aurelio Giorni made for Duo-Art beginning around 1919. Some of these piano rolls are in the archives of the University of Maryland Music Library.

Title	Composer	Catalog No.
Meditation, Op 72, No 5:	Tchaikovsky	5873
Etude, Op 1, No 1	Schlozer	5886
*Frühlingsglaube (Faith in Spring)	Schubert-Liszt	5900
*Toccata, Op 18, No 4	Sgambati	5911
Murmuring Zephyrs, Op 21, No 4	Jensen	5933
Nocturne, Op 32, No 2	Chopin	5938
Songs without Words, Op 53, No 1, Ab (On the Seashore)	Mendelssohn	5951/D369
*Pastorale	Giorni**	6026
Hark! Hark! The Lark	Schubert-Liszt	6052
*Moment Musical, Op 94, No 2	Schubert	6066
*Petite Valse, Op 28, No 1	Henselt	6090
Prelude in G Minor, Op 23, No 5	Rachmaninoff	6125
*Nutcracker, Op 71: Dance of the Reed Flutes	Tchaikovsky-Esipoff	6132
*The Trout, Op 33	Schubert-Heller	6176
Impromptu, Op 90, No 3, Gb	Schubert	6189
*L'Arlesienne - Suite No 1, No 2: Minuetto	Bizet	6237
Etude, Op 10, No 8, F	Chopin	6323
Etude, Op 5, No 2 (Pensez un peu à moi)	Henselt	6353
*Staccato-Etude, Op 23, No 2, C	A. Rubinstein	6626
Impromptu, Op 31, No 4, g#	Sinding	7021
*Faschingsschwank aus Wien, Op 26, No 4: Intermezzo	Schumann	7022
*Prelude, Op 35, No 1, e	Mendelssohn	7028
Fantasy Pieces, Op 3, No 5, b-b: Sérénade	Rachmaninoff	7031
Songs without Words, Op 53, No 19	Sinding	7033

° Selections listed in the University of Maryland catalog.

°° The only other known commercial recording of a Giorni composition (Musicraft Album No. 33, published June 1939). This charmingly naive little Pastorale was written in 1908, when Aurelio (then 13 years old) had studied harmony, counterpoint and composition for 4 years.

== Elshuco Trio Recordings (Brunswick label) ==
The following list, provided by the Library of Congress Music Division in 1985, represents all the recordings made by the Elshuco Trio which are known to be extant at the time, in 5 large American libraries. There are three known early recordings which are not on this list - "Narcissus" and "Rosary" by Nevin and one of the Hungarian Dances by Brahms. Stanford University (CST) also has annotated copies of pages from the Brunswick catalogs of 1923 and 1925, where it is noted that these selections were chosen for popular appeal rather than a representative sampling of their repertoire.

Title	Composer	Issue #	Library*
Extase	Ganne	10141-A	NSY
Spanish Dance	Moszkowski	10141-B	NSY
Salut d'amour	Elgar	10142-A	DLC, NN, NSY
Serenade	Widor	10142-B	DLC, NN, NSY
Autumn and Winter	Glazunov	10144-A	CST, DLC
Swedish Folk Song	Svendsen	10144-B	CST, DLC
Far-niente	C. Cui	10146-A	DLC
Serenade, Op 3	Victor Herbert	10146-B	DLC
Melody in D	Fauré	10148-A	NN, NSY
Scherzo	Reissiger	10148-B	NN, NSY
Andante, Op 9	Saint-Saëns	10149-A	DLC, NSY
Scherzo	Schubert	10149-B	DLC, NSY
Elegia	Arensa	10159-A	CST
Scherzo	Brahms	10159-B	CST
Songs My Mother Taught Me	Dvořák	10175-A	DLC, NN
A Perfect Day	Jacobs-Bond	10175-B	DLC, NN
Salut d'amour	Elgar	13008-A**	CST, CTY
Serenade	Widor	13008-B**	CST, CTY
Autumn and Winter	Glazunov	13032-A**	DLC
Swedish Folk Song	Svendsen	13032-B**	DLC
Extase	Ganne	13056-A**	NSY
Spanish Dance	Moszkowski	13056-B**	CST, NN
Far-niente	C. Cui	13092-A**	CST, DLC
Serenade, Op 3	Victor Herbert	13092-B**	CST, DLC

° CST - Stanford University; CTY - Yale University; DLC - Library of Congress; NN - New York Public Library; NSY - Syracuse University

°° Re-issued

== Compositions ==
NOTE: Early in 1969, Helen Giorni donated to (1) Exchange & Gift (Music) Division, Library of Congress, and (2) New York Public Library for the Performing Arts, Music Division, all of Aurelio's music in her files, whether published or not. This was all cataloged and two lists were prepared, one for each library.

The New York Public Library for the Performing Arts (NYPLPA) has numerous scores from the Giorni estate cataloged under call number JPB 83-61.

Composition	Year	Publisher / Source / Comments
Pastorale	1908	Duo-Art catalog, piano roll #60278
Sonata for violin & piano	1911	"Some Press Notices", The Roman World, March 4, 1911
Three songs: Du bist wie eine Blume, Gretel, Die Loreley	1911	Hotel Excelsior program, March 23, 1911
Opus 1, Theme and Variation in the Old Style	1913	Review in The Times of London, May 6, 1913
Canons (4 or 5)	1920	Personal letters #2 and #3, June 1920; NYPLPA
Wedding March (dedicated "To Helen")	1920	Family knowledge, manuscript retained. Reported in wedding article, So. Orange, NJ newspaper, Jan 2, 1921.
Sonata in D minor for violoncello and piano (with alternate part for viola)	1925	G. Schirmer Inc., New York ©1925; Theodore Presser Company (PR.114403190)
Symphonic poem Orlando Furioso, for piano - 4 hands	1926	NYPLPA
Awakening, two songs for [high or medium] voice and piano	1927	G. Schirmer Inc., New York ©1927; (words by Edmund W. Putnam)
24 Concert Études in all the major and minor keys, for piano	1927	G. Schirmer Inc., New York ©1927
Minuet and allegro in early romantic style, for orchestra	1928	Composed for the Schubert Centenary in 1928 and arranged for the New York Chamber Music Society
2-Piano Phantasy	1929	Personal letter #39
Sonata in E♭ major, for piano and flute	1932	George Barrère, flute; Prem. Dec. 17, 1933, NYFC, Steinway Hall, New York
Sonata in A major, for clarinet and piano	1933	J. Green Music, Hollywood, CA; NYPLPA; UMD Library - Score Collection Inventory: G
Trio in C major, for violin, cello and piano	1934	Musicraft Records, Inc., New York (audio recording, four 78 rpm disks)
"Margaritae Sorori", based on poem by William Ernest Henley	1936	Family knowledge
Trio, for flute, cello and piano	1936	News release, NY College of Music, March 12, 1936
Quintet, for flute, violin, viola, cello and piano	1936	News release, NY College of Music, March 12, 1936
Symphony in D minor	1936	Performance by the National Orchestral Association - Léon Barzin, Conductor - April 25, 1938
Cradle Song, for medium voice and piano		G. Schirmer Inc., New York ©1941; (words by Florence K. Mixter)

=== Other works ===
The following compositions are known to exist as part of the NYPLPA collection or others, but for which the year they were written is uncertain. Most of these were likely unpublished.

- Aria for piano, in F major
- Concerto in D major, for piano and orchestra
- Double fugue for piano, 4 hands
- Fantasie-sonata in A minor
- Intermezzo in C minor, for flute, violoncello and harp (or piano)
- Merry fugue in E♭, for piano
- Six modal quatrains, for female 4-part chorus
- The Music Makers, for chorus (SATB), unaccompanied
- The Phantom Leaves, song for mixed 4-part chorus a cappella or with string quartet accompaniment
- Rhapsody Divertissement, for piano, oboe, clarinet, horn and bassoon
- Sonata in E minor, for piano and violin
- Sonata in D minor, for piano and violoncello (or viola)
- The Dreamer, song for 4 part male chorus (or quartet) with 2 piano accompaniment
- Trio in B♭, for piano, violin and violoncello
- Variations Concertantes on The British Grenadiers, for flute, violin, viola, violoncello and harp (or piano)
- Zodiac Town - 12 children's carols, for 4 mixed voices (a cappella, or with piano accompaniment); words by Nancy Byrd Turner

Additionally, the NYPLPA collection lists over two dozen "songs with piano accompaniment" not listed here, many that contains words credited to several individuals.
