= Marguerite Volavy =

Pianist

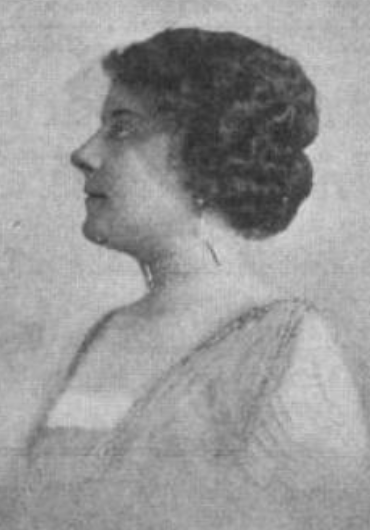
- Marguerite Volavy, from a 1922 publication
- Born: 28 December 1886; Brno, Moravia
- Died: July 30, 1951 (aged 64); Valhalla, New York, U.S.
- Other names: Felix Gerdts; George Kerr
- Occupation: Pianist

Marguerite Volavy, also known as Madame Volavy (28 December 1886 – 30 July 1951), was a pianist particularly notable for her work in recording piano rolls.

== Early life ==
Volavy was born in Brno, Moravia, and studied at the Vienna Conservatory under Anton Door. She graduated first in her class in piano at the age of 15. In 1902 she began playing with the Prague Orchestra, and then in 1912 she moved to the United States where she played her first concert at Carnegie Hall in 1915. She performed in New York City, multiple times.

In addition to her live performances, Volavy recorded piano rolls and talked with newspaper reporters about how the piano rolls were made and edited. She recorded piano works under the name Volavy and two pseudonyms (Felix Gerdts and George Kerr). Her piano rolls were recorded by the American Piano Company also known as Ampico. Volavy recorded 246 piano rolls for the American Piano Company (under the Ampico and Rythmodik labels), twenty for Welte, eight for Duo-Art, and many more for other labels. She also recorded a duet with Howard Brockway. Her earliest known recording was Schumann's Novellette Op. 21. no. 1, recorded in 1912; her last was Liszt's First Piano Concerto, recorded in 1930 or 1931.

In May 1924, Volavy's hand was damaged in an accident on the subway in New York City. She received financial compensation for the injury and she was unable to continue playing the piano in public. In 1926 she began working as a music editor with the American Piano Company, where she was responsible for making sure recordings produced the musician's music correctly. She also lectured about music, and started teaching in 1932, Some said she was known as Madame Volavy because she resembled a madam as might be found in a brothel, while other publications noted "her proportions" were such that the name seemed appropriate.

Volavy died in Valhalla, New York in 1951.
