= Ossip Gabrilowitsch =

Russian-American pianist and conductor (1878–1936)

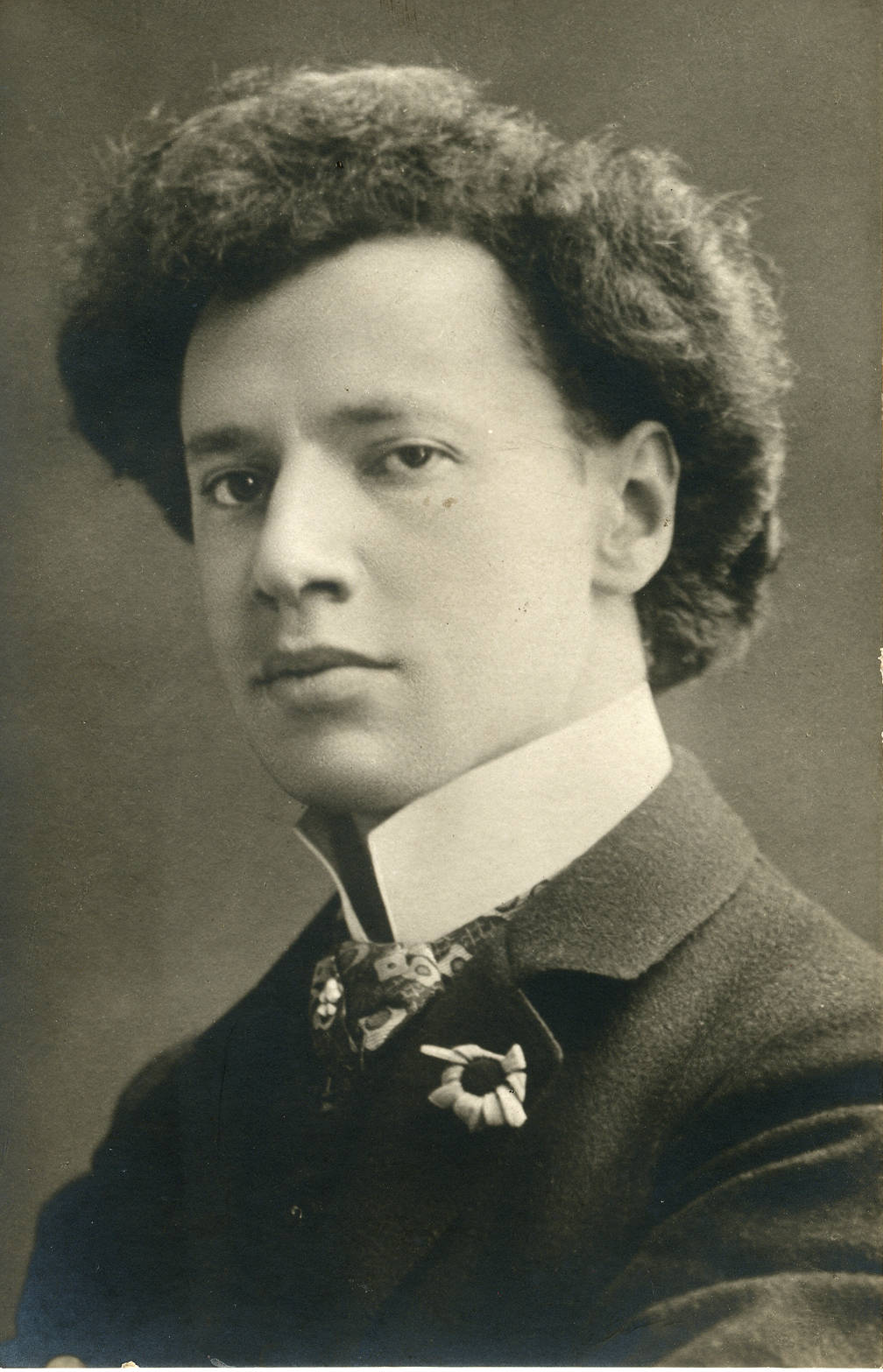
- Born: 7 February [O.S. 26 January] 1878; Saint Petersburg, Russia
- Died: 14 September 1936 (aged 58); Detroit, Michigan, US
- Occupations: Pianist, conductor and composer
- Spouse: Clara Clemens (m. 1909)

Signature
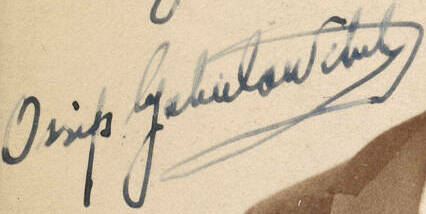

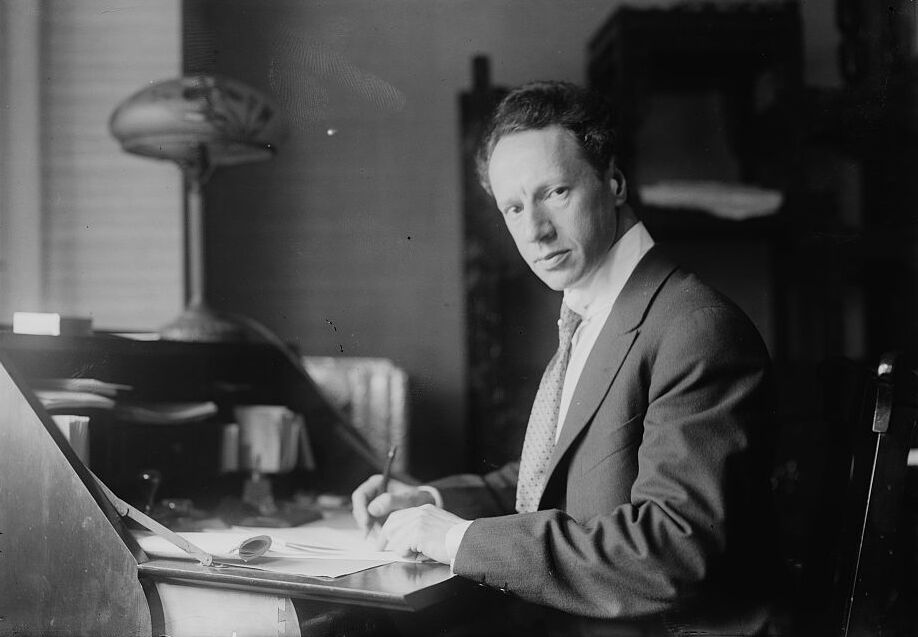
Ossip Gabrilowitsch in 1915

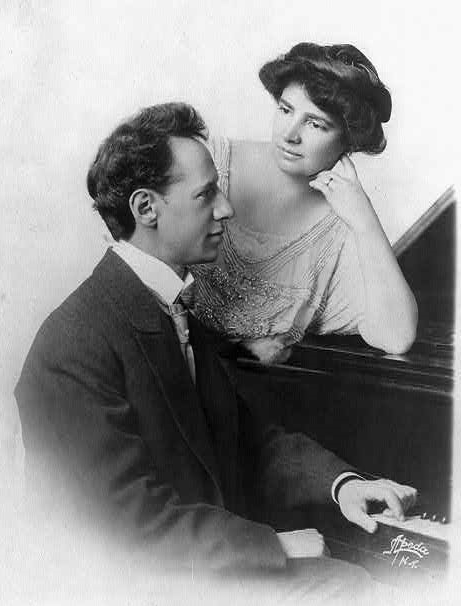
Ossip Gabrilowitsch with his wife Clara Clemens

Ossip Salomonovich Gabrilowitsch (also Gabrilowitsch; Russian: Осип Сoломонович Габрилович, romanized: Osip Solomonovich Gabrilovich; 7 February [O.S. 26 January] 1878 – 14 September 1936) was a Russian-American pianist, conductor and composer.

== Biography ==
Ossip Gabrilowitsch was born into a Jewish family in Saint Petersburg. His parents were Salomon Gabrilowitsch and Rose Segall.

He studied the piano and composition at the Saint Petersburg Conservatory, with Anton Rubinstein, Anatoly Lyadov and Alexander Glazunov among others. After graduating in 1894, he spent two years studying piano with Theodor Leschetizky in Vienna.

In July 1905 he recorded ten pieces for the Welte-Mignon reproducing piano, one of the first pianists to do so. Between 1915 and 1927, he subsequently recorded at least fifteen more reproducing rolls for Duo-Art and at least five reproducing rolls for Ampico.

On 6 October 1909, he married Mark Twain's daughter Clara Clemens, a singer who appeared with him in recital. On 18 August 1910, their only child, Nina, was born at Mark Twain's home Stormfield in Redding, Connecticut. Nina, the last known lineal descendant of Mark Twain, died on 16 January 1966 in a Los Angeles hotel. She had been a heavy drinker, and bottles of pills and alcohol were found in her room. Her death was ruled a suicide.

From 1910 to 1914, he was conductor of the Munich Konzertverein (later known as the Munich Philharmonic). At the outbreak of World War I, he was arrested as an enemy national. Through the intervention of the nuncio to Bavaria, Archbishop Eugenio Pacelli (later Pope Pius XII), Gabrilowitsch was freed from jail, and then he headed to the United States via Zürich in August 1914.

He settled in the US, and was offered the post of conductor of the Boston Symphony Orchestra. In declining, he recommended that the Boston board appoint the recently arrived Sergei Rachmaninoff. In 1918 he was appointed the founding director of the Detroit Symphony Orchestra, while still maintaining his life as a concert pianist. Before accepting the conductor's position, he demanded a new auditorium be built, and this was the impetus for the building of Orchestra Hall.

Gabrilowitsch composed a few works, primarily short piano pieces for his own use. He was a National Patron of Delta Omicron, an international professional music fraternity.

He died from stomach cancer on 14 September 1936, in Detroit, Michigan. He is buried in the Langdon plot of the Woodlawn Cemetery in Elmira, New York.

== Works ==
- 5 Klavierstücke, Op. 1
  - No. 3 Valse lente (c. 1897)
- Gavotte in D minor, Op. 2
- Compositions for the piano, Op. 3
  - No. 1 Caprice Burlesque (ca 1901)
  - No. 2 Mazurka Mélancolique
- Thème varié pour piano, Op. 4
- Mélodie, Op. 8, No.1
- La Czarina, Mazurka Russe (The Tsarina, Russian Mazurka)
- Three Songs, Op. 11:
  - No. 1 Good-bye (Christina Rossetti)
  - No. 2 I love her gentle forehead (Richard Watson Gilder)
  - No. 3 The new day (R. W. Gilder, c. 1917)
- Two Piano Pieces, Op. 12
  - No. 1 Elegy
  - No. 2 Etude for the left hand
- Near to thee ... [Song] Poem by Johann Wolfgang von Goethe, English version by Clara Clemens (ca. 1924)

== Literature ==
- Clara Clemens: My husband Gabrilowitsch. Reprint of the ed. published by Harper, New York. New York, NY: Da Capo Press, 1979. ISBN 0-306-79563-9
- Cooke, James Francis: Great Pianists on Piano Playing: Godowsky, Hofmann, Lhévinne, Paderewski and 24 Other Legendary Performers. New York (Dover) 1999. (Reprint of the original edition 1917).
- Ossip Gabrilowitsch: Essentials of Touch. In James Francis Cook: Great pianists on piano playing: study talks with foremost virtuosos. Publisher: Theo. Presser & Co., Philadelphia 1917, page 122

== Media ==
- Ossip Gabrilowitsch plays for Welte-Mignon on 4 July 1905 Johannes Brahms Intermezzo in C major, Op. 119, No. 3
- Ossip Gabrilowitsch plays Rigaudon, Op. 204, No. 3 by Raff (Welte-Mignon recording # D296) on a 1921 Baldwin C, 6'2" Welte-Mignon Reproducing Piano.
