= Marguerite Melville Liszniewska =

American pianist

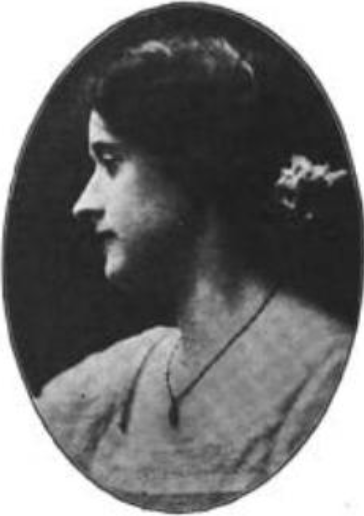
- Margueriet Melville Liszniewska, from a 1915 publication
- Born: Marguerite Melville; April 17, 1879; Brooklyn, New York
- Died: March 7, 1935; Cincinnati, Ohio
- Occupation(s): Pianist, composer
- Years active: 1890s to 1935

Marguerite Melville Liszniewska (April 17, 1879 – March 7, 1935) was an American pianist, teacher, and composer.

== Early life and education ==
Melville was born in Brooklyn, New York, the daughter of Charles W. Melville and Mary Theresa Hughes Melville. Her parents were both musical; her father, an organist, was born in Scotland, and her mother, a singer, was born in Canada. Her parents were also both opera singers, and her father was also a well known theatrical composer who later in life was an "advance man" for other well known opera performers. Her paternal grandfather Francis Melville was a pianoforte maker in Glasgow, Scotland. Her brother Frederick (b. 1864 d. 1944) was also an accomplished musician and multi instrumentalist who could play "any instrument he could pick up." Frederick built his own violin, and family lore has it that he used to play organ concerts at St Patrick's Cathedral for a dollar admission. She went to study piano and composition in Berlin at age 15, with Ernst Jedliczka and O. B. Boise, and later in Vienna with Theodor Leschetizky. "It is such a beautiful thing to study music," she said in an interview, "Artistic things get so easily crowded to the wall or pushed completely out of our lives. Even the least inclination to learn much should be encouraged in all ages."

== Career ==
=== Musician ===
Melville gave her public debut in 1897, in Berlin, and made her London debut in 1910. She played several times at Queen's Hall under conductor Sir Henry Wood. In 1913 she gave a charity concert in Vienna, sharing the program with Pablo Casals. She gave a benefit show to raise money for the Red Cross in 1914, in New York. IFrom 1915 to 1917, she toured in the United States. "She is an artist who critics everywhere have praised for individuality, scholarship, amazing technical proficiency and finished artistry," said The Musical Leader in 1923.

Melville Liszniewska played at the White House for President Calvin Coolidge in 1926. She recorded two pieces for Ampico piano rolls.

=== Composer and teacher ===
Melville wrote "her most significant surviving composition", Piano Quintet in E minor, Op. 8, in Berlin about 1900 or 1901, when she was in her early twenties. Other compositions for violin and piano included Romanza in F, Sonata in G minor, She and her husband taught at the Cincinnati Conservatory of Music in the 1920s, and she taught master classes in several American cities in her later years.

== Personal life ==
In 1908, Marguerite Melville married Polish pianist and lawyer Karol Liszniewski, in Vienna. They had two children, Jan (John) and Elizabeth Josselyn. She died in 1935 at the age of 55, in Cincinnati. Her widower and colleagues established a scholarship fund at the Cincinnati Conservatory in her memory.
