= Piano roll =

Music storage medium used to operate a player piano, piano player or reproducing piano

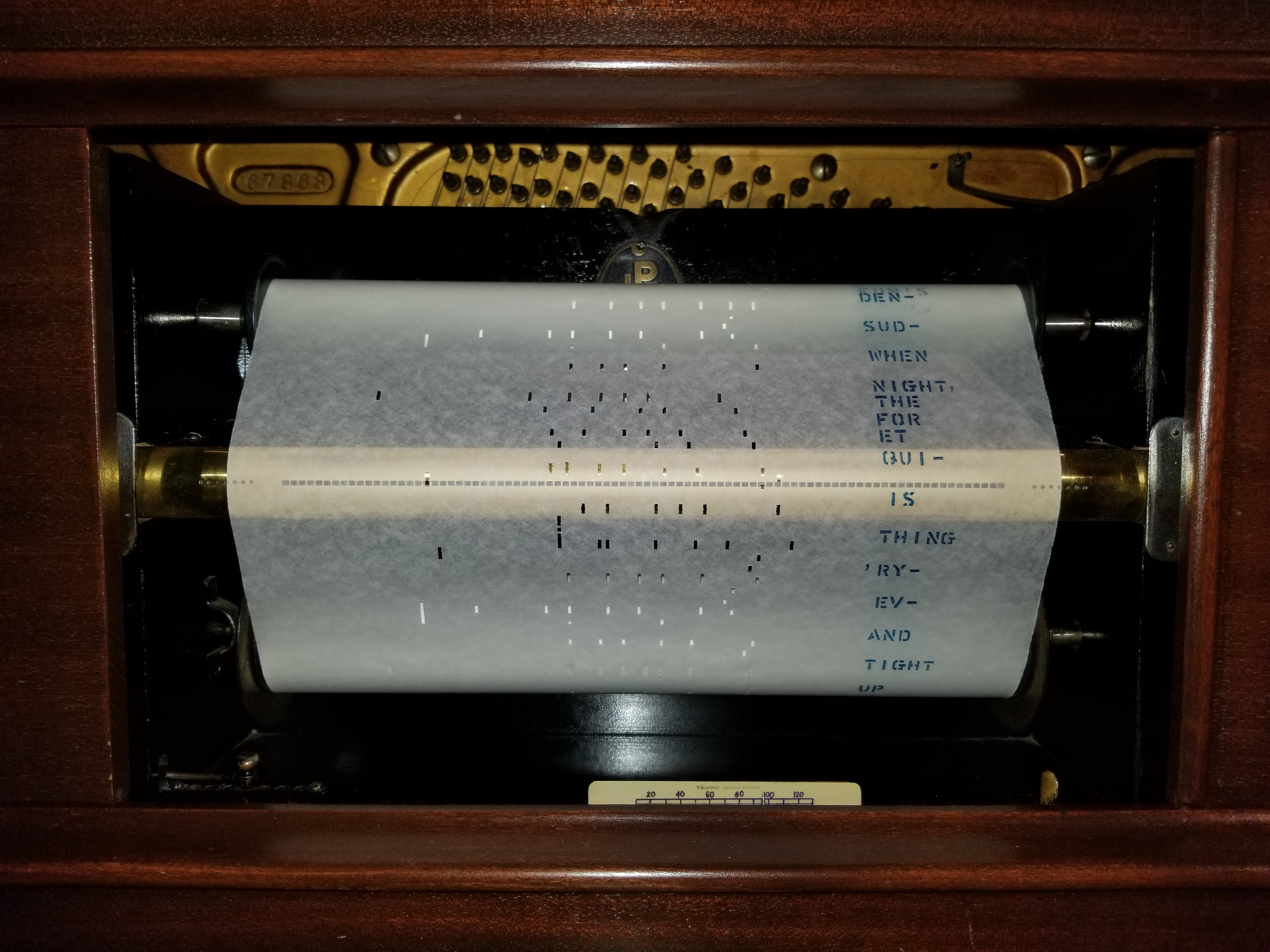
A player piano roll being played

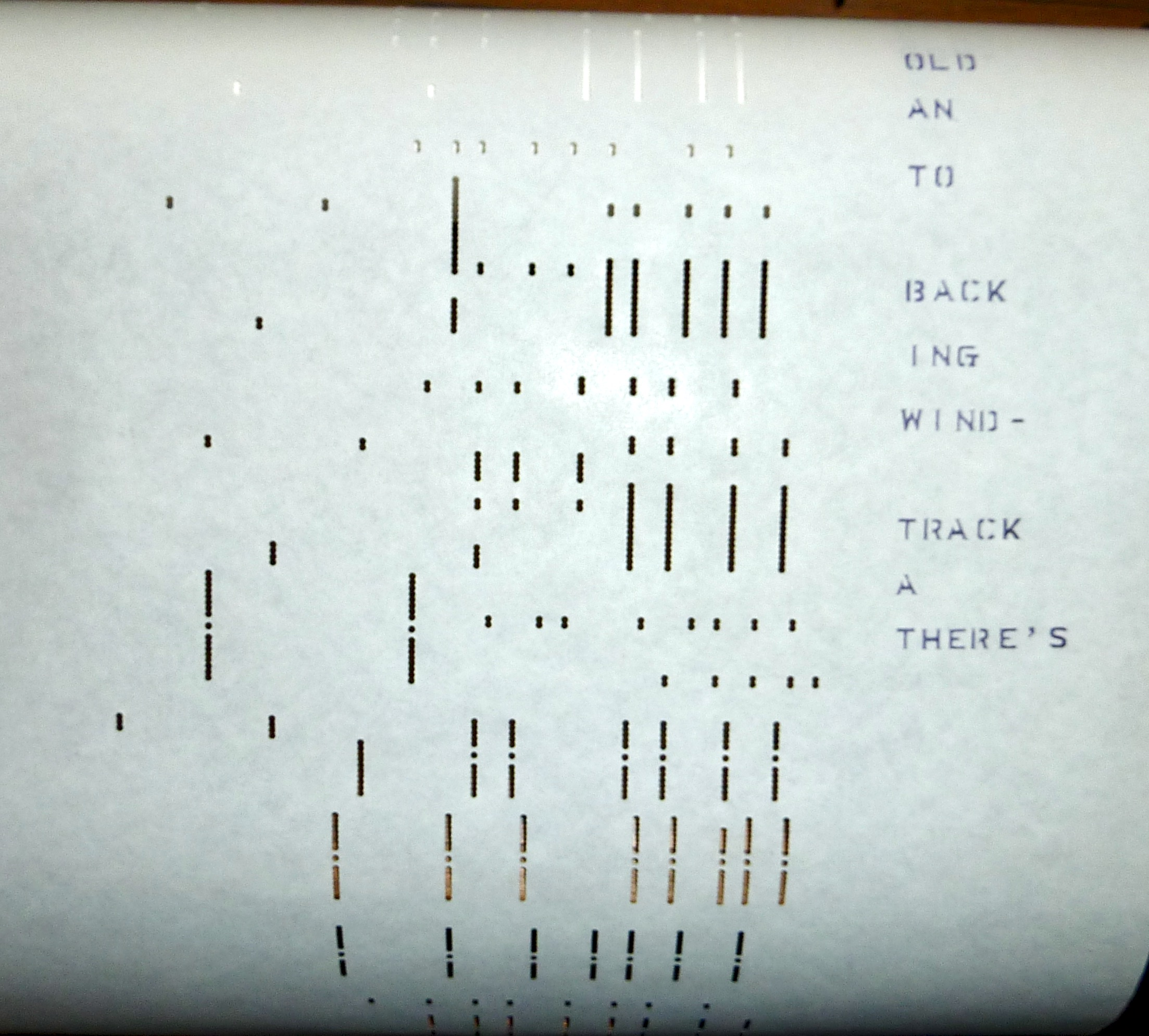
Mastertouch Australian Dance Gems piano roll with lyrics printed to side

A piano roll is a music storage medium used to operate a player piano, piano player or reproducing piano. Piano rolls, like other music rolls, are continuous rolls of paper with holes punched into them. These perforations represent note control data. The roll moves over a reading system known as a tracker bar; the playing cycle for each musical note is triggered when a perforation crosses the bar.

Piano rolls have been in continuous production since at least 1896, and are still being manufactured today; QRS Music offers 45,000 titles with "new titles being added on a regular basis", although they are no longer mass-produced. MIDI files have generally supplanted piano rolls in storing and playing back performance data, accomplishing digitally and electronically what piano rolls do mechanically. MIDI editing software often features the ability to represent the music graphically as a piano roll, often with aids like a grid representing bars, beats, and other divisions, as well as shaded backgrounds representing the black and white keys of a piano.

The first paper rolls were used commercially by Welte & Sons in their orchestrions beginning in 1883.

A rollography is a listing of piano rolls, especially made by a single performer, analogous to a discography.

The Musical Museum in Brentford, London, England houses one of the world's largest collections of piano rolls, with over 20,000 rolls as well as an extensive collection of instruments which may be seen and heard.

== Buffalo Convention ==
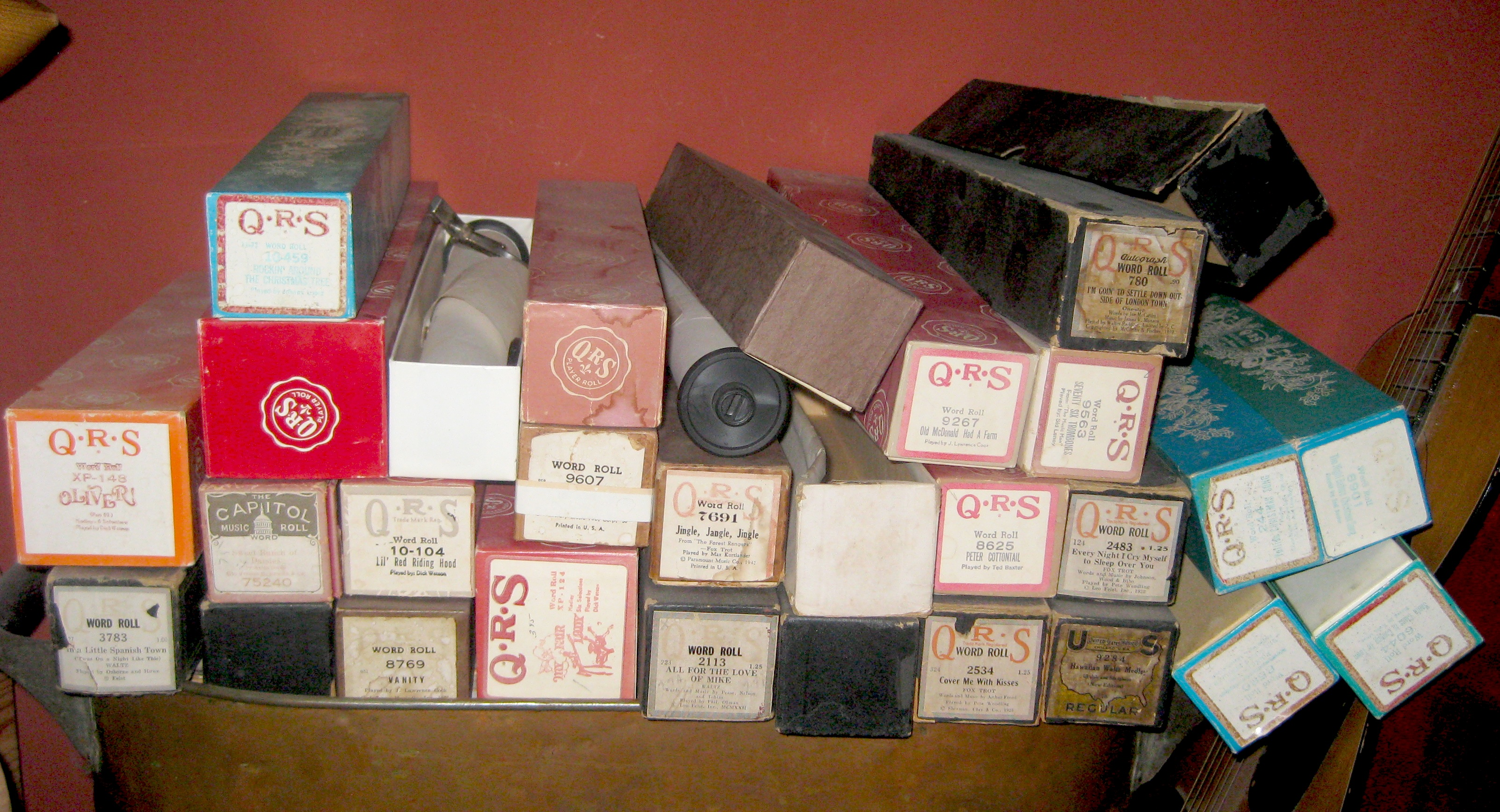
A stack of piano rolls, some in boxes

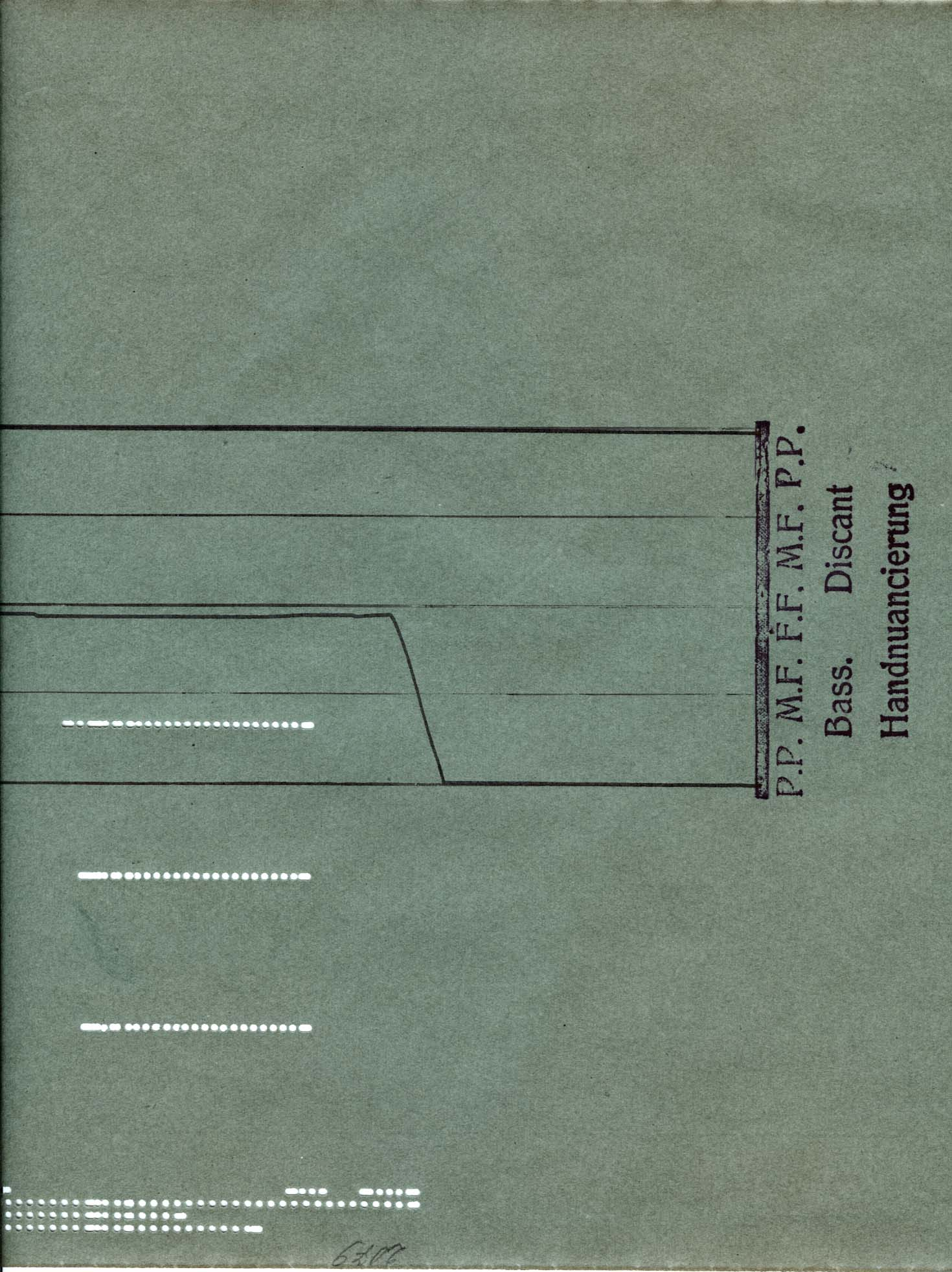
First part of a piano roll for Welte-Mignon, about 1919, with lines for a pianolist, according to the Buffalo Convention

In the early years of player pianos, piano rolls were produced in varying dimensions and formats. Most rolls used one of three musical scales. The 65-note format, with a playing range of A1 to C♯7, was introduced in 1896 in the United States, specifically for piano music. In 1900, an American format playing all 88 notes of the standard piano scale (A0 to C8) was introduced. In 1902, a German 72-note scale (F1, G1 to E7) was introduced.

On December 10, 1908, a group representing most of the largest U.S. manufacturers of player pianos gathered in Buffalo, New York, to try to agree on some standards. The group settled on a width of 11 1/4 inches (286 mm) and perforation standards for 65-note rolls of 6 holes to the inch, and for 88-note rolls of 9 holes to the inch. That left margins at both ends for future developments. Any pianos built to those standards could play rolls made to them, albeit sometimes with a loss of special functionality. The formats became a loose world standard.

== Metronomic, hand played, and reproducing rolls ==
Example audio of a piano roll
Piano roll from 1920 of Zez Confrey playing "Afghanistan"

Metronomic or arranged rolls are rolls produced by positioning the music slots without real-time input from a performing musician. The music, when played back, is typically purely metronomical. Metronomically arranged music rolls are deliberately left metronomic so as to enable a player-pianist to create their own musical performance (such as varying the dynamics, tempo, and phrasing) via the hand controls that are a feature of all player pianos.

Hand played rolls are created by capturing in real time the hand-played performance of one or more pianists upon a piano connected to a recording machine. The production roll reproduced the real-time performance of the original recording when played back at a constant speed. (It became industry convention for recordings of music intended to be used for dancing to be regularized into strict tempo despite the original performance having the slight tempo fluctuations of all human performances, as due to the recording and production process, any fluctuations would be magnified/exaggerated in the finished production copy and result in an uneven rhythm.)

Reproducing rolls are the same as hand-played rolls but have additional control codes to operate the dynamic modifying systems specific to whichever brand of reproducing piano it is designed to be played back on, producing an approximation of the original recording pianist's dynamics. Reproducing pianos were beyond the reach of the average home in the original era of popularity of these instruments and were heavily marketed as reproducing the 'soul' of the performer – slogans such as "The Master's Fingers On Your Piano" or "Paderewski will play for you in your own house!" were common.

== Compositions for pianola and reproducing piano ==
The player piano gives the opportunity to create music that is impossible for humans to play, or, more correctly, music that was not conceived in terms of performance by hand. Over one hundred composers wrote music specially for the player piano during the course of the 20th century. Many mainstream composers experimented with its possibilities, including Igor Stravinsky, Alfredo Casella, and Paul Hindemith; others, including Conlon Nancarrow, made it their primary milieu.

The Duo-Art, Ampico, and Welte-Mignon brands were known as "reproducing" piano rolls, as they could accurately reproduce the touch and dynamics of the artist as well as the notes struck, when played back on capable pianos.

== Reproducing pianos ==
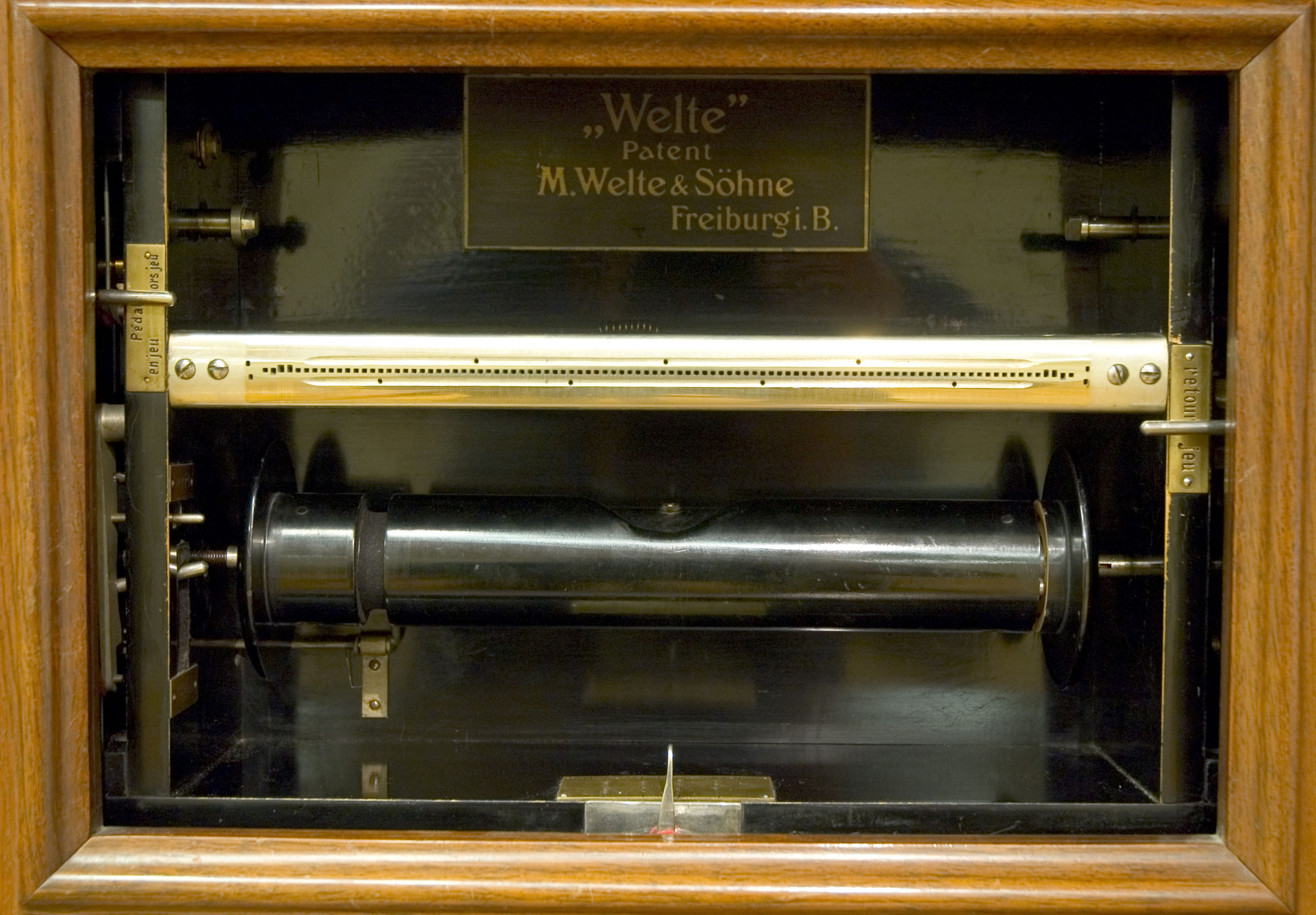
Tracker bar of a Welte-Mignon

Rolls for the reproducing piano were generally made from the recorded performances of famous musicians. Typically, a pianist would sit at a specially designed recording piano, and the pitch and duration of any notes played would be either marked or perforated on a blank roll, together with the duration of the sustaining and soft pedal.

Reproducing pianos can also re-create the dynamics of a pianist's performance by means of specially encoded control perforations placed towards the edges of a music roll. Different companies had different ways of notating dynamics, some technically advanced, some secret, and some dependent entirely on a recording producer's handwritten notes, but in all cases these dynamic hieroglyphics had to be skillfully converted into the specialized perforated codes needed by the different types of instrument.

Recorded rolls play at a specific, marked speed, where for example, 70 signifies 7 feet (2.1 m) of paper travel in one minute, at the start of the roll. On all pneumatic player pianos, the paper is pulled on to a take-up spool, and as more paper winds on, so the effective diameter of the spool increases, and with it the paper speed. Player piano engineers were well aware of this, as can be seen from many patents of the time, but since reproducing piano recordings were generally made with a similar take-up spool drive, the tempo of the recorded performance is faithfully reproduced, despite the gradually increasing paper speed.

The playing of many pianists and composers is preserved on reproducing piano roll. Gustav Mahler, Camille Saint-Saëns, Edvard Grieg, Teresa Carreño, Claude Debussy, Liberace, Manuel de Falla, Scott Joplin, Sergei Rachmaninoff, Sergei Prokofiev, Alexander Scriabin, Jelly Roll Morton and George Gershwin are amongst the composers and pianists who have had their performances recorded in this way.

Duo-Art featured artists such as Ignace Jan Paderewski, George Gershwin, Maurice Ravel, Teresa Carreño, Percy Grainger, Leopold Godowsky and Ferruccio Busoni. The Ampico brand's featured artists included Sergei Rachmaninoff, Ferde Grofé, Leo Ornstein, Mischa Levitzki, Winifred MacBride, and Marguerite Volavy. Welte-Mignon, the earliest reproducing system, recorded artists such as Gustav Mahler, Camille Saint-Saëns, Claude Debussy, Manuel de Falla, Alexander Scriabin, Enrique Granados, Eugen d'Albert, Josef Lhévinne, Raoul Pugno, and Carl Reinecke (who was the earliest-born pianist to record in any media format).

There were hundreds of companies worldwide producing rolls during the peak period of their popularity (1900–1927). Some other non-reproducing rolls makers of live performances are listed below together with their most memorable recording artistes.

- Aeolian: Pauline Alpert, Edythe Baker, Felix Arndt, Jules de Sivrai, Constance Mering, Frank Milne, Rube Bloom, Eubie Blake, Les Copeland
- QRS: James P Johnson, Fats Waller, Zez Confrey, Blind Boone, Lem Fowler, J. Lawrence Cook, Pete Wendling, Phil Ohman, Victor Arden, J. Russel Robinson
- Connorized: Scott Joplin
- Republic: Adrian Rollini
- U.S. Music Roll Company: Lee Sims, Robert Billings
- Imperial: Charley Straight, Roy Bargy
- Vocalstyle: Jelly Roll Morton, Walter Davison, Clarence Jones, Luckey Roberts, Cow Cow Davenport, Amanda Randolph
- Capitol/Columbia: Jimmy Blythe, Clarence Johnson, Pearl White, Eddie Hanson

== Legal protectability against copying ==
White-Smith Music Publishing Company v. Apollo Company, 209 U.S. 1 (1908), was a decision by the Supreme Court of the United States which ruled that manufacturers of music rolls for player pianos did not have to pay royalties to the composers. The ruling was based on a holding that the piano rolls were not copies of the plaintiffs' copyrighted sheet music, but were instead parts of the machine that reproduced the music.

This case was subsequently eclipsed by Congress's intervention in the form of an amendment to the Copyright Act of 1909, protecting them and introducing a compulsory license for the manufacture and distribution of such "mechanical" embodiments of musical works.

== In digital audio workstations ==
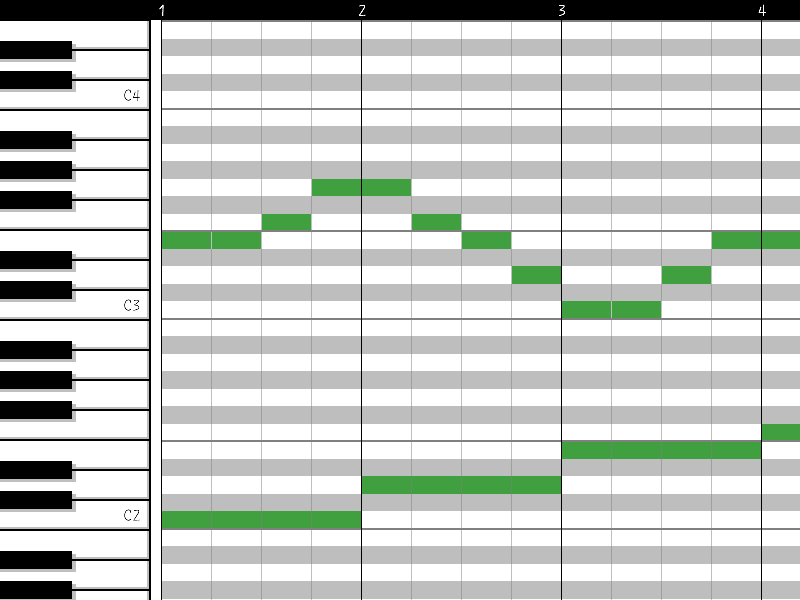
DAW piano roll

In most modern digital audio workstation software, the term "piano roll" is used to refer to a graphical display of, and means of editing, MIDI note data. Piano rolls allow the user to enter the pitch, length and velocity of notes manually, instead of recording the output of a keyboard or other device for entering note data. They may also be used to edit or correct a keyboard performance. Usually a means of manually editing other aspects of the MIDI data, such as pitch bend or modulation, is also present, although not strictly part of the piano roll itself.

From the mid 1980s, music software started to include grid-based graphical editors inspired by piano rolls, with the two axes representing pitch and time, and the notes displayed as bars on the grid. MacroMind's MusicWorks (1984) utilized the Macintosh's high resolution WIMP graphical user interface to implement a piano roll-style editor with a keyboard aligned vertically on the left of a grid. Other early examples of piano roll-inspired editors include Southworth's Total Music (1986), Iconix (1987) by System Exclusive, which used a vertical scrolling piano roll with the keyboard aligned horizontally at the top of the editing window, and Master Tracks Pro (1987) by Passport Designs.

With the release of Cubase and its Key Edit window in 1989, the piano roll format introduced by MusicWorks was established as a standard MIDI editing feature in modern digital audio workstations.

== Research ==
At the Academy of the Arts Bern (HKB), since 2007 there runs a series of Research projects, mostly financed by the Swiss National Fund of Research. In an Agora project of the SNF, HKB was offering short films, texts and sources about the topic.

== See also ==
- Book music
- Music roll is the generic term for similar rolls used to operate fairground organs (or band organs), calliopes, hand-cranked organs, orchestrions and other types of automatically played pipe organ or mechanical organ.
- Scorewriter
- Virtual Studio Technology
- White-Smith Music Publishing Company v. Apollo Company

== Sources ==
- Obenchain, Elaine (1977). The complete catalog of Ampico Reproducing Piano rolls. New York: American Piano Company. ISBN 0-9601172-1-0. (out of print).
- Aeolian Company (1987). Smith, Charles Davis (ed.). Duo-Art piano music: a complete classified catalog of music recorded for the Duo-Art reproducing piano. Monrovia, CA: Player Shop. OCLC 165572039. (out of print).
- Billings, Bob & Ginny (1990). The Billings Rollography, vol. 1: QRS Word Rolls, 99-6000, vol. 2: Recordo and its Kin, vol. 3: Pianists, vol. 4: QRS Word Rolls, #6000-#11000, Q Series, Celebrity Series, XP Series, 1934-1994, vol. 5: QRS History, Pianists & Memorabilia, 1934-1994, vol. 6: Tel-Electric Co. Rock Soup Publishers, Belmont, CA. Library of Congress card #2-899-950. (out of print).
- Smith, Charles David; Howe, Richard James (1994). The Welte-Mignon, its music and musicians; complete catalogue of Welte-Mignon reproducing piano recordings 1905–1932. Vestal, NY: Vestal Press. ISBN 1-879511-17-7. historical overview of companies and individuals, biographical essays on the recording artists and composers. (out of print).
- Dangel, Gerhard; Schmitz, Hans-W. (2006). Welte-Mignon-Reproduktionen: Gesamtkatalog der Aufnahmen für das Welte-Mignon Reproduktions-Piano 1905–1932 [Welte-Mignon Reproductions: Complete Library of Recordings for the Welte-Mignon Reproducing Piano 1905–1932] (in German). Stuttgart: Rombach Druck. ISBN 3-00-017110-X.
- Bryner, Barbara (2002). The piano roll: a valuable recording medium of the twentieth century (Thesis). Department of Music, University of Utah. OCLC 50482085.
- White, William Braid (1914). The player-piano up-to-date: a comprehensive treatise on the principles, construction, adjustment, regulation and use of pneumatic mechanisms for piano-playing: together with a description of the leading mechanisms now in use and some hints on the playing thereof. New York: Edward Lyman Bill. OCLC 6494797.
