= Edelweiss Pianos =

British piano company

- Industry: Musical instruments
- Founded: 1975 (51 years ago) in Cambridge, UK
- Founder: John Roy Norman
- Headquarters: Cambridge, UK
- Area served: Worldwide
- Key people: Chris Norman (Current owner and manager)
- Products: • Grand pianos • Upright pianos
- Services: • Piano manufacturing • Piano restoration
- Website: www.edelweisspianos.com

Edelweiss Pianos is a British piano company, founded in 1975 in Cambridge, UK, as 1066 Pianos by research physicist and pianist John Roy Norman.

== History ==
Edelweiss Pianos was founded as 1066 Pianos by Roy Norman, a research physicist at Cambridge University who originally tuned pianos as a hobby before opening a small piano shop in Cambridge. The company's workshop and headquarters is now located in the village of Fulbourn, just outside Cambridge.

== Models ==
Edelweiss pianos are sold through the company's Cambridge headquarters and through Harrods, and come by default as player pianos.

== See also ==
- Player piano
