= American Piano Company =

American piano manufacturer

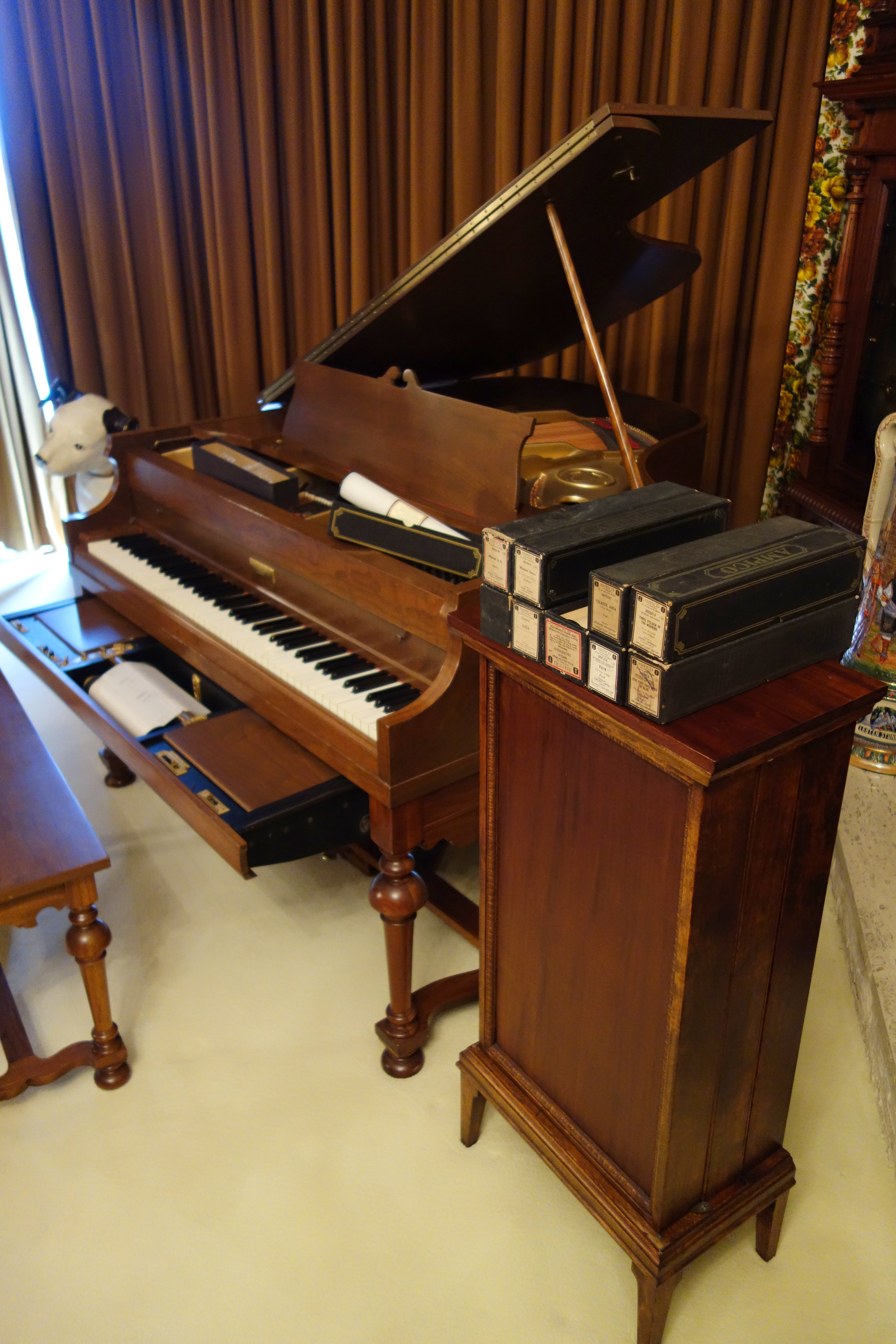
- Ampico reproducing piano in the Bayernhof Music Museum
- Industry: Piano manufacturing
- Founded: 1908; 118 years ago
- Defunct: 1932
- Fate: Merged with Aeolian Company
- Brands: Ampico

American Piano Company (Ampico) was an American piano manufacturer formed in 1908 through the merger of Wm. Knabe & Co., Chickering & Sons, Marshall & Wendell, and Foster-Armstrong. They later purchased the Mason & Hamlin piano company as their flagship piano. The merger created one of the largest American piano manufacturers. In 1932, it was merged with the Aeolian Company to form Aeolian-American Co.

== Reproducing pianos ==
From 1914, The American Piano Company was one of the leading producers of player pianos, most notably their reproducing system known as the Ampico. The Ampico reproducing player piano was able to capture all the expression of the original performance, with dynamics and fine nuances other devices could not reproduce. Their main competitors in reproducing systems were the Aeolian Duo-Art (1913) and Welte-Mignon (1905). The player piano and reproducing Ampico mechanism was originally designed by Charles Fuller Stoddard (1876–1958) with Dr. Clarence Hickman joining the company in the mid-1920s.

Distinguished classical and popular pianists such as Sergei Rachmaninoff (1873–1943), Leo Ornstein (1892–2002), Ferde Grofé (1892-1972), Winifred MacBride, Marguerite Melville Liszniewska, Marguerite Volavy (1886–1951), Adam Carroll, Frank Milne and others recorded for Ampico, and their rolls are a legacy of 19th and early 20th century aesthetic and musical practice.

By the end of 1932, Ampico suffered economic difficulties and was finally merged with the Aeolian Company, manufacturer of player pianos and organs. The combined company, known as Aeolian-American Corp., went through several ownership changes before declaring bankruptcy in 1985.

The Ampico reproducing player piano system was discontinued in 1941. The last model introduced was the Ampico Spinet (Style "G") Reproducing Piano in 1936, which had all the functionality of a reproducing piano, and although having a low cost of $495, had modest sales. Only about 200 had been completed by the start of the war.

The first piano rolls specially coded for the Ampico were made by The Rythmodik Music Corporation.

== History ==
The village of East Rochester, New York, originally named Despatch after the transportation company that spawned several dozen car shops in the area, was also home to a musical manufacturing giant for the better part of the 20th century. Nestled in between the New York Central Railroad tracks and Commercial Street, the 250,000 square-foot edifice designed by Henry Ives was the first industrial building in the United States to be constructed from reinforced concrete.

Renowned for its fine craftsmanship, the American Piano Company was the largest distributor and manufacturer of pianos in the world by the mid-1920s. The instrument's popularity reached its peak that decade thanks to a growth in prosperity and an increased interest in music stimulated by phonographs and radio. Piano producers across the country would not fare as well the following decade. Over 347,000 pianos were purchased in the United States in 1923, .

== Legacy ==
Ampico reproducing pianos, and their associated piano rolls were rediscovered by collectors in the 1960s who formed the Automatic Musical Instruments Collector's Association.
