= Welte-Mignon =

German musical instrument manufacturer

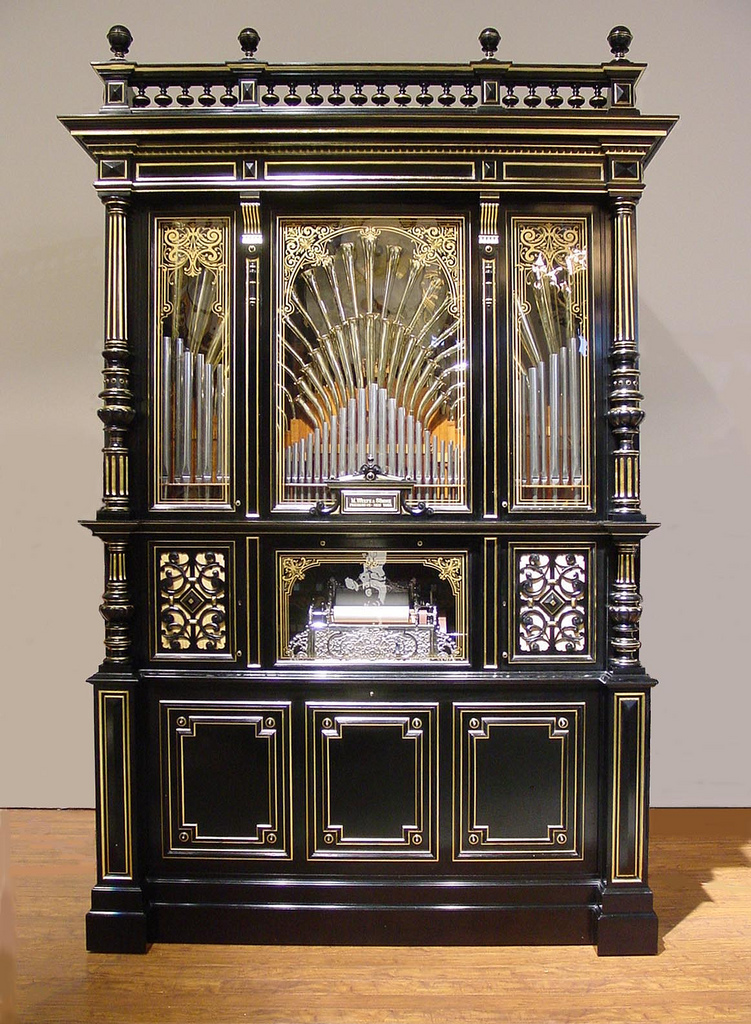
Welte Concert Orchestrion, style 6, number 198 (1895)

M. Welte & Sons, Freiburg and New York was a manufacturer of orchestrions, organs and reproducing pianos, established in Vöhrenbach by Michael Welte (1807–1880) in 1832.

== Overview ==
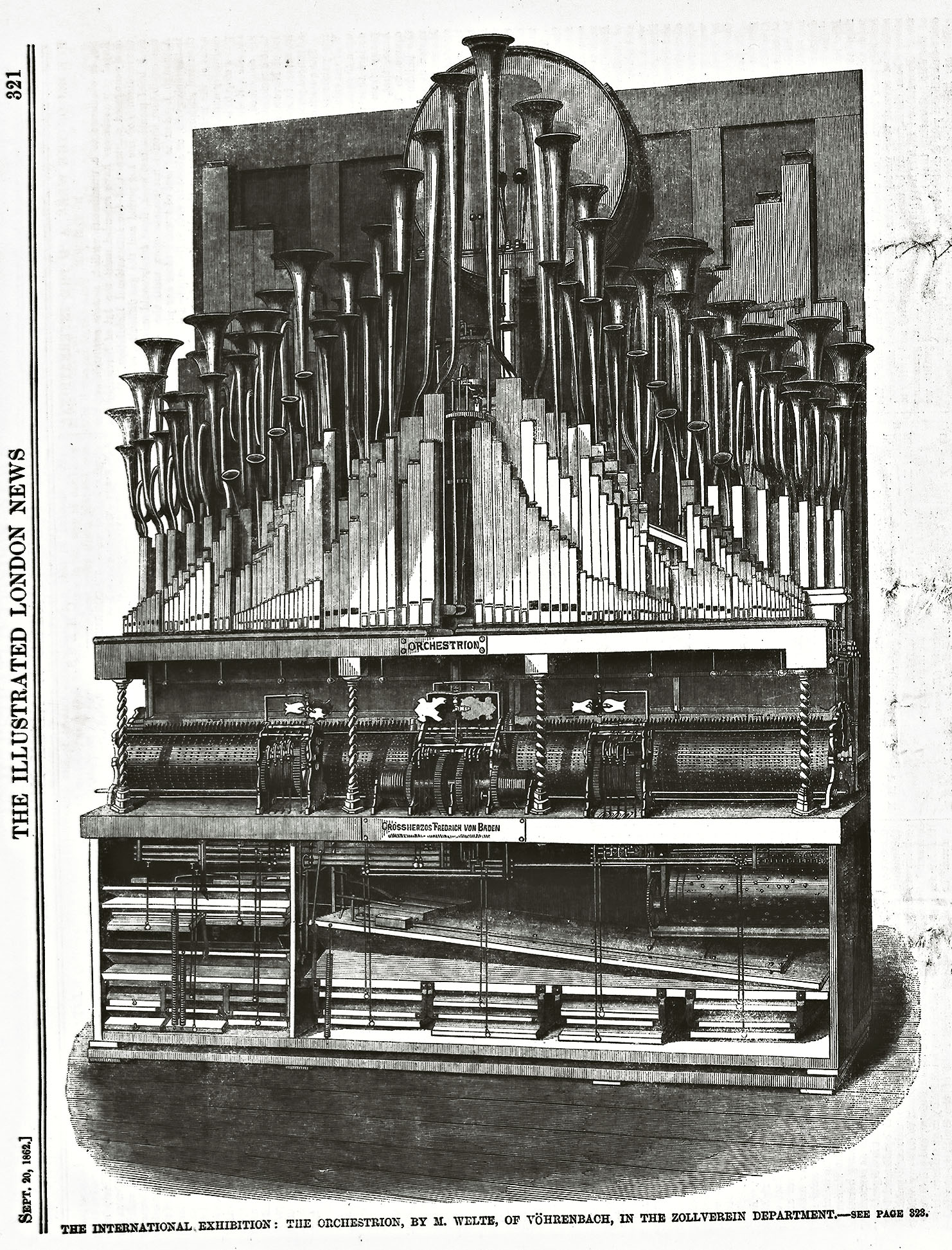
1862 International Exhibition London: The Orchestrion by M. Welte, of Vöhrenbach, in the Zollverein division. (The Illustrated London News, Sept. 20, 1862.)

From 1832 until 1932, the firm produced mechanical musical instruments of the highest quality. The firm's founder, Michael Welte (1807–1880), and his company were prominent in the technical development and construction of orchestrions from 1850, until the early 20th century.

In 1872, the firm moved from the remote Black Forest town of Vöhrenbach into a newly developed business complex beneath the main railway station in Freiburg, Germany. They created an epoch-making development when they substituted the playing gear of their instruments from fragile wood pinned cylinders to perforated paper rolls. In 1883, Emil Welte (1841–1923), the eldest son of Michael, who had emigrated to the United States in 1865, patented the paper roll method (U.S. patent 287,599), the model of the later piano roll. In 1889, the technique was further perfected, and again protected through patents. Later, Welte built only instruments using the new technique, which was also licensed to other companies. With branches in New York and Moscow, and representatives throughout the world, Welte became very well known.

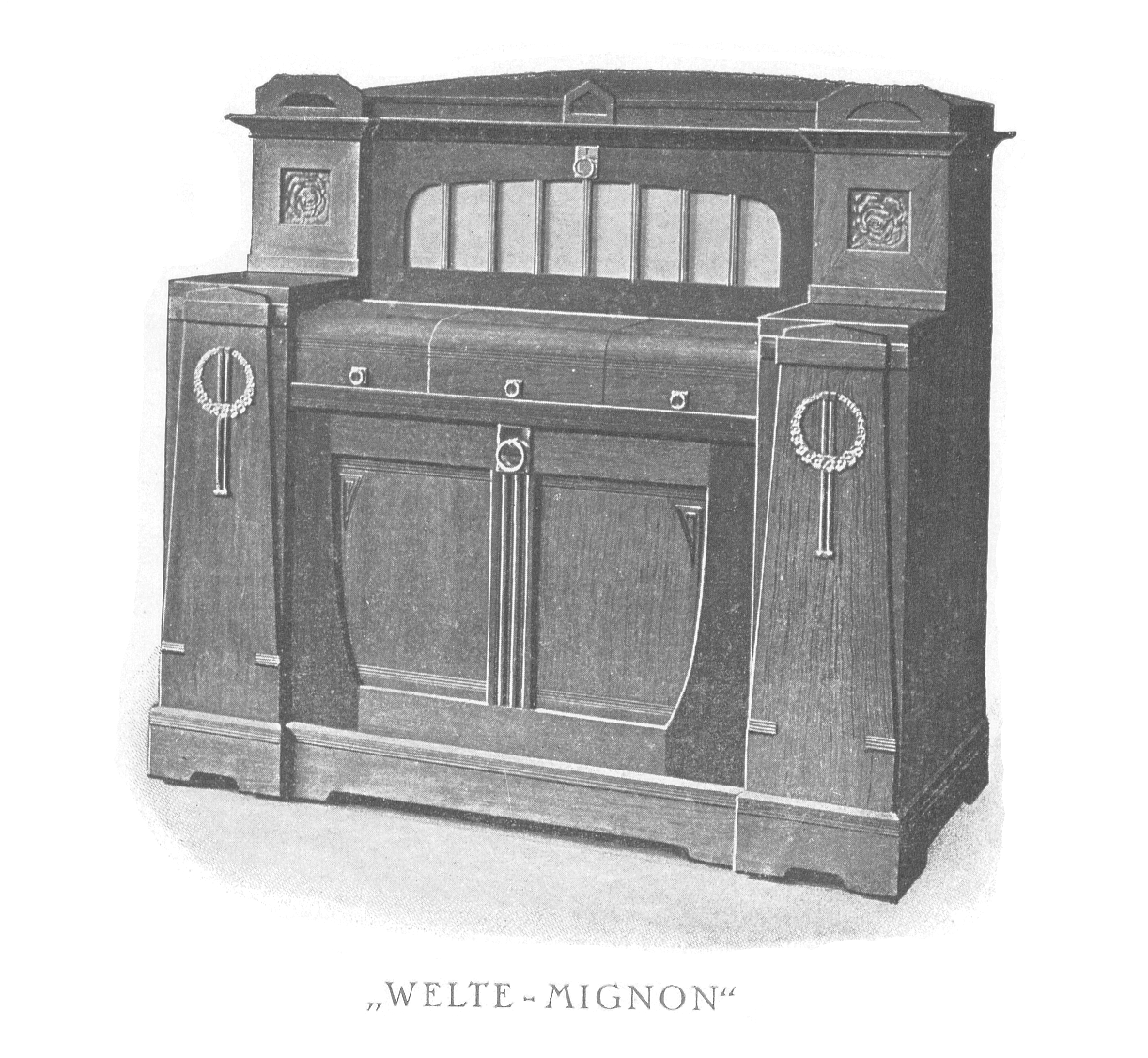
Welte-Mignon "Kabinett", one of the first keyboard-less reproducing pianos, built 1905-ca. 1908

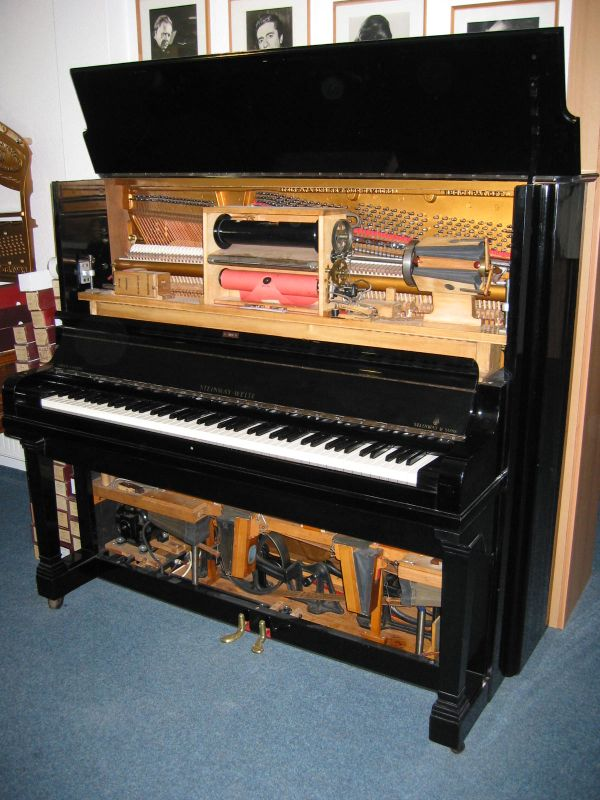
Steinway-Welte reproducing piano (1919)

The firm was already famous for its inventions in the field of the reproduction of music when Welte introduced the Welte-Mignon reproducing piano in 1904. "It automatically replayed the tempo, phrasing, dynamics and pedalling of a particular performance, and not just the notes of the music, as was the case with other player pianos of the time." In September, 1904, the Mignon was demonstrated in the Leipzig Trade Fair. In March, 1905 it became better known when showcased "at the showrooms of Hugo Popper, a manufacturer of roll-operated orchestrions". By 1906, the Mignon was also exported to the United States, installed to pianos by the firms Feurich and Steinway & Sons. As a result of this invention by Edwin Welte (1876–1958) and his brother-in-law Karl Bockisch (1874–1952), one could now record and reproduce the music played by a pianist as true to life as was technologically possible at the time. Most of the renowned pianists of the time recorded for Welte-Mignon, a complete list would go into the hundred.

A Steinway Welte-Mignon reproducing piano and several other player pianos and reproducing pianos can be seen and heard at the Musical Museum, Brentford, England.

== Welte Philharmonic Organ ==
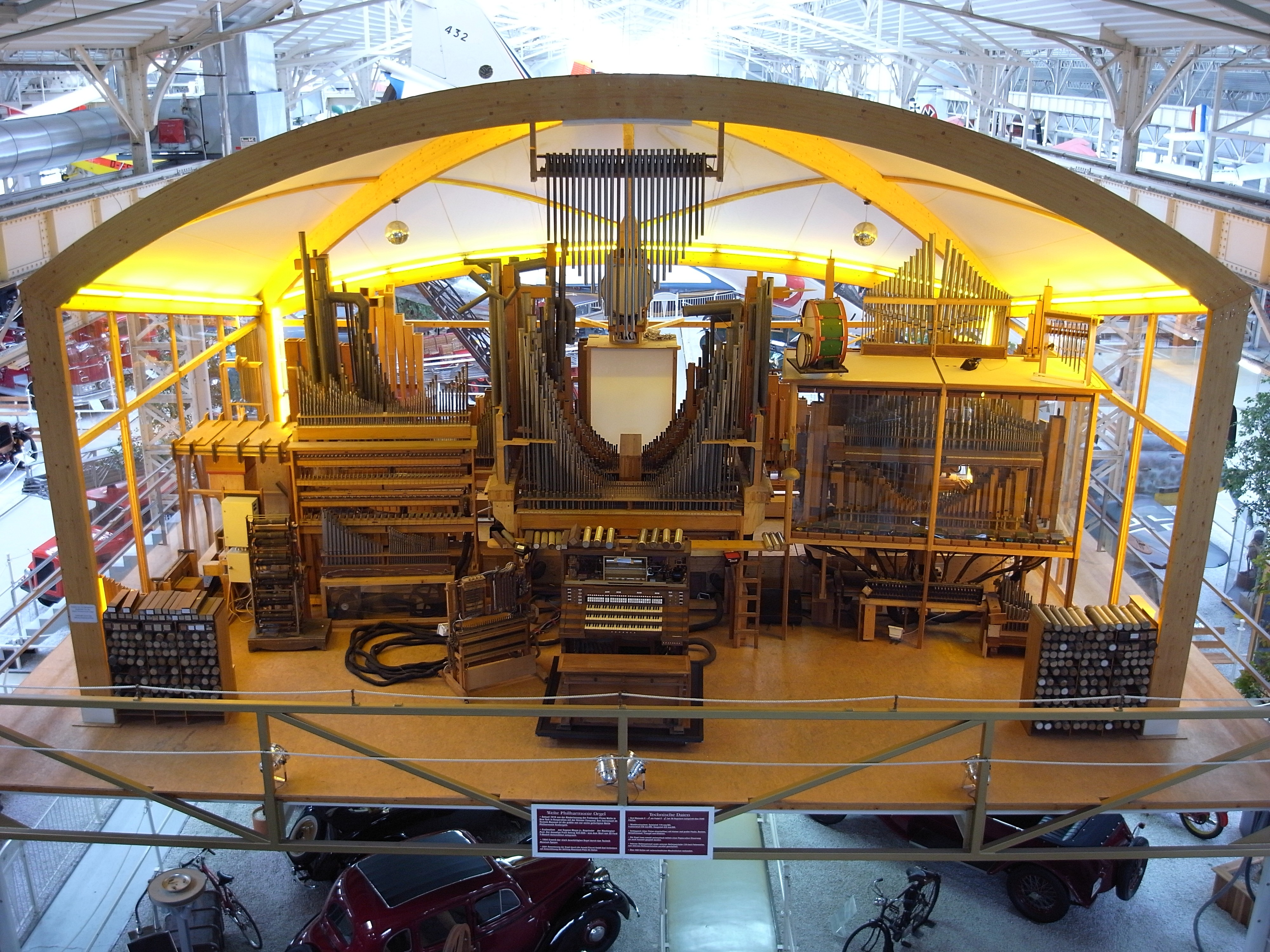
Welte Philharmonic Organ

From 1911 on, a similar system for organs branded "Welte Philharmonic-Organ" was produced. Thirteen well-known European organist-composers of the era, among them Alfred Hollins, Eugene Gigout and Max Reger were photographed recording for the organ, distinguished organists like Edwin Lemare, Clarence Eddy and Joseph Bonnet were recorded too. The largest Philharmonic Organ ever built is at the Salomons Estate of the Markerstudy Group. This instrument was built in 1914 for Sir David Lionel Salomons to play not only rolls for the organ but also for his Welte Orchestrion No. 10 from about 1900, which he traded in for the organ. One of these organs can also be seen in the Scotty's Castle museum in Death Valley where it is played regularly during museum tours. An organ built for HMHS Britannic never made its way to Belfast due to the outbreak of the First World War. It can currently be heard playing in the Swiss National Museum in Seewen.

== Welte Inc. ==
In 1912 a new company was founded, the "M. Welte & Sons. Inc." in New York, and a new factory was built in Poughkeepsie, New York. Shareholders were predominantly family members in the U.S. and Germany, among them Barney Dreyfuss, Edwin's brother-in-law.

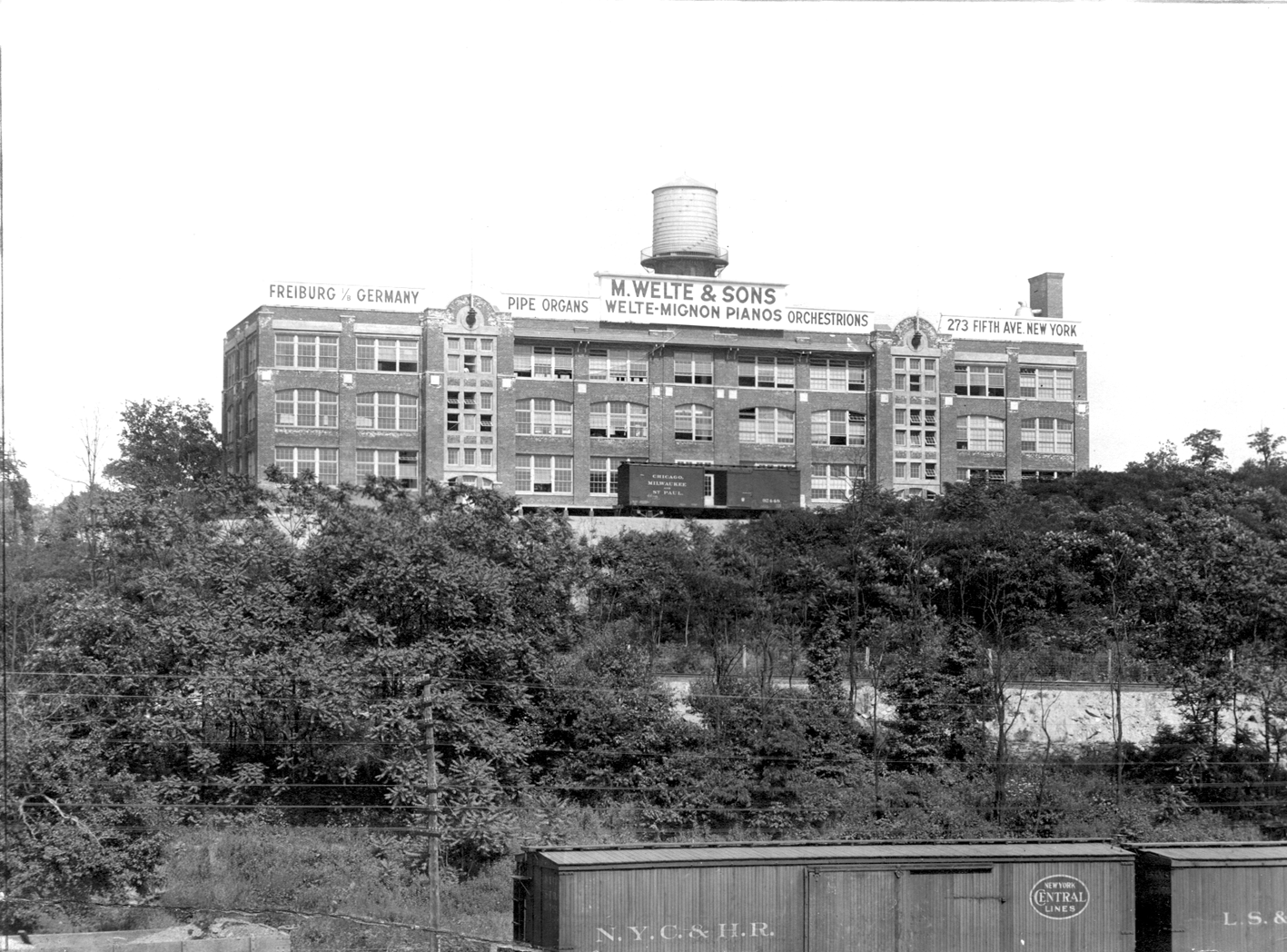
Welte & Sons, Poughkeepsie factory building, 1912. Today: Central Hudson Gas & Electric Corporation

As a result of the Alien Property Custodian enactment during the First World War, the company lost their American branch and all of their U.S. patents. This caused the company great economic hardship. Later the Great Depression and the mass production of new technologies like the radio and the electric record player in the 1920s virtually brought about the demise of the firm and its expensive instruments. Other companies with similar products like American Piano Company (Ampico) and Duo-Art also began to fade from the scene at this time, a list would go into the hundred.

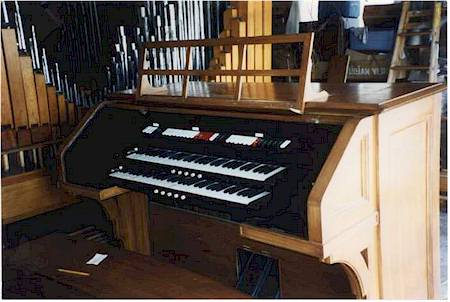
Welte & Sons also built pipe organs.

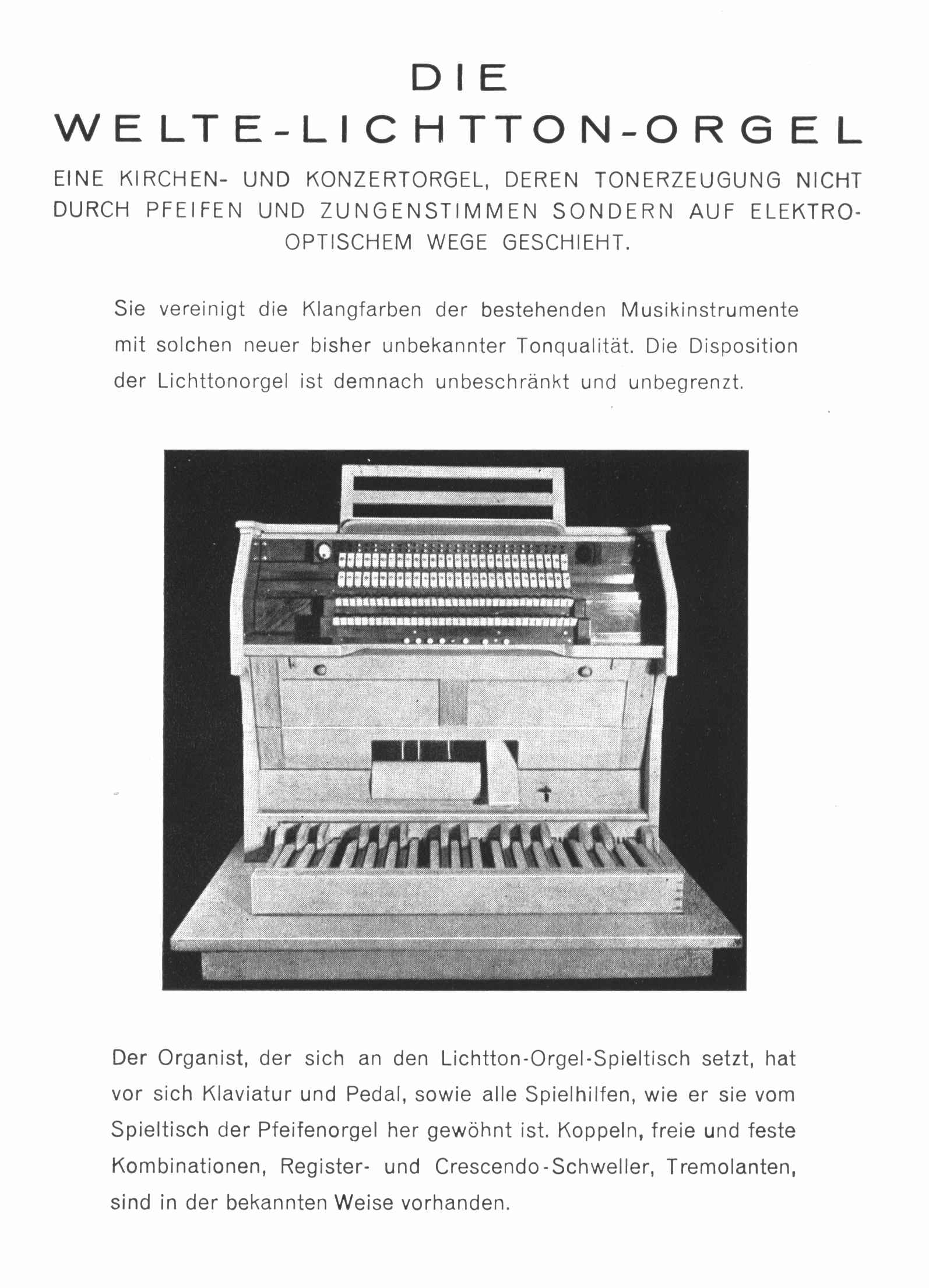
Welte-Lichtton-Orgel (1936)

From 1919 on, Welte also built theatre organs, in particular for installation in cinemas. With the introduction of "talkies" around 1927, the demand for these also began to diminish, and by 1931 production of such instruments had been severely curtailed. The last big theatre organ was a custom-built instrument for the Norddeutscher Rundfunk (NORAG) broadcasting company in Hamburg, still in place and still playing today. A number of other Welte theatre organs survive in museums.

In 1932 the firm, now with Karl Bockisch as sole owner, barely escaped bankruptcy, and began to concentrate on the production of church and other speciality organs.

The last project of Edwin Welte was an electronic organ equipped with photo-cells, the Lichttonorgel or Phototone-Organ. This instrument was the first ever to use analogue sampled sound. In 1936, a prototype of this type of organ was demonstrated at a concert in the Berliner Philharmonie. The production of these organs - in cooperation with the Telefunken Company – was halted by the Nazi-government because the inventor, Edwin Welte, was married to Betty Dreyfuss, who was Jewish.

The business complex in Freiburg was bombed and completely destroyed in November 1944 by Operation Tigerfish . This event seemed to obliterate the closely kept secrets of the firm and their recording apparatus and recording process appeared lost forever. But in recent years parts of the recording apparatus for the Welte Philharmonic-Organs and documents were found in the United States. It was then possible to theoretically reconstruct the recording process. The Augustiner Museum of Freiburg keeps the legacy of the company – all that survived the Second World War.

== Media ==
- Ossip Gabrilowitsch plays for Welte-Mignon on July 4, 1905 Johannes Brahms Intermezzo in C major, Op. 119, No. 3*
- Arthur Nikisch plays for Welte-Mignon on February 9, 1906, Johannes Brahms Hungarian Dance No. 5*
- Gabriel Faure plays his Pavane, Op.50 1913
- See and hear a Welte-Mignon piano roll play Mon Reve by Hanna Vollenhoven

Welte Mignon made several organs for important churches as did Welte-Tripp. One of the last surviving instruments is in the Church of the Covenant, Boston Mass. This was restored by Austin several years ago – supposedly to the original state. It was altered by an organist in 1959 or 1960. Until that time it has been careful restored and releathered by the Reed-Treanor organ company. This included the entire combination action in the console and the manual relays in the church basement and the repair of the massive 25 HP DC motor that powered the Spencer Turbine blower. During the two years they cared for the organ no tonal or structural changes were made.
