= Winifred MacBride =

Scottish classical pianist

- Winifred MacBride, from a 1926 newspaper.

Background information
- Also known as: Winifred MacBride Thomas
- Born: Glasgow
- Genres: Classical
- Occupation: Pianist
- Instrument: Piano
- Years active: 1918–1959

Winifred MacBride (born before 1900; died after 1975), later Winifred MacBride Thomas, was a Scottish-born concert pianist who achieved international acclaim in the first half of the twentieth century, particularly for her interpretations of the works of Beethoven and Tchaikovsky. She also taught piano at Catawba College in North Carolina.

== Early life ==
Winifred MacBride was born in Glasgow, Scotland. She studied piano at the London Royal College of Music; she also studied with Benno Moiseiwitsch. Her younger sister Florence MacBride played violin, and the sisters played a concert together in Glasgow in 1926.

== Career ==
=== In concert ===
MacBride gave a debut recital at London's Aeolian Hall in 1918. In 1923 she was on the programme for the Proms. Her 1924 concert at Queen's Hall, London, conducted by Sir Henry J. Wood, garnered critical raves for her technical virtuosity as well as the intelligence of her interpretive skills. MacBride was praised for her "intellectual serenity" and "radiance," the "elegance of her phrasing and touch," and her "unfailing technique." Others commented on her "spacious and sympathetic style," "admirable fire," and "her clear insight into the meaning of the music."

MacBride made her American debut in October 1924, at Aeolian Hall in New York. Other New York appearances include multiple concerts at Town Hall in 1929 and 1930. She played with the Minneapolis Symphony in 1926, and recorded piano rolls for Ampico.

=== In North Carolina ===
In the 1940s, MacBride Thomas lived in North Carolina and taught piano privately, and as Assistant Professor of Piano at Catawba College, where her husband was head of the music department. The couple were dismissed from their faculty positions in 1952, on the basis of "disloyalty to the administration of the college, manifested by slanderous statements to students, faculty members and others, and by the incitement of unrest, suspicion, and lack of confidence among students and faculty members." The couple sued for wrongful dismissal, and the AAUP defended the Thomases from the charges. Their suit for damages went to the North Carolina Supreme Court, where it was dismissed in 1958.

MacBride Thomas continued to appear as a guest artist periodically with symphony orchestras, including the Charlotte Symphony Orchestra. She and her husband also gave combined "lecture recitals" at the Mint Museum in the 1950s. She appeared as a soloist with the Charlotte Little Symphony on a television program, "The Carolina Hour", in 1956.

== Personal life ==
In 1920, Winifred MacBride married English-born organist and composer Christopher J. Thomas; they lived in Charlotte, North Carolina. She was widowed when Thomas died in 1976.
