= Player piano =

Piano that plays prerecorded works

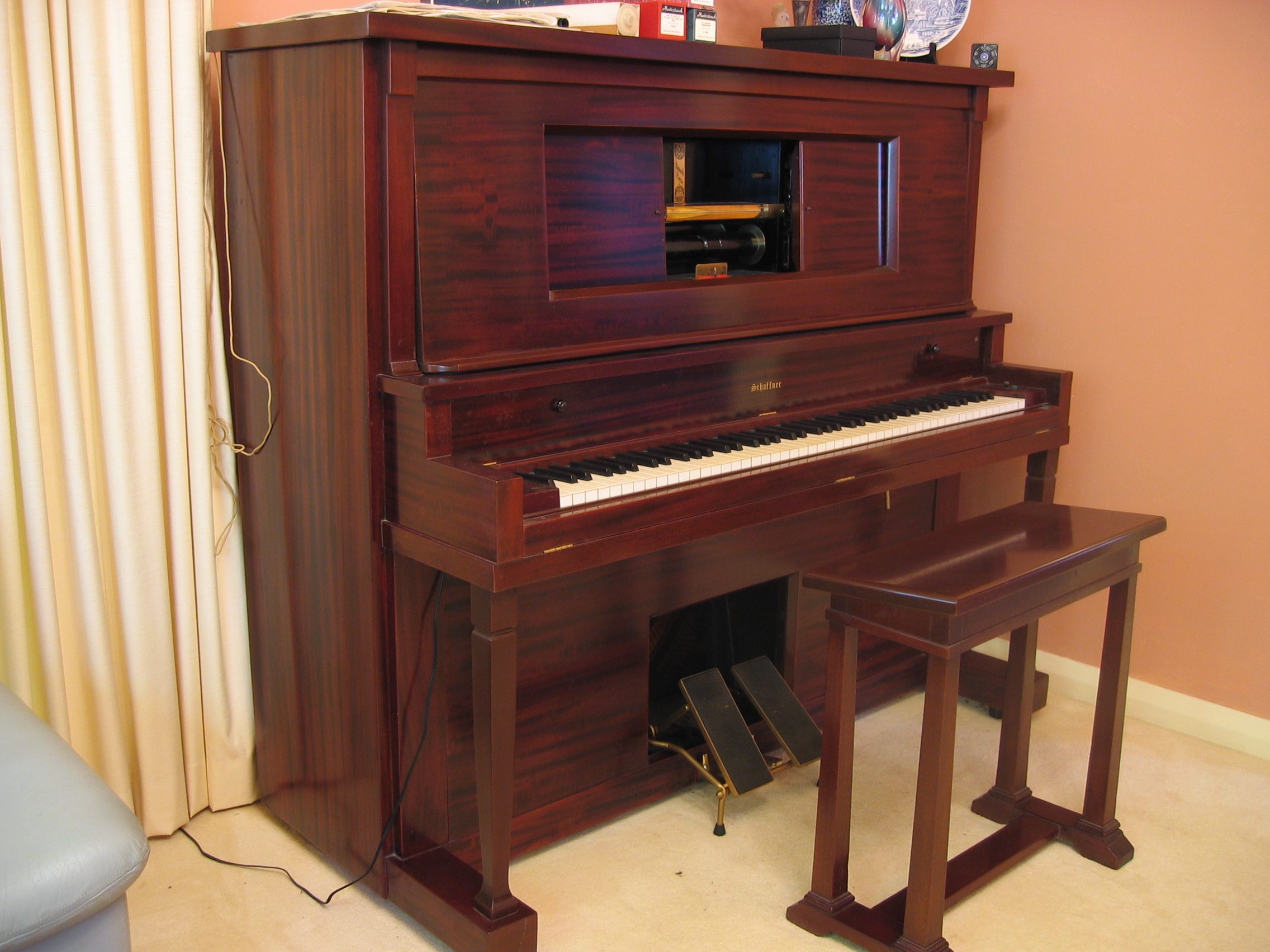
A restored pneumatic player piano

Steinway reproducing piano from 1920. Harold Bauer playing Saint-Saëns' Piano Concerto No. 2 in G minor, Op. 22, excerpt of 3rd movement. Duo-Art recording 5973-4

A player piano is a self-playing piano with a pneumatic or electromechanical mechanism that operates the piano action using perforated paper or metallic rolls. Modern versions use MIDI. The player piano gained popularity as mass-produced home pianos increased in the late 19th and early 20th centuries. Sales peaked in 1924 and subsequently declined with improvements in electrical phonograph recordings in the mid-1920s. The advent of electrical amplification in home music reproduction, brought by radios, contributed to a decline in popularity, and the stock market crash of 1929 marked the end of their prominence.

== History ==
The first practical pneumatic piano player, manufactured by the Aeolian Company and called the "Pianola", was invented in 1896 by Edwin S. Votey, and came into widespread use in the 20th century. The name "pianola", sometimes used as a generic name for any player piano, came from this invention. The mechanism of this player piano was all-pneumatic: foot-operated bellows provided a vacuum to operate a pneumatic motor and drive the take-up spool, while each small inrush of air through a hole in the paper roll was amplified in two stages to sufficient strength to strike a note.

=== 1900–1910 ===
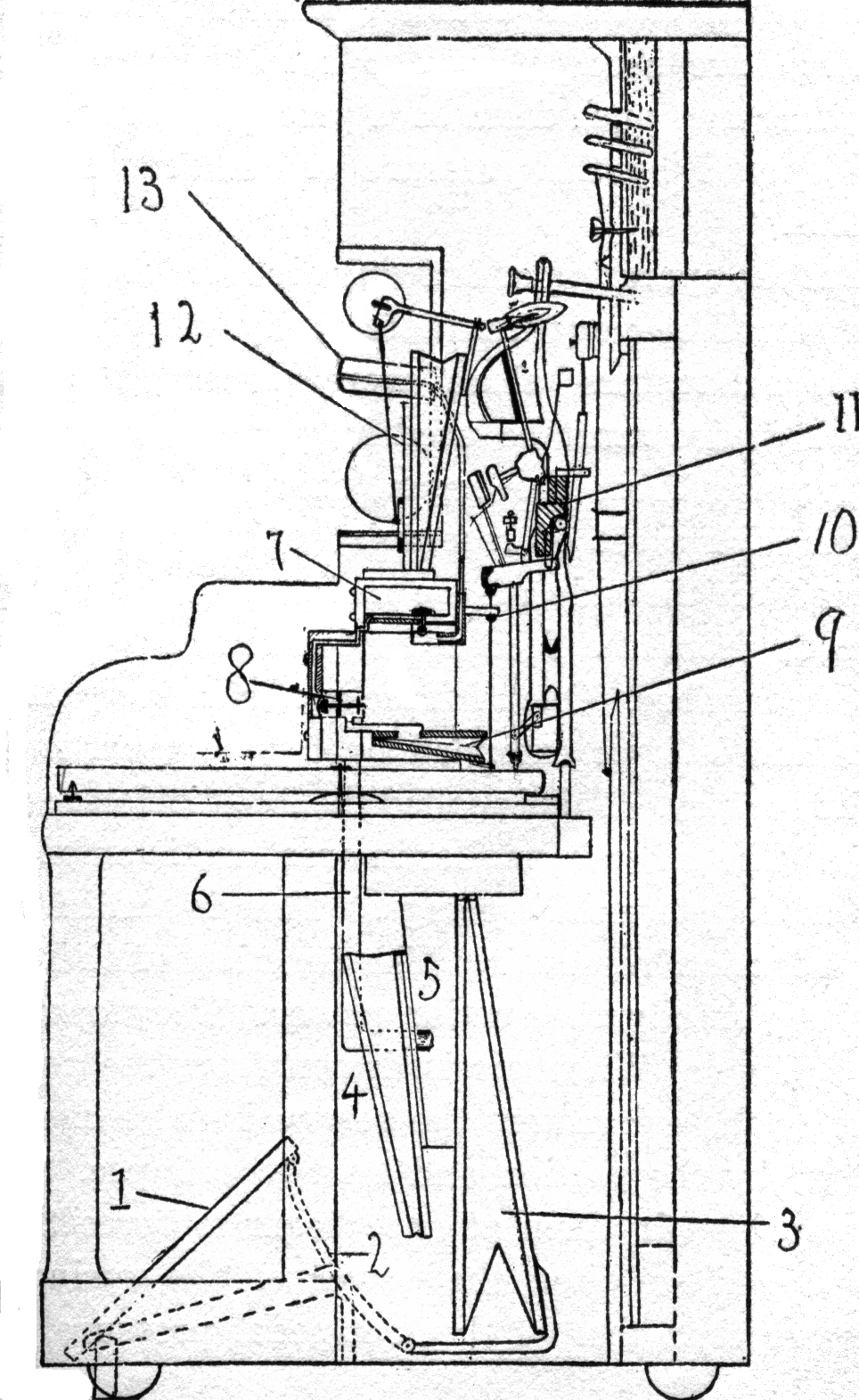
The mechanism of a player piano.: 1. Pedal.; 2. Pedal connection.; 3. Exhauster (one only shown).; 4. Reservoir; high tension (low-tension reservoir not shown.); 5. Exhaust trunk.; 6. Exhaust tube to motor.; 7. Air space above primary valves.; 8. Secondary valves.; 9. Striker pneumatic.; 10. Connection from pneumatic to action of piano.; 11. Piano action.; 12. Pneumatic motor (Air Motor).; 13. Trackerbar (music roll passes over trackerbar).

Votey advertised the Pianola widely, making unprecedented use of full-page color advertisements. It was sold initially for $250, and then other, cheaper makes were launched. A standard 65-note format evolved, with 11 1/4-inch-wide (290 mm) rolls and holes spaced 6 to the inch, although several player manufacturers used their own form of roll incompatible with other makes.

By 1903, the Aeolian Company had more than 9,000 roll titles in their catalog, adding 200 titles per month. Many companies' catalogs ran to thousands of rolls, mainly consisting of light, religious, or classical music. Ragtime music also featured.

Melville Clark introduced two important features to the player piano: the full-scale roll which could play every note on the piano keyboard, and the internal player as standard.

By the end of the decade, the piano player device and the 65-note format became obsolete. This caused problems for many small manufacturers, who had already invested in 65-note player operations, ultimately resulting in rapid consolidation in the industry.

A new, full-scale roll format, playing all 88 notes, was agreed at an industry conference in Buffalo, New York in 1908 at the so-called Buffalo Convention. This kept the 11 1/4-inch roll, but now had smaller holes spaced at 9 to the inch. This meant that any player piano could now play any make of roll. This consensus was crucial for avoiding a costly format war, which plagued almost every other form of entertainment medium that followed roll music.

While the player piano matured in America, an inventor in Germany, Edwin Welte, was working on a player which would reproduce all aspects of a performance automatically, so that the machine would play back a recorded performance exactly as if the original pianist were sitting at the piano keyboard. Known as a Reproducing Piano, this device, the Welte-Mignon, was launched in 1904. It created new marketing opportunities, as manufacturers could now get the foremost pianists and composers of the day to record their performances on a piano roll. This allowed owners of player pianos to experience a professional performance in their own homes on their own instruments, exactly as the original pianist had played it.

Aeolian introduced Metrostyle in 1901 and the Themodist in 1904, the Themodist being an invention which was said to bring out the melody clearly above the accompaniment. Sales grew rapidly, and with the instruments now relatively mature, in this decade a wider variety of rolls became available. Two major advances were the introduction of the hand-played roll, both classical and popular, and the word roll.

- Hand-played rolls introduced musical phrasing into the rolls, so that player pianists did not have to introduce it through the use of tempo controls or expression levers/buttons, which few felt inclined to do.
- Word rolls featured printed lyrics in the margins, making it simple to use players to accompany singing in the home, a popular activity before radio and disc recordings became widely available.

The other major advance was the arrival in America of two commercial rivals for the Welte-Mignon Reproducing Piano: the Ampico (from 1911 but fully 're-enacting' by 1916) and the Duo-Art (1914). Artrio-Angelus also introduced a reproducing player from 1916. When World War I came in 1914, German patents were seized in the US. In England, Aeolian had a huge factory and sales network and easily outsold the Ampico. Other makers of Reproducing systems, Hupfeld Meisterspiel DEA (1907) and Philipps Duca (c 1909), were successful in Europe. Hupfeld perfected an 88 note reproducing system, the Triphonola, in 1919, and around 5% of players sold were Reproducing Pianos.

In America by the end of the decade, the new 'jazz age' and the rise of the fox-trot confirmed the player piano as the instrument of popular music, with classical music increasingly relegated to the reproducing piano. Most American roll companies stopped offering large classical catalogs before 1920, and abandoned 'instrumental' rolls (those without words) within a few years.

In England, the Aeolian Company continued to sell classical material, and customers remained willing to contribute to performances by following directions printed on the rolls and operate the hand and foot controls themselves. Sydney Grew, in his manual The Art of the Piano Player, published in London in 1922, said that "it takes about three years to make a good player-pianist of a man or woman of average musical intelligence. It takes about seven years to make a good pianist, or organist, or singer". Word rolls never became popular in England, as they cost 20% more than non-word rolls. As a result, post-World War I American and British roll collections looked very different.

=== 1950–present ===
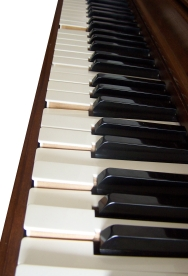
A player piano performing

In the early 1950s, player pianos and other instruments of the 1920s and earlier became collectable. An enthusiast, Frank Holland, who had collected player pianos while working in Canada, returned to England and held meetings of like-minded enthusiasts at his house in London. In 1959 this gathering was formalized as 'The Player Piano Group', and in the early 1960s Holland founded the British Piano Museum (now the Musical Museum) in Brentford.

In America, another collector, Harvey Roehl, published a book called Player Piano Treasury in 1961. This sold in large numbers and was followed by books published by Roehl's Vestal Press on how to rebuild and restore the instruments. Other societies were formed worldwide to preserve and study all aspects of mechanical music, among them the Musical Box Society International (MBSI) and the Automatic Musical Instruments Collector's Association (AMICA) in the USA.

The revival of interest in player pianos in the 1960s led to renewed production. Aeolian revived the Pianola, this time in a small spinet piano suited to post-war housing, and other manufacturers followed. QRS offered a traditional player piano in its Story and Clark piano. Early enthusiasts could often get by with limited patching and repairs, although original 1920s instruments could still be found in working order. Complete rebuilding of old instruments to original condition became popular.

== Types ==
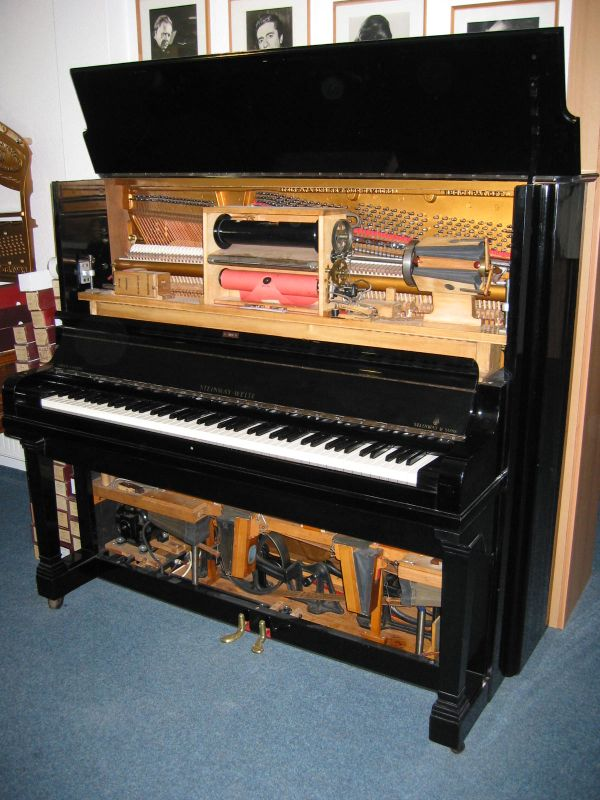
Steinway Welte-Mignon reproducing piano (1919)

A player piano is a piano that contains a manually controlled, pneumatically operated piano player mechanism. The operator manipulates control levers to produce a musical performance. Various aids were developed:

Split stack control
In these instruments (the vast majority of all player pianos) the pneumatic player mechanism is divided into two approximately equal halves. The operator can lower the volume of either half of the keyboard independently of the other.
Theme control
These instruments have peripheral pneumatic hardware systems which, when used in conjunction with special music rolls, are able to highlight notes in the score which are intended to be emphasised while others are made quieter. Basic theme pianos subdue all notes and release full power to only those notes which are aligned with certain music roll "theme" perforations. Subtler systems (such as Hupfeld's "Solodant" and Aeolian's "Themodist") have a graduated theme control, in which the background subdued level and the foreground melody level are both controllable. The nature of the mechanism is such that where a chord occurs, notes to be emphasised have to be advanced slightly away from their neighbours in order for the mechanism to identify them.
Isolated theme
The hardware of these pianos is able to pick out the melody notes from the background accompaniment within the entire range of the keyboard, without the need to break up chords. Manufacturers of these systems were the UK "Dalian" and "Kastonome" and the US "Solo Carola".
Expression player
The hardware of these pianos is able to generate a broad general musical dynamic from roll coding. The pneumatic stack operates at fixed, pre-set tension depending on the coding, giving an effect of musical dynamics. Examples of this system are "Recordo" and "Empeco"
Reproducing pianos
These are fully automated versions of the player piano, requiring no human control to produce the effect of a live musical performance. This is achieved with music rolls in which tempo mapping is incorporated into the rolls and the note lengths of a live performance have been captured. The volume dynamics are created by peripheral accessories controlled by the music roll coding, which removes the need to operate control levers. An electric motor provides power. Most reproducing pianos are capable of being played manually, and many are constructed for dual function. Numerous companies made these, and the first successful instrument was the "Mignon", launched by Welte in 1904.

== Music rolls ==
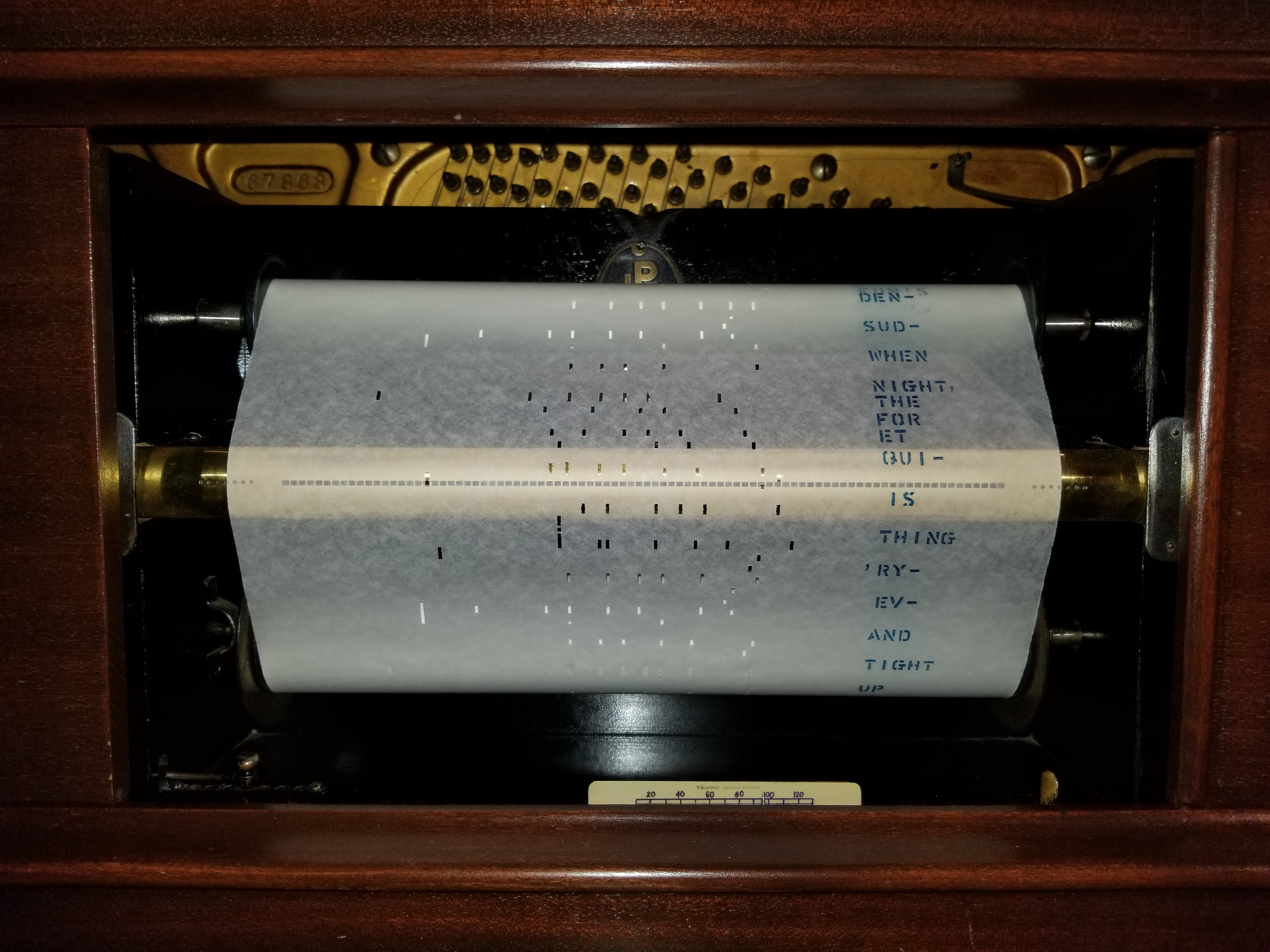
A player piano roll being played

Music rolls for pneumatic player pianos, often known as piano rolls, consist of a continuous sheet of paper rolled on to a spool. The spool fits into the player piano spool box whereupon the free end of the music sheet is hooked onto the take-up spool which will unwind the roll at an even pace across the reading mechanism (the "tracker bar"). The music score to be played is programmed onto the paper by means of perforations. Different player systems have different perforation sizes, channel layouts and spool fittings though the majority conform to one or two predominant formats latterly adopted as the industry standard.

Music is programmed via a number of methods.

1. the music is marked out on master stencil on a purely metronomic basis direct from the printed sheet music with the player-pianists being left to create their own music performance
2. the music stencil is created metronomically via a piano-keyboard operated punch machine
3. a live performance is played onto a special piano connected to an electronically operated marking mechanism, and a physical stencil is produced from this live output, either as-is or after some general regularisation of tempo where necessary
4. modern computer software and MIDI software can be used to create piano roll stencils for operating modern-day perforating machines and create new titles.

The player piano sold globally in its heyday, and music rolls were manufactured extensively in the US, as well as most European countries, South America, Australia, New Zealand, and Japan. A large number of titles from all manufacturers survive to this day, and rolls still turn up regularly in large quantities.

It was reported that the last remaining mass producer of piano rolls in the world, QRS Music, temporarily halted production of the rolls on December 31, 2008. However, QRS Music still list themselves as the only roll manufacturer remaining, and claim to have 45,000 titles available with "new titles being added on a regular basis".

The Musical Museum in Brentford, London, England, houses a nationally significant collection of piano rolls, with over 20,000 rolls, as well as an extensive collection of instruments which may be seen and heard.

== Modern implementations ==
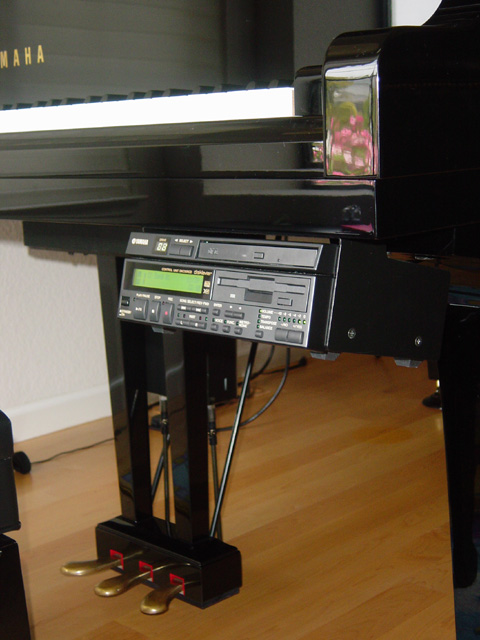
Player and control unit of Yamaha Disklavier Mark III

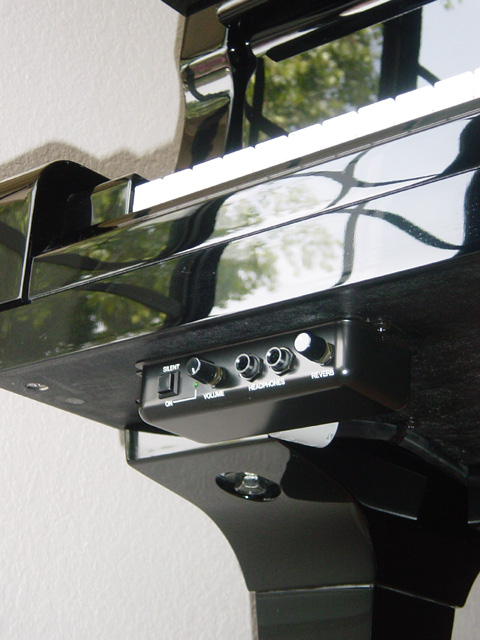
Sequencer control unit of Yamaha Disklavier Mark III

Later developments of the reproducing piano include the use of magnetic tape and floppy disks, rather than piano rolls, to record and play back the music; and, in the case of one instrument made by Bösendorfer, computer-assisted playback.

In 1982, Yamaha Corporation introduced the "Piano Player", which was the first mass-produced, commercially available reproducing piano that was capable of digitally capturing and reproducing a piano performance using floppy disk as a storage medium. The Piano Player was replaced in 1987 by the Yamaha Disklavier and since 1998, the Disklavier PRO models are capable of capturing and reproducing "high-resolution" piano performances of up to 1024 velocity levels and 256 increments of positional pedaling using Yamaha's proprietary XP (Extended Precision) MIDI specification.

Almost all modern player pianos use MIDI to interface with computer equipment. Most modern player pianos come with an electronic device that can record and playback MIDI files on floppy disks and/or CD-ROMs, and a MIDI interface that enables computers to drive the piano directly for more advanced operations. The MIDI files can trigger solenoids, which use electric current to drive small mechanical plungers mounted to the key action inside the piano. Live performance or computer generated music can be recorded in MIDI file format for accurate reproduction later on such instruments. MIDI files containing converted antique piano-rolls can be purchased on the Internet.

As of 2006, several player piano conversion kits are available (PianoDisc, PNOmation, etc.), allowing the owners of normal pianos to convert them into computer controlled instruments. The conversion process usually involves cutting open the bottom of the piano to install mechanical parts under the keyboard, although one organization—Logos Foundation—has manufactured a portable, external kit. A new player piano conversion kit was introduced in 2007–08 by Wayne Stahnke, the inventor of the Bösendorfer SE reproducing system, called the "LX".

As of 2023, Steinway manufactures a player piano based on Wayne Stahnke's Live Performance LX system, which was sold to Steinway in 2014 and re-branded as Spirio. Unlike other piano brands, a recording option was not originally available, but in 2019 Steinway introduced Spirio | r models, which can also record.

Edelweiss is a British music upcomer on the player piano market offering totally bespoke pianos, available in luxury department store Harrods since 2017 and according to the Financial Times YouTube channel 'How to Spend it', Edelweiss is "regarded as the most upmarket of today's breed of the self-playing piano".

== Comparison to electric pianos ==
A player piano is not an electric piano, electronic piano, or a digital piano. The distinction between these instruments lies in the way sounds are produced. A player piano is an acoustic piano which produces sound by a hammer striking on the piano strings. Electrical components in post-pneumatic versions are limited to moving the keys or hammers mimicking the actions of a person; sound is not generated or amplified electronically.

== See also ==
- Mechanical organ
- Punched tape
- Virtual piano
- Circus Galop, a piano piece specifically designed for the player piano
- Conlon Nancarrow, a significant composer for the player piano
