= Automatic Musical Instruments Collector's Association =

Automatic Musical Instruments Collectors' Association
- Industry: Charitable, tax-exempt association
- Founded: 1963
- Key people: John Motto-Ros, President
- Number of employees: 1,300 worldwide
- Website: Official Website

The Automatic Musical Instruments Collectors' Association (AMICA) was formed in 1963 by a group of collectors in the San Francisco area, committed to the preservation, restoration and enjoyment of vintage mechanical musical instruments that play by themselves, focusing on those made from 1885–1935. Typical examples include player pianos, reproducing pianos, player reed organs, player pipe organs, orchestrions, music boxes, fairground organs, etc. Music media includes paper music rolls, folding continuous cardboard music, pinned cylinders, and pinned discs, etc. The scope of interest embraces not only the instruments themselves, but also their music media and published literature of the whole of the industry throughout this era.

Since 1964, the association has grown to some 1,300 members worldwide, with 13 Chapters throughout the USA. It is now affiliated with 15 related associations, societies and institutions. It holds annual conventions and from time to time these are held in foreign locations such as the United Kingdom (1995), Australia (2001) and Germany (2007).
