= Duo-Art =

Reproducing piano technology

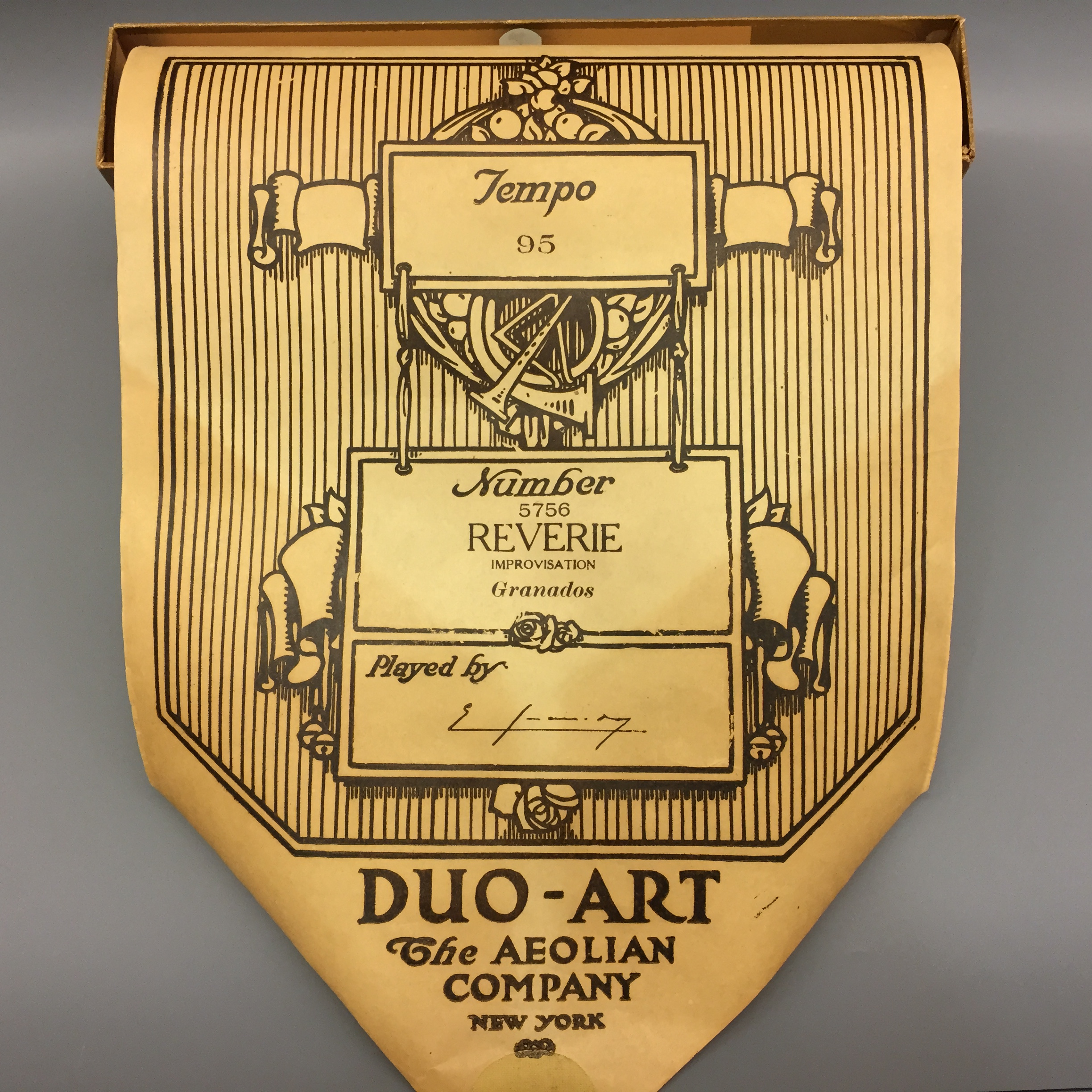
Duo-Art artist roll, played by Enrique Granados, at Museu de la Música de Barcelona

Duo-Art was one of the leading reproducing piano technologies of the early 20th century, the others being American Piano Company (Ampico), introduced in 1913 too, and Welte-Mignon in 1905. These technologies flourished at that time because of the poor quality of the early Phonograph (Gramophone in Britain). Between 1913 and 1925 a number of distinguished classical and popular pianists, such as Ignace Paderewski, Josef Hofmann, Percy Grainger, Teresa Carreño, Aurelio Giorni, Robert Armbruster and Vladimir Horowitz, recorded for Duo-Art, and their rolls are a legacy of 19th-century and early 20th-century aesthetic and musical practice. The recording process – using a piano wired to a perforating machine – was unable to capture the pianist's dynamics automatically. These were added by a recording technician, who manipulated hand controls to notate the dynamics onto the recording 'master'. Thus, post-recording editing was required to produce the finished performance – usually a joint effort by the recording technician and the actual pianist, who approved the final product. Thus, these recordings do represent the overall style of these great artists and are a good representation of their live performances.

The Aeolian Company introduced the Duo-Art mechanism in 1913. It was most commonly installed in piano brands manufactured by Aeolian such as Weber, Steck, Wheelock, and Stroud. Most notably, it was also available in Steinway pianos under an exclusive agreement. Aeolian had been under pressure to make the mechanism available in Steinway pianos, but Steinway had no interest in pursuing a relationship with a company they saw as a competitor. To appease Steinway, Aeolian agreed to stop promoting its Weber brand as a premium brand, and stop sponsoring concerts by Paderewski and other pianists. The agreement also stipulated that Aeolian purchase a certain number of Steinway units each year, regardless of whether or not they could sell them. This contract eventually became a huge financial burden after the Wall Street crash of 1929. In 1925, its peak year, Aeolian produced more than 190,000 instruments, but the crash, the electric phonograph and the "talkies" all combined to drive the business into a terminal decline.

Several Duo-Art pianos may be seen and heard at the Musical Museum, Brentford, England.
