= NorShor Theatre =

Venue in Duluth, Minnesota

Coordinates: 46.78929°N 92.0954°W

The NorShor Theatre is an entertainment venue in downtown Duluth, Minnesota, and was formerly a movie palace and Opera House. It occupies a prominent place along Superior Street, and underwent a massive renovation effort by the City of Duluth. The NorShor played a significant role in the artistic history of Duluth, and is generally considered a landmark.

== History ==
The history of the site traces its beginnings back to the Grand Opera House, which was built at the location in 1883. The 1,000 seat Opera House also housed a library, and was home to the local Kitchi Gammi Club. Unfortunately, the opera house was destroyed by a fire in 1889.

The modern-day NorShor traces its history back to 1910, when it began as the Orpheum Theatre, located on the former site of the Grand Opera House. It was a Classical Revival-style theatre, and was a premier venue for Vaudeville performances in Duluth. In addition to Vaudeville acts and other performances, the Orpheum was one of Duluth's earliest movie theatres.

During the age of silent films, many movie theatres were equipped with a theatre organ, to accompany the silent films with music and sound effects. In 1925, an ornate looking organ made by the Geneva Organ Company was installed in the auditorium. The organ had 2 manuals and 8 ranks of pipes.

But by the 1940s, the Silent Film era, as well as the Vaudeville era were over, and the Orpheum needed to be reinvented to stay in business and remain relevant. It was renamed the NorShor, and was remodeled in a fabulous Art Deco style. The new NorShor featured a 125-foot tall exterior tower made of porcelain. The tower contained 3,000 lights, making it visible for a long distance, as a notable feature of Duluth's skyline. The tower was subsequently removed in later years, and plans to replace it were scrapped during the renovations.

By the mid-2000s, the building had lost most of its former glory. As the condition of the building was deteriorating, the theatre's local reputation was also in decline.

== 2010 acquisition and redevelopment by the city ==
In June 2010, the Duluth Economic Development Authority purchased the NorShor, along with the adjacent Temple Opera buildings for a combined total of $2.6 million. Although the city has sometimes been criticized for this move, the decision has been defended by Duluth's Mayor (at the time), Don Ness, who cited an improvement in the building's neighborhood, with the elimination of the strip club. Ness has said the NorShor was "key to the revitalization of the entire downtown district."

In 2014, the city landed $6.95 million from a state bonding bill from the Minnesota Legislature, for use in renovating the NorShor. Although this was only a part of the $22.3 million needed for the complete overall renovation, it was a critical first step that would help ensure future funding sources come through. In a June 8, 2014, article in the Duluth News Tribune, Ness was quoted as saying, "If we hadn't taken ownership of the building ... we would have continued to have a strip club there with gang activity and prostitution and drug dealing. And that's in a prominent place on Superior Street. It would have been a continual black eye on that part of downtown. And the building would have eventually fallen apart."

In addition to the bonding funds, other fundraising efforts were ongoing. And helping to ensure the successful future of the NorShore, the city identified the Duluth Playhouse as the facility's manager and operator, once the reconstruction would be complete. And developer George Sherman was named as the developer for the restoration project.

== The NorShor today ==
After 19 months of construction and renovations, the Norshor finally opened on February 1, 2018. The first performance was Mamma Mia!.

The new NorShor, with a 600-seat, stadium-style, balconied, live-performance auditorium, is expected to generate an estimated $5 million to $6 million of annual economic benefit. Restorations included an extension of the stage, making the building handicap accessible, and adding modern state-of-the-art theatre equipment. A new bar and lounge are also new features.

Being managed by the Duluth Playhouse, the NorShor is now a major presenter of arts and entertainment in the Twin Ports region.

== See also ==
- Movie palace
