= Sidney Torch =

British musical artist (1908–1990)

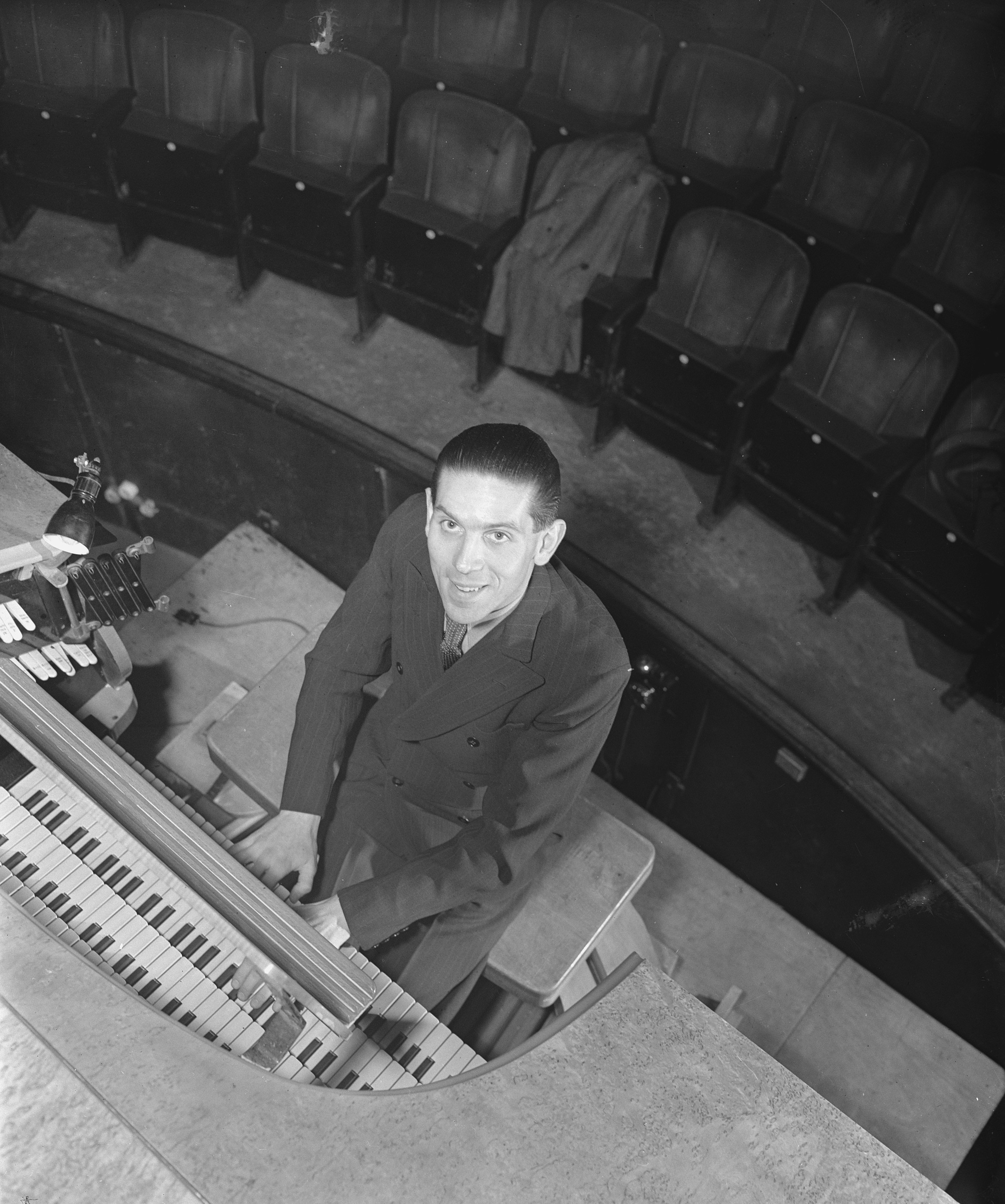

Background information
- Born: Sidney Torchinsky; 5 June 1908; St Pancras, London, England, UK
- Died: 16 July 1990 (aged 82) Eastbourne, Sussex, England, UK
- Genre: Light music
- Occupation: Conductor
- Instruments: Piano, theatre organ
- Labels: Regal, Columbia, Decca, Parlophone

Sidney Torch (born Sidney Torchinsky; 5 June 1908 – 16 July 1990) was a British pianist, cinema organist, conductor, orchestral arranger and a composer of light music.

== Early life ==
Torch was born of Russian Jewish origin to a Ukrainian father, Morris Torchinsky, and an Estonian mother, Annie, at 27 Tottenham Court Road in St Pancras, London. He learned the rudiments of music quickly from his father, an orchestral trombonist, who used to sit next to fellow trombonist Gustav Holst in such places as the old Holborn Empire.

Torch studied piano at the Blackheath Conservatoire in south east London. His gift for memory came to his rescue when he entered an examination room and realised that he had left the compulsory music back at his home in Maida Vale. He thus had no choice but to play from memory; he passed with distinction. Following his studies, his first professional job was as accompanist to the violinist Albert Sandler. He worked as an accompanist before getting a job playing the piano with the Orchestra of the Regal Cinema, Marble Arch, London.

When the cinema's Christie Theatre Organ was installed in 1928, Torch became the Assistant Organist to the Chief Organist, Quentin Maclean. Torch took over as Chief Organist at the Cinema in 1932. Maclean had left in 1930 to become Chief Organist of the Trocadero Cinema, Elephant and Castle and was followed at the Regal until 1932 by Reginald Foort. Torch's tenure at the Regal lasted until 1934. His signature tune became "I've Got To Sing a Torch Song" (from the film Gold Diggers of 1933), which had his own special lyrics added.

Torch then played the organ in a number of London cinemas (amongst others, the Regal, Edmonton) and in 1937 he became the Chief Organist of the new Gaumont State Cinema, Kilburn. He continued to play the Wurlitzer there up until 1940, when he was drafted into the RAF and stationed near Blackpool. Torch would play and make recordings on the numerous cinema organs in the Blackpool area during his spare time. While in the RAF, he became the Conductor of the RAF Concert Orchestra, where he learned to arrange music and to conduct.

== Light music career ==
Following the end of the Second World War, Torch concluded that the heyday of the cinema organ was over. He thus made a new career in light orchestral music as a composer, conductor and arranger. It has been suggested that his wife Elizabeth Tyson, whom he married in 1949, may have influenced this decision, as she reportedly did not like the organ.

Starting in 1946, Torch composed and conducted a number of instrumentals with the Queen's Hall Light Orchestra for the Chappell catalogue, using his own name and the pseudonym 'Denis Rycoth' (an anagram of Sidney Torch). He was enlisted by the publishers Francis, Day & Hunter to conduct the New Century Orchestra in 1947, when their library was established, remaining with them until 1949, when a Musicians' Union ban stopped all work of this kind in Britain.

Torch conducted many orchestras and bands, particularly those of the BBC. Torch was the man who created the BBC Light Programme show Friday Night is Music Night, which began in 1953, and continues to be broadcast to this day (currently as 'Sunday Night is Music Night'). Torch also conducted the BBC Concert Orchestra for nearly every Friday Night show until his retirement in 1972. This came after a disagreement with the BBC: Torch snapped his baton in half at the end of his last concert.

Torch also composed many pieces for the BBC, particularly the theme tunes for radio and television shows. The theme of the radio show Much Binding In The Marsh is an example of this. Torch also composed independently, mostly pieces of light music. The piece "On A Spring Note" is considered to be one of Torch's best works: it is still regularly played and recorded by modern cinema organists. "Concerto Incognito" for piano and orchestra was written in the 1940s, in the style of Richard Addinsell's "Warsaw Concerto" and other "Denham Concertos" popular at the time in many British films. The three movement London Transport Suite, depicting hansom cab, omnibus and steam train, was written for a BBC Light Music Festival commission in 1957. "The Trapeze Waltz" (1963) became the theme tune for a series of French-themed plays, Maupassant, produced by Granada Television.

Torch made a huge number of recordings during his lifetime, some of them (including "Barwick Green", used as the theme from The Archers) produced by George Martin. Many of Torch's cinema organ recordings have been re-released on CD and can, therefore, still be bought today. A recording of Torch's "Off Beat Moods Part 1" was chosen by Stanley Kubrick as the theme for the fictitious BBC news programme "The World Tonight", seen aboard the spaceship Discovery in the film 2001: A Space Odyssey.

Torch had a reputation as a disciplinarian, according to the singers and musicians he conducted. One such performer described the "crackle" which came from starched shirt cuffs on his swift downbeats. It has been said that singers dreaded "the glare of the Torch" if they did not live up to his expectations. Despite this, his private generosity was also recalled by musicians who were in need of temporary financial help. Torch insisted upon smart attire from his musicians: he always had an extra pair of black socks or gloves kept on standby if required. According to David Ades of the Robert Farnon Society, Torch's music "was also often entertaining to watch as well as hear"; his "London Transport Suite" and "Duel for Drummers" being "ideal examples requiring, as they do, such athletic participation from the percussion section."

His personality was described by some of his choral singers and instrumentalists as "tyrannical"; in a 1983 he admitted to having been "cruel" when working with others. However, he also felt that the end results could have been positive, with those on the receiving end having benefited from this treatment.

== Personal life and death ==
In 1949, Torch married Eva Elizabeth Tyson (known as Elizabeth), a BBC producer. He retired from full-time conducting with the BBC in 1972 and was appointed an MBE in 1985. He and his wife lived in a flat in Eastbourne, Sussex, with a grand piano which he reportedly never played. He appeared to lose interest in music, and gave his records away to friends. Despite this, Torch and his wife were reportedly happy in retirement. She predeceased him, dying on 1 March 1990. Torch's health was worsening, and, according to one biographer, he became "increasingly depressed". On 16 July 1990, he took an overdose, "leaving warm, apologetic and explanatory notes to two good friends". One of these was his doctor, who was on holiday at the time. He died aged 82, with The Times commenting in their obituary that "he leaves a legacy to treasure".

== Bibliography ==
- Bierley, Paul E.; Rehrig, William H. The Heritage Encyclopedia of Band Music. Composers and their Music, Integrity Press, 1991.
- Larkin, Colin. The Encyclopedia of Popular Music, 5th edition, Macmillan, 1998, ISBN 978-1846098567
- Rust, Brian; Forbes, Sandy. British Dance Bands on Record 1911 to 1945, General Gramophone Publications, 1987, ISBN 978-0902470156
- Upton, Stuart. Sidney Torch (1908-1990), Vintage Light Music, Winter, 1991.

== Selected discography ==
- Sidney Torch at the Theatre Organ 1932-39, Doric compilation, 1973
- Music From Across The Sea, Coral LP, 1955
- Sidney Torch Orchestral Works, Marco Polo, 1997, reissued as Naxos 8.223443 in 2006 (original compositions)
- All Strings and Fancy Free: The Music of Sidney Torch and his Orchestra, Living Era compilation, 2004
- Sidney Torch Historic Recordings, EMI compilation, 2009
