= Sandy MacPherson =

Canadian-born theatre organist (1897–1975)

- Born: Roderick Hallowell MacPherson; 3 March 1897; Paris, Ontario, Canada
- Died: 3 March 1975 (aged 78) Ealing, Middlesex, England
- Occupation: Organist
- Instrument: Theatre organ

Roderick Hallowell "Sandy" MacPherson (3 March 1897 – 3 March 1975) was a Canadian-born theatre organist in Britain. As the second official BBC Theatre Organist, in succession to Reginald Foort, he achieved considerable broadcasting time during and after World War II.

== Early life and career ==
MacPherson was born in Paris, Ontario, Canada. He worked in the United States before travelling to England with his wife in 1928.

From 1928 to 1938 MacPherson was the resident organist at the Empire, Leicester Square. He was appointed BBC Theatre Organist in 1938, in succession to Reginald Foort, the first holder of that position. During the war years, MacPherson instituted parents speaking to their evacuee children in America live on the radio. He ran a number of request programmes, such as From My Postbag, At Your Request, and on a Sunday evening, The Twilight Hour. He also put out programmes with other artistes, for instance, Robinson Cleaver and his wife Molly (who played organ and grand piano), Stéphane Grappelli, Oscar Grasso, Gladys Ripley and Isobel Baillie. He also auditioned a young Julie Andrews.

== During the Second World War ==
When the BBC briefly switched to broadcasting only light music in September 1939, MacPherson played up to twelve hours per day, also filling in with announcements and programme-notes whilst the organisation hastily evacuated its staff from London to various locations around the British Isles. Pressure from listeners and the press, who quickly tired of this seemingly unending diet of theatre organ day after day, soon caused the BBC to resume broadcasting a wider range of music. In the dark days of late 1939 - early 1940, MacPherson's original signature tune, "Happy Days Are Here Again" was decidedly inappropriate to the times and he replaced it with his own composition, "I'll Play To You", a slow waltz which he used throughout the rest of his career (written with Harry S Pepper, a BBC producer). He played the opening music to the radio programme called London After Dark, on the theatre organ in St. George's Hall, London, broadcast 24 August 1940. In 1942, his habits of playing on the theatre organ and tiring the British public were mocked by Tommy Handley in an episode of It's That Man Again, in which Handley said: "You'll see many a worse 'un Sandy MacPherson!"

Initially during the war MacPherson regularly broadcast on the BBC from the BBC Theatre Organ (a 4-manual 23-rank Compton) in St. George's Hall until that instrument was destroyed in the blitz on 10 May 1941. MacPherson himself was then evacuated and continued to broadcast on a Hammond organ until Reginald Foort lent the BBC his travelling Moller pipe-organ, which was installed in Bangor, Wales, close to Macpherson's then home of Llandudno. At the end of the war, the BBC purchased the Moller from Foort and moved it to the Jubilee Chapel, Hoxton, East London, where it remained until 1963.

== Post-war ==
In the early 1950s, he was best known for his regular programme of light-religious music, The Chapel in the Valley. MacPherson introduced the programme, whilst "Mr Drewett" played the organ. "Mr Drewett" was actually Charles Drewett Smart, another theatre organist from the early days. MacPherson also had a request programme running at the same time which concentrated on slightly lighter music and was very popular with the older generation. After the war, MacPherson also periodically gave recitals on parish church organs in England and Wales. He retired from the position of BBC Theatre Organist in 1963, and the BBC sold the 5-manual 27-rank Moller organ, it being assumed that the days of theatre organ music were over, with audience numbers for this genre fast declining. The instrument is now installed in the Pasadena Civic Auditorium, having spent periods in Hilversum, Holland, and in a pizza parlour in San Diego, California, US. After retirement, MacPherson continued to broadcast from time to time, usually on the 4-manual 16-rank Wurlitzer in the Gaumont State Cinema, Kilburn, North London.

His biography, Sandy Presents, was published in 1950. He was the subject of This Is Your Life in November 1961, when he was surprised by Eamonn Andrews.

== Death ==
He died in Ealing, Middlesex, on his 78th birthday, 3 March 1975.

== Sources ==
- MacPherson's published autobiography
- The Longest Tour, BBC Radio 3, September 2006
- Untitled
- BBC - North West Wales History - Vernon Jones
- Widner, James F. Radio Days. Radio Days - London After Dark. 12 April 2011.
- About Aberdeen Theatre Organ Trust
