= BBC Theatre Organ =

Theatre organ used for radio programmes

The BBC Theatre Organ has existed in various guises and locations since 1933, used for in-house, often live broadcasts of organ music from the British Broadcasting Corporation. In theatre organ circles there are just three "official" BBC Theatre Organs: the St George's Hall Compton, Foort's Travelling Moller replacement, and the Manchester Wurlitzer.

== BBC Radio Theatre ==
The first organ broadcasts in Britain were given by 2LO in the 1920s with recitals from London's Steinway Hall in Marylebone Lane. The earliest BBC organ programmes were relayed from the Shepherd's Bush Pavilion and the New Gallery Kinema at 121 Regent Street. The popularity of these programmes and the need for access during late hour live broadcasts led the BBC to install its own instruments. The BBC's first in-house organ - a Compton organ - was unveiled at the BBC Radio Theatre (then named The Concert Hall) within Broadcasting House on 16 June 1933. To celebrate the event, the corporation broadcast a concert with George Thalben-Ball, G. D. Cunningham, and Walter Alcock. The organ featured 2,826 pipes in 35 ranks. However it wasn't used extensively due to the problem of sound leakage to other broadcasting studios, which were in constant use.

== St George's Hall ==
In 1933 the BBC acquired St. George's Hall, a theatre in Langham Place opposite Broadcasting House, for broadcasts of vaudeville, comedy and revue shows. In 1936 the first large scale theatre organ in the country to be specially designed and built exclusively for broadcasting - typically regarded as the original BBC Theatre Organ - was installed. It was another Compton - specifically a four manual Compton Melotone and Electrostatic Organ with 23 units, capable of producing a wider range of sounds during performances. In 1936 Reginald Foort was appointed resident organist, and the organ was first used in a broadcast on 20 October 1936, played by Foort and three other well-known organists of the day: Quentin Maclean, Reginald Porter-Brown and Harold Ramsay.

From 1936 the BBC Theatre Organ was used for frequent broadcasts by many organists, including Fredric Bayco, Dudley Beaven (who used it for the first episode of Music While You Work in June 1940), Harold Robinson Cleaver, Frederic Curzon, Florence De Jong, Reginald Dixon, Reginald New, George Pattman, Dudley Savage, Donald Thorne, and Sidney Torch. As staff organist Foort performed in the vast majority of broadcasts, followed by, though overlapping with, his eventual successor Sandy MacPherson from July 1937. In the first two years Foort gave over 400 solo broadcasts and introduced 72 guest organists to the BBC Theatre Organ. When the BBC briefly switched to broadcasting only light music at the outbreak of war in September 1939, MacPherson played up to twelve hours per day whilst the organisation hastily evacuated its staff from London to various locations around the British Isles.

== Foort's Travelling Moller ==
St George's Hall and the organ sustained extensive bomb damage from air raids in September 1940, May 1941 and March 1943, and the BBC studios were moved to the Aeolian Hall in New Bond Street. To replace the organ, Foort offered to loan the BBC his "Travelling Moller", a large scale organ designed to be moved for performances in different venues. It had been built by the Danish-American organ maker M. P. Moller to Foort's specifications. The instrument was initially installed in Bangor, Wales, close to Macpherson's house in Llandudno. In 1946 the BBC purchased the organ from Foort outright and installed it in the disused Jubilee Chapel, East Road in Hoxton (now demolished), where it remained for the next 18 years, until 1963. It was regularly used for 10am morning broadcasts, mostly by Sandy MacPherson. The organ was then sold to Netherlands Radio VARA for use at its studios in Hilversum.

== Maida Vale and Manchester ==
A three manual electronic organ was also commissioned in 1936 for the BBC's Maida Vale Studios, where it has remained in use until the present day. It was used there for BBC Symphony Orchestra rehearsals where an organ was required. But in the late 1960s the BBC acquired its third "official" BBC Theatre Organ: a Wurlitzer from the Empress Ballroom Blackpool, enabling Reginald Dixon to continue broadcasting after his retirement from the Tower Ballroom in 1969. It was installed at the BBC Playhouse studios in Manchester until the studios closed in 1986. The organ was introduced on 12 November 1970 as a gala performance edition of The Organist Entertains by Robin Richmond, with performances by Ernest Broadbent, Reginald Dixon and Reginald Porter Brown.

Latter day broadcasts in the 1970s and 1980s by Reginald Dixon, Nigel Ogden, Robin Richmond, Dudley Savage and others were broadcast from Manchester. The final time an organist was billed as playing "at the console of The BBC Theatre Organ" on air was on 14 July 1990. The organist was Harold Robinson Cleaver, in a programme recorded before his death three years earlier.
