= Reginald Foort =

British theatre organist (1893–1980)

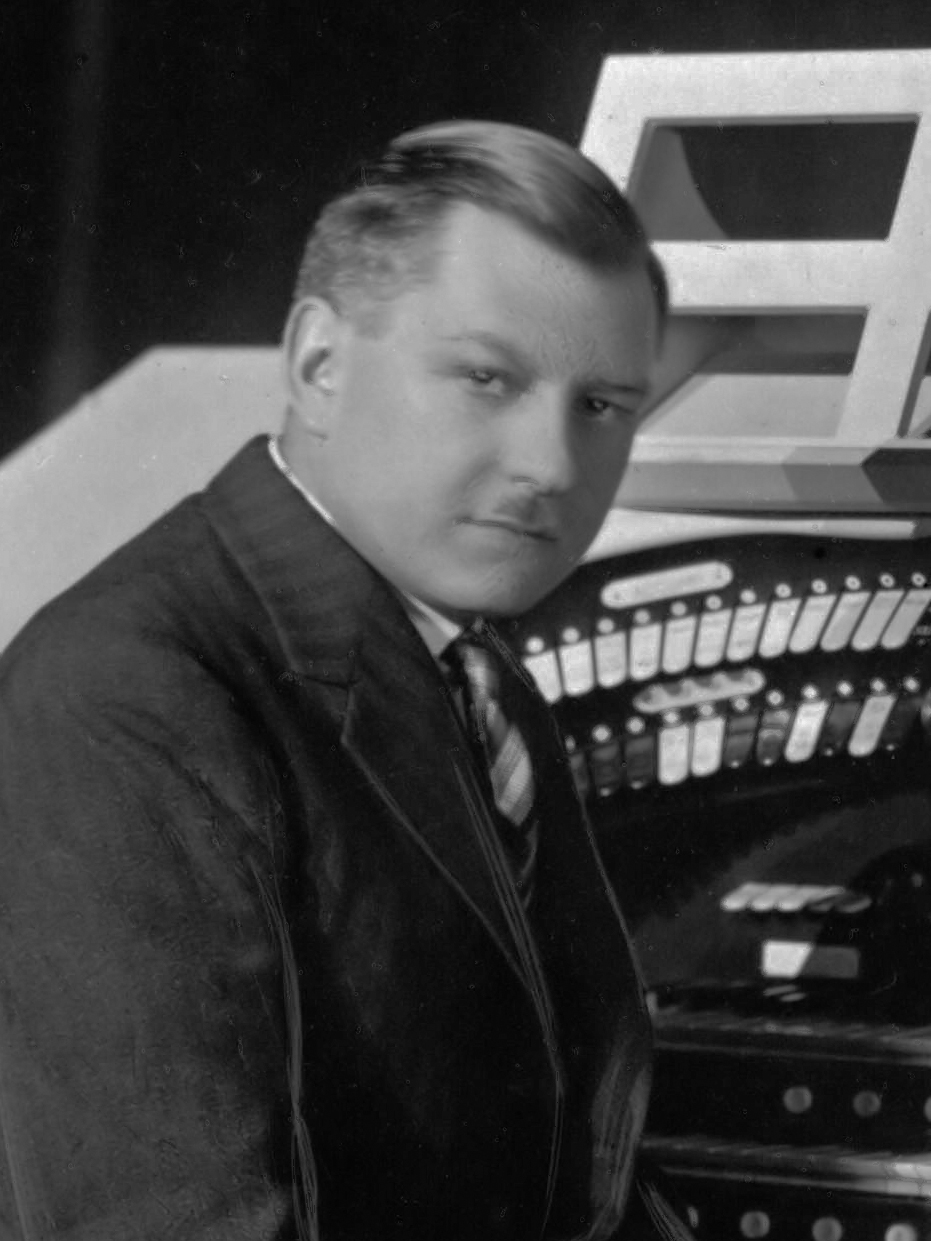
- Foort in 1932

Background information
- Born: 21 January 1893; Daventry, England
- Died: 22 May 1980 (aged 87) Pinellas, Florida, United States
- Occupation: Organist
- Instrument: Cinema organ/theatre organ

Reginald John Foort (21 January 1893 – 22 May 1980) was a cinema organist. He was the first official BBC Staff Theatre Organist from 1936 to 1938, during which time he made 405 broadcasts on the organ at St George's Hall, Langham Place. He was a popular broadcaster in his heyday in the late 1930s and 1940s in Britain, and later settled in the United States, where he also enjoyed a career of performing and recording.

== Biography ==
Foort was born in Daventry, England, on 21 January 1893. His father was a church organist (leading Foort to joke later that he was 'born an organist'). Foort learnt the piano from the age of seven and took up the organ at eleven after his family moved to Rugby, studying with Basil Johnson, Master of Music at Rugby School. Foort became both an Associate and a Fellow of the Royal College of Organists (FRCO) by the age of only 17 under the tutelage of Sir Walter Parratt and began his career as organist and choirmaster at St Mary's, Bryanston Square, London. Having served in the Royal Navy during World War I, during which he served in the Battle of Jutland, he worked as a piano accompanist for silent films in the 1920s, from which it was a natural progression to become a cinema organist.

=== Career in Britain and Europe ===
Foort's first performance on a Wurlitzer was at a theatre in Edinburgh, and a few weeks later he took up a job as organist at the New Gallery Kinema, Regent Street, London, where in the late 1920s he passed what he described as 'one of the happiest periods of my life', popularising the theatre organ as a 'one-man orchestra' through broadcasts and recordings of his performances on the cinema's F2/S Wurlitzer. This was followed by spells at the Paramount Theatre (Paris); the London Palladium, and, with Sandy MacPherson, the Empire, Leicester Square. He made his first commercial recording in 1926.

In 1930, Foort became solo organist at the Regal, Marble Arch, performing on a Christie organ. In 1932, he was appointed the first resident organist at the Regal, Kingston upon Thames, and advised on the installation of theatre organs in a number of regional cinemas in collaboration with the organ builder Peter Conacher of Huddersfield. During a visit to the US in 1935, he performed on the 4/36 organ at the Paramount Theatre in New York. Touring back home in Europe, he was warmly received at the Jerusalemkirk in Denmark owing to a popular following from his radio broadcasts. He did a five-month spell at the City Theatre, Amsterdam, and broadcast on the Dutch radio station Radio Hilversum, returning to London to take up a post as organist of the four-manual Compton organ at the Paramount Theatre, Tottenham Court Road.

In 1936, Foort was appointed as Staff Theatre Organist at the BBC, performing at the BBC Theatre Organ, St George's Hall, Langham Place, and attained widespread popularity, not only for his musicality but also for his personal charm. Each episode began and closed with his signature tune "Keep Smiling". In 1937, Foort was voted the most popular radio entertainer in Britain, with twice as many votes as Gracie Fields, beating his friend and fellow organist Reginald Dixon into third place. Foort remained in the role of Staff Theatre Organist until 1938, continuing to make broadcasts for the BBC on a freelance basis.

In 1938, Foort designed and commissioned a mobile organ from the American firm M. P. Möller, which was first set up at the Drury Lane Theatre, London in only five days, enabling him to make his first recording on it on the fifth day. During the next few years, he made a series of memorable recordings of classical and light music on the Möller. In 1941, he loaned the mobile organ to the BBC, and for the next ten years travelled round the country, often by train, giving performances. His warm and personable style, combined with his patriotism, were a boost to wartime morale, and he set himself a punishing schedule with the result that a decade later, in his words, "there was not a town or city anywhere in Great Britain that I had not visited".

=== Career in the United States ===
Having greatly enjoyed his 1935 visit to the US, when he played the organ of the Paramount Theatre in New York, Foort vowed to return to the States to live. The opportunity came in 1951, when he was invited to establish an American foothold for a Dutch firm, the Standaart Organ Company. He settled with his wife (Betty) and family in Suffolk, Virginia, in 1952. Foort made recordings on the Mosque Theatre organ in Richmond, Virginia, and used the pseudonym Michael Cheshire for his recordings of light music, which were not considered serious enough to fit with Standaart's reputation (he had also used this name previously in England under the Eclipse label). However, the Standaart project was discontinued after only ten months, owing to lack of capital.

Foort and his family chose to remain in the US. He was invited to work for the Chicago-based firm Baldwin Organs, a role that he retained for many years. Having resettled in Chicago, he enjoyed another active period of his career, including as organist for the Jewish Reform Temple (Temple Sholom), playing its horseshoe-shaped Wurlitzer. According to Foort's friend Ben M Hall, Foort could 'thrill huge audiences... with deft interpretations of serious classics, light classics, show tunes and pop tunes,' being 'the master of each genre'.

== Möller organ specification and history ==
Weighing 30 short tons (27 t), Foort's specially commissioned Möller organ had five manuals (keyboards), 27 ranks of pipes, 259 stops, over 100 pistons and controls, and percussion instruments. It was transported in sections, by a fleet of five lorries and thirteen staff; during World War II fuel rationing it was transported by train. During Foort's travels, from 1938 onwards, the organ was set up 167 times at 118 different locations. In 1941, Foort loaned the organ to the BBC after theirs was destroyed by German bombing. They subsequently purchased it in 1946, erecting it at the Jubilee Hall, London. In 1963, the BBC sold the organ to Radio Hilversum. From there, it went, in 1975, after a thorough refurbishment, to a pizza parlour in Pacific Beach, California, where Foort rededicated it. Since 1979 it has been installed at Pasadena Civic Auditorium, California, where Foort attended its 23 April 1980 inaugural performance. He died in Pinellas, Florida, less than a month later, on 22 May.

== Broadcasts and recordings ==
Foort made his first broadcast from Marconi House, playing the piano, on January 15, 1923. His most famous broadcasts and recordings in the UK were in 1936-8 on his Möller organ, as the BBC Staff Theatre Organist.

In 2004, Phoenix Historic Records was set up by William Henry Lewis (1924-2021) to bring his collection of Foort 78 records to a wider audience through digitally remastered CD editions. The featured melodies, medleys and excerpts are by a wide range of composers of classical and light music, including Addinsell, Amers, Bizet, Brahms, Chopin, Coates, Delibes, Donaldson, Drigo, Friml, Green, Handel, Hanley-Mills, Harline, Joyce, Kahn-Woods, Ketelby, Kilmer-Rasbach, Klein-Dillon, Nevin, Orth, Purcell, Rombert, Rossini, Schubert, Simons-Marks, Sullivan, Suppé, Taylor-Fisher, Tobias-DeRose, Toselli, Wagner, Haydn Wood, Yradier and Zalva. The CD titles are as follows:

- Reginald Foort at the organ of the Regal Cinema, Kingston-on-Thames (1932-33)
- Reginald Foort on his giant Möller concert organ (1938-42), volumes I-VI
- Reginald Foort on the Paramount Theatre Organ, New York

A special programme to mark Foort's departure from the BBC, Farewell to Reginald Foort, was broadcast on the BBC Home Service on 31 October 1938. He featured as a castaway on the BBC Radio 4 programme Desert Island Discs on 8 May 1971.

Foort made many recordings while in the US, in Virginia, Chicago, Pasadena (California) and other locations. He described his first LP, recorded at Boston Symphony Hall, as his finest recording (despite temperatures on the night having been around 100 °F (38 °C)).

== Bibliography ==
- —— (1932). The cinema organ (1 ed.). Pitman.
- —— (1970). The cinema organ: A description in non-technical language of a fascinating instrument and how it is played (2 ed.). Vestal Press. ISBN 978-0911572056.
