= Robert Bowman =

Robert Bowman (also Rob, Bob, or Bobby) may refer to:

== Sports ==
- Bob Bowman (coach) (born 1965), American swimming coach
- Rob Bowman (footballer) (born 1975), English football player
- Robert A. Bowman, President and CEO of MLB Advanced Media
- Bob Bowman (pitcher) (1910–1972), American baseball pitcher
- Bob Bowman (outfielder) (1930–2017), American baseball outfielder

== Music and entertainment ==
- Rob Bowman (director) (born 1960), American film and television director
- Rob Bowman (music writer) (born 1956), Canadian music writer and professor of ethnomusicology
- BooG!e (born Bobby Bowman), actor known for playing T-Bo in the American teen sitcom iCarly

== Other uses ==
- Robert M. Bowman (1934–2013), former Director of Advanced Space Programs Development for the U.S. Air Force and U.S. presidential candidate
- Robert M. Bowman Jr. (born 1957), American Christian theologian
- Robert Bowman (journalist) (fl. 1940s), Canadian radio reporter
- Robert Benson Bowman (1808–1882), Newcastle bookseller and entrepreneur
