= Broadway Theatre, Catford =

Theatre in Catford, London, England

Broadway, Catford
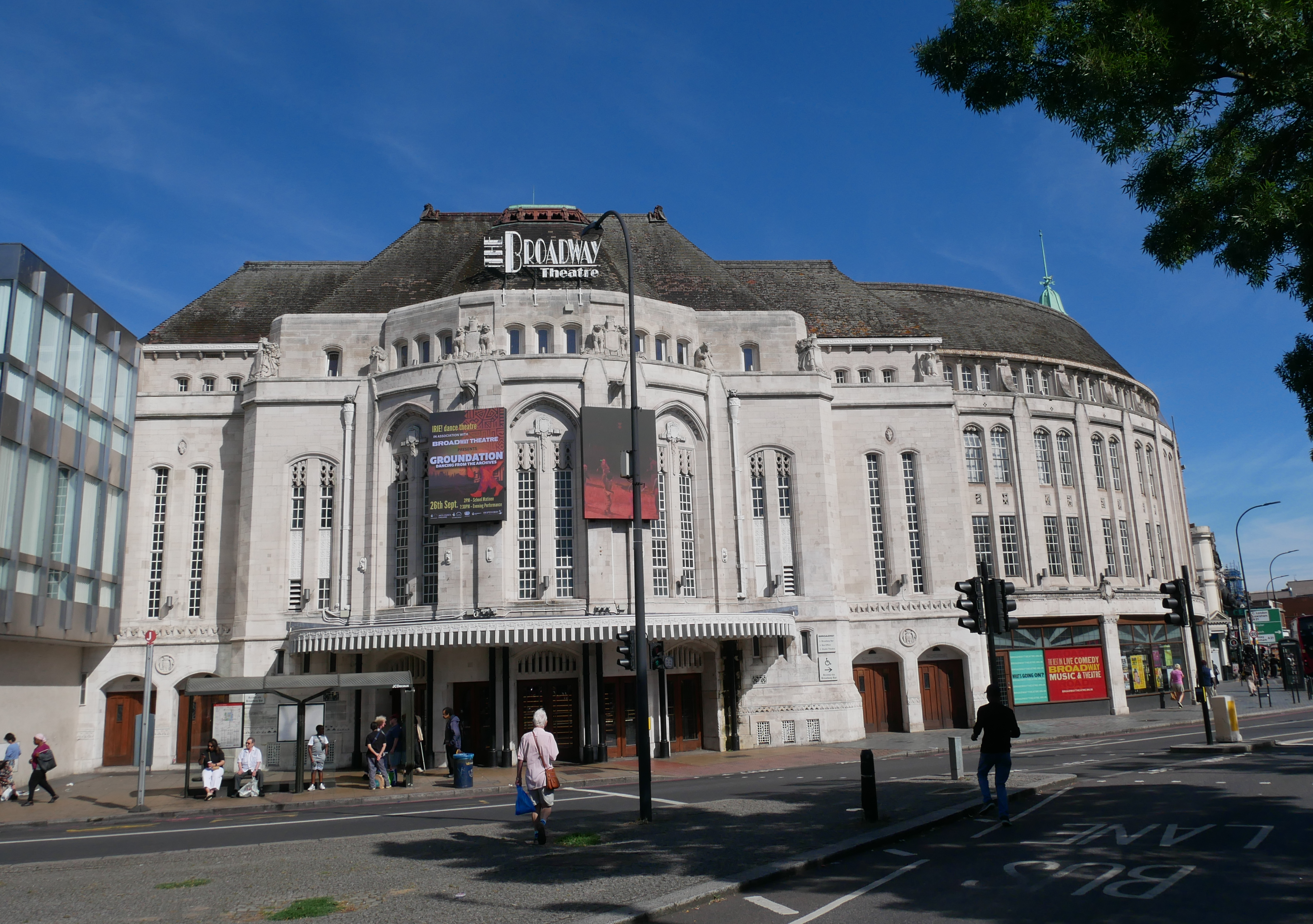
- Broadway, Catford
- Interactive map of Broadway, Catford
- Former names: Lewisham Theatre
- Address: Rushey Green; London, SE6; United Kingdom
- Coordinates: 51.4453°N 0.0205°W
- Owner: London Borough of Lewisham
- Capacity: 800 seated (main); 100 seated (studio theatre)
- Type: Receiving house
- Designation: Grade II listed
- Production: Cinema, theatre, music and pantomime
- Public transit: Catford Bridge

Construction
- Opened: 1932; 94 years ago
- Architect: Bradshaw Gass & Hope

Website
- broadwaytheatre.org.uk

The Broadway Theatre (formerly known as the Lewisham Theatre) is a theatre on Rushey Green, Catford, in the London Borough of Lewisham. A grade II listed building, the theatre was built in 1932 and is an example of Art Deco design. It has two auditoriums, an 800-seat main theatre and a small 80-seat studio theatre. The theatre's programme consists of a diverse mix of theatre and music, including stand up comedy, nostalgia shows, pantomime, drama and children's theatre.

== History ==
The architects of the building were Bradshaw Gass & Hope; the slightly Gothic features were intended to relate to the adjacent Gothic style vestry hall which has since been demolished. The theatre was originally a concert hall, built as part of the town hall extension, which was officially opened by the Duke of York on 22 June 1932. A pipe organ made by John Compton with three manuals was installed at the time the concert hall opened.

== Main theatre ==
The Broadway Theatre is particularly noted for presenting a wide range of black theatre.

== Broadway Studio ==
The Broadway's Studio Theatre runs a continuous programme of productions featuring professional actors and directors. Since 2001's production of Ben Elton's Popcorn the studio has hosted numerous productions including Cabaret, Trainspotting, A Clockwork Orange and their critically acclaimed take on Frank McGuinness's Someone Who'll Watch Over Me.

== Compton Organ ==
The organ was built by the John Compton Organ Company and installed in June 1932 as part of the original Lewisham Town Hall Theatre opening by the future King George VI, who was then Duke of York. A demonstration of the organ was given by famous organist Reginald New. The organ was brought back into working condition in 2005.
