= Reginald New =

UK theatre organist (1902–1958)

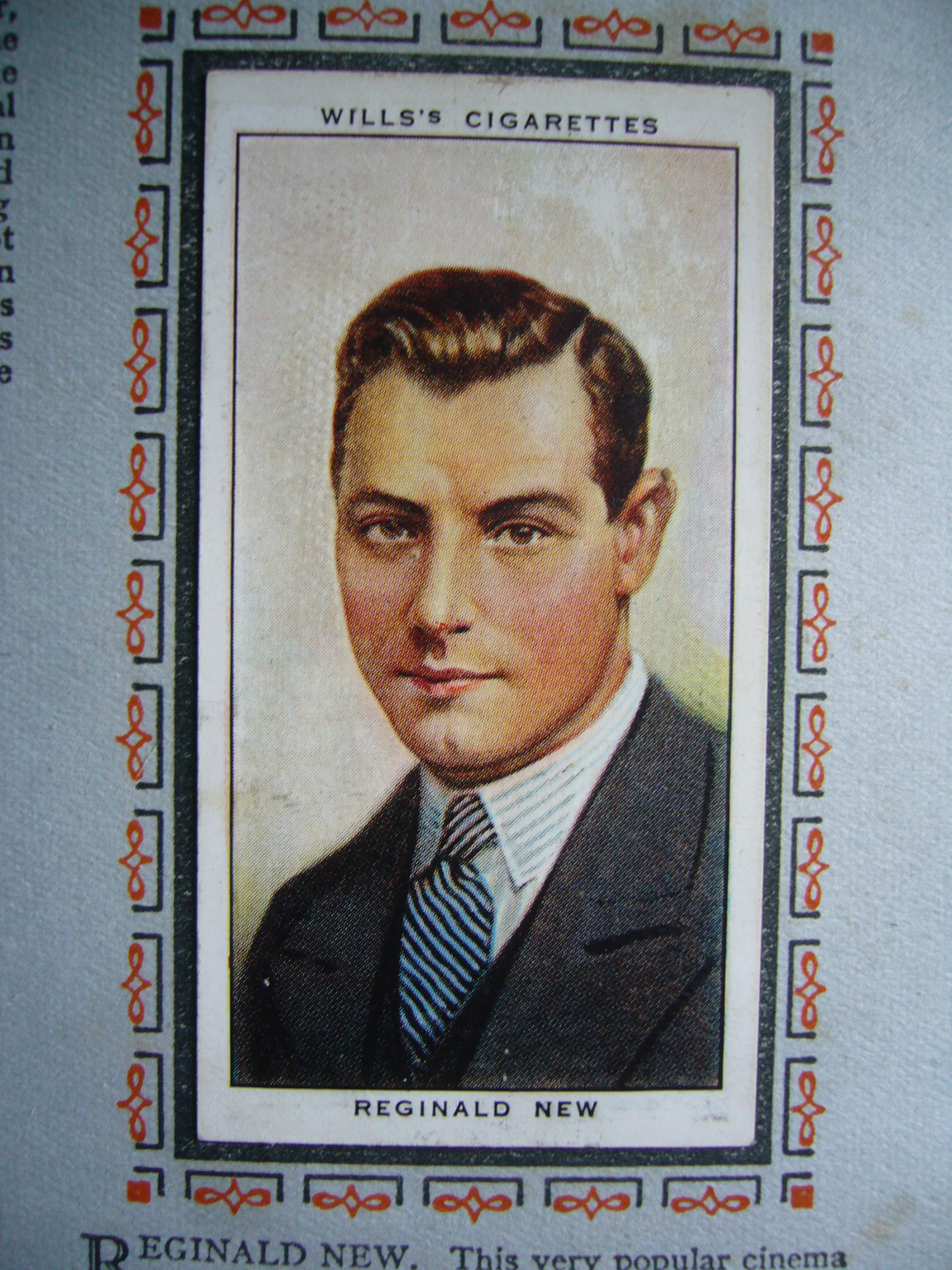

Reginald New (April 1902, in Lewisham, Kent – 28 November 1958, in Beckenham, Kent) was a popular UK theatre organist whose career spanned the 1920s through to the 1950s.

== Career ==
New was first a chorister and then assistant organist at St George's, Catford later organist at Christ's Church, Chislehurst before he became a cinema organist. When cinemas started using organists to accompany silent pictures, New was among the pioneers at various London cinemas in 1920. On 28 November 1929 he made his first BBC radio broadcast from the Beaufort Cinema, Washwood Heath, Birmingham. After broadcasting 468 times, he transferred to the Regal Cinema at Kingston-on-Thames in 1933 making another 200 broadcasts from there.

In 1932, New attended the opening of the Broadway Theatre, Catford, Lewisham alongside the then Duke of York and future King George VI. New did a demonstration on the Broadway Theatre Compton organ.

He often gave concerts on the Cheltenham Town Hall organ and broadcast from there on 8 December 1935. In August 1940 he was appointed organist of the Regal Cinema, Beckenham. New was unique in that he used two signature tunes - signing in with "Jolly Good Company" and signing out with "Old Father Thames". During his time at Dartford, he composed the "Dartford March". This became a soldiers' marching tune and was sung by many who came back from Dunkirk. Reginald New made over 800 broadcasts in his career.
