= Shirebrook =

Town in Derbyshire, England

Coordinates: 53.2048°N 1.2197°W

- Town and civil parish
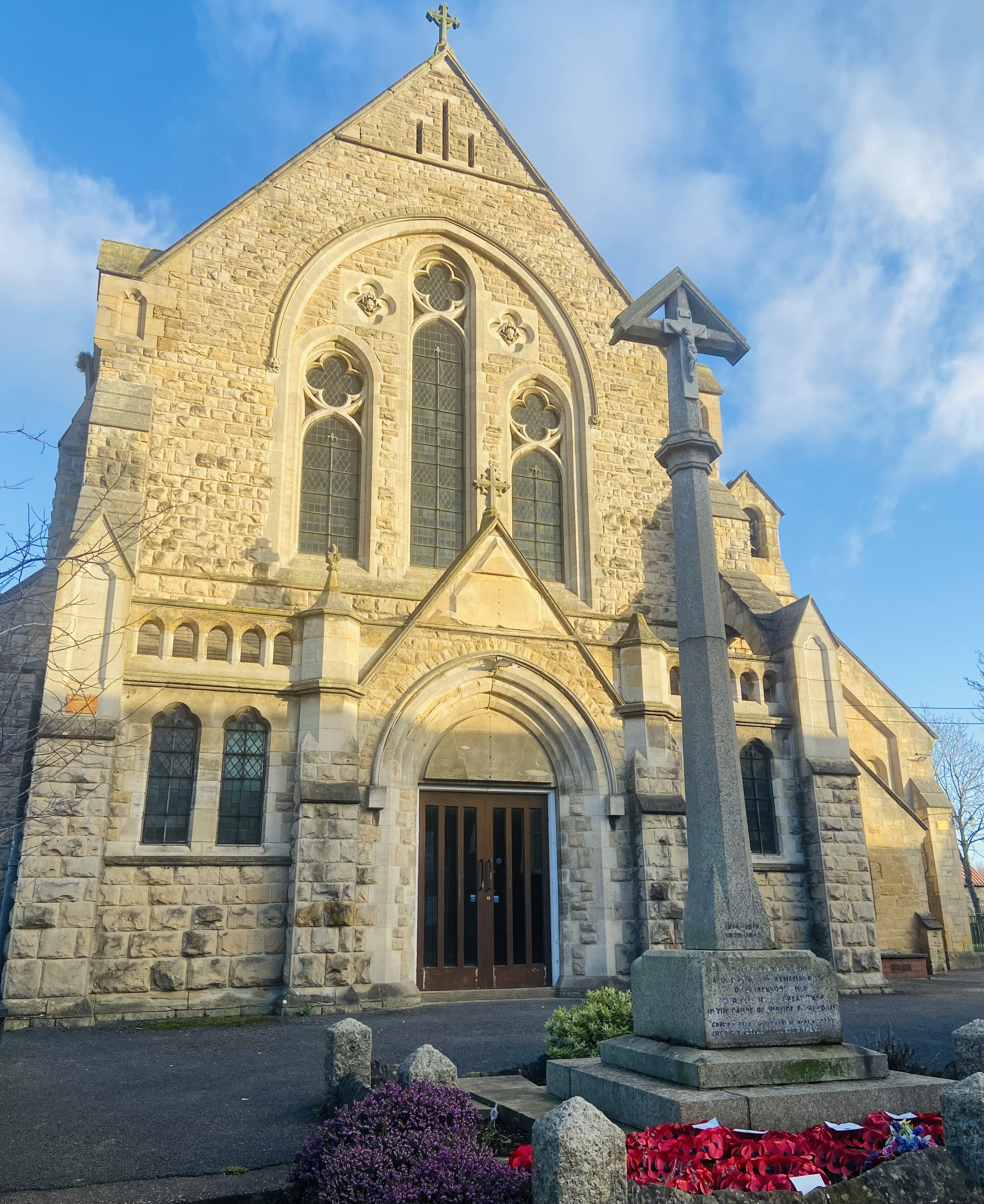
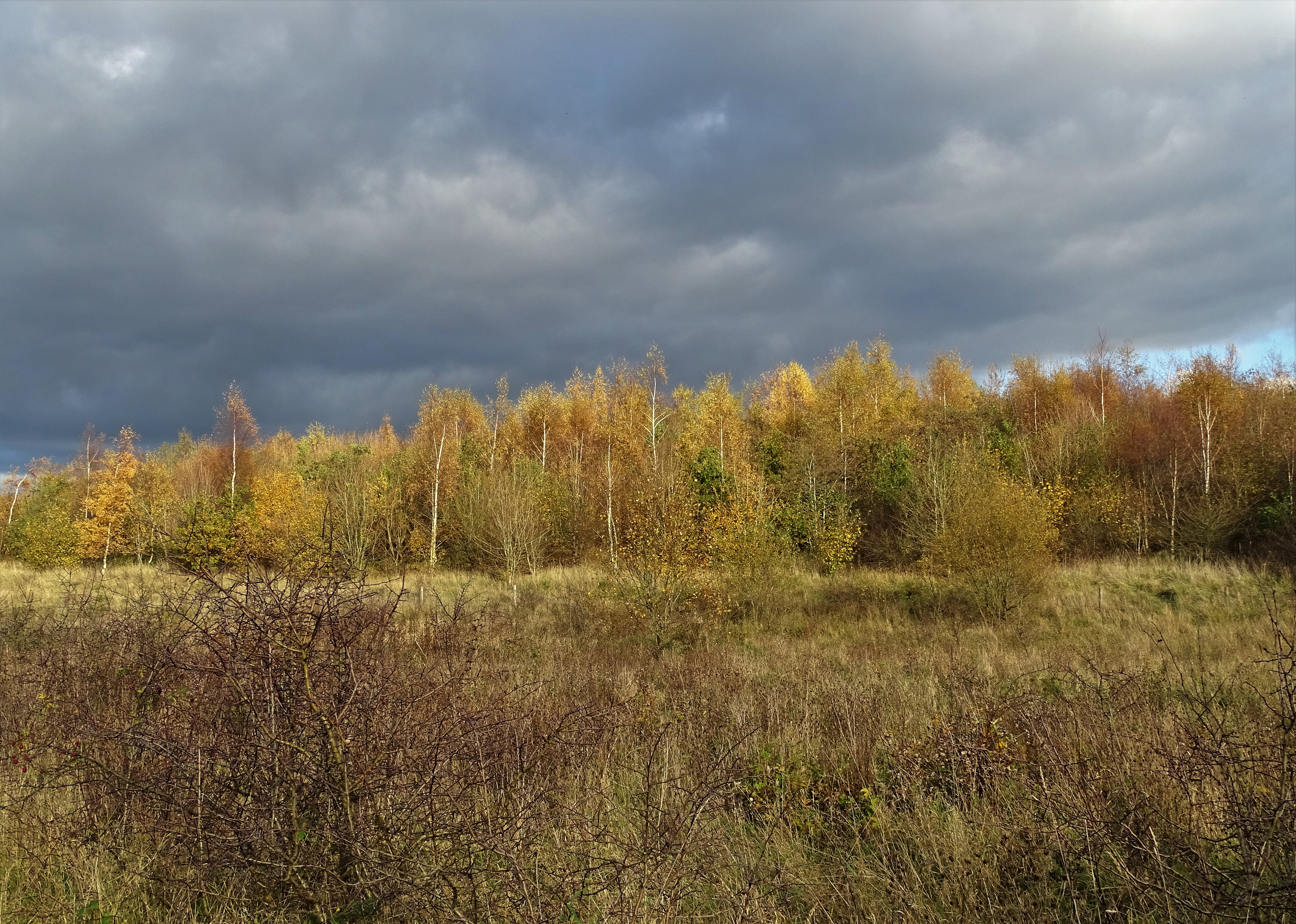
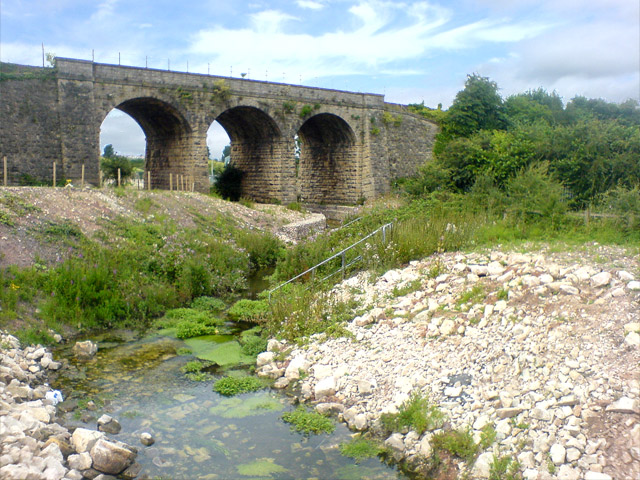
- Holy Trinity Parish Church Shirebrook Woods Viaduct

- Location within Derbyshire
- Interactive map of Shirebrook
- Population: 13,300 (civil parish)
- OS grid reference: SK522678
- District: Bolsover
- Shire county: Derbyshire
- Region: East Midlands
- Country: England
- Sovereign state: United Kingdom
- Post town: Mansfield
- Postcode district: NG20
- Dialling code: 01623
- Police: Derbyshire
- Fire: Derbyshire
- Ambulance: East Midlands
- UK Parliament: Bolsover
- Website: shirebrooktowncouncil.gov.uk

Shirebrook is a town and civil parish in the Bolsover District of Derbyshire, England. It had a population of 13,300 at the 2021 Census. The town is on the B6407 road and close to the A632 road which runs between the towns of Mansfield, Worksop and Bolsover. The town is close to the Bassetlaw and Mansfield Districts of Nottinghamshire.

== Toponymy ==
According to David Mills in A Dictionary of British Place-Names, the area was first named in records in 1202 written in Old English as Scirebroc. This can be interpreted as Boundary or Bright Brook.

== History ==
Prior to the intense and swift development of the Colliery at the turn of the 20th century, Shirebrook, even as late as 1872 it was little more than a chapelry of the larger Pleasley. Wilsons' Imperial Gazetteer of England and Wales of 1870–72 describes "SHIREBROOK, a chapelry in Pleaseley parish, Derby; 3¾ miles NNW of Mansfield r. station. It was constituted in 1849, and it has a post-office under Mansfield. Pop., 342. Houses, 70. The living is a vicarage in the diocese of Lichfield. Value, £90.* Patron, the Rector of Pleaseley. The church was built in 1843."

=== Industrial Revolution ===
Shirebrook Colliery was sunk in 1896–1897 by the Shirebrook Coal and Iron company on land owned by the Duke of Devonshire, Joseph Paget (a Pleasley Mills partner and the builder of Stuffynwood Hall), and the Nicholson and Fowler farming families. Professor Arnold Lupton of Sheffield was the mining engineer. The sinking of two shafts, plus a pumping shaft, was based on independent surveys by Henry Hall and Matthew Fisher, managers of working collieries. The shafts, 19 feet (5.8 m) wide, met the 'Top Hard' seam at 430 yards (390 m).

By 1897, a 'model village' was already being built close to the colliery to house workers. The Derbyshire Times of 30 July 1897 reported that "About half a mile away a model village is springing up, some 150 houses have already been erected and about 420 are to be built."

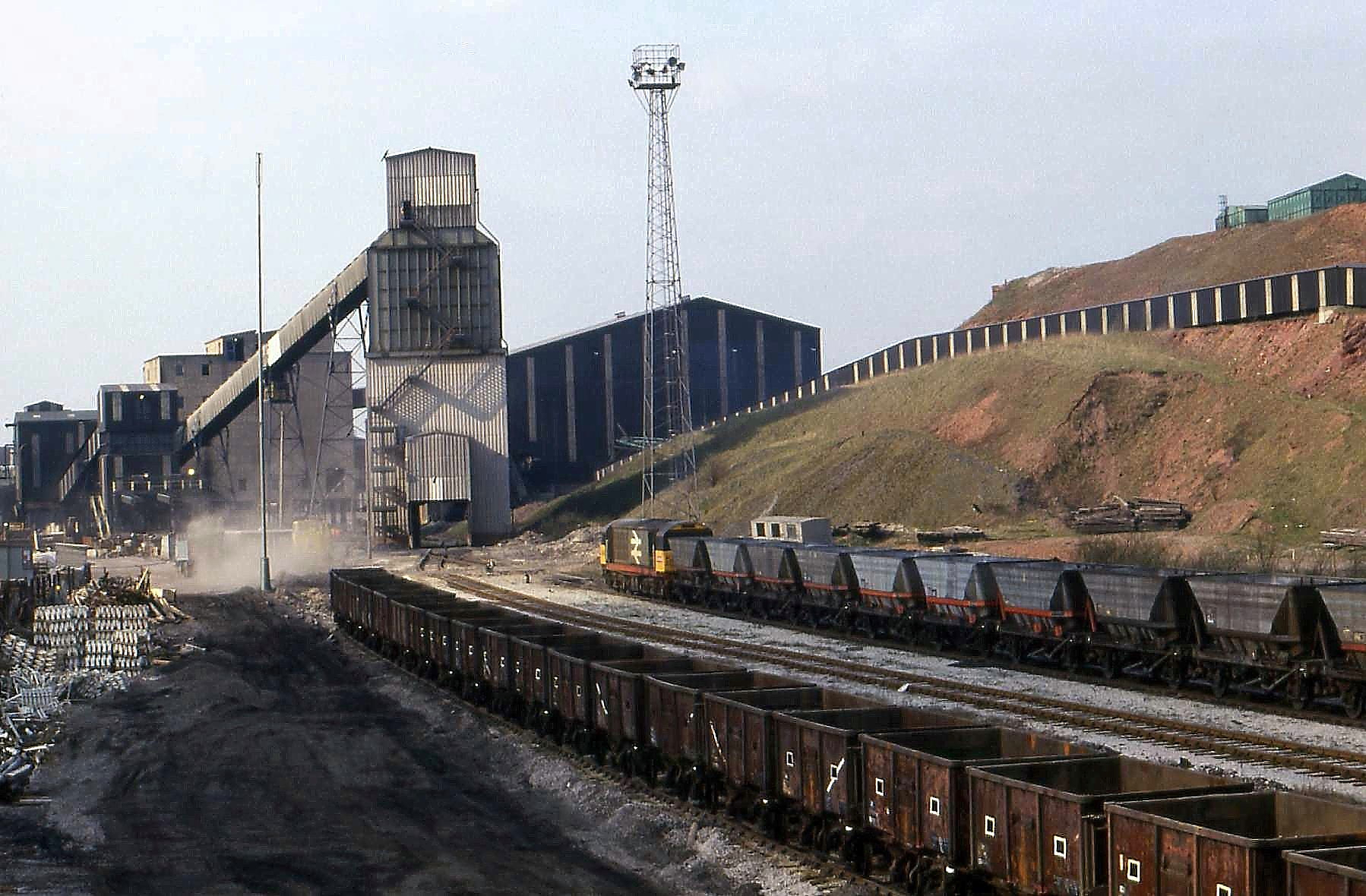
Former Shirebrook Colliery

Shirebrook Colliery operated in the town until April 1993. It had previously been linked underground to nearby Pleasley Colliery. The workforce was about evenly split during the strike of 1984–85, leading to deep community divisions between strikers and workers, and briefly earned the nickname "the Belfast of England".

== Economy ==
=== Regeneration ===
Shirebrook is going through a period of transformation like other towns close by. The market place in Shirebrook is being improved – including resurfacing the marketplace, building a new Town Council building, introducing themed markets such as craft, arts and flea markets – at a cost of £15 million.

=== Housing ===
As part of the government's Levelling Up initiative, a plan to create affordable homes on part of the former colliery site has seen the First Homes pilot scheme established to allow local first-time buyers and key workers to buy new builds at a 30% discount of the market price.

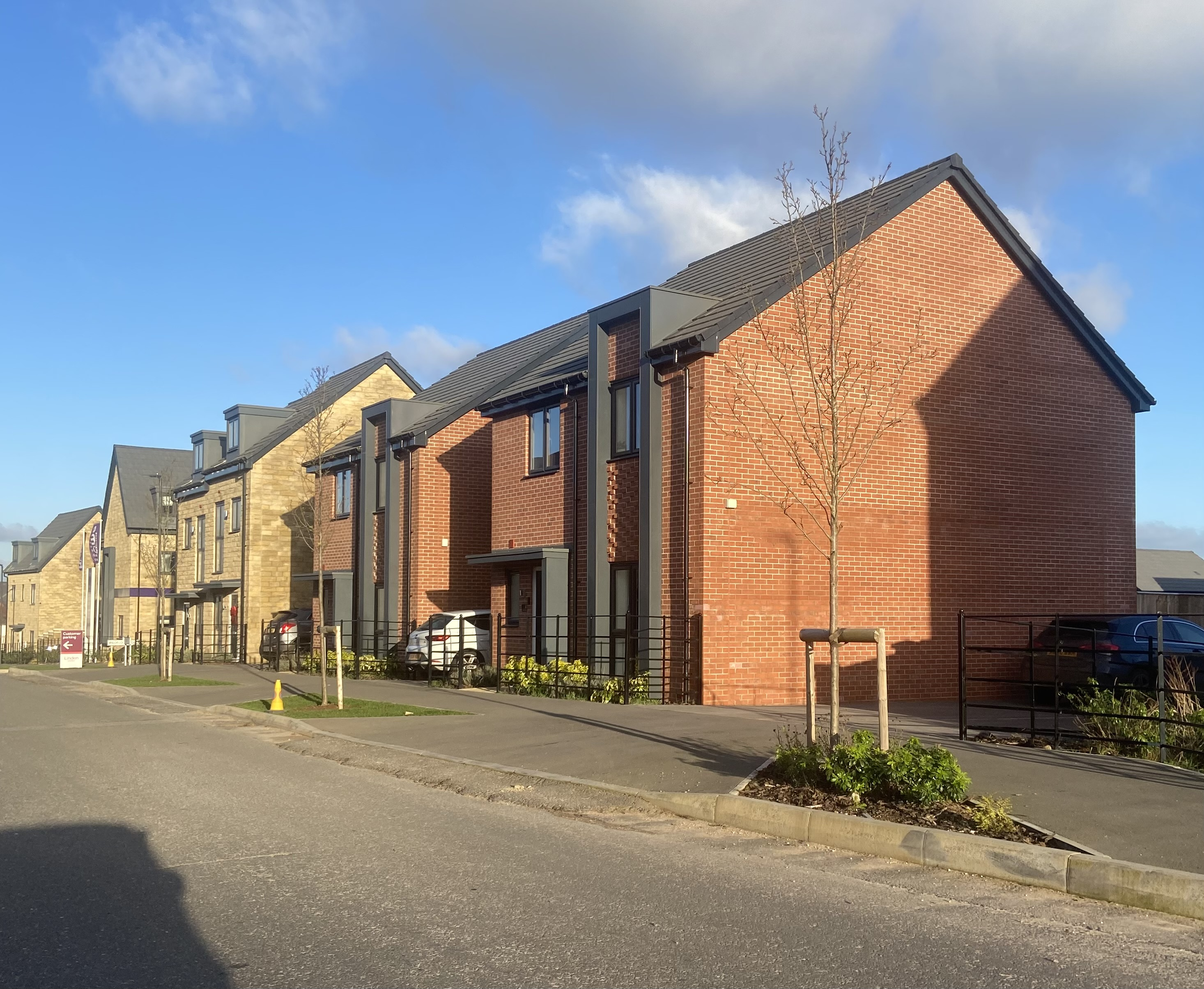
Caraway Drive

=== Sports Direct hub ===
Re-titled as Brook Park, half of the entire business park designated as Zone 1 was allocated to Sports Direct after a planning application to Bolsover District Council in 2004 for four giant warehouses totalling 111,000 square metres, with a training facility, helipad and a retail store.

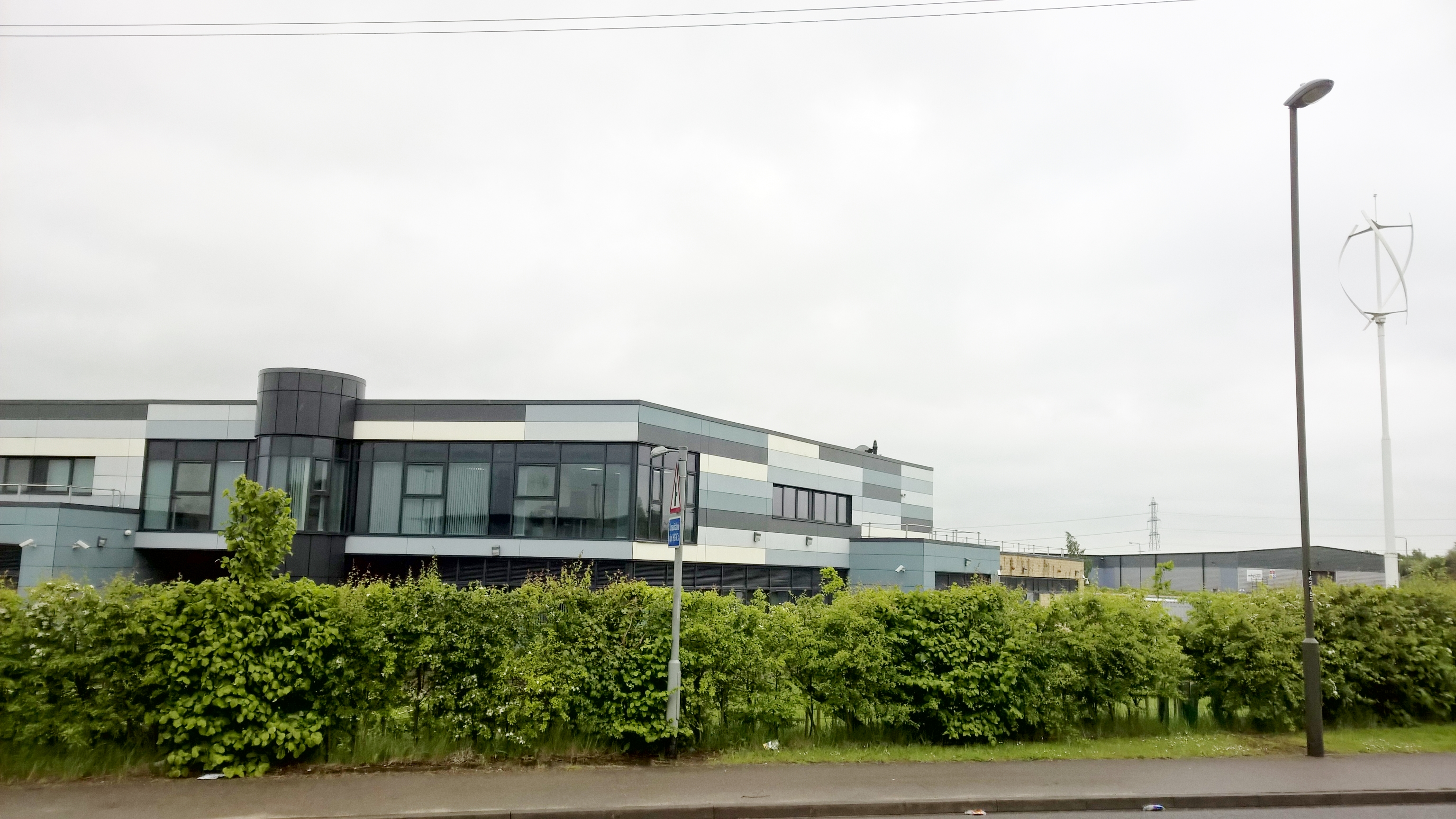
Sports Direct Offices

=== Community building ===
In December 2017, the government through their Minister for Faith and Communities, Lord Bourne, announced a £1.26 million aid-package from the Controlling Migration Fund, after a bid from local networking groups Bolsover Partnership and Shirebrook Forward NG20 due to the large influx of Eastern European workers.

The money is a two-year investment intended to improve access to public services, stage community events, improve the shopping and Market Square area and ease pressures on housing, schooling and health services resulting from recent migration.

The project named Building Resilience will see investment into seven core areas:

- Community resilience
- Market Square Enlivenment
- Migrant community access
- Improve access and quality of private sector housing
- Social Norms and UK Laws
- Additional GP resources
- Healthy Workforce Programme

Shirebrook Town Hall was constructed as a new build on the site of a former storage unit on the market square. It opened in 2019 as a 'one stop shop' with customer contact centre and payment counter at ground floor level, and offices for Town Council and Bolsover District business above. The council's claim is "...we believe it to be one of the largest, if not the largest town centre square in England".

In addition to two ongoing fabrication-engineering businesses at nearby Langwith, Shirebrook has a large furniture retailer.

== Education ==
Shirebrook Academy on Common Lane is the local secondary school for pupils aged 11–16.

Shirebrook also has many primary schools and nurseries such as:

- Park Infant & Nursery Schools
- Park Junior School
- Stubbin Wood Special School
- Brookfield Primary School

== Media ==
Local TV coverage is provided by BBC Yorkshire and Lincolnshire and BBC East Midlands on BBC One and by ITV Yorkshire and ITV Central on ITV1. Television signals are received from either the Belmont or Waltham TV transmitters.

The town is served by both BBC Radio Sheffield on 94.7 FM and BBC Radio Nottingham on 95.5 FM. Other radio stations including Capital East Midlands on 96.5 FM, Mansfield 103.2 FM, Greatest Hits Radio North Derbyshire on 107.4 FM and online community radio station Elastic FM.

The town is served by the local newspapers the Mansfield and Ashfield Chad and the Derbyshire Times.

== Railway ==
Shirebrook once had three railway stations. The last remaining station was on the Midland Railway (later part of the LMS) route from Nottingham to Worksop via Mansfield, and was originally known as Shirebrook West, despite being on the eastern edge of the town. The route lost its passenger services in October 1964, leaving Shirebrook without a station, but the line remained open as a goods route. On the site of the goods yard a diesel locomotive fuelling depot was opened in the mid-1960s. The station was re-opened in 1998 as Shirebrook railway station for the new Robin Hood Line services from Nottingham to Worksop via Mansfield. A wagon repair and manufacturing business have a rail link with the main line.

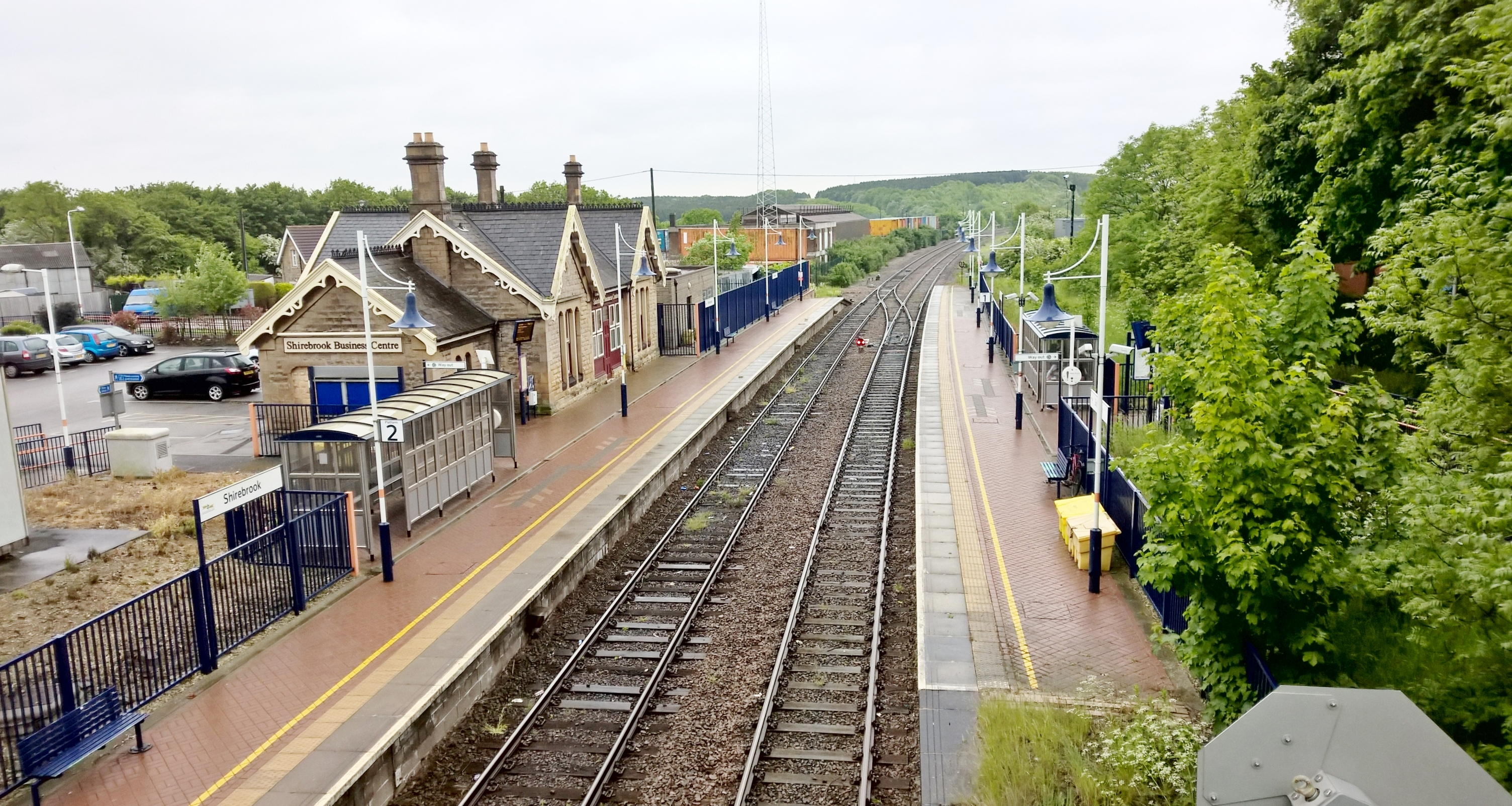
Shirebrook Railway Station

Shirebrook North station (originally known as "Langwith Junction", until renamed in June 1924), was opened by the Lancashire, Derbyshire and East Coast Railway (later part of the Great Central Railway and subsequently the London & North Eastern Railway) in March 1897 and closed in September 1955. By then only one of the four routes converging on it was left- that to Lincoln: the Great Northern Railway's "Leen Valley Extension" line to Pleasley and Sutton-in-Ashfield had closed in September 1931; the LD&ECR line to Beighton via Clowne in September 1939, and that to Chesterfield via Bolsover in December 1951, due to the unsafe condition of Bolsover Tunnel. The filling in of the tunnel began on 10 October 1966, and used waste from Bolsover Colliery. The mouth of the old tunnel can be found on the southern edge of Scarcliffe, emerging just south of Ridgdale Road, Bolsover.

Shirebrook South station was on the Great Northern Railway's "Leen Valley Extension" line mentioned above, opened in November 1901 and closed in September 1931.

== Sport ==
The town's football club Shirebrook Town play in the First Division of the Northern Counties East Football League, and are based at Langwith Road. Before the current club was formed, Shirebrook Miners Welfare F.C. was the senior team in the area, competing in the FA Cup on occasion.

== Notable people ==
=== Actors ===
- John Hurt (1940–2017), actor, born in nearby Chesterfield and lived in Shirebrook as a child
- Colin Tarrant (1952–2012), actor, played Inspector Andrew Monroe in ITV's The Bill born in Shirebrook
- Jason Statham (born 1967), actor, born in Shirebrook

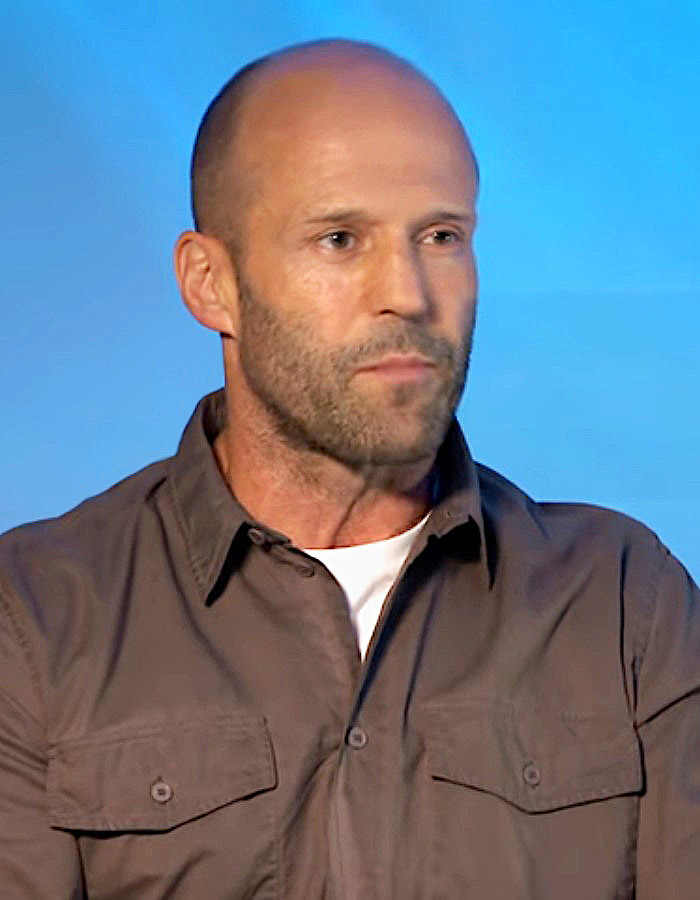
Jason Statham

=== Writers ===
Beth Steel (playwright), born and raised in Shirebrook.

=== Politicians ===
- General Sir John Coape Sherbrooke (1764–1830), General and administrator, Lieutenant Governor of Nova Scotia, surname derived from Shirebrook by his father upon marriage
- Enid Hattersley (1904–2001), politician, who became Lord Mayor of Sheffield in 1981.

=== Sport ===
- Ernie England (1901–1982), footballer who played 490 games including 355 for Sunderland
- Walter Keeton (1905–1980), cricketer who played 397 First-class cricket matches for Nottinghamshire
- Sammy Chessell (1921–1996), footballer who played 256 games for Mansfield Town
- Ray Wilson (1934–2018), footballer, played 409 games including 266 for Huddersfield and 63 for England, World Cup Winner, born in Shirebrook
- Barry Lyons (born 1945), footballer who played over 500 games including 203 for Nottingham Forest
- Les Robinson (born 1967), footballer who played 703 games including 459 for Oxford United
- Mason Bennett (born 1996), footballer, has played over 250 games, born in nearby Langwith and attended school in Shirebrook

== See also ==
- Listed buildings in Shirebrook
