= Listed buildings in Shirebrook =

Shirebrook is a civil parish in the Bolsover District of Derbyshire, England. The parish contains four listed buildings that are recorded in the National Heritage List for England. All the listed buildings are designated at Grade II, the lowest of the three grades, which is applied to "buildings of national importance and special interest". The parish consists of the town of Shirebrook and the surrounding area. The listed buildings consist of a farmhouse, a church and two schools.

== Buildings ==
Name and location	Photograph	Date	Notes
Stuffynwood Farmhouse; 53.18707°N 1.21700°W		17th century	The farmhouse is in sandstone with a pantile roof. There are two storeys and four bays. On the front is a porch, and in the upper floor is a loft doorway. The windows are a mix of casements and horizontally-sliding sashes.
Holy Trinity Church; 53.20214°N 1.21595°W		1844	The original part of the church, that later became part of the south aisle, is Norman in style. In 1904 the nave and chancel in Early English style were added, and in 1958 the east wall was rebuilt. The church is built in sandstone with Welsh slate roofs, and consists of a nave and chancel with a clerestory, a west narthex, a south aisle and chapel, a southwest porch, and a south vestry. There is a bellcote on the west gable of the south aisle. The narthex extends the full width of the nave, and is linked to it by flying buttresses. The gabled entrance is arched, and flanked by buttresses rising to polygonal turrets with foliage finials, outside which are trefoil-headed lancet windows, and above them is an open parapet. Above the narthex is a large three-light window with decorated stepped lancets, and there are lancet windows along the clerestory.
Eastern blocks, Shirebrook Model Village Primary School; 53.19985°N 1.21735°W		1908	The school, designed by G. H. Widdows, is in red brick with tile roofs. There are two parallel ranges, each with a single storey, containing gabled cross-wings at the ends and in the centre, and linking corridors. The gables contain three high-level two-light windows set in a semicircular-headed recess, and the corridors have flat-roofed dormers. The original verandahs have been removed or enclosed.
Shirebrook Lower School; 53.20600°N 1.20634°W	—	1924–26	The school, designed by G. H. Widdows, is in red brick with tiled Mansard and flat concrete roofs. It is in one and two storeys, and consists of three parallel ranges linked by covered ways, the north range with a boomerang plan. At the west end of the middle range is a taller assembly hall with a hipped roof. The windows are mullioned and transomed, and there are clerestory windows. The outer ranges had verandahs on the sides.
