= Chrysoglott =

Chrysoglott (occasionally Chrysoglott harp) is a term for a function of a Wurlitzer theatre organ. Chrysoglotts are struck tuned percussion instruments of metal bars, similar to a glockenspiel or celesta, used to achieve a bell or harp sound. The notes emitted from a Chrysoglott are typically one octave higher than those played on the keyboard of the organ.
