= Thomas Simpson (architect, born 1816) =

English architect

Shakespeare Street Wesleyan Reform Chapel 1854

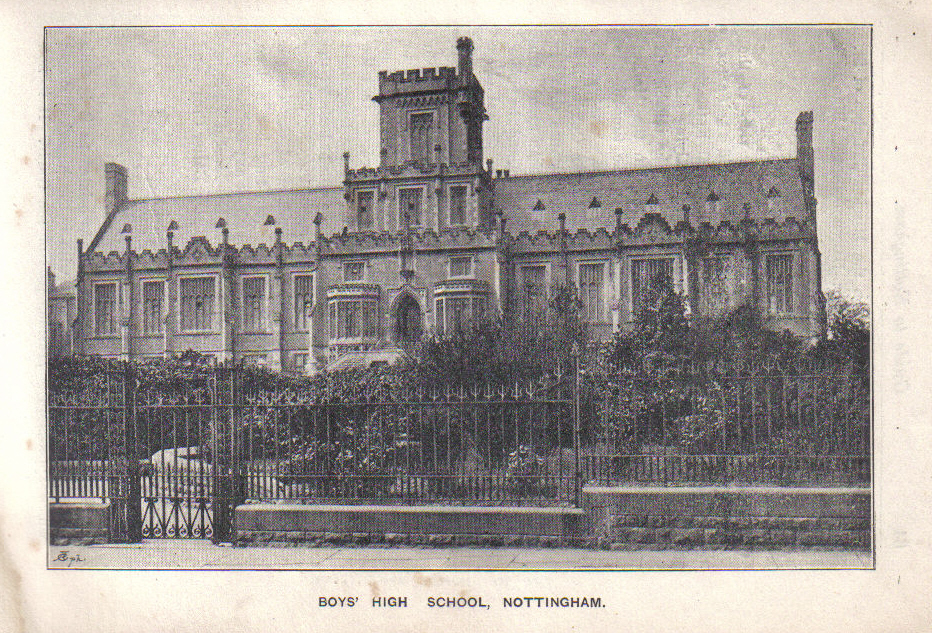
Nottingham High School 1866-67

Thomas Simpson (1816 – 16 March 1880) was an English architect based in Nottingham.

== Career ==
He married Charlotte Lovett (1819-1848) in the Wesleyan Chapel, Melton Mowbray and they had the following children:

- Alfred Simpson (1844–1847)
- Mary Ann Simpson (1846–1939)
- Charlotte Simpson (1848–1916)

He married Rebecca Goodacre (1820–1899) on 17 April 1849 in St Paul’s Church, Nottingham and they had the following child:

- Arthur Herbert Simpson (1854–1933)

He represented St Mary’s Ward on the Nottingham Town Council, and later the Trent Ward. He died at his house in Baker Street, Nottingham on 16 March 1880.

== Notable works ==
- Shakespeare Street Wesleyan Reform Chapel, Nottingham 1854 (later a synagogue, and now part of Nottingham Trent University)
- Hutchinson and Armitage, grocers and seed merchants, Poultry, Nottingham 1862
- Great Alfred Street Chapel, (United Methodist), Alfred Street, Nottingham 1864-65
- New Dining Hall, 5 Byard Lane, Nottingham 1865-66
- Temporary building for the Nottingham and Midland Counties’ Industrial Exhibition, Shakespere Street, Nottingham 1865-66
- Nottingham High School 1866-67
- Methodist Free Church, Cheetham 1868-69
- Nottingham Mechanics' Institute 1869
- New Methodist Free Church, Pye Bank 1870-71
- Wesleyan Methodist Chapel, Mansfield Road, Nottingham 1872
- School room for Queen's Walk Congregational Church, Nottingham 1872-73
- Exeter Hall, Peachey Street/Mansfield Road, Nottingham 1874-76
