= Byard Lane =

Street in Nottingham, England

Byard Lne
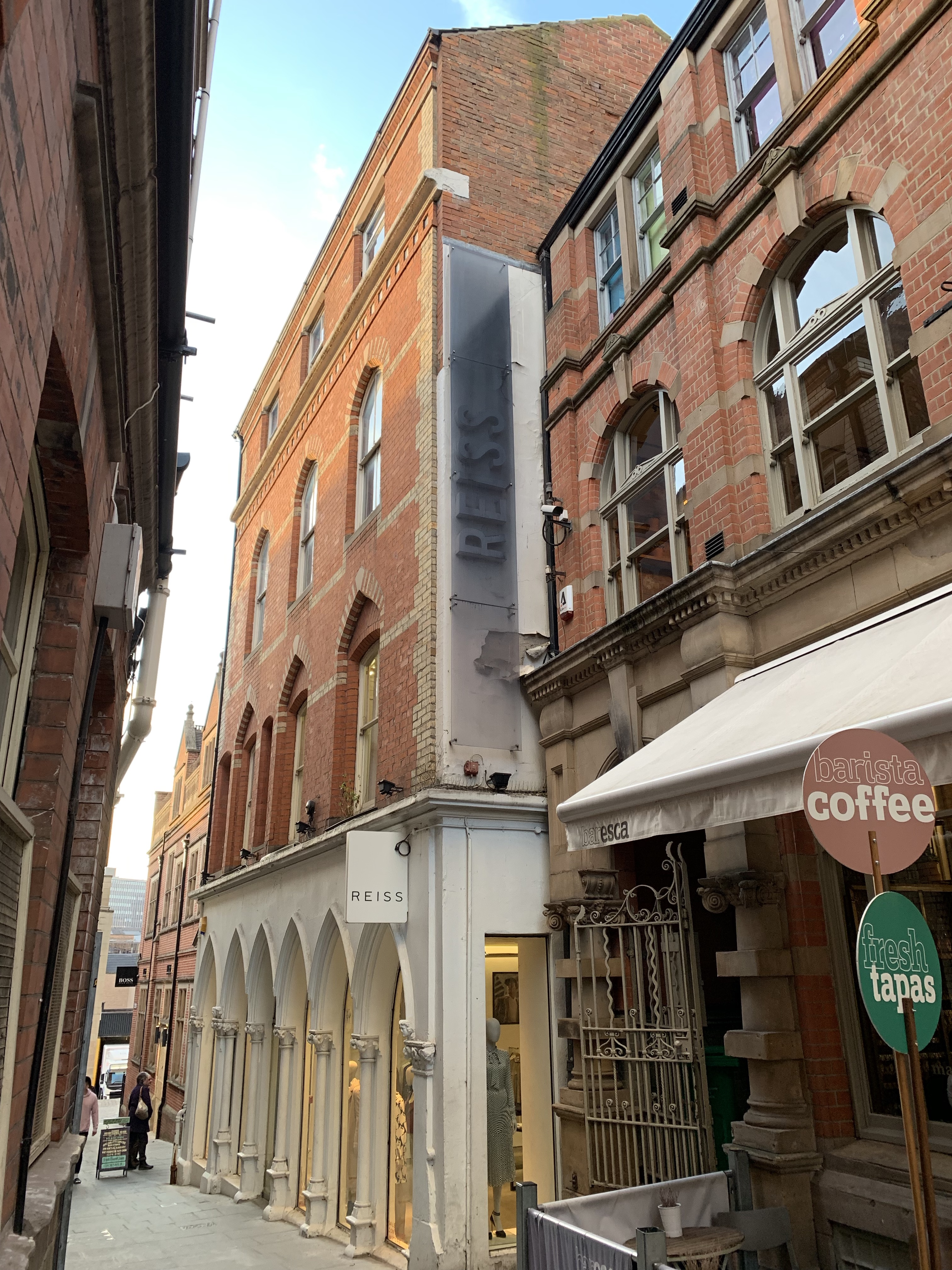
- 5 Byard Lane (1865-66)

- Location within Nottingham
- Maintained by: Nottingham City Council
- Coordinates: 52.9519°N 1.1479°W

Byard Lane is a pedestrianised shopping street in the city centre of Nottingham, England located between Fletcher Gate and Bridlesmith Gate.

== History ==
Byard Lane has existed since the Middle Ages when it was known as Walleonelane, Walloonlane or Wooler Lane probably a corruption of Wall-On Lane as it abutted the town defences.

In 1757, the early history of Methodism in the town had its roots here when Mary White hosted John Nelson and other early Methodists in her house in Chapel Court off Byard Lane. Chapel Court has now disappeared.

In the early 19th century, the Harlequin Public House and Bakehouse was at the top of the street.

In 1866, it became known as Dining Hall Street but it continued to be referred to by its former name and eventually Dining Hall Street was dropped and it reverted over time to Byard Lane.

== Notable buildings ==
=== North side ===
- 5, Dining Rooms by Thomas Simpson 1865-66 Grade II listed.
- 7-9, by Hedley John Price. Grade II listed.
- 15, Cross Keys Public House. Grade II listed by Robert Evans JP and Robert Evans (Jun).

=== South side ===
- 6, Shop for Paul Smith from 1970 until 2017.
