= Shakespeare Street Wesleyan Reform Chapel =

- Former chapel and former synagogue, now university hall, in June 2025
- Shakespeare Street Wesleyan Reform Chapel
- 52°57′27″N 1°09′08″W
- OS grid reference: SK 57064 40406
- Location: Shakespeare Street, Nottingham, England NG1 4FQ
- Country: England
- Denomination: Wesleyan Methodist

History
- Status: Chapel (1854–1953); Synagogue (1956–2017); University hall (since 2019)

Architecture
- Functional status: Closed; repurposed
- Architect: Thomas Simpson
- Completed: 1854
- Closed: 1953

Listed Building – Grade II
- Official name: Synagogue and attached area railings
- Type: Listed building
- Designated: 12 July 1972
- Reference no.: 1255018

Shakespeare Street Wesleyan Reform Chapel is a former Wesleyan Reform church on Shakespeare Street in Nottingham, England, in the United Kingdom. The building was converted in 1953 to a synagogue and is now a university hall. Whilst in use as a synagogue, in 1972 the building was listed as a Grade II building.

== History ==
The church was built in 1854 to designs by Thomas Simpson. The foundation stones were laid on 20 March 1854.

In 1941 the building suffered bomb damage and, despite being restored after the war, the closing service was held on 11 October 1953. It was then converted to an Orthodox synagogue of the Nottingham Hebrew Congregation who used the building from 1956 until 2017. In 2019 the building was sold and converted and extended by Nottingham Trent University as their University Hall, for graduation ceremonies, concerts and other events.

A new organ was installed in 1914 by John Compton.

== See also ==
- History of the Jews in England
- List of former synagogues in the United Kingdom
