= Hedley John Price =

English architect

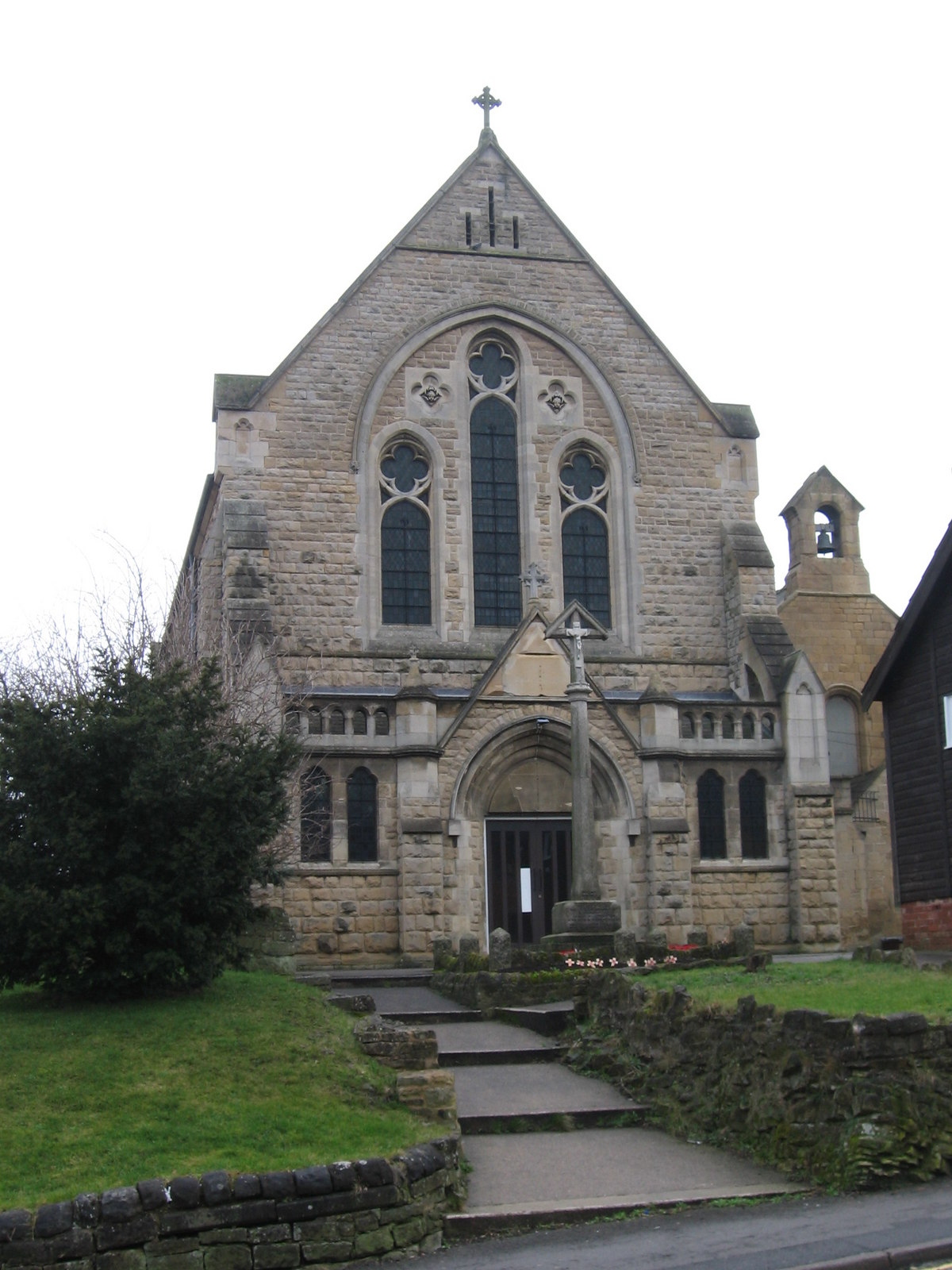
Holy Trinity Church, Shirebrook, Derbyshire 1904

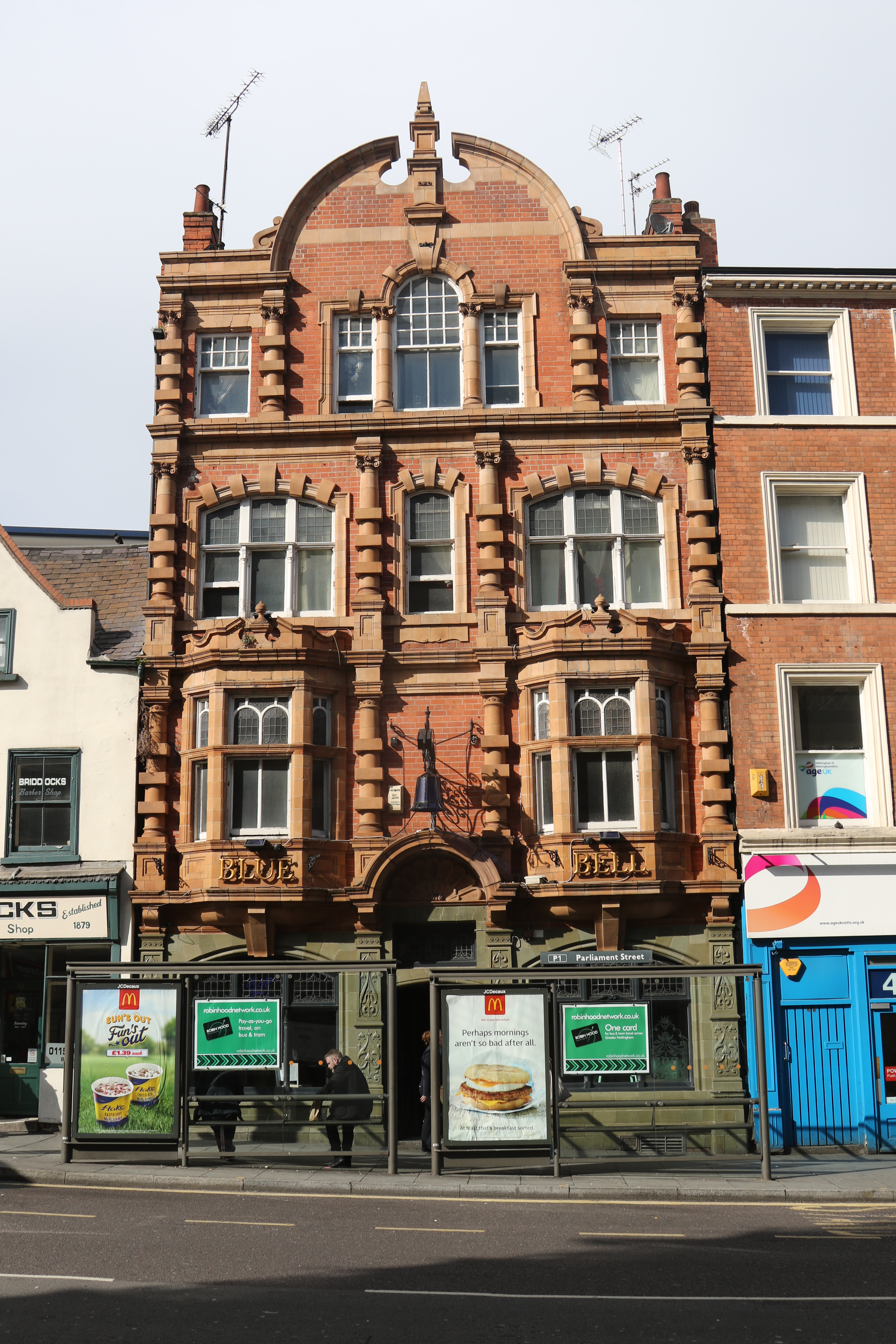
Blue Bell Public House, Upper Parliament Street, Nottingham 1904

Hedley John Price ARIBA (1861 – 8 April 1905) was an English architect based in Nottingham.

== Career ==
He was born in Liverpool in 1861, the son of John Price (b. 1829) and Mary (b. 1834). He was baptised on 22 September 1861 in St Anne’s Church, Stanley, Lancashire.

He was educated at Nottingham School of Art where he was awarded a Bronze medal for his design for a cathedral and University College Nottingham.

He studied as a pupil of Abraham Harrison Goodall for 5 years and then remained in this practice as his assistant for another 3 years.

He was appointed Associate of the Royal Institute of British Architects on 9 June 1884.

He married Annie Mary Charlesworth in 1898, and his son Hubert H.C. Price was born in 1900.

He died on 8 April 1905 at his home in The Park, Nottingham.and was buried in Church Cemetery, Nottingham on 11 April 1905.

== Notable works ==
- Cabmen’s shelter, Mansfield Road (opposite Bluecoat School), Nottingham 1894
- 24 houses on Muscosike Lane (now Humber Road), Beeston, 1897
- 2 shops, 96 and 98 Queen's Road, Beeston, ca. 1900
- 8 houses, 4, 6, 8, 10, 12, 14, 16, 18 Newton Street, Beeston, ca. 1900.
- Tea room and bakery, Forest Road East/Mansfield Road 1901
- St Stephen’s Hall (Mission Room and School), St Stephen's Church, Hyson Green, Nottingham 1902
- Livery Stables, (95) Talbot Street, Nottingham 1902
- 9 Byard Lane, Nottingham 1902
- Lace Warehouse, Broad Street, Nottingham 1903 (converted from Broad Street Baptist Church)
- Holy Trinity Church, Shirebrook, Derbyshire 1904
- Blue Bell Public House, 50 Upper Parliament Street, Nottingham 1904
