= Holy Trinity Church, Shirebrook =

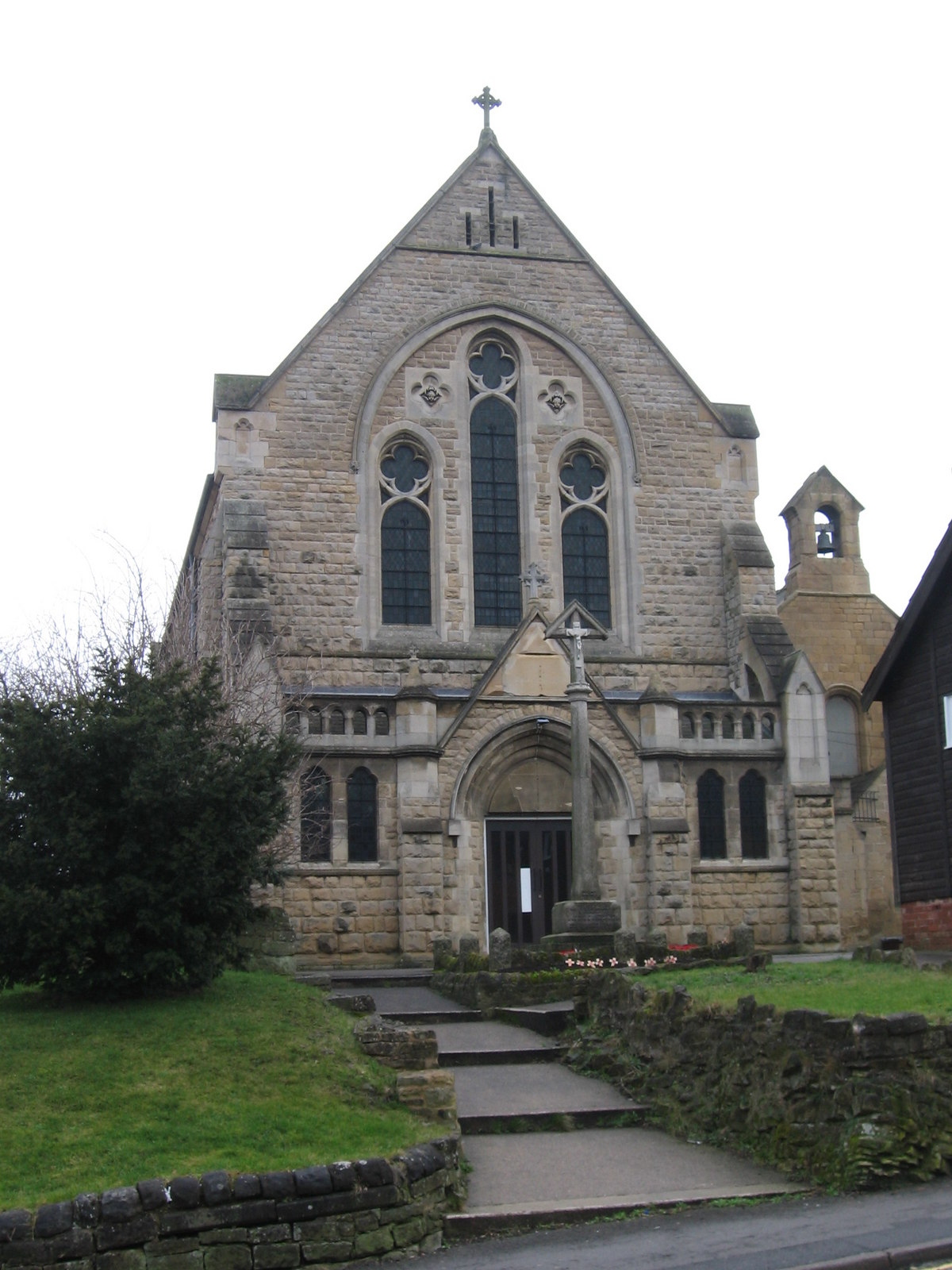
- Holy Trinity Church, Shirebrook

- Location within Derbyshire
- 53°12′7.2″N 1°12′59″W
- OS grid reference: SK 52475 67509
- Location: Heage, Derbyshire
- Country: England
- Denomination: Church of England

History
- Dedication: Holy Trinity
- Consecrated: 9 October 1844

Architecture
- Heritage designation: Grade II listed
- Architect(s): Patterson and Hine 1844, Hedley John Price 1904

Specifications
- Length: 114 feet (35 m)

Administration
- Province: Canterbury
- Diocese: Derby
- Archdeaconry: Chesterfield
- Deanery: Hardwick
- Parish: Shirebrook

Holy Trinity Church is a Grade II listed parish church in the Church of England in Shirebrook, Derbyshire.

== History ==
Construction of the first church in Shirebrook started in 1843. It was designed by William Patterson and Thomas Chambers Hine of Nottingham. and cost £1,000 (equivalent to £109,900 in 2025). It was consecrated by the Bishop of Lichfield, Rt. Revd. John Lonsdale on 9 October 1844.

It was extended with the construction of a nave to the designs of the architect Hedley John Price. The old church building became the south aisle. This increased capacity from 200 to 800 persons. The nave was dedicated by the Bishop of Southwell, Rt. Revd. George Ridding on 30 April 1904. The walling was built by Wilkinson and Sons of Bulwell with the roof slating by A Wright of Nottingham. The electrical works were by Thomas Danks of Nottingham and the oak seating was provided by Addison and Company of Wellington, Shropshire.

The brass eagle lectern was donated in 1904 by Mrs Harker, and was a replica of the one given by Queen Victoria to Sandringham Church. The people of Shirebrook donated to a shilling fund which paid for the panelling of the high altar.

There is a brass memorial tablet to Joseph Paget, died 1896, by Benham & Froud of London and one to Revd. John Cargill who died in 1876, designed by Cox & Sons of London.

Two stained glass windows by Abbott & Co. of Lancaster date from the early 1930s.

The chancel furnishings date from the 1960s and were designed by Frank Knight of Wellingborough.

Former vicars have included Arnold Herbert Hunt, father of actor John Hurt.

== Organ ==
The organ was built by J. W. Walker & Sons Ltd in 1950.

== See also ==
- Listed buildings in Shirebrook
