= London After Dark =

London After Dark was a joint venture radio program between CBS Radio and BBC Radio that ran during the 1940 London Blitz.

== Beginning ==
The show began on August 24, 1940 when CBS News Chief Paul White and CBS European Events Director Edward R. Murrow began to arrange the show by cable and short wave conference. Murrow lined up nine commentators from America, Britain and Canada, with the help of the BBC and the CBC, and set them up all over London with microphones.

The commentators featured on the first edition of London After Dark were Murrow, CBC radio reporter Robert Bowman, Raymond Glendenning, Larry LeSueur, Eric Sevareid, Vincent Sheean, Michael Standing, Wynford Vaughan-Thomas, and J. B. Priestley.

The program opens with light organ music played by Canadian-born theatre organist Sandy MacPherson.

The first commentator heard on London After Dark was none other than Edward Murrow himself. He broadcast live from Trafalgar Square in London, a broadcast now world-famous. "This is Trafalgar Square. The noise you hear at the moment is the sound of the air-raid siren," Murrow said as he calmly described the scene.

From the square that first program moved on to Robert Bowman who was stationed in the kitchen of the Savoy Hotel. Bowman described the menu, eight hors d'oeuvres and eight different kinds of meat and talked to famed Chef François Latry. The atmosphere at the Savoy was seemingly joyous.

The program then jumped to an anti-aircraft battery and then to and Air Raid Precautions Station. Then, onto Hammersmith Palais, London's big dance hall where Eric Sevareid was set up and remarked, "There was an air raid alarm, as you know, 15 minutes ago. The orchestra leader simply announced they'd go on playing as the crowd wished to stay and I don't expect more than half a dozen people have left."

Vincent Sheean was up next on that first edition of London After Dark. Sheean spoke briefly on the silent streets of Piccadilly Circus before the program went to some interviews with trainmen in Euston Station by the BBC. Finally the show wound up with J.B. Priestley in Whitehall.
