= Alick Maclean =

English composer and conductor

Alexander "Alick" Morvaren Maclean (20 July 1872 – 18 May 1936) was an English composer and conductor.

== Life ==
Maclean's father Charles Maclean was Director of Music at Eton College. The younger Maclean was born there and later went to the school. He was intended for an army career, but resigned his commission in 1921 to continue his musical studies.

He became interested in opera early and wrote his three-act comic opera Crichton at the age of 20. Quentin Durward, originally called The King's Prize, followed in 1894, the first to be staged. It was revived in January 1920 at the Theatre Royal, Newcastle-on-Tyne by the Carl Rosa Opera Company. Then came an 'English' verismo work called Petruccio, which was presented in a double-bill with Cavalleria rusticana at the Royal Opera in London, on 29 June 1895. As an opera composer he enjoyed more success in Germany than in England, and two of his later works were staged in Mainz. The librettist for all his works was his sister, writing under the pseudonym Sheridan Ross.

Between 1899 and 1912 Maclean was the musical director of Wyndham’s Theatres, where he wrote incidental music. From 1912 to 1935 he conducted the Spa Orchestra at Scarborough. The Queen's Hall Light Orchestra was founded in 1916 with Maclean as conductor to cater for the growing demand for light music at the Queen's Hall Chappell Ballad Concerts. He stayed until 1923. Through the orchestra Maclean met Eric Coates, who became a close friend.

At the Scarborough Music Festival of 1920, which he directed and conducted, Maclean put on concert versions of his operas Quentin Durward, The Hunchback of Cremona and scenes from his oratorio The Annunciation. He died in London in 1936.

=== Stage works ===
- Crichton (unperformed, c. 1892)
- Quentin Durward (London, 1894)
- Petruccio (London, 1895)
- Die Liebegeige (The Hunchback of Cremona) (Mainz, 1906)
- Maître Seiler (London, 1909)
- Die Waldidylle (Mainz, 1913)

=== Choral ===
- The Annunciation, oratorio (1909)
- Choral Song
- Lament
- At the Eastern Gate (1922)

=== Orchestral ===
- The Jest, overture (from his incidental music)
- The Mayflower, symphonic prelude (performed 1923)
- Mistralia, tone poem (1932)
- Rapsodie monégasque (1935)
- Rapsodie monégasque (1935)

=== Recordings ===
Maclean recorded for His Master's Voice and Columbia, especially with the New Queen’s Hall Light Orchestra.

== Quentin Maclean ==
His son Quentin Maclean (1896–1962) was a theatre organist who also gave the British premiere of Hindemith's Organ Concerto in 1934 and composed his own Organ Concerto in 1935. Maclean was one of four organists to perform for the inauguration of the BBC Theatre Organ in 1936. He emigrated to Canada in 1939.
