= Robert Bowman (journalist) =

Canadian broadcast journalist (c. 1910 – 1984

Robert Bowman (c. 1910 – 26 July 1984) was a broadcast journalist for the Canadian Broadcasting Corporation (CBC). He was the son of Charles A. Bowman, editor of the Ottawa Citizen newspaper, and a member of the Aird Commission that recommended Canada have a public broadcasting system.

During World War II he covered the London Blitz, and in the radio programme London After Dark, broadcast 20 August 1940, he is heard interviewing chef Francois Latry at the Savoy Hotel in London.

On the Dieppe Raid of 19 August 1942 - the bloodiest single day of the war for Canada - he was attached to the Canadian troops, and broadcast on Canadian radio the next day. In a 1984 radio interview he explained some of the challenges of the time.

Bowman died, age 74, on 26 July 1984, while on vacation in Miramichi, New Brunswick.
