= Geneva Organ Company =

Musical instrument manufacturer

The Geneva Organ Company was an American manufacturer of pipe organs.

During the age of silent films, the company was a small but notable maker of theatre organs. It produced organs under various names, including Geneva Organs, Smith Unit Organs, and Smith-Geneva Organs.

Some Geneva organs that still exist in public venues include a 2-manual organ at the Palace Theatre in Luverne, Minnesota, and a 3-manual organ at the Arcada Theatre in St. Charles Illinois.
