= John Compton (organ builder) =

British organ builder (1876–1957)

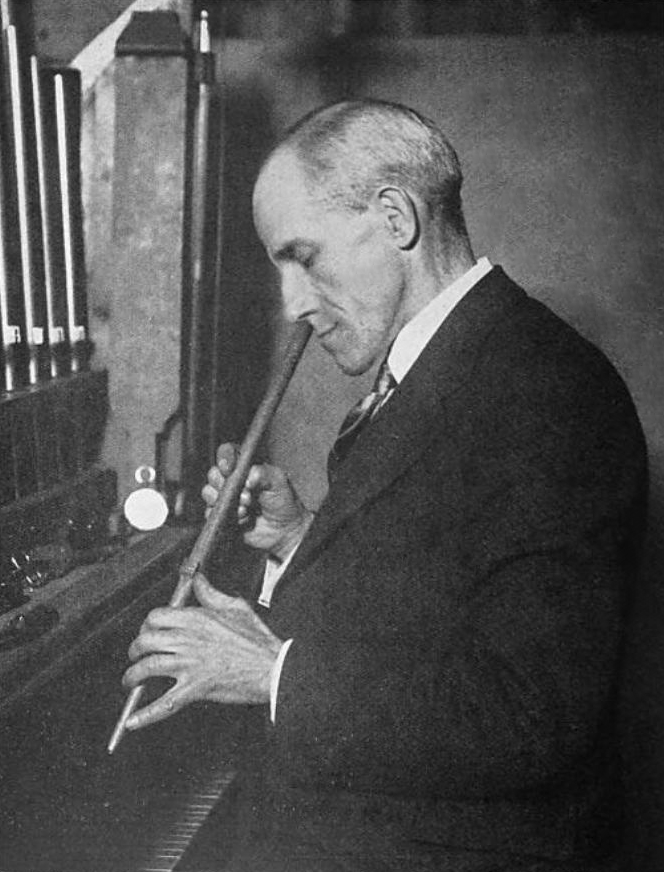
- Born: 20 June 1876; Newton Burgoland, Leicestershire, England
- Died: 6 April 1957 (aged 80); Ealing, West London, England
- Occupation: Organ builder

John Haywood Compton (1876–1957) was an English pipe organ builder. His business based in Nottingham and London flourished between 1902 and 1965.

== Life ==
John Compton was born in Newton Burgoland, Leicestershire, England on 20 June 1876. He was an apprentice with Halmshaw & Sons in Birmingham. In 1898, he joined Brindley and Foster in Sheffield. Then he joined Charles Lloyd in Nottingham.

He set up the business of Musson & Compton in 1902 in Nottingham with James Frederick Musson. The partnership was dissolved in 1904. In 1919, the business moved to workshops at Turnham Green Terrace in Chiswick, London, which had been vacated by August Gern. He occupied a new factory at Chase Road in Park Royal, North Acton, London in 1930.

Compton worked primarily on electric-action pipe organs and electronic organs. His first electronic instrument was the Melotone, a solo voice added to theatre organs, followed by the Theatrone. The Electrone, an electrostatic tonewheel instrument introduced in 1938, evolved out of research by Leslie Bourn, an association begun in the 1920s. Throughout his organ-building career, Compton was assisted by the very capable and inventive James Isaac Taylor, who spent his entire working life with the Compton firm before his death in 1958. Compton also befriended a wealthy industrialist by the name of Albert Henry Midgley, one of the founders of C A Vandervell which later became CAV-Lucas Ltd; a major supplier of electrical equipment to the motor industry. Midgley was one of the most prolific inventors of his age, with over 900 inventions to his name. Following a rift with C A V-Lucas, he was appointed technical director of the Compton firm in 1925. Midgley's genius in electrical engineering and mass-production techniques helped the Compton firm to achieve an extraordinary level of productivity. The company was awarded many original patents in things ranging from simple organ mechanisms to the most complex, state-of-the-art electronic and electrical inventions. Many of those patents show that Midgley was cited as the inventor.

On 13 June 1940, during the Second World War, Compton was arrested in Italy while holidaying on the island of Capri. He was interned as an enemy alien but spent much of his time restoring pipe organs before being permitted to return to England.

Compton died at King Edward's Hospital in Ealing on 6 April 1957, and was cremated at Mortlake Crematorium. The business continued under the direction of Taylor, who died the next year. The business was wound up around 1965. The pipe organ department was sold to Rushworth and Dreaper and the electronic department became Makin Organs.

== Compton organs ==
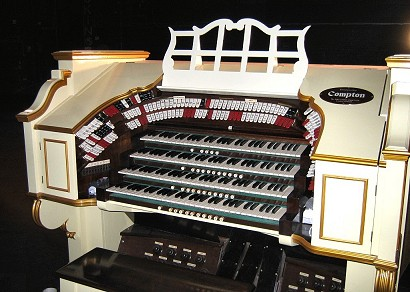
Restored Apollo pipe organ console

Compton cinema organs, built by the John Compton Organ Company of Acton, were the most prevalent of theatre organs in the UK. 261 were installed in cinemas and theatres in the British Isles. Comptons made many fine church and concert organs as well. The company's cinema organs employed the latest technology and engineering and many are still in existence. One of the most notable is the large 5 manual example at the Odeon Cinema Leicester Square in central London. The Pavilion Theatre, Bournemouth in Dorset continues to operate its stunning example, with regular performances from organists from across the United Kingdom.

== List of new organs ==
- All Souls' Church, Radford, 1903
- Emmanuel Church, Nottingham, 1903
- United Methodist Free Church, Stapleford, 1903
- Church of St. Mary Magdalene, Hucknall, 1903
- Emmanuel Church, New Park St, Leicester, 1905
- St Wilfrid's Church, Cantley, South Yorkshire, 1905
- Selby Abbey, North Yorkshire, 1906
- St. Peter's School Chapel, York, 1907
- Launceston Wesleyan Church,1909
- Holdenhurst Road Methodist Church, Bournemouth, 1909
- Westbourne Wesleyan Church, Bournemouth, 1910
- Shakespeare Street Wesleyan Reform Chapel, Nottingham, 1914
- Stowmarket Parish Church, 1922
- St Swithun's Church, Cheswardine, Shropshire, 1922 memorial for those killed in the 1914-1918 war
- Shepherd's Bush Pavilion, 1923
- Bournemouth Pavilion Theatre, 1929
- Elite Picture Theatre, Nottingham, 1930
- Chapel Cranleigh School Surrey, 1930. Eight ranks, three manuals. Lasted until 1978. Verifiable on NPOR site.
- Church of St Osmund, Parkstone, 1931
- Downside Abbey, 1931
- St. Mary Magdelene's Church, Paddington, 1932
- Church of St Edmund the King and Martyr, Lombard Street, London, 1932
- BBC Theatre Organ Broadcasting House, London, 1932
- Broadway Theatre, Catford, 1932 (contemporaneously, a music hall)
- Plaza Cinema, Stockport, 1932
- O2 Forum Kentish Town, 1934
- St Luke's Church, Chelsea, 1932
- Odeon Cinema, Weston-super-Mare, 1935
- St. Benedict's Priory, Ealing, 1935
- East Church of St Nicholas, Aberdeen, 1936
- Southampton Guildhall, 1936
- Regent Street Cinema, London, 1936
- St. George's Hall, London, second BBC Theatre Organ, 1936
- Maida Vale Studios, third BBC Theatre Organ, 1936
- Odeon Cinema, Leicester Square, 1937
- Emmanuel United Reformed Church, Worthing, 1937 (formerly St Columba's Presbyterian Church)
- Savoy Cinema, Lincoln 1937
- Wolverhampton Civic Hall, 1938
- Methodist Mission, Great Yarmouth, 1938
- St John's Cathedral, Salford, 1938
- Church House, Westminster, 1939
- Christchurch Priory, 1951
- St Eugene's Cathedral, Derry, 1956
- St Bride's Church, London, 1957
- St George's Cathedral, Southwark, 1958
- St Alban's Golders Green, London
- Bablake School, Coventry
- Westover (now ABC) Cinema, Bournemouth, c.1937
- Astoria Cinema, Pokesdown, c.1930s

(The last two organs are unconfirmed, but their existence is attested to by local documentary sources. The Westover instrument is now in private hands at Ryde on the Isle of Wight; the Astoria instrument no longer exists.)

- Southern Grammar School for Boys, Portsmouth, c. 1957
- Portsmouth Guildhall, 1959
- St.Alban's Holborn, 1961

== Rebuilds and restorations ==
- Holy Trinity Church, Hull, 1938
- Holy Trinity Church, Exmouth, 1953
- Christ Church Pennington, Leigh, 1953
- Kinema in the Woods (formerly at the Super Cinema, Charing Cross Road, London, February 1928)
- St Catherine, Bearwood, Wokingham, Berkshire,1952 (NPOR A00449)
- Tower Hill Methodist Church, Hessle, 2001 (formerly at Oxted United Reformed Church, Surrey)
- St Mark's, Portsmouth, 1955, later moved to St Edmund's, Southampton in 1969

== Other sources ==
- Ivor Buckingham. "The Compton List: dedicated to the John Compton Organ Company and its products". Archived from the original on 29 September 2009. Includes details on Theatrones and Electrones
- "Compton Organ". Penistone Cinema Organ Trust. Archived from the original on 21 August 2008.
