= Theatre organ =

Style of pipe organ used for entertainment

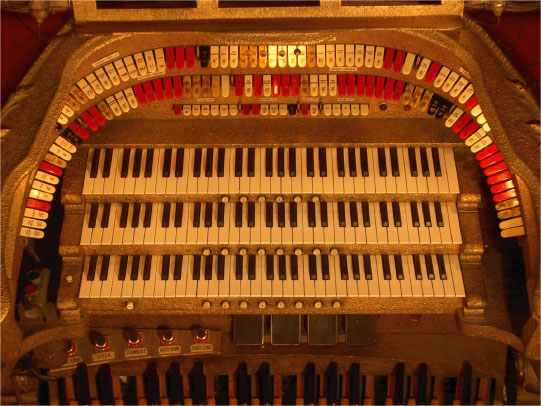
Console of the 3/13 Barton Theatre Pipe Organ at Ann Arbor's Michigan Theatre

A theatre organ, also known as a theater organ or cinema organ in the United Kingdom, is a type of pipe organ developed to accompany silent films from the 1900s to the 1920s.

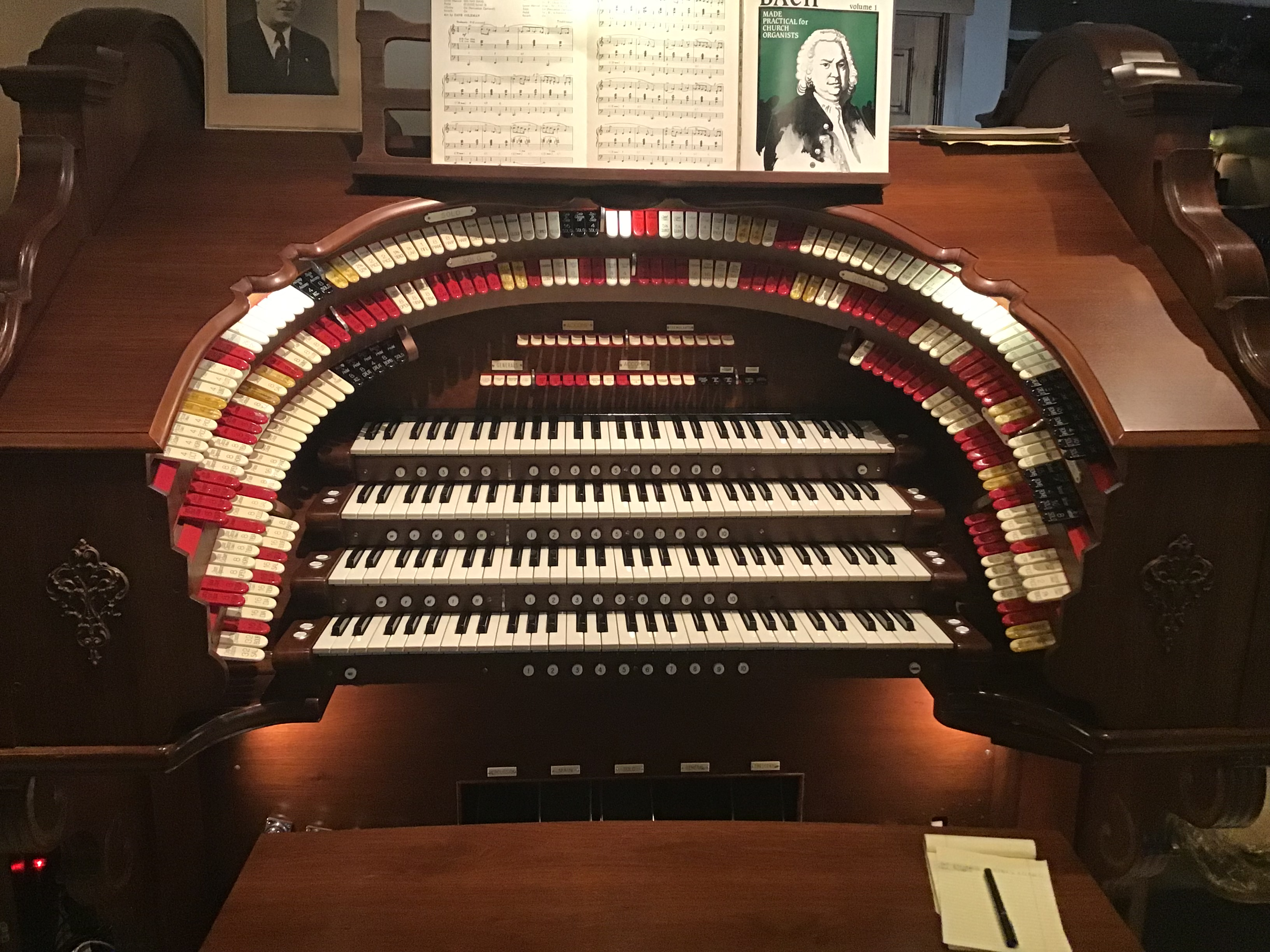
Four manual Devtronix Theater Organ Console

Theatre organs have horseshoe-shaped arrangements of stop tabs (tongue-shaped switches) above and around the instrument's keyboards on their consoles. Theatre organ consoles were typically decorated with brightly colored stop tabs, with built-in console lighting. Organs in the UK had a common feature: large translucent surrounds extending from both sides of the console, with internal colored lighting. Theatre organs began to be installed in other venues, such as civic auditoriums, sports arenas, private residences, and, though quite uncommon, churches.

Though there are few original instruments, hundreds of theatre pipe organs are installed in public venues throughout the world today, while many more exist in private residences.

Some theatre organs have been digitally sampled to create digital sample sets of both free and paid for softwares like the free GrandOrgue or the paid Hauptwerk which can allow anyone to play it. A popular free sample set is the 3/10 Redford Theatre Barton organ along with a downgraded 3/7 and an extended 3/12 version. An alternative is the Miditzer which is rather synthesised and not based on samples.

== History ==
Originally, films were accompanied by pit orchestras in larger houses, and pit pianists in small venues. The first organs installed in theatres were church organs. These organs were ill-suited to accompanying the film and the performance.

The earliest concepts of the theatre organ were modified pianos with a few ranks of pipes and various sound effects, housed in one cabinet, and typically located in the pit area. These were photoplayers.

Robert Hope-Jones's concept, which he called a "unit orchestra", was developed and promoted, initially by the Rudolph Wurlitzer Company of North Tonawanda, New York. A new type of instrument, the Wurlitzer Hope Jones Unit-Orchestra, or simply theatre organ, was born. Soon, hundreds of instruments were being ordered from Wurlitzer and other manufacturers who copied the design for their own theatre organs.

The Rudolph Wurlitzer company, to whom Robert Hope-Jones licensed his name and patents, was the most well-known manufacturer of theatre organs, and the phrase Mighty Wurlitzer became an almost generic term for the theatre organ. After some major disagreements with the Wurlitzer management, Robert Hope-Jones committed suicide in 1914.

In Europe, the theatre organ appeared in cinemas after World War I. Some came from Wurlitzer, but there were European organ builders like M. Welte & Söhne and Walcker in Germany, and Standaart in the Netherlands.

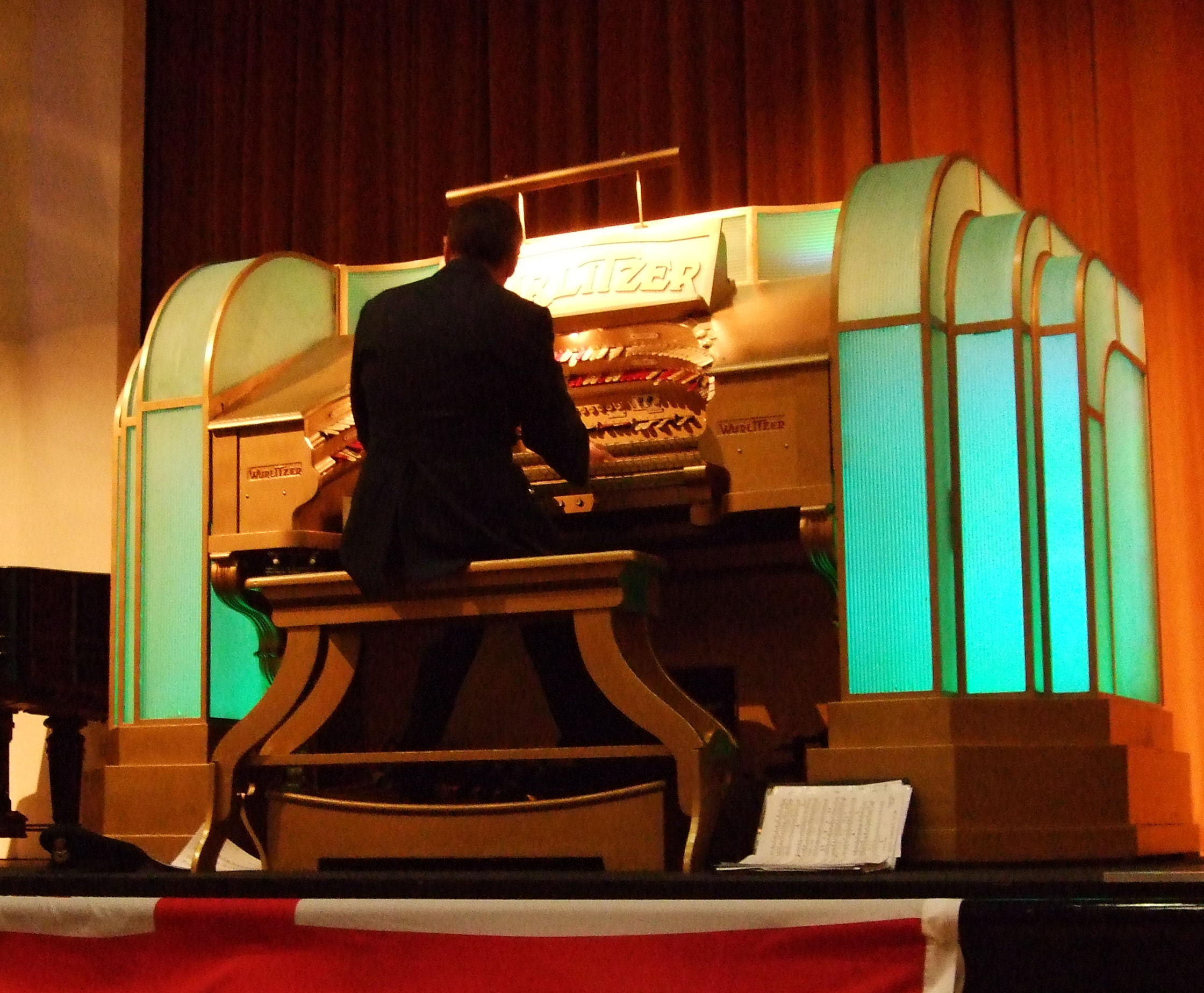
Wurlitzer at the Musical Museum in London, showing the Art Deco framing lighting panels showcasing the organ console

The elegantly dressed virtuoso organist, playing at a huge console that could sometimes rise up through the floor on a lift, was an iconic image of the 1920s and 1930s Art Deco aesthetic, for example parodied by Monty Python. After the development of sound movies, theatre organs remained installed in many theatres to provide live music between features.

The British Broadcasting Corporation bought and installed its first organ in 1933 in Broadcasting House, London. The first full-scale BBC Theatre Organ was used for broadcasts in 1936 from across the road at St George's Hall. After the "golden years" of the 1920s and 1930s, many organs were scrapped or sold to churches, private homes, museums, ice rinks, rollatoriums, and restaurants.

In the 1950s, the development of high-fidelity recording and the LP phonograph record created new interest in the theatre organ. This period also saw the formation of the American Theatre Organ Society (ATOS), originally the American Theatre Organ Enthusiasts (ATOE).

=== Manufacturers and production totals ===
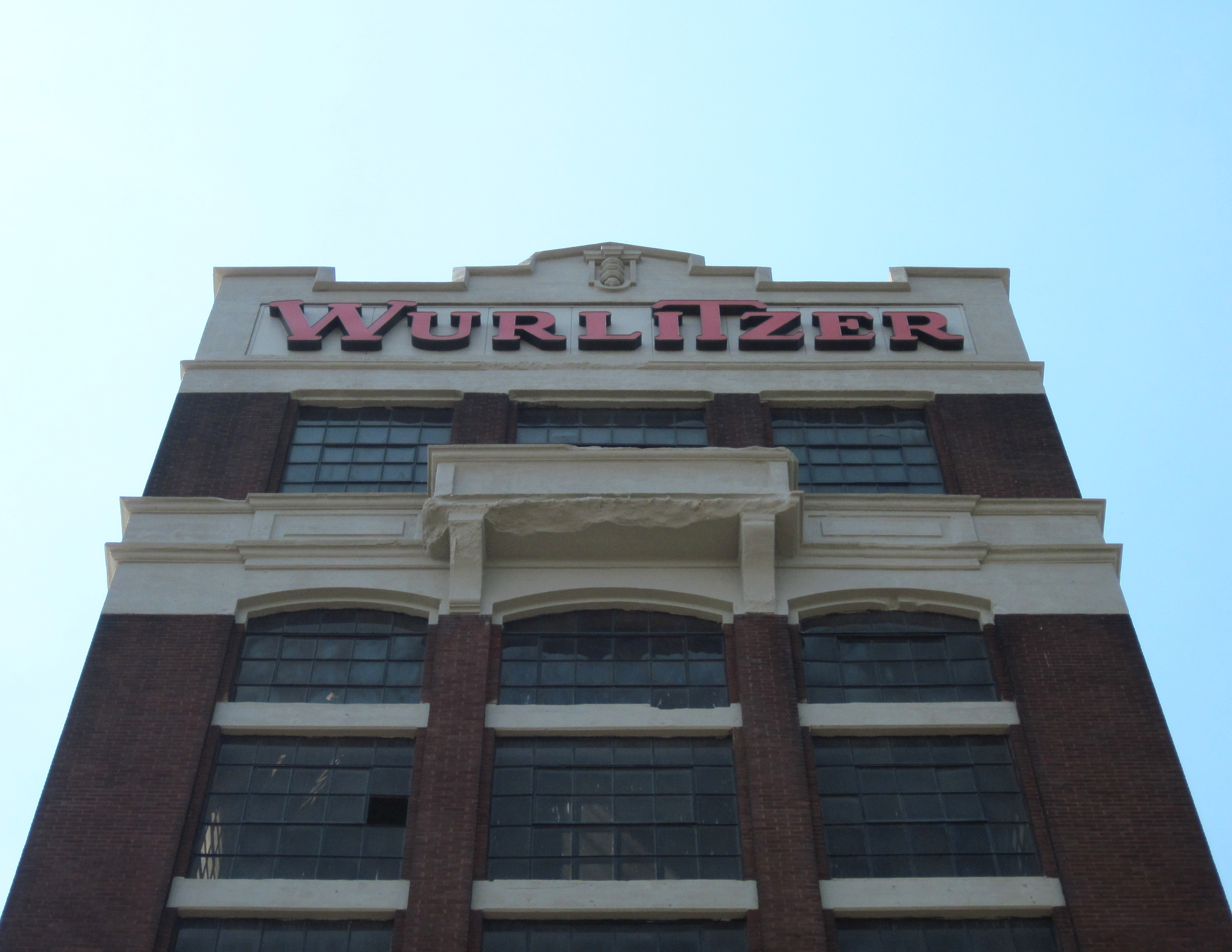
The offices of the Wurlitzer factory in New York, previously known as the North Tonawanda Barrel Organ Factory.

These were the major builders of theatre organs, listed in order of production. The numbers listed here are for theatre organs only.

Manufacturer	Production	Timeframe
Wurlitzer	over 2,234	1911–1942
Robert Morton	about 900	1920s–1931
Möller	about 700	
Kimball	about 700	
Marr and Colton	500–600	1915–1932
Barton	250–350	1918–1931
Kilgen	200–300	
Robert Hope-Jones	246	1887–1911, sold to Wurlitzer.
Hillgreen-Lane	about 175	
Estey	about 170	
Austin	about 130	
Link	about 130	1914–1932
Page	over 100	1922–1930
Balcom and Vaughan	about 75	
Reuter	about 57	
Hill, Norman & Beard (Christie)	over 52	1926–1938
Midmer-Losh	about 50	
Compton		
Geneva		
Welte-Mignon		
Wicks		

== Technical aspects ==
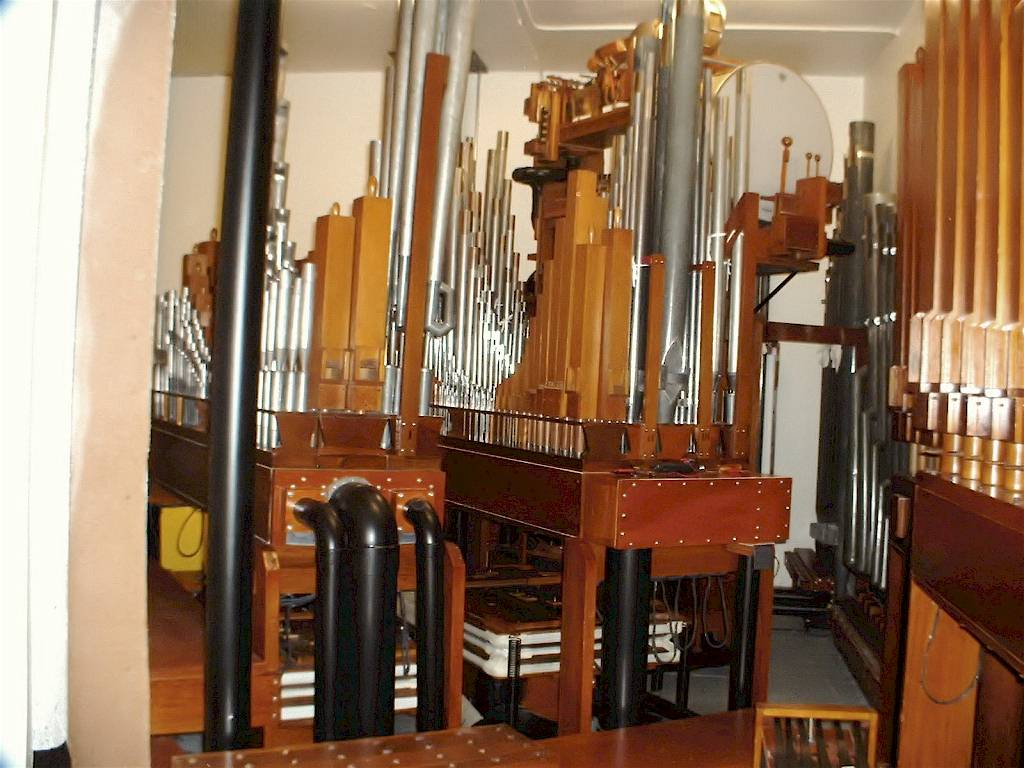
View inside pipe chamber at Meyer Theatre, in Green Bay, Wisconsin.

As in a traditional pipe organ, a theatre organ uses pressurized air to produce musical tones. However, unification, duplexing, and extension give the theatre organ its unique flexibility. A rank is extended by adding pipes above and below the original pitch, allowing the organist to play that rank at various pitches by selecting separate stop tabs.

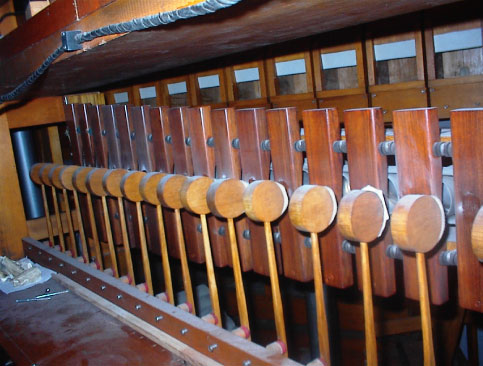
Marimba in the Solo Chamber at Ann Arbor's Michigan Theatre (3/13 Barton)

The electro-pneumatic action was invented by Robert Hope-Jones. Up to the turn of the 20th century, all pipe organs were operated by a tracker, tubular pneumatic, or pneumatic Barker-lever action, where the keys and pedals were physically connected to the pipe valves via wooden trackers, except in the case of tubular pneumatic, where all actions were operated by air pressure. Hope-Jones' electro-pneumatic action used electric solenoids to operate the pipe valves, and solenoids and pistons to control and operate the various stop tabs, controls, keys and pedals on the console. This action allowed the console to be physically detached from the organ. All signals from the console were transmitted by an electric cable to an electro-pneumatic relay, and from there to the pipes and effects in the organ chambers.

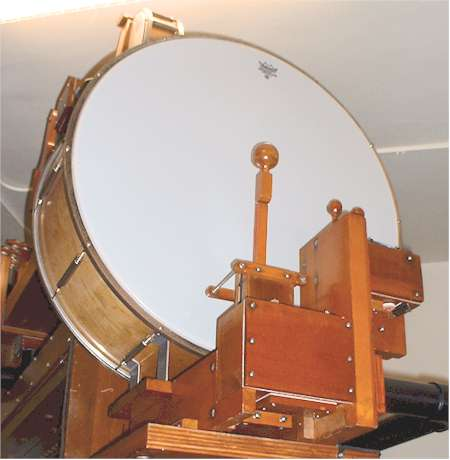
Percussion on a Wurlitzer at the Meyer Theatre in Green Bay, Wisconsin.

Another feature of theatre organs is the addition of chromatic, or tuned percussions. Hope-Jones added pneumatically and electrically operated instruments such as xylophones, wood harps, chimes, sleigh bells, chrysoglotts and glockenspiels to reproduce the orchestral versions of these instruments.

Wurlitzer added other effects, such as drums, cymbals, wood blocks and other non-chromatic percussions and effects to allow the theatre organ to accompany silent movies. Examples of sound effects included car horns and flings.

A traditional organ console was not adequate to control a theatre organ, as the large number of draw knobs required made the console so huge an organist could not possibly reach all of them while playing. Thus, the horseshoe console was born. Based on a curved French console design and using stop tabs instead of drawknobs, the horseshoe console now allowed the organist to reach any stop or control while playing any piece of music, eliminating the need to move around awkwardly on the bench. The smaller stop tabs also permitted the addition of many more stops on the console than could be added on a traditional console.

== New and old organs ==
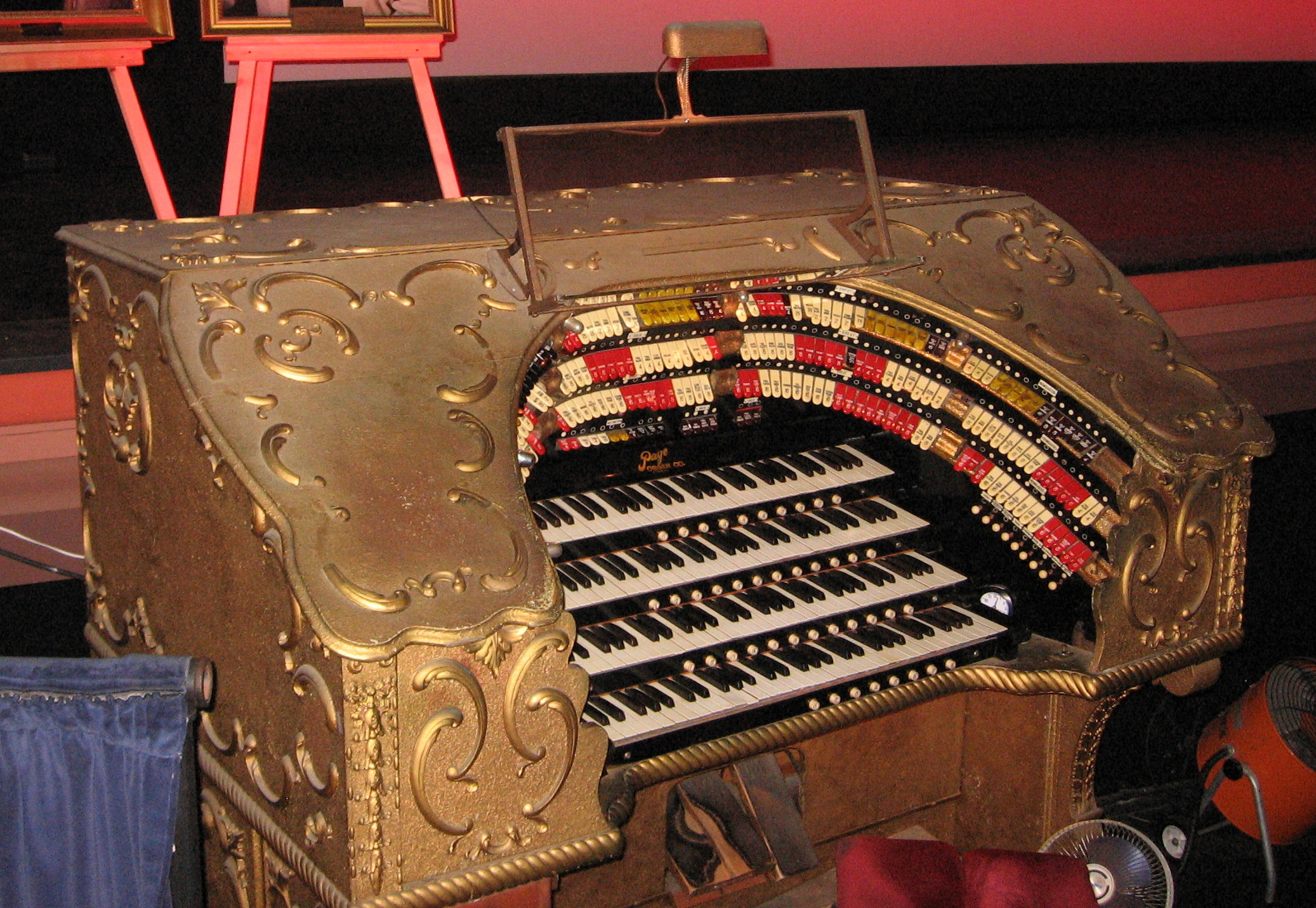
Avalon Casino's Page Organ console with portraits of Gaylord Carter and Bob Salisbury.

So-called "new" organs have been recently built, mainly from parts of other theatre organs, with construction of new pipework, windchests and consoles.

Some of these refurbished organs have had their original electro-pneumatic relays replaced with electronic or computerized relays and modern, electronic consoles.

== See also ==
- Capri Theatre, home of Australia's second largest theatre organ
- Photoplayer, an automatic piano and orchestra used by smaller theatres to accompany silent films
- Winter Gardens, Blackpool
- Wurlitzers in the United Kingdom
- Bartola Musical Instrument Company
