= Doreen Chadwick =

British pianist and theatre organist

Doreen Chadwick (7 August 1918 – 26 June 2014) was a British pianist and theatre organist. She was known for being the organist at the Odeon and Gaumont cinemas in Manchester, broadcasting organ recitals on BBC Radio, including on The Organist Entertains, and for her performances in the US, Holland, and Britain.

== Early life ==
Doreen Chadwick was born on 7 August 1918 in Maesycoed, Pontypridd, Wales to father Wyndham Chadwick (20 June 1890 – 4 November 1955), an engine driver on the GWR, and mother Alice Maud (née Dagg, 6 June 1895 – 23 September 1970), a harmonium player. Chadwick, the eldest of her siblings, lived with her family in Rosser Street, Maesycoed, and attended Pontypridd Intermediate Girls' School.

Chadwick started playing the piano at the age of seven and, in January 1929, at the age of ten, she passed her primary grade in piano. However, her love of Reginald Dixon made her give up the piano and focus on the church organ, playing at the Parish Church in Pontypridd. She played the "straight" organ and carried on with lessons, taking her ALCM diploma at the age of 16. She practiced on a concert-type organ at the Palladium, Pontypridd.

After leaving school, Chadwick worked as a short-hand typist while continuing to train to be an organist. By 1930, the family had moved to Tel-el-Kebir Road, Hopkinstown, before settling in South Street, Abercynon, four years later, where her mother lived until her death in 1970.

In June 1935, at the age of 16, Chadwick won first prize for pipe organ solos at the Urdd Eisteddfod (the Annual Welsh-language youth festival) at Carmarthen. The following year, in 1936, she was awarded the gold medal, then the silver in 1937, and then gold medal again in 1938 and 1939 at the Railwaymen's Eisteddfod held in Reading, judged by Sir Walford Davies.

On 8 June 1937, at the age of 18, Chadwick commenced a series of organ recitals which were broadcast on BBC Radio from St Catherine's Church, Pontypridd, becoming the youngest female organist to broadcast straight recitals. Chadwick gave her second recital on 21 May 1938 from St Catherine's Church.

Chadwick learned to play the cinema organ at the Castle Cinema, Merthyr Tydfil, under the tuition of Gene Lynn.

== Career ==
Chadwick's first job was as resident organist at the Rex Cinema, Aberdare, between July 1940 and September 1941. She made three appearances per day, at 3 pm, 6pm and 9 pm, on the Compton Theatrone, each segment 20 minutes long. She then moved to the Granada circuit in London, starting at their premier theatre in Tooting as an assistant organist. Chadwick toured with Granada around London and the provinces for four years. She continued to play in London throughout the Second World War, often to the sound of bombs dropping.

After the war Chadwick joined the Associated British Cinemas circuit and toured the country. She made her debut at the Savoy Cinema, Leicester, where she remained for two years. In August 1947, Chadwick broadcast on the Home service from the Ritz Cinema in Richmond and in December of the same year, she broadcast on the BBC Theatre Organ on the Light Programme, by which time she had been a cinema organist for eight years. She then turned to electronic organs, and started playing a Hammond organ at the Lyons' Corner House in Tottenham Court Road, London, replacing organist Ena Baga. On Chadwick's days off, Baga would deputise for her. Chadwick continued in this role for 14 months, before leaving London.

During the 1950s, while courting her future husband, Leonard Wiles, Chadwick went to view a pipe organ in a Shepherd's Bush pub, in west London. She started playing the two manual organ, with pipes going into the beer cellar, occasionally deputising for the regular organist. It was here that Chadwick was spotted and offered a job in Oldham, Lancashire.

Chadwick, with her husband, moved to Oldham and spent three years at the Market Hotel, before taking on the Magnet Hotel. Chadwick installed a Hammond RT3 organ, drawing in customers from as far as Blackpool and Halifax. During her time at the Magnet Hotel, Chadwick broadcast from the Odeon and Gaumont in Manchester, where she deputised for Stanley Tudor at the latter. After eight years at the Magnet, the couple took over the Gardner's Arms in Middleton for 12 months, before returning to the Magnet for a further three years. Chadwick then played the organ at the British Legion Club in Higher Blackley for 11 years, before she began to wind down her performing.

In the late 1960s and early 1970s Chadwick appeared as an early guest on the BBC radio programme The Organist Entertains. In 1977, Chadwick, along with Baga, represented women organists at the Odeon, Leicester Square, London, in celebration of the Queen's Silver Jubilee. The following year, Chadwick became the first woman to perform in concert for The North Wales Organ Society at the Metropole Hotel in Colwyn Bay. In July 1981, she accompanied Cerys Hughes-Taylor at the Gaumont State Theatre in Hammersmith, to an audience of 3,500 including Prince Charles and Lady Diana.

She recorded a number of LPs, and made recordings on the Gaumont, Manchester, the Christie organ at the Regal, Edmonton, and the Wurlitzer in the Free Trade Hall, Manchester. Chadwick played at the Hulme Hippodrome, where her recitals were recorded and broadcast by the BBC. Chadwick played many organs for meetings of theatre organ societies around the country as cinemas were disposing of their organs and redundant theatre organs were being installed by societies in village halls, church halls and private residences.

During the 1990s Chadwick continued to give concerts for societies at regional theatre organs such as the American Theatre Organ Society's Christie Theatre Organ at the Barry Memorial Hall, for the Mid Glamorgan Organ Society at the Lindsay Constitutional Club, for the Cinema Organ Society at the New Ritz ballroom Brighouse, and at the Clydebank Town Hall.

In April 2007 Chadwick, along with Len Rawle and Kevin Morgan, gave the reopening concert of the Granada Tooting Wurlitzer to an audience of over one thousand. Chadwick announced her retirement while seated at the console of the Compton/Christie organ in the Town Hall, Ossett, on 1 June 2008.

Chadwick's signature tune was called "Doreen", and composed by Tony Lowrey. She had over 200 broadcasters to her name and was nicknamed the "Princess of the Theatre Organ". She was the vice-president of the Lancastrian Theatre Organ Trust and President of the Cinema Organ Society.

== Personal life and death ==
Chadwick married Leonard Wiles (26 January 1908 – 5 November 2006) in 1951 in Ealing, west London, before the couple settled in the north of England in 1952. Wiles was a bandsman in the 4th Hussars, playing clarinet and saxophone. The couple settled in Alkrington, near Middleton in Lancashire.

Wiles died on 5 November 2006, aged 98. Chadwick died on 26 June 2014, aged 95. Nigel Ogden presented a tribute edition of The Organist Entertains devoted to her, which was broadcast on BBC Radio 2 in July 2014.
