= Wurlitzer theatre organs in the United Kingdom =

UK theatre organs

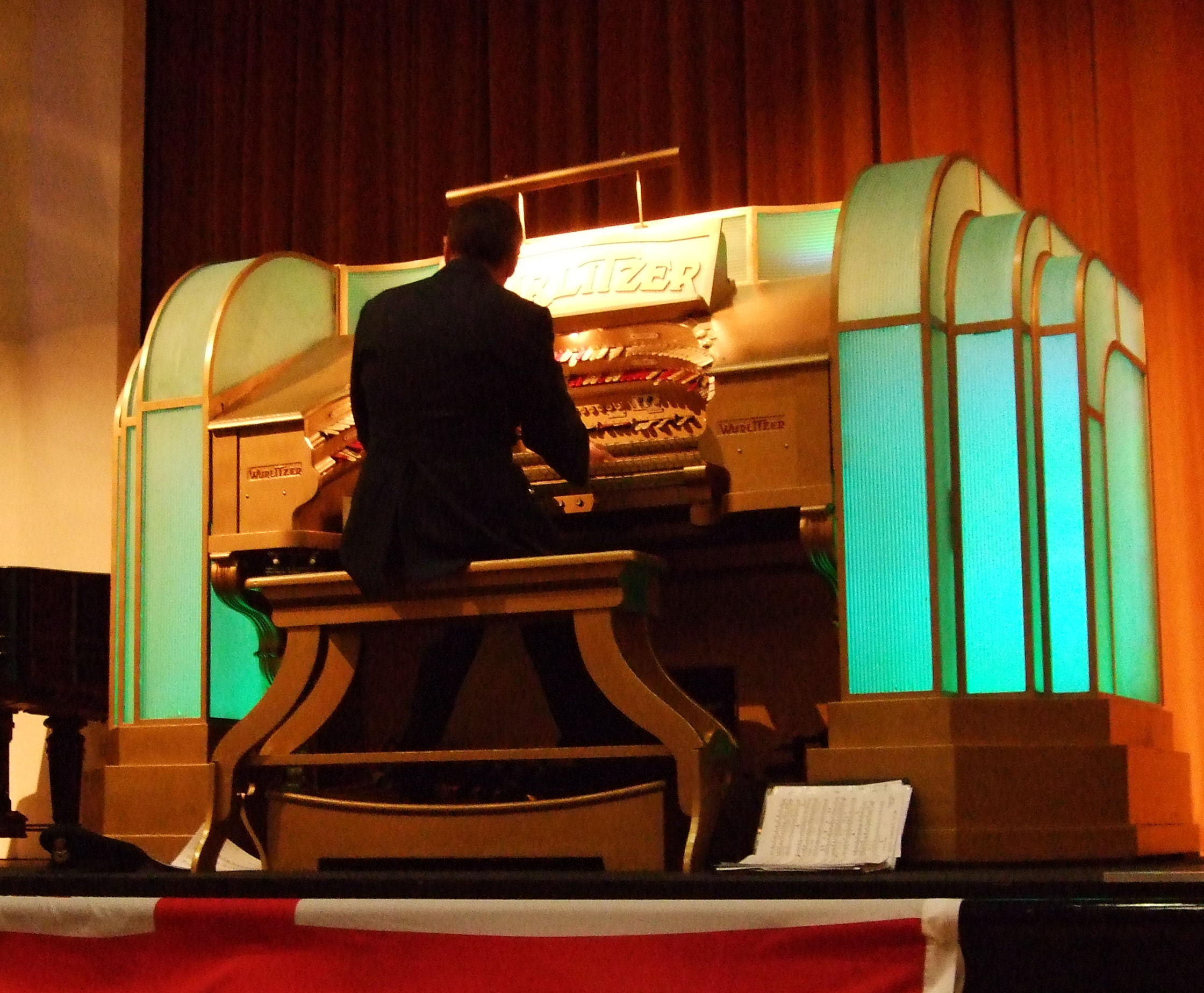
Wurlitzer at the Musical Museum, Brentford

A number of Wurlitzer theatre organs were imported and installed in the United Kingdom in the period from 1925 to just before the Second World War (1939–45).

The first Wurlitzer theatre organ shipped to the UK was dispatched on 1 December 1924, and shipped in via Southampton Docks. A very small, six-rank instrument, it was installed at the Picture House, Walsall, Staffordshire, where it opened on 26 January 1925. After a period in private ownership in Sedgley, also in Staffordshire, during the mid-1950s, it is now installed and operational in the Congregational Church in Beer, Devon.

The second Wurlitzer theatre organ to be opened in Great Britain was at the Palace Cinema in Tottenham, North London. This instrument was inaugurated on 6 April 1925. Like the Beer Wurlitzer it was a 2-manual, 6-rank instrument. This organ is now located at Rye College in East Sussex.

The Trocadero Elephant and Castle Wurlitzer was the largest organ ever shipped to the UK, installed in 1930 for the grand opening of the 3,400-seater cinema.

The Blackpool Opera House organ of 1939, designed by Horace Finch, was the last new Wurlitzer to be installed in the UK. The Granada, Kingston also received a Wurlitzer in or around 1939, but most of this came from an earlier installation in Edinburgh. This was the last Wurlitzer installation to be opened, with Reginald Dixon at the console.

Wurlitzers made regular radio broadcasts via the BBC, becoming stars themselves beside their organists. The more famous of these organs were at the Empire Cinema, London, and the Tower Ballroom, Blackpool, the latterly most regularly played by Reginald Dixon creating what became known as the "Blackpool sound". In the late 1960s the BBC acquired a Wurlitzer from the Empress Ballroom Blackpool, which was installed as the new BBC Theatre Organ at the BBC Playhouse studios in Manchester until the studios closed in 1986. It was introduced on 12 November 1970 as a gala performance edition of The Organist Entertains by Robin Richmond, with performances by Ernest Broadbent, Reginald Dixon and Reginald Porter Brown. The image of an elegantly dressed virtuoso cinema organist, sometimes rising up through the floor on a lift, was an iconic image of 1920s and 1930s Britain, parodied for example by Monty Python.

Many Wurlitzer organs have survived and are installed in private homes, town halls, concert halls and ballrooms throughout the country. The Cinema Organ Society has an extensive list of British cinema organs.

== List of Wurlitzers in the United Kingdom ==
Wurlitzer Organs in the United Kingdom
| Style | Date installed | Installation location | Size (Manual/ Rank) | Current status | Current location | Notes |
|---|---|---|---|---|---|---|
| 956, Style D | 1924 | Picture House, Walsall | 2/6 | Operational | Beer, Devon | First Wurlitzer shipped to the UK 2 Manual, 6 Rank instrument bought and installed for around £3,900. Shipped via Southampton Docks, opened end of January 1925 by Jack Courtnay. In run-up to World War 2, Wilfred Gregory became resident organist. Sold to Allan Hickling post-war; he installed it in Dormston House in Sedgley, Staffordshire. Deciding he wanted something bigger, he sold it to Arthur Thorn of Beer, Devon, who installed it in the local Congregational Church. The percussions and "toy counter" division were removed and re-cycled when the organ was installed in the church, since it was not considered necessary for church purposes. Since 2008 money has been raised to replace the missing percussion items and novelty effects and take the Beer Wurlitzer back to its former glory. The Beer Wurlitzer is in regular use for concerts and shows throughout the year. |
| Style 260 | 1926 | Plaza Lower Regent Street (Plaza Piccadilly Circus) | 3/15 | Operational | Dreamfactory, Degersheim, Switzerland | Second Wurlitzer imported to the UK but fourth to be playing. |
| Style D | 1925 | Palace Cinema in Tottenham, North London | 2/10 | Operational | Rye College, Rye, East Sussex | Second Wurlitzer installed in the UK. The same model as the Beer Wurlitzer, first played by organist Jack Courtnay on 6 April 1925. Sold to Rye College in 1957, with the console installed sideways-on a balcony above the school hall. Originally 2/6, later augmented to 2/10. In recent years "Friends of Rye Wurlitzer" have raised funds to move the organ's console onto its own lift rising from beneath the stage |
| Style F | 1925 | New Gallery Regent Street London | 2/8 | | Still in situ | Restored and still in situ although building is now a Burberry store. |
| | 1929 | Troxy Cinema, Stepney | 3/22 | Operational | Assembly Hall, Worthing, West Sussex | Largest Wurlitzer organ console in Europe. Owned by the National Organ Trust. Upgraded to an electric air pump system, programmable pre-sets, and a full pipe system. |
| Special | 1929 | Regal Cinema, Kingston upon Thames | 3/12 | Operational | Musical Museum, Brentford | In regular use for museum tours and for concerts. The organ is connected to a very rare Wurlitzer Automatic Roll Playing Cabinet, enabling the performances of many American Theatre Organists of the 1920s to be faithfully recreated |
| | 1930 | Trocadero cinema, Elephant and Castle, London | 4/25 | Operational | Troxy Commercial Road, Limehouse, London | Largest ever Wurlitzer shipped to the UK. Installed in 1930 for the grand opening of the 3,400-seater Trocadero Cinema at Elephant and Castle. When that building was demolished the organ was housed in the University of the South Bank for 25 years before it was decided it should be part of a live events venue once again, and it is now housed at Troxy (former Super Cinema now commercial events venue) in the heart of East London. Restoration and installation of the Wurlitzer in the Troxy began in January 2011 and took over four years to complete. |
| Special | 1937 | Gaumont State Cinema, Kilburn, London | 4/16 | Operational | Still in situ | Largest functioning Wurlitzer in a British cinema, though the building is now an evangelical church |
| Granada 2 | 1937 | Granada Theatre, Greenford | 3/8 | Operational | Scarborough Fair Collection | Used both for tea dances and regular concerts. English Horn, Tuba, Diapason, Tibia Clausa, Saxophone, Gamba, Gamba Celeste and Flute |
| Granada 1 | 1936 | Granada Theatre, Mansfield | 3/8 | Operational | Scarborough Fair Collection | Used both for tea dances and regular concerts. Style 'D' Trumpet, Diapason, Tibia Clausa, Clarinet, Violin, Violin Celeste, Vox Humana and Flute |
| Style H Special | 1931 | Granada cinema, Tooting | 4/14 | Intact but not operational | Still in Situ | After undergoing a lengthy restoration, played in public for the first time in 33 years |
| Model F | 1928 | Regent cinema, Dudley | 2/6 | Operational | Peterborough College | The task to install the Wurlitzer in the college and to restore it to first class condition was completed in March 1981, when the opening concert was performed by John Mann. The Organ Crew, as they were known, spent many hundreds of hours preparing for this event. |
| 2081, 200 Special | 1929 | City Cinema, Leicester | | Operational | Villa Marina Arcade, Douglas, Isle of Man | Signed out from the factory at Tonawanda on 25 November 1929, it was designed for the Marlborough Cinema in Holloway, London. Thought too small on arrival in UK, it was installed in the smaller City Cinema in Leicester, where it remained until 1957. In storage from 1957, bought privately by Councillor Allan Hickling to replace the Walsall organ, and latterly installed in Dormston House, Sedgley, Staffordshire. Here it became well known, played by organist Brian Sharp on BBC Radio 2 programme The Organist Entertains. Acquired by the Isle of Man Government in 1989, it became popular entertaining tourists at Summerland until its closure in 2004. The Wurlitzer has now been fully restored by organist Len Rawle, installed in the Villa Marina complex |
| | | Paramount, Leeds | 3/19 | Operational | Thursford Collection, Norfolk | |
| | | Paramount, Manchester | 4/20 | Operational | Town Hall, Stockport, Cheshire | Adopted by the Lancastrian Theatre Organ Trust, who held monthly Sunday concerts, from which they produced 24 LPs to create funds to preserve the instrument. After closure and a period in storage, installed in the Free Trade Hall, Manchester, where it remained until 1997. After the FTH was proposed for redevel, the instrument was again placed in storage from 1997. Installed in the Great Hall of Stockport Town Hall, opened in November 1999 |
| | | Gaumont, Manchester | 4/14 | Plays Daily via computer | Folly Farm, Pembrokeshire | After closure and proposed demolition of the Gaumont from 27 January 1974, the organ was bought by the Lancastrian Theatre Organ Trust. Loaned to Granada Studios, it was installed in the Baronial Hall, featuring during the studio tours on a daily basis. After closure of the tour, it was placed in storage for eight years, before sale to Paul Kirner of Compton Lodge Sapcote, who placed it on a ten-year loan to Folly Farm, where it started operations in 2008. |
| | | Trocadero Theatre, Liverpool | 2/6 | Operational | LTOT Theatre Organ Heritage Centre, Peel Green, Eccles | Moved to the Gaumont, Dingle, Liverpool in 1937. After closure, purchased by a private individual and subsequently purchased by Lancastrian Theatre Organ Trust in 2003. Now installed in the Theatre Organ Heritage Centre, Peel Green, Eccles. |
| | 1933 | Empire Music Hall, Edmonton, North London | 3/10 | Operational | St Albans Organ Theatre | Three-manual, ten-rank instrument, opened by American organist Don Baker, then regularly featured by the famous Granada team of top organists. Restored in 1992, now provides monthly concert demonstrations. An unusual feature of this instrument is the provision of a dedicated chamber for percussion, controlled by an additional expression pedal. The installation at St. Albans includes a Weber Duo-Art grand piano playable from the Wurlitzer console |
| | 1934 | Tower Ballroom, Blackpool | 3/14 | Operational | Still in Situ | After Reginald Dixon became resident in 1930, he quickly realised that the existing instrument was too weak for the ballroom. After lobbying management, they agreed the installation of a new instrument, designed by Dixon himself. Known as the "Wonder Wurlitzer", it became operational from early 1935. Wurlitizer presented Dixon with a gold watch after the first performance, and its regular performances on the BBC became known as the "Blackpool sound". The same basic instrument installation still exists in the ballroom today, with a few modern updates |
| | 1934 | Unknown cinema, United States | 3/8 | Operational | Town Hall, Burton-upon-Trent | Originally installed in a cinema in the United States, it moved to the Forum cinema in Wythenshawe, Manchester, and opened by Kevin Buckley. On its closure, stored, then installed in the Town Hall, Burton-upon-Trent, where it is still in operation. Original Clarinet rank replaced by Conacher-built Trumpet. Recent additions are Sub-Octave, Octave, Great to Solo, and Quint and Sub-Tierce Great to Solo Couplers with digital piano available on pedals and manuals. |
| | 1937 | Gaumont, Oldham, Lancashire | | Operational | Victoria Hall, Saltaire | Opened on 14 June 1937, with Jack Fenner at the console. Bought by the Cinema Organ Society after the Gaumont closed on 2 December 1961, it was installed four years later at Dale Hall in Hampsthwaite near Harrogate, West Riding of Yorkshire, opening on 26 February 1966. Removed on 3 December 1988, it was then installed for a short time at the Trinity Arts Centre, Pudsey, Leeds, where it was opened on 30 June 1991. Removed in December 1994, it moved to the Ritz Ballroom in Brighouse, a former cinema, in 1995. Removed in 2006, it was placed in storage until installed in the GradeII* listed Victorian Hall in Saltaire. |
| | 1937 | Granada Cinema, Woolwich, South London | 3/9 | Operational | Neuadd Pendre, Tywyn, Gwynedd, North Wales | Opened in 1937 by Reginal Dixon. Bought by John Smallwood of Tywyn, who arranged its permanent loan to the people of the town through the Tywyn Town Council. |
| | 1939 | Opera House Theatre, Blackpool | 3/13 | Operational | Still in situ | The last new commissioned Wurlitzer installed in the UK. Designed by Horace Finch |
| | 1939 | Granada cinema, Kingston upon Thames | 3/10 | | | Originally installed in the Picture House Cinema, Edinburgh. This was a Gaumont Theatre. The original Model F format was altered and enlarged to 10 ranks and three manuals Manual III played percussion and two pipe ranks. Last Wurlitzer installation to be opened; Reginald Dixon was at the console |
| | 2007 | East Sussex National Hotel, Uckfield, East Sussex | | Operational | In situ | Assembled from imported second hand parts from the United States. Claimed to be the largest Wurlitzer in Europe. |
| | 1937 | Ritz Stockport | 3/19 | Operational | Pollokshaws Burgh Hall, Glasgow | Moved from Clydebank Town Hall in 2008 Originally 3/8 and the same model as Ritz Luton and Richmond as designed by Harold Ramsay and featuring the rare Wurlitzer French Trumpet. Now 3/19. Operated by the Scottish Cinema Organ Trust. |
| | 02/02/1938 | Granada Cinema Welling | 3/19 (originally 3/8) | Operational | Woking Leisure Centre | Opened officially by Harold Robinson-Cleaver. When the Granada closed, the organ was purchased by the London and South of England Chapter of the American Theatre Organ Society. After several years in storage, in 1995 it was painstakingly installed by a dedicated band of enthusiasts in what is now called "The Wurlitzer Hall" at Woking Leisure Centre. Extra ranks of pipes have been added since, bringing the total to 19. |

== See also ==
- Wurlitzer
- Theatre organ
