= Phil Kelsall =

Phil Kelsall MBE ALCM
- Born: Philip Julian Kelsall; 13 July 1956 (age 70); Warrington, Lancashire, England
- Occupations: Theatre organist
- Years active: 1977–present
- Website: https://www.philkelsall.co.uk/

Philip Julian Kelsall MBE ALCM (born 13 July 1956) is an English theatre organist who has been principal organist at the Blackpool Tower Ballroom since 1977. Born in Warrington, Lancashire, he was inspired to learn the instrument by Reginald Dixon (“Mr Blackpool”), and was initially appointed as organist for the Tower Circus band aged 18 in 1975; he also deputised for Ernest Broadbent in the Ballroom itself. This followed his attending Rossall School in Fleetwood, an independent day and boarding school where he was taught by Robin Proctor, who subsequently became Director of Music at Cheltenham College. After Ernest Broadbent's retirement, he was appointed Tower organist in 1977.

Noted for his distinctive Dixon-inspired "Blackpool style" of playing, he has made numerous appearances on television and radio playing the Tower's 1935 Wurlitzer organ, especially on the long-running BBC Radio 2 programme The Organist Entertains, which he has occasionally guest presented. He has also appeared on Strictly Come Dancing, Sam on Sunday, Friday Night is Music Night and Play It Again. During the Tower's closed season, Kelsall plays the Thursford Collection's Wurlitzer for their annual Christmas Spectacular shows. He was appointed MBE in the June 2010 Queen's Birthday Honours list.

In 2013, he released his 59th album on the Tower Ballroom Wurlitzer. On 18 June 2017, a special concert hosted by theatre organist Nigel Ogden was held to celebrate Kelsall's 40th year as Tower Ballroom Organist.
