= Musaire =

British theremin player and entertainer

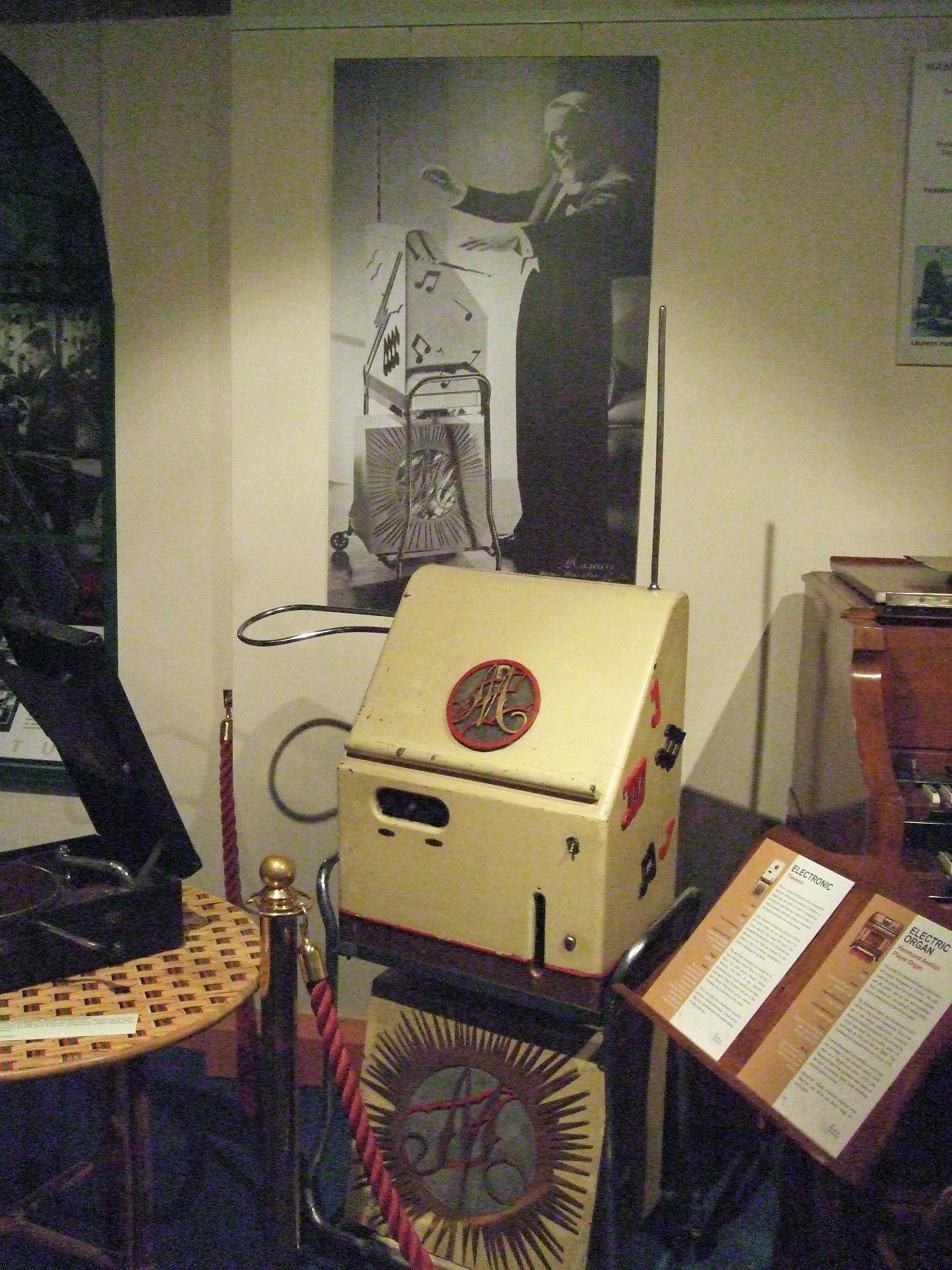
Musaire's theremin at the Musical Museum, Brentford

Joseph Forrest Whiteley (16 March 1894 – 27 February 1984), who performed as Musaire, was a British theremin player and entertainer.

He was born in Leeds, England, but moved to New Brunswick, Canada with his parents as a child. In the First World War he served in the Canadian Tank Corps, and afterwards performed with the billing "The Harry Lauder of the Canadian Tanks". He also worked for a piano manufacturing company, but in 1932 started performing on variety bills as Musaire, playing what he called "Music from the Air" with a customised theremin.

As well as providing demonstrations by playing brief pieces of music without touching the instrument, often confounding his audience, he also produced sound effects such as imitations of an airplane take-off and a ship's horn blast. He accompanied his playing with humorous commentary and occasional songs, and sometimes performed with a full orchestra. He also demonstrated the instrument in schools, and on television programmes in the 1950s and 1960s.

Whiteley became vice-president of the British Music Hall Society. He died in London in 1984, aged 89.

His theremin is currently displayed at the Musical Museum in Brentford.
