= Granada, Tooting =

Grade I listed hall in Tooting, London

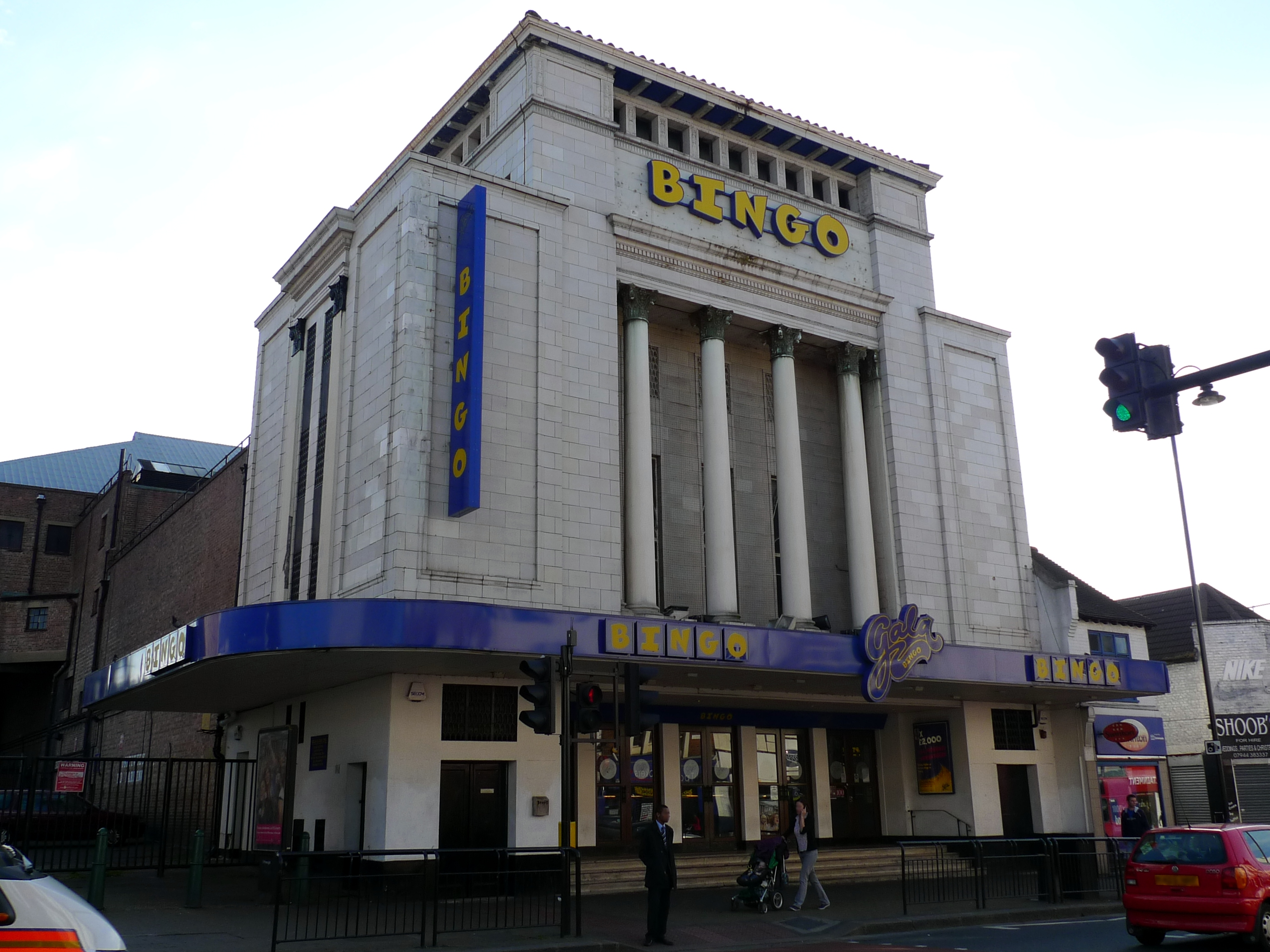
- Interactive map of the Granada, Tooting area

General information
- Architectural style: Art Deco
- Location: London, SW17
- Coordinates: 51°25′36″N 0°9′59″W
- Construction started: 1931

Design and construction
- Architect: Cecil Massey
- Other designers: Theodore Komisarjevsky

Buzz Bingo, Tooting (formerly Gala Bingo and the Granada Tooting cinema) is a Grade I listed building in Tooting, an area in the London borough of Wandsworth, England.

Originally built as one of the great luxurious Art Deco cinemas of the 1930s, it is still considered by many to be the most spectacular cinema in Britain. In his 1966 guide to London's buildings, the architectural critic Ian Nairn said of it, "miss the Tower of London if you have to, but don't miss this". In 2000 it became the first Grade I listed 1930s cinema and in 2015 was selected as an asset of community value.

== History ==
The building was first opened as the Granada, Tooting in 1931. It was designed by the cinema and theatre architect Cecil A. Massey for Sidney Bernstein, as part of his Granada cinema chain. The interior was by the Russian theatre director and designer, Theodore Komisarjevsky, who also designed the Granada Cinema, Woolwich.

Construction had begun in May 1930 and was completed by September the following year. An opening ceremony was held on 7 September 1931 to much local acclaim, more than 2000 patrons had to be turned away due to limited space. It included a performance by trumpeters from The Life Guards and Alex Taylor on the cinema's Wurlitzer organ. The opening films that night were Monte Carlo and the British short film Two Crowded Hours. Double-features like this one were the main component of the Granada's programming. Variety shows would also supplement the screening schedule, including theatre and music performances as well as a small circus up until 1934.

Through the 1940s and 1950s the Granada became more important as a local venue in Wandsworth, attracting talent from further afield. Artists who performed there included Jerry Lee Lewis, Frank Sinatra, The Walker Brothers, The Rolling Stones and on 1 June 1965 The Beatles performed two sold-out sets. The final artist to perform here would eventually be the Bee Gees on 28 April 1968. From 1970 the cinema's organ would be featured on the BBC Radio 2 programme The Organist Entertains. Declining attendance throughout the 1960s meant that by 1971 the cinema was only receiving 600 patrons per week. Concerned that this would lead Granada to close and demolish the building, the Wandsworth local council applied for listed status. On 28 July 1972 the cinema received Grade II* listed status. Heavy storms in July 1973 led to the flooding of the cinema, damaging the organ in the process. This, coupled with the declining viewership, led to the closing of the cinema on 10 November 1973. The final films shown were The Man Called Noon and Perfect Friday.

The building would lie unused for almost three years until it was reopened on 14 October 1976 as the Granada Bingo Club, Tooting. Granada would continue to manage the club until May 1991 when it was taken over by Gala Bingo (now Gala Coral Group Ltd) and renamed the Gala Bingo Club Tooting.

On 5 October 2000, the building was relisted as a Grade I listed building, making it one of three such former cinemas in the UK. It remains the only Grade I cinema of its style. Although the organ had been repaired in 1984 it had remained in relative disuse until 22 April 2007 when a concert was held featuring it. This was the first such concert since the 1970s and was given by Doreen Chadwick, along with Len Rawle and Kevin Morgan to an audience of over one thousand. More storm flooding on 20 July 2007 damaged the organ chamber and console once again. Following a year long campaign by local resident Dan Watkins in December 2015, the bingo hall was listed as an asset of community value.

== Bibliography ==
- The Granada Theatres, Allen Eyles pp. 42–49 (Cinema Theatre Association, 1998) ISBN 0-85170-680-0
