= St Catherine's Church, Pontypridd =

St Catherine's, Pontypridd
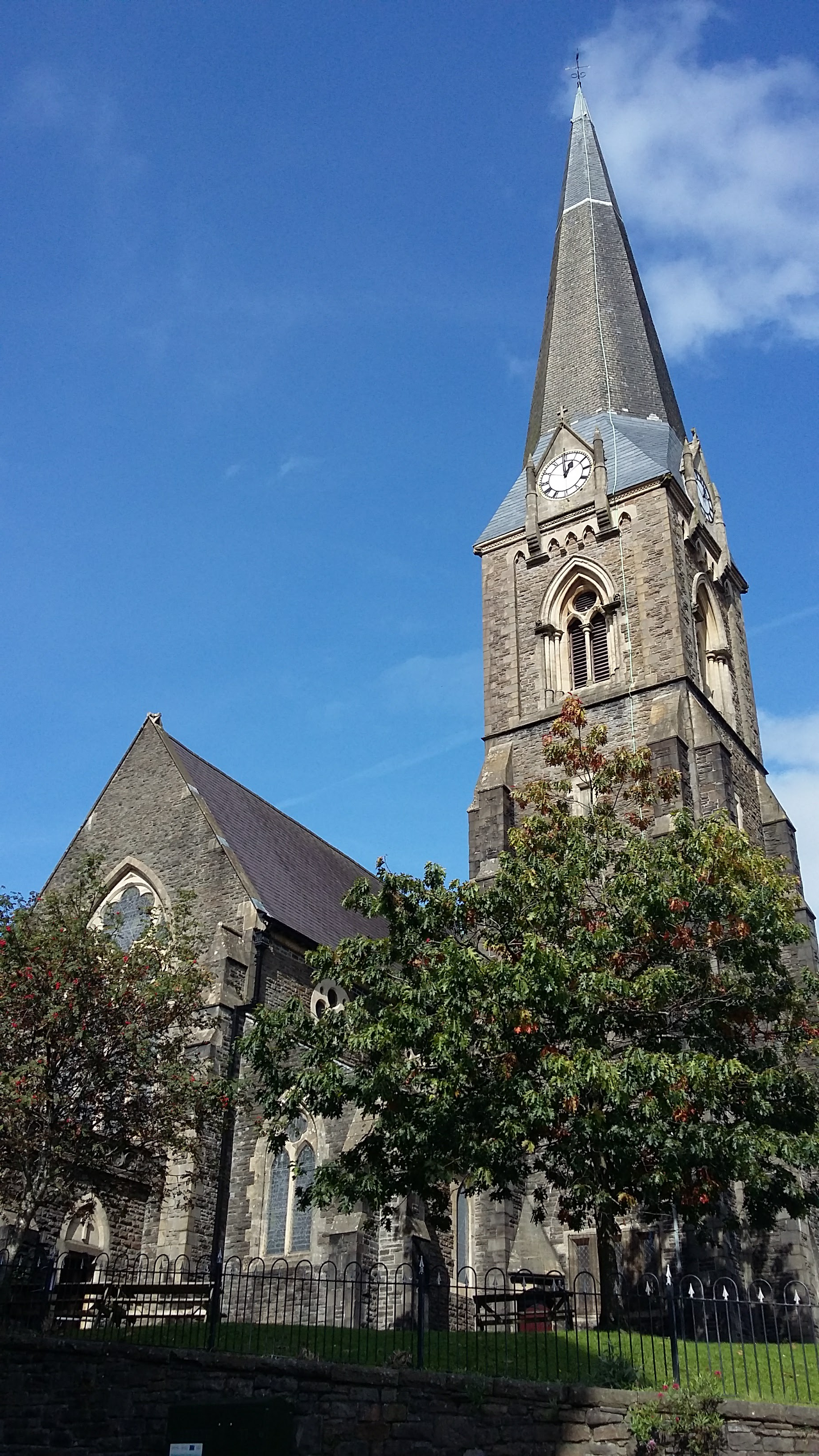
- St Catherine's in 2017
- St Catherine's, Pontypridd
- 51.6025°N 3.3422°W
- Denomination: Church in Wales

History
- Consecrated: 7 September 1869

Architecture
- Functional status: Active
- Heritage designation: Grade II*
- Designated: 26 February 2001
- Architect: John Norton
- Style: Geometric
- Groundbreaking: 1866

Specifications
- Materials: stone

Administration
- Diocese: Llandaff
- Deanery: Pontypridd
- Parish: Pontypridd St Catherine

St Catherine's Church, Pontypridd is a large listed parish church in the town of Pontypridd in South Wales. It is part of the Diocese of Llandaff in the Church in Wales. It is now part of the Parish of Pontypridd, which joined the Pontypridd and Ynysybwl Anglican Churches together to form one large Parish.

== History ==
The church was built in response to the growing population of Pontypridd, which had swelled as the town industrialised in the 19th century. By the middle decades of the 1800s, the town had about 5000 inhabitants. Although eight nonconformist chapels and a synagogue had opened, there was still no Anglican church: the nearest was St Mary's in Glyntaff, which was swiftly becoming too small and too far away. A site for the church which would become St Catherine's was donated by the Revd. G. Thomas in 1866.

The church was designed by John Norton. It was a development of the design of St David's Church in Neath, which Norton had designed in 1864–1866. The interior was influenced by the design by George Edmund Street for the church of St James the Less, Pimlico, recently completed in 1861. The church building was completed in 1870, but an extra aisle was added in 1885, and the clock faces were installed during a restoration by Kempson & Fowler in 1890. A north vestry was added in 1915. In 1919 Giles Gilbert Scott modified the chancel, whitewashing the interior walls and adding new stalls and a reredos. In 1933 a west porch was added.

There is much stained glass in the church: most significantly the five windows in the north aisle dating from 1901 to 1912, one of which is signed by R. J. Newberry of London. There is a memorial window from the First World War, dated 1923.

On 8 June 1937, organist Doreen Chadwick commenced a series of organ recitals which were broadcast on BBC Radio from the church. At 18 years old, she became the youngest female organist to broadcast straight recitals. Chadwick gave her second recital from the church on 21 May 1938.

The church became listed in 2001. It received a £200,000 overhaul in 2005. In 2016, a new lighting and heating system was installed, along with repairs to the spire, using a grant from the Heritage Lottery Fund, the Welsh Church Act Fund and CADW. The church is heavily involved with the local community, with a food bank, a debt advice centre and a café operating there.

The church hosted the BBC television programme Songs of Praise on 15 October 2017.

== Location ==
The church is sited prominently on a hill surrounded by its own graveyard, on the corner of Gelliwastad Road and Upper Church Street. St Catherine's has long been a focal point in the town. In 2005, there was a dispute between the church and the local authority over the erection of a new office building and a 326 space car park beside the church, which was built as part of a regeneration scheme. Some local people felt that the new building would spoil the view from the south, which the church has long dominated. The new office block and car park were completed in 2008.
