= Len Rawle =

Welsh organ builder and organist

Len Rawle MBE (4 January 1938 – 14 November 2023) was a Welsh organ builder and organist. A London College of Music graduate, he was particularly noted for his restoration of Wurlitzer theatre organs, such as at Harrow, Tooting and Woking.

== Early life ==
Leonard George Rawle was born in Tonypandy, South Wales to Thomas Leslie (Les) Rawle, a grocery store manager, and Edith, a pianist and singer. Rawle learned the piano at the age of four. He also played the recorder and violin at school. In 1945, Rawle took his first piano music examinations at the London College of Music in Cardiff, before setting his sights on the organ after initially hearing Sandy MacPherson playing the organ at the Methodist Central Hall, Tonypandy.

In 1948, the family moved to South Ruislip. Rawle attended Lady Banks Junior School before going to the Bourne Secondary School. He continued to have music lessons from Martin David at the Guildhall School of Music, and participated in local concerts and festivals, such as at the Ealing Music Festival, judged by Antony Hopkins. Upon reaching piano grade 8, Rawle was then eligible to study organ playing. He practised the organ at St Paul's Church in Ruislip Manor.

In 1959, his parents installed the UK's first residence organ in the purpose built family home, named Wurlitzer Lodge, on Doncaster Drive in Northolt. The installation of the Wurlitzer organ, which originated from the Granada Theatre, Wandsworth, was complete on 30 October 1960, when an opening concert took place.

Rawle's father, Les, was responsible for tuning and maintaining the Christie Organ in the Regal, Edmonton. When the Regal closed, the management offered Les the organ, which in turn was donated to the American Theatre Organ Society and installed in the Memorial Hall, Barry, South Wales; Rawle often played there.

== Career ==
After school, Rawle attended the Acton Technical College. However, he did not complete his studies and, instead, pursued a career in insurance at the London and Lancashire Insurance Company. He worked there for two years, from 1952, before being called up for National Service and posted to Aldershot Garrison in Hampshire in 1954 for his basic training. At Aldershot, Rawle focused on clerical and musical duties, including playing at the battalion churches and passing out parades. He would also play, on a voluntary basis, the Wurlitzer Organ at the Ritz Aldershot on a Saturday morning, for the Children's Matinee, and the Compton organ at the Empire Cinema on a Sunday.

After demobilisation, having returned to his work at the London and Lancashire Insurance Company, Rawle played at the Saturday Children's Matinee at the Ritz, Richmond, at the Commodore Cinema, Hammersmith and the Regal Kingston.

Rawle was on the first radio programme of The Organist Entertains, broadcast on BBC Radio 2 on 11 June 1969. In 1973, he appeared in the TV documentary film Metro-Land, written and narrated by Sir John Betjeman. Rawle performed "Chattanooga Choo Choo" and "The Varsity Drag", the latter a song which would have been popular when Betjeman was a young man.

In 1971, Rawle attended the Annual Music Trade Fair in London, and took an interest in the Yamaha stand, where he was approached by a representative of Kemble Pianos. He was offered the position of musical director of Kemble (Organ Sales), a role he would continue in until his retirement.

Rawle was responsible for establishing the Yamaha organ dealer network and Yamaha Music Schools in the UK. He gave numerous concerts and workshops in the US, Australia and Europe. In May 2001, he played on "Western New York's mightiest Wurlitzer theater pipe organ" in Buffalo, New York.

Rawle was particularly noted for his restoration of Wurlitzer theatre organs. He maintained the Wurlitzer organ in Woking, and previously maintained several other Wurlitzer organs, such as those at the Gaumont State Cinema, Kilburn, and the former organ of the Empire, Leicester Square, which he later installed in his Chorleywood home.

Rawle was involved in a £40,000 project to restore the Granada Tooting Wurlitzer organ, described as "one of the most significant restoration projects in the UK". In April 2007, Rawle, along with Doreen Chadwick and Kevin Morgan, gave the reopening concert to an audience of over one thousand. However, some months later, the organ suffered a flood, rendering it inoperable.

Rawle was a member of both the Theatre Organ Club and the Cinema Organ Society. Rawle and his father founded the London and South of England Chapter of The American Theatre Organ Society.

== Personal life and death ==
Rawle married Judith Anne Rodgers (born 1939) on 12 September 1964, in Sevenoaks. The couple had three children, Elizabeth, Richard and Georgina. The family settled in Berry Lane, Chorleywood, Hertfordshire, where Rawle built his own house, Tonawanda, and installed a 4-manual, 20-rank Wurlitzer organ, previously at the Empire, Leicester Square. (Tonawanda is a town in New York where all of the Wurlitzer organs were produced). The organ was officially opened in June 1968 by Gerald Shaw. However, the instrument was sold to a fellow enthusiast in 2015 to be restored and installed in a new purpose-built location in Suffolk.

As a child, Rawle enjoyed visiting Northolt Airport to watch and study the aeroplanes; he would construct balsa wood model aeroplane kits. In the 1980s, Rawle took flying lessons with the London School of Flying at Elstree, obtaining his licence shortly afterwards. For a time, he owned a Cessna plane.

Rawle was appointed a Member of the Order of the British Empire in 2012.

Rawle died on 14 November 2023, aged 85.
