= Opera House Theatre, Blackpool =

UK theatre (opened 1889)

Coordinates: 53.8171°N 3.0509°W

Opera House Theatre
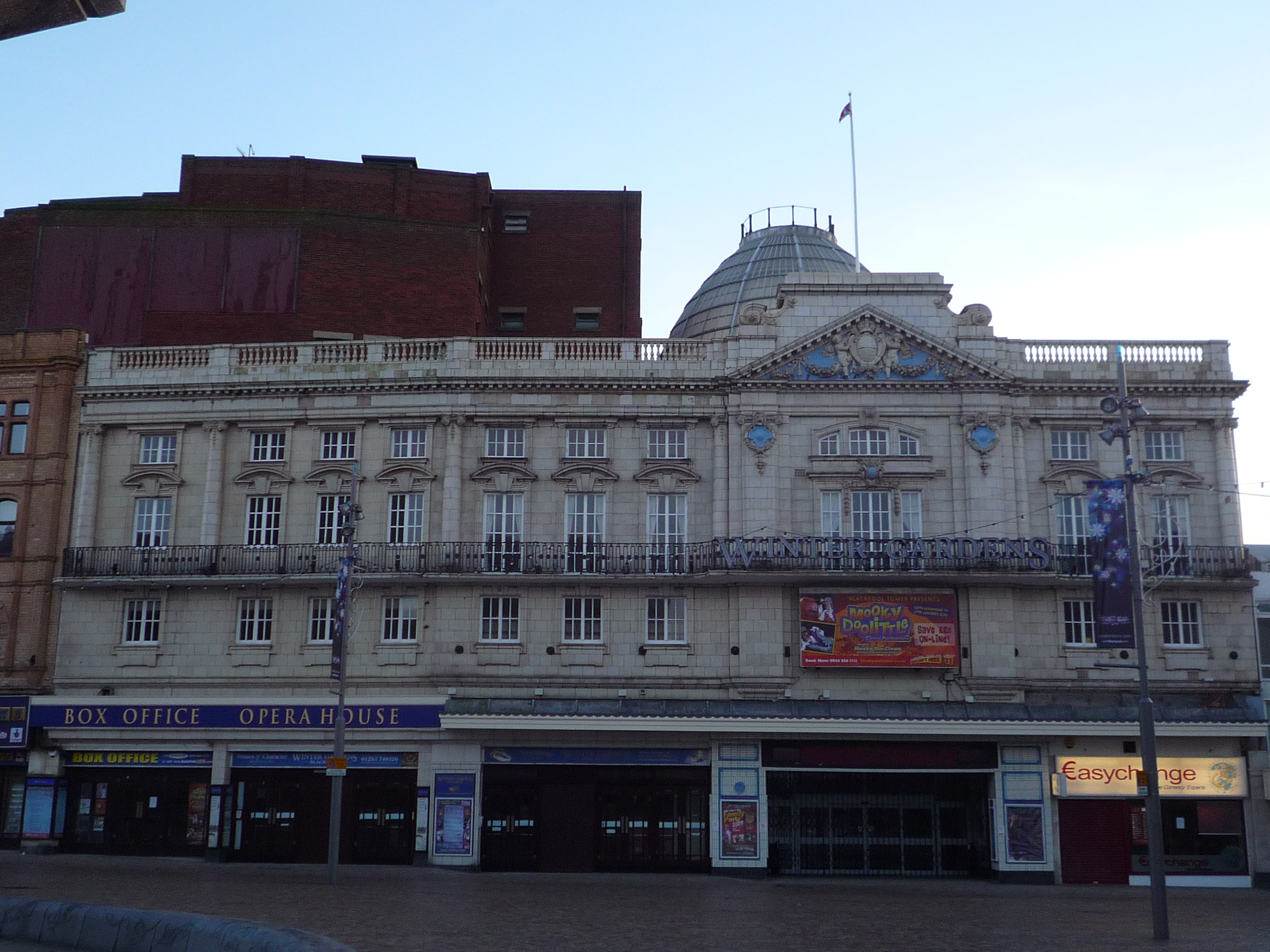
- Opera House theatre entrance (c. 2008)
- Interactive map of Opera House Theatre
- Former names: Her Majesty's Opera House (1889–1938)
- Address: 97 Church St; Blackpool FY1 1HL England
- Owner: Blackpool Council
- Operator: Crown Leisure Ltd.
- Capacity: 2,812
- Type: Provincial
- Designation: Listed Building Grade II*

Construction
- Groundbreaking: 19 October 1888
- Opened: 10 June 1889
- Renovated: 1910–11; 1938–39; 1987; 2008
- Cost: £9,098 ($1.02 million in 2025 dollars)
- Architect: Frank Matcham

The Opera House Theatre is a theatre in Blackpool, Lancashire, England. It is located within the Winter Gardens, a large entertainment complex in the town centre and originally opened in 1889, although it has been rebuilt twice, in 1910 and 1939.

As part of the Winter Gardens, the theatre is a Grade II* Listed Building. It is operated by Crown Leisure Ltd, on behalf of Blackpool Council, who purchased the property from Leisure Parcs Ltd as part of a £40 million deal in 2010.

With seating for 2,812 on three levels, it is the third largest theatre in the United Kingdom after the Hammersmith Apollo and the Edinburgh Playhouse.

== History ==
The present theatre is the third such structure to have been built on the site.

The original building, completed in 1889, at a cost of £9,098 was designed by the theatre architect Frank Matcham, who also designed the nearby Grand Theatre and the Tower Ballroom. It had 2,500 seats, and was named Her Majesty’s Opera House. The first performance at the theatre was Gilbert and Sullivan's new Savoy opera, The Yeomen of the Guard on 10 June 1889.

The theatre's seating capacity was soon considered insufficient and in November 1910 was closed for reconstruction. The new and larger building, by architects Mangnall and Littlewood, formally opened just nine months later. However, in 1938 the second Opera House was demolished and the present theatre opened in 1939. It was designed in a modernist style with a sweepingly curved proscenium. A Wurlitzer organ was installed to the design of Horace Finch and he and Reginald Dixon played on the opening night. It was the last new Wurlitzer organ to be installed in the UK and it is still in regular use today. The new Opera House was opened on 14 July 1939 by actress Jessie Matthews and her husband, actor and director Sonnie Hale. The first performance followed – the revue Turned Out Nice Again, starring George Formby.

The first Royal Variety Performance to be held outside London was staged at the Opera House on 13 April 1955. Compèred by Jack Hylton and held in the presence of the Queen and the Duke of Edinburgh. Performers included Arthur Askey, Morecambe and Wise, The Crazy Gang, Reginald Dixon at the Wurlitzer organ, Joan Regan, Alma Cogan, George Formby, Beryl Grey, John Field, Flanagan and Allen and Charlie Cairoli.

On 7 December 2009, the 81st Royal Variety Performance was again staged at the theatre in the presence of The Queen, and compèred by Peter Kay. The performers included Lady Gaga, Michael Bublé, Alexandra Burke, Diversity, Hal Cruttenden, Miley Cyrus, Whoopi Goldberg, Adam Hills, Bob Golding as Eric Morecambe, Les 7 Doights de la Main, Katherine Jenkins, Jason Manford, Pilobolus Dancers, Mika, Bette Midler, André Rieu, Faryl Smith, Paul Zerdin – also the Heavy Cavalry and Cambrai Band, the cast of Sister Act the Musical, with Whoopi Goldberg and the cast of Here Come the Girls; Anastacia, Lulu and Chaka Khan.

The Opera House Theatre hosts many theatrical performances in addition to variety shows and music concerts. It serves as a stage during the Rebellion Festival, a punk rock festival held at the Winter Gardens each year.

== Capacity ==
The current capacity is 2,812 consisting of 1,400 stall seats, 758 balcony seats and 654 seats in the circle.
