= Musical Museum, Brentford =

Music museum in London, England

Coordinates: 51.4879°N 0.2931°W

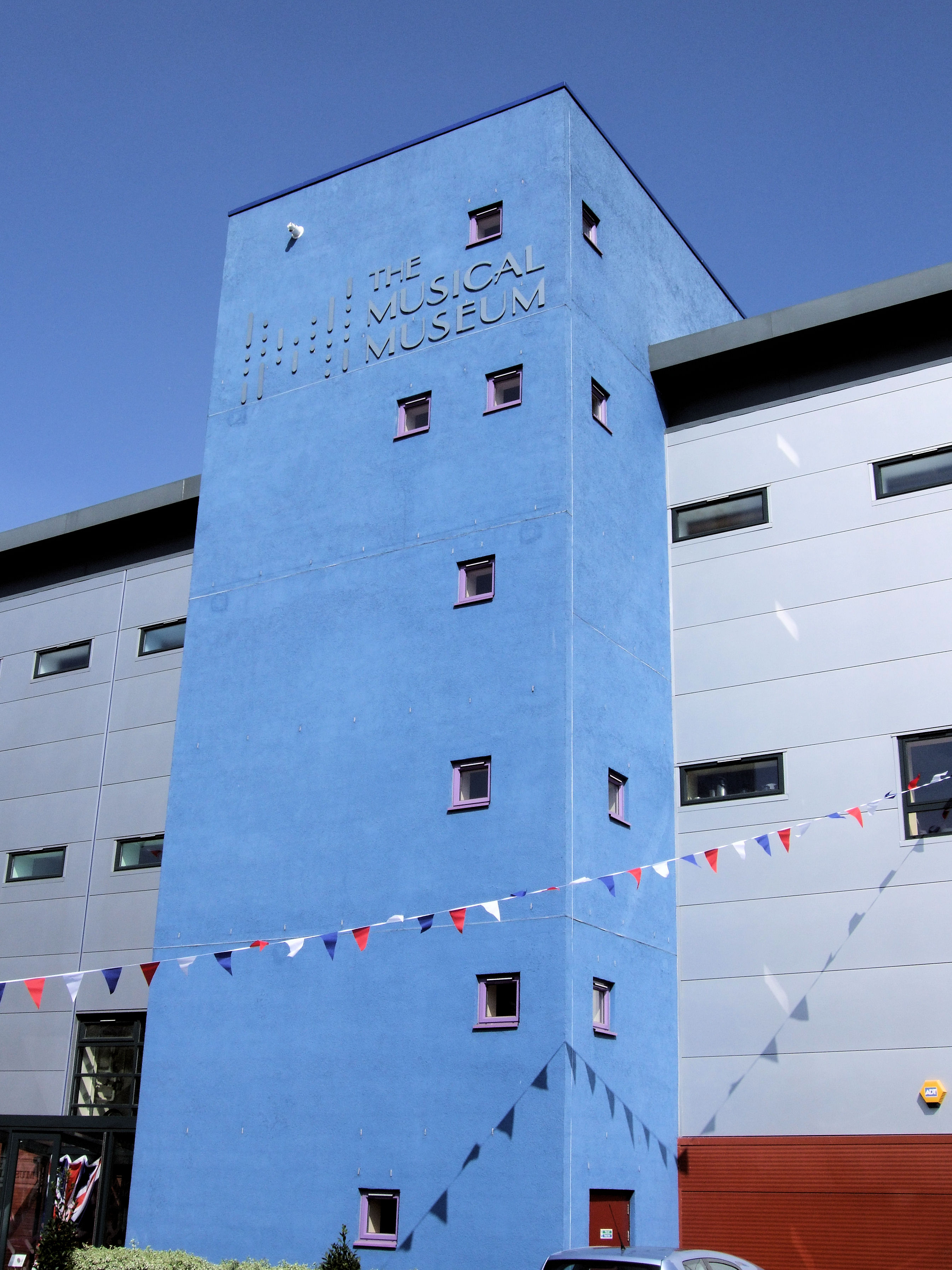
The Musical Museum

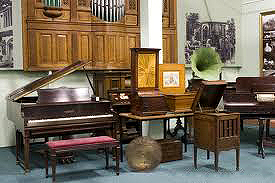
A sample of The Musical Museum's instrument collection

The Musical Museum is a charity, museum and concert venue located in Brentford, west London, a few minutes' walk from Kew Bridge railway station. Its stated purpose is to conserve, preserve, and develop nationally important collections related to the history of music reproduction; inform, engage and entertain the public regarding the evolution of music reproduction; and conserve, preserve, promote and present the theatre pipe organ as an instrument with a significant role in the development of light music on radio and in the cinema and as a musical art form.

The Musical Museum features a significant collection of self-playing musical instruments, and one of the world's largest collections of historic musical rolls. The museum houses rare working specimens of player pianos, orchestrions, reed organs, and violin players. The largest exhibits include a fully restored Wurlitzer theatre organ (attached to a roll-playing mechanism and Steinway grand piano) and a 12-rank roll-playing residence pipe organ.

The instruments and exhibits are arranged in four main galleries. The building also houses a concert hall, which doubles as a cinema, seating up to 240 people, and a cafe.

Mostly run by volunteers, the museum is open on Fridays, Saturdays, Sundays and Bank Holidays. Guided tours are available, which include live demonstrations of the instruments. The museum also stages regular concerts and events, dances and screenings of both contemporary and silent films, often featuring their Wurlitzer Cinema Organ. Many of their events are broadcast live to their YouTube channel, Musical Museum Live.

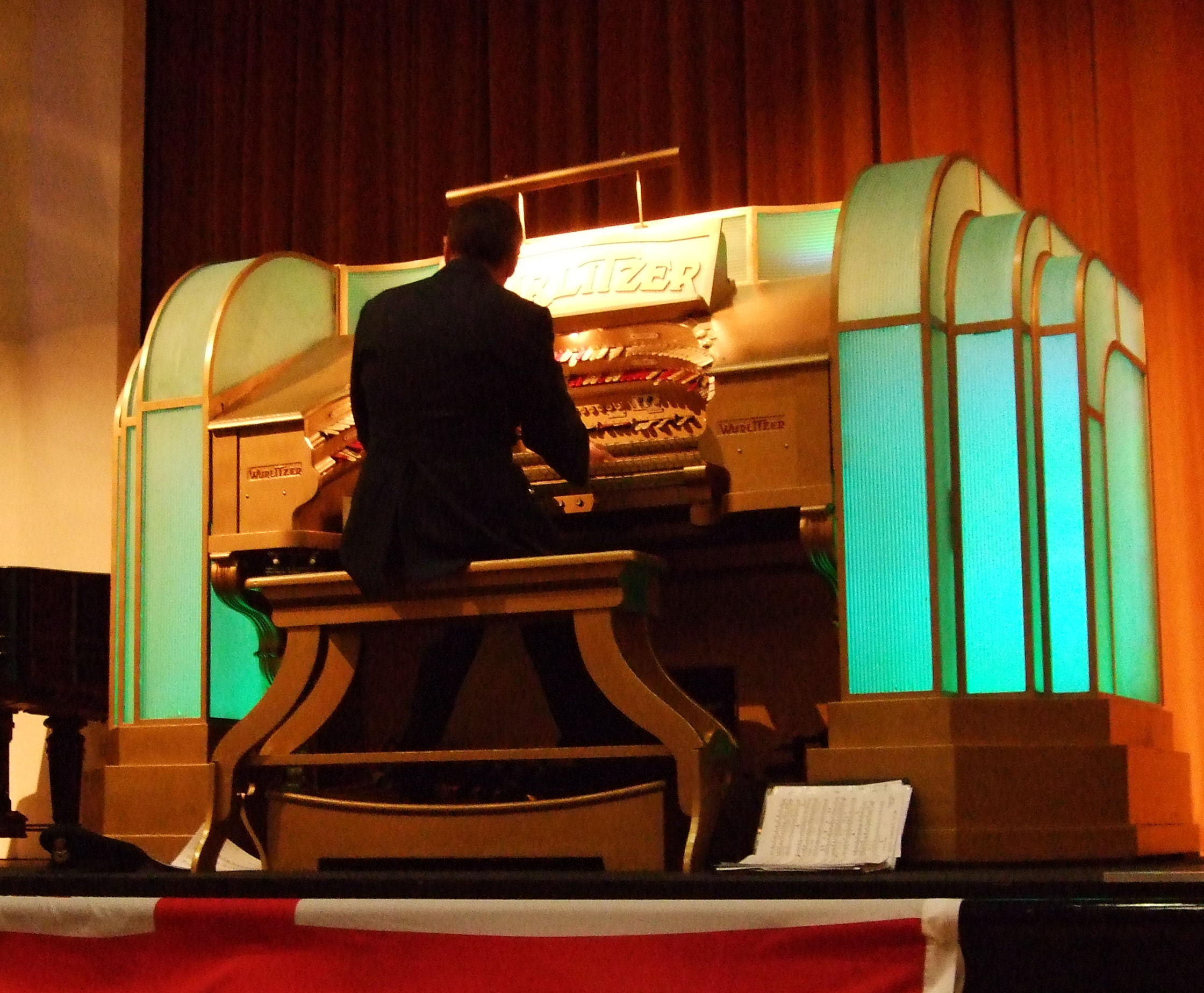
Wurlitzer, Brentford Musical Museum, London

== History ==
The Museum was founded in 1963 by Frank Holland (1910–1989) as The British Piano Museum, who believed that self-playing musical instruments should be preserved and played. In 1975, he was interviewed for the TV programme Going Places, in which he reminisced about reading an article about there being about eight-hundred abandoned churches in London, so he decided to find a suitable one to house the instruments, St. George's in Brentford. He later wrote of his experiences in the book A Boxful of Rolls.

The Museum moved to a new purpose-built building nearby in 2009.

In September 2024, the museum opened the Korg Gallery, which contains a collection of synthesizers and other electronic musical instruments.

== The Korg Gallery ==
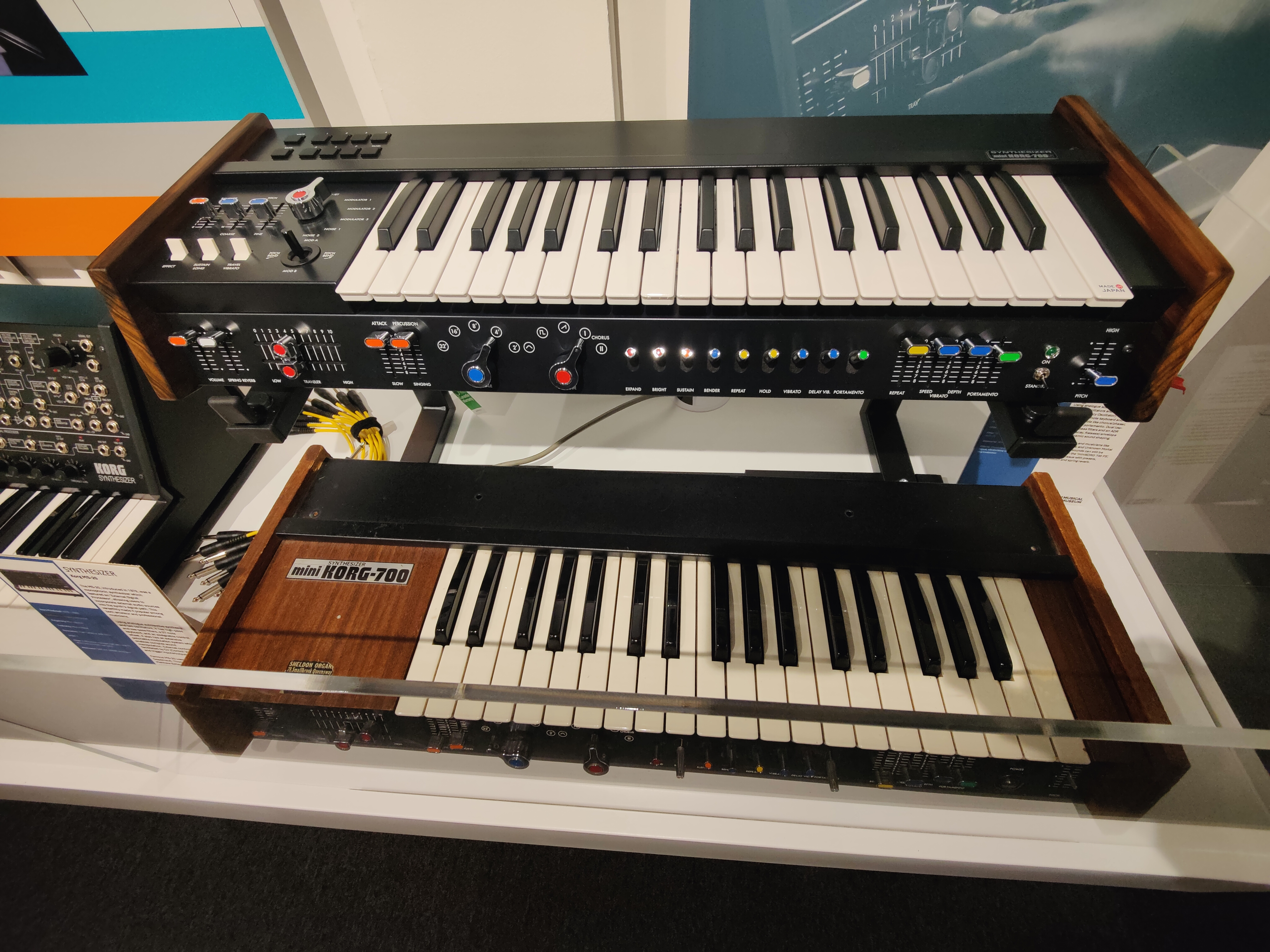
Korg miniKORG 700 original (bottom) and reissue (top)

One of the four galleries in the museum contains a collection of electronic musical instruments whose original production dates from the 1970s through to the present day. This room is known as the Korg Gallery and its exhibits include various vintage synthesizers made by the Japanese company, Korg, such as a miniKORG 700 and a rare, wall-mounted Korg MS-20 Blackboard synthesizer.

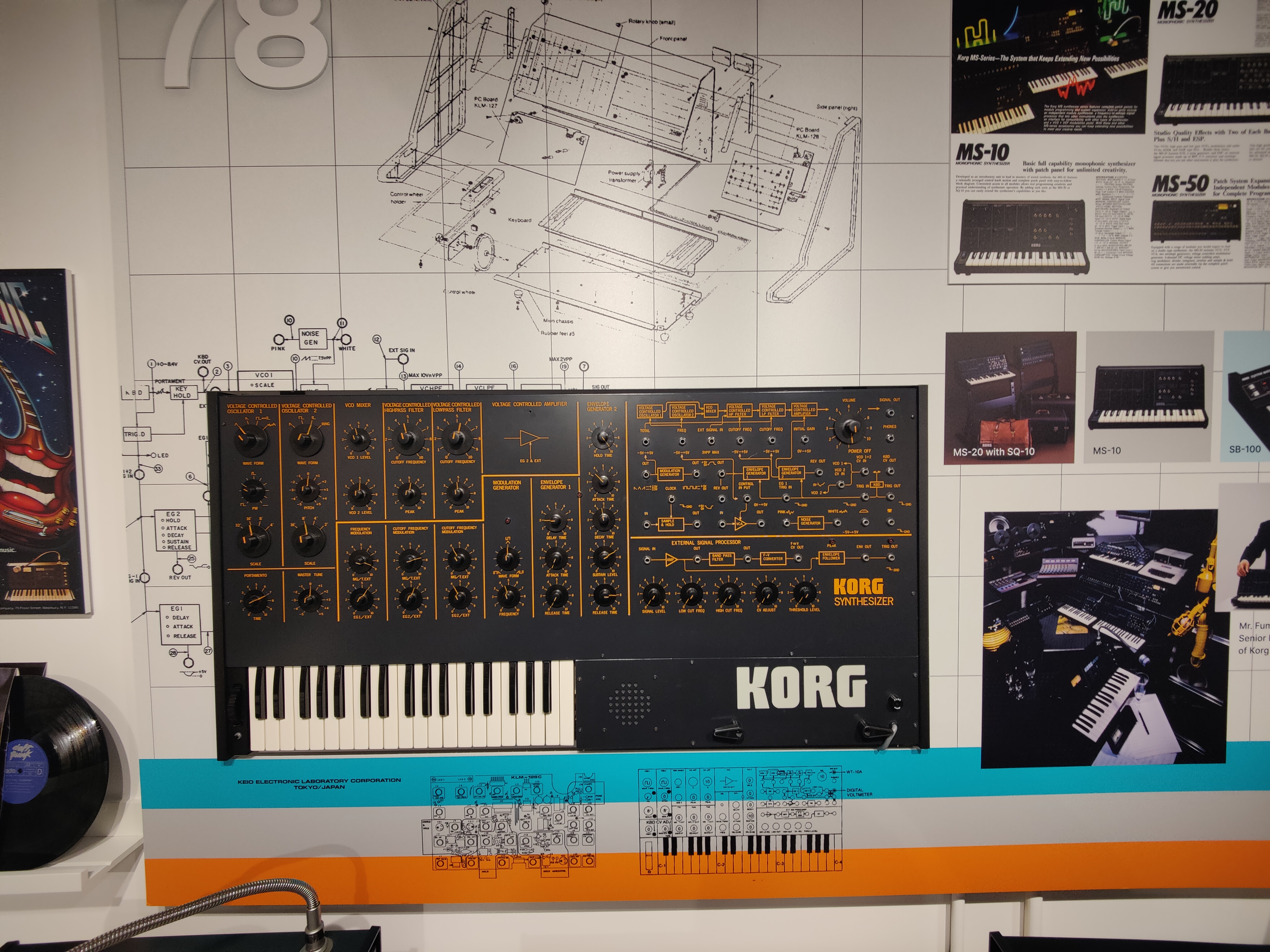
Korg MS-20 "blackboard"

Guided tours of the Korg Gallery are usually available and typically include demonstrations of some of the vintage synthesizers in the collection. Some of the synthesizers in the gallery may be played by visitors.

== See also ==
- Wurlitzers in the United Kingdom
- List of music museums
