= Ena Baga =

British pianist and theatre organist (1906–2004)

Ena Rosina Baga (5 January 1906 – 15 July 2004) was a British pianist and theatre organist. She is best known for improvising accompaniments to silent films, both in the 1920s and during the revival of interest in silent films that began in the 1970s.

== Career ==
=== Early years ===
Baga was born at Clerkenwell in 1906 to an Italian father, Constantine, and an Irish mother, Charlotte. Her father was musical director for the Angel Cinema, Islington and conducted an orchestra to accompany silent films. After the family moved to Southend, 12-year-old Baga began playing organ for the Roman Catholic Church.

=== 1920s–1930s ===
In the 1920s, when silent film theatres began replacing orchestras with one organist playing a theatre organ (as a cost-cutting measure), Baga became an organist for silent films, improvising music that dramatized the emotions or actions depicted in the film. In 1928, when "talking pictures" arrived, she provided music for the intermission between the opening "B-movie" and the feature movie.

Baga also did other musical jobs, such as accompanying music hall performers on a small Wurlitzer organ. In 1932 she was invited to Balmoral, where she improvised music for Charlie Chaplin's The Gold Rush for George V and Queen Mary. From 1940 to 1945, she replaced Reginald Dixon as the organist of the Tower Ballroom.

=== 1945–1960s ===
After the war, the great pipe organs in theatres and cinemas were seldom used. In some theatres, the organs were removed to make room for bigger Cinemascope screens. From 1957 to 1962 Baga visited southern Africa to perform for the Italian workers building the Kariba dam in Northern Rhodesia.

By the 1960s, though, interest in organs was revived, and Hammond organs were imported from the US as home organs. In the 1960s, Baga played an electric organ at Joe Lyons's corner house on Tottenham Court Road, and later at the Jolly Blacksmith at Fulwell. Baga updated her repertoire to suit the 1960s, and the new Hammond electric organ, performing tunes such as Smoke Gets in Your Eyes.

=== Late 1960s–2000s ===
In 1968, her Champagne for Two was released on Crystal CRY 3010. She was backed by percussionist Eric Howell.

When London theatres began showing silent films again in the late 1960s and into the 1980s, she played organ again for silent movies, improvising melodies and passages to suit the onscreen action. She performed on the Light Programme, and from 1969 on, she played on BBC Radio 2's The Organist Entertains. In 1976, she gave Oscar Peterson a masterclass on how play for silent film scenes.

She has several roles in film and television (playing herself), such as in Upstairs, Downstairs, and later in Richard Attenborough's film Chaplin (1992). Her recordings include Happy Hammond Plays the Beatles and Happy Hammond Plays Bacharach. Her composition Bagatelle is a word play on her name that uses its four letters as musical notes. Baga dressed in a theatrical style, with evening gowns and sequinned tops. She outlived her two husbands (Reginald Turnbull and then James Hamilton-Brown).

== Bibliography ==
- Porter, Laraine (27 June 2013). "Women Musicians in British Silent Cinema Prior to 1930". Journal of British Cinema and Television. 10 (3). Edinburgh University Press: 563–583. doi:10.3366/jbctv.2013.0158. ISSN 1743-4521.
