= Nigel Ogden =

English theatre organist and radio presenter (1954–2026)

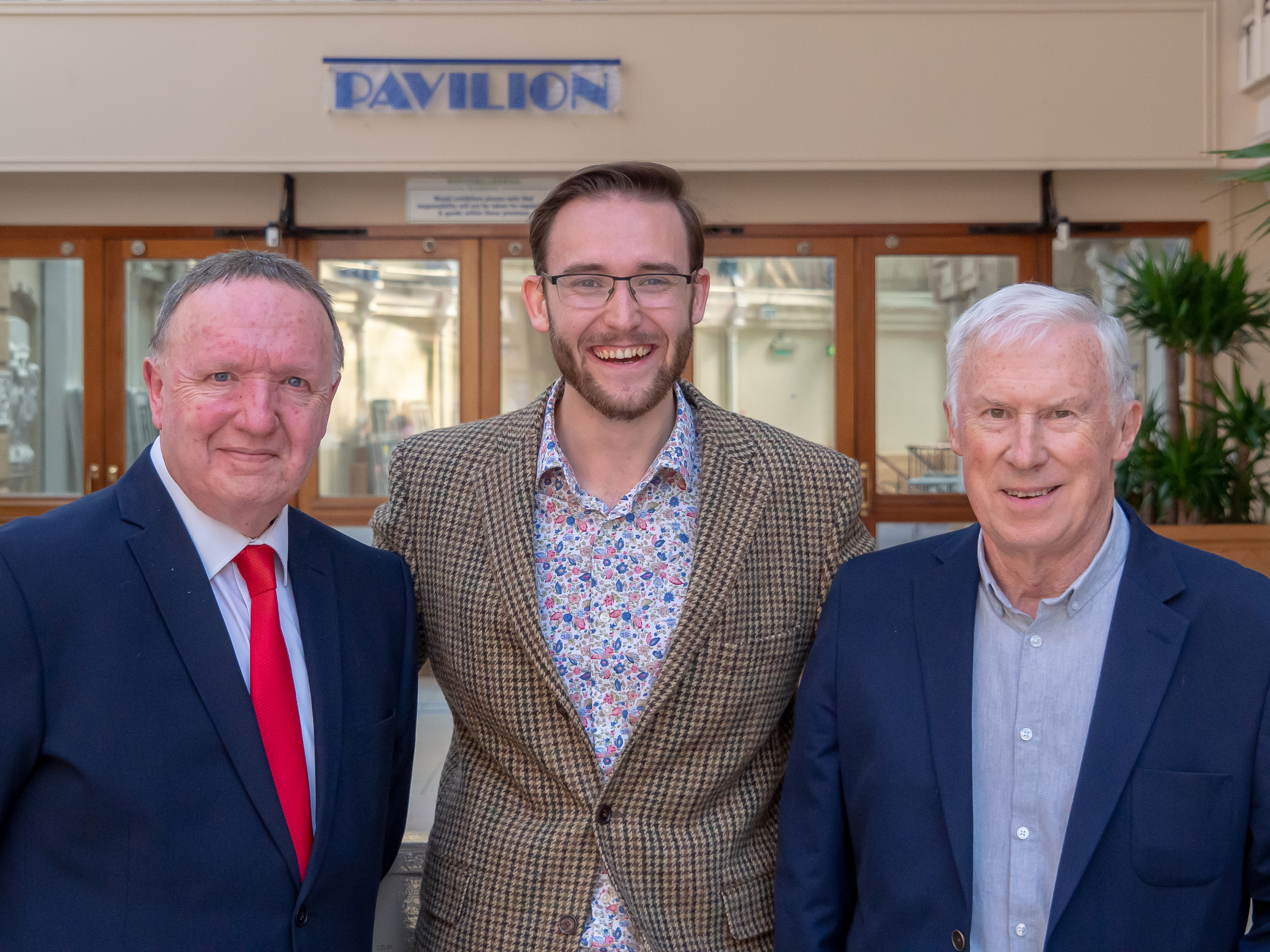
- Nigel Ogden (left) with his fellow Organist Encores Team members Damon Cox and John Leeming

Background information
- Born: 21 November 1954; Manchester, England
- Died: 27 January 2026 (aged 71) Lytham St Annes, Lancashire, England
- Occupations: Musician; Radio presenter
- Instruments: Theatre organ; Church organ

Nigel Timothy Ogden (21 November 1954 – 27 January 2026) was an English theatre organist, known for presenting and performing on the BBC Radio 2 programme The Organist Entertains between 1980 and the end of the show's run in 2018.

== Early life and career ==
Nigel Timothy Ogden was born on 21 November 1954 in Manchester, England, to Geoffrey Ogden, an accountant and church organist, and Eleanor (née Swales). He had a sister, Valerie.

Ogden had several years of piano lessons, before taking up the organ at the age of twelve. As a child, his family took him to Blackpool Tower Ballroom where he was influenced by the performances of Reginald Dixon on the Wurlitzer organ. He practiced on the Wurlitzer organs of Manchester’s Gaumont and Odeon cinemas, for a guinea an hour.

He trained to be a teacher, and subsequently worked as a sales demonstrator for an electronic organ retail business in Hyde, Cheshire. He then worked as a travelling sales rep for Boosey & Hawkes, before starting his own business selling organs in Sale, Cheshire.

From 1972, he started appearing on the BBC Radio 2 programme The Organist Entertains, eventually taking over from Robin Richmond as presenter in March 1980. Ogden presented the weekly programme for 38 years, until its final episode in 2018.

Ogden was also a composer and arranger, publishing collections such as "Fifteen Practical Voluntaries for Church Organist" and "Afternoon Tea with the Duchess", composed to commemorate the 50th anniversary of the five-manual Compton organ at the Odeon Cinema in Leicester Square, London. In 1998, Ogden composed a piece called "Farewell to the Plaza", after the Stockport Plaza was threatened with closure. He was a touring musician, playing both theatre and church organs.

In 1993, he was the organist for the Channel 4 production of Dennis Potter's Lipstick on Your Collar, substituting as the 'hands and feet' of Harold Atterbow, played by Roy Hudd.

After the final episode of The Organist Entertains was broadcast in 2018, Ogden presented regularly on The Organist Encores podcast, for five years.

== Personal life and death ==
Ogden lived in Lytham St Annes. He was a Morris Minor enthusiast.

In 1968, the Lancastrian Theatre Organ Trust was formed, he became a regular at the trust’s monthly concerts, playing along for screenings of silent films.

He was awarded a British Academy of Songwriters, Composers and Authors Gold Badge of merit on 17 October 2012. He released a number of CDs.

Ogden died in Lytham St Annes on 27 January 2026, at the age of 71. The musical trust Bells & Whistles paid tribute, stating; "We are very saddened to hear of the passing of our dear friend Nigel Ogden. Nigel has supported us from day one and was the first organist to appear in concert ..."
