= Horace Finch =

British pianist, organist (1906–1980)

Horace Finch (23 July 1906 – 28 September 1980) was an English pianist and organist.

== Early life and education ==
Horace Finch was born in Clock Face, St. Helens, Lancashire, England. He began piano and organ studies in 1910 at the age of four. By 1915, he was organist at Clock Face Methodist Church, St. Helens. In 1919, he left St. Helens for Blackpool for health reasons.

In 1920, he began piano studies with Robert Gregory. Throughout the 1920s, he took several positions playing in cinemas up and down the Fylde coast and, on April 1, 1926, took up his position as solo and orchestral pianist in the Blackpool Tower Orchestra. On Whit Sunday 1927 he became 'the first' English pianist to perform Gershwin's "Rhapsody in Blue" from memory. He also made his debut on record with 'Bertini' and the Tower Band. In addition to playing the piano, he also played xylophone and accordion and also made a few recordings with Bertini on the 'Crystalite' label using the small Decca Wurlitzer in London.

== Wurlitzer organs ==
In 1929, a Wurlitzer organ was installed in the Tower Ballroom in Blackpool and after three organists, Reginald Dixon was appointed. Dixon later designed his own Wurlitzer and the original Tower organ was removed and enlarged as a 'twin' to the new organ to be installed in the Empress Ballroom, Blackpool within the Winter Gardens complex. Horace Finch was chosen as the new organist for the Empress Ballroom, the new organ being opened on 3 April 1935.

Radio broadcasts soon followed as well as solo organ recordings, with the first broadcast on 20 December 1935 at 6.45pm on the BBC Regional Programme. In 1939, the New Opera House Blackpool (also in the Wintergardens) opened on 14 July with a Wurlitzer organ installed to the design of Mr. Finch. It was the 'last' new Wurlitzer organ to be installed in the UK. This organ contained a rare Tibia Plena rank of pipes, the only other in the UK being installed at the Gaumont Theatre, Holloway, which was destroyed in World War II (oddly, the remains of the Holloway organ provided spares for the Tower Wurlitzer after the fire of 1956). The Opera House organ has recently been restored and returned to the spotlight by Cannock Chase Organ Club led by Wolverhampton City Organist, Steve Tovey. Soon after, War came and Finch joined the RAF.

== 1946 onward ==
After the war, he took up his duties again at the Winter Gardens playing both organs installed there as well as deputising for Reginald Dixon at the Tower with fellow organist, Watson Holmes.

On 14 December 1956 a fire almost destroyed the Blackpool Tower Ballroom and during this time, Dixon took up residency at the Empress whilst Finch was demoted to the Winter Gardens Pavilion on the Hammond Organ. By 1958, he was back on his Wurlitzer. On 19 October 1962 he made what was to be his last broadcast from the organ of the Opera House as on 16 November, he sustained an injury to his left hand which prevented him from playing publicly again.

He died, aged 74, in St Anne's on Sea.

He composed a few pieces of light music which were never published, but were broadcast by the BBC including "The Blackpool Express" and "Get Goin'".

Finch was overshadowed by Dixon and never became as famous as the latter. Finch did, however, notch up a great deal of air time on the radio during his tenure as resident organist at the Winter Gardens. His position was taken by Ernest Broadbent who, in 1970, would take over at the Tower.

== See also ==
- Organist
- Wurlitzer
- Blackpool Tower
- Reginald Dixon
- Theatre organ
