= The Organist Entertains =

Long-running music programme broadcast on BBC Radio 2

- Genre: Organ music
- Running time: 30 minutes
- Country of origin: United Kingdom
- Language: English
- Home station: BBC Radio 2
- Hosted by: Robin Richmond (1969–1980); Nigel Ogden (1980–2018)
- Original release: 11 June 1969 – 8 May 2018
- Opening theme: "From This Moment On" by Cole Porter
- Website: www.bbc.co.uk/programmes/b006wr9w

The Organist Entertains is a long-running music programme broadcast on BBC Radio 2. The 30-minute programme focused on the organ in its many guises, and played recordings and live broadcasts of theatre organs, pipe organs and electronic organs around the United Kingdom and the rest of the world.

The programme ran as a weekly feature on Radio 2 from 11 June 1969 and was originally presented by Robin Richmond, playing himself and introducing guest organists. Early guests included Ena Baga (Odeon, Hammersmith), Doreen Chadwick (The Gaumont, Manchester), Harold Robinson Cleaver (Astra, Llandudno), William Davies (The Granada, Tooting), Douglas Reeve (The Dome, Brighton), Dudley Savage (ABC Plymouth) and Gerald Shaw (Odeon, Leicester Square). In 1970 BBC Records issued an album featuring performances by Richmond along with guest organists from the show, including Ernest Broadbent, Jackie Brown, Reginald Porter Brown, Robinson Cleaver, William Davies, Vic Hammett and Charles Smitton.

On 12 November 1970, Robin Richmond introduced the newest BBC Theatre Organ, installed at The Playhouse Theatre, Manchester, with performances on the organ by Ernest Broadbent, Reginald Dixon and Reginald Porter Brown.

In 1980, Nigel Ogden took over as presenter. In Ogden's absence, the programme was occasionally guest presented by Blackpool Tower organist Phil Kelsall. The programme's introductory music was "From This Moment On" by Cole Porter, played by Ogden.

On 10 January 2018, the BBC announced that the programme was to be discontinued after being on air for almost half a century. The final programme was broadcast on 8 May 2018.
