= Reginald Dixon =

English theatre organist (1904–1985)

Reginald Dixon MBE ARCM
- Born: Reginald Herbert Dixon; 16 October 1904; Sheffield, West Riding of Yorkshire, England
- Died: 9 May 1985 (aged 80) Blackpool, Lancashire, England
- Occupation: Organist
- Instrument: Theatre organ
- Labels: Rex, Columbia, Zonophone, Sterno
- Formerly of: Bertini

Reginald Herbert Dixon (16 October 1904 – 9 May 1985) was an English theatre organist who was primarily known for his position as organist at the Tower Ballroom, Blackpool, a position he held from March 1930 until March 1970. He made and sold more recordings than any other organist before him, or since. He was in high demand throughout his tenure; during his fifty-year career, he was one of the top-selling artists, his prolific output ranking alongside that of Victor Silvester and Bing Crosby.

== Biography ==
=== Early life ===
Dixon was born in Ecclesall, Sheffield on 16 October 1904. By the age of two, Dixon started to play the organ and piano. Seeing the keen spirit and potential that he possessed for music made his father realise that his son was worthy of tuition. In addition to Dixon's tuition he also practised two hours a day on piano. By the age of twelve, he was already performing in concerts at local music festivals, and by the age of thirteen, he began taking lessons in organ at his local church. At the age of thirteen, he had to give up his schooling in order to continue his music studies. He was now practising at least 8 hours per day or more. He also had applied for the post of organist at Birley Carr Methodist church and was chosen from several applicants, and was also assistant organist at Hillsborough Methodist church. He enrolled at the University of Sheffield studying counterpoint and harmony, and was awarded Associate of the Royal College of Music (ARCM) when he was 17 years old.

=== Cinema experience ===
Dixon auditioned at the Stocksbridge Palace, near Sheffield. The piece he played was Debussy's "Arabesque" and he was employed as pianist and musical director, for the sum of £3 per week. Dixon gained a lot of experience in this job, and greatly enlarged his repertoire and developed his technique further. After eighteen months, Dixon accepted a job as pianist and deputy organist at Chesterfield Picture House, where his wage was £5 a week. To supplement this wage, he was also giving lessons. At Chesterfield he was called upon more and more often to play the organ, and when he was 21, he became a fully professional theatre organist. A year later he became organist and pianist of the Heeley Palace in Sheffield, and was still teaching. For practice he was also playing at the Regent Cinema on a 2/8 Wurlitzer, which he became fond of. He was employed as orchestral organist at the West End cinema in Birmingham, from where he changed over to become organist at the Regent Cinema, in Dudley. Here he played a 2/6 Wurlitzer, and it was while he was here that Dixon was giving lessons to Harry Farmer.

After a time, Dixon left for a job at the New Victoria Cinema in Church Street, Preston, where he played a 2/9 Wurlitzer.

=== The Tower Ballroom ===
In March 1930, Dixon was invited to audition for the position of organist at Blackpool's Tower Ballroom, which, at the time, contained a 2/10 Wurlitzer. Previous to this audition, there had been two other organists, Max Bruce and James Hodgetts FRCO. The Wurlitzer's job had been to provide music for dancing, however neither organist could tackle the difficult task of keeping a strict tempo. After auditioning, Dixon was given a trial, with the ultimatum that, if he did not make a success of playing the Wurlitzer for dancing, both he and the Wurlitzer would go. Once he had mastered playing in strict tempo, Dixon further developed his playing style, with a strong bass line, and both hands providing accompaniment and melody. Dixon was mainly left-handed and he often played the accompaniment rhythm with his left hand as well as the melody using second touch. This left his right hand free to supplement the music. This became Dixon's trade mark instantly recognisable style. Soon enough, Dixon had fully exploited the 2/10 Wurlitzer's capabilities. Since this was holding him back, and the dancers, this made Dixon plan a larger, more suitable instrument. Within weeks of his appointment at the Tower, the BBC were broadcasting Mr R. H Dixon from the Tower Ballroom, Blackpool. One such broadcast was as follows:

- "Chromatic Waltz No. 5" (Godard)
- "Cheer Up and Smile" – (Conrad)
- "Sing, You Sinners" (Sam Coslow)
- Falling in Love Again (Hollander)
- "When I Passed The Old Church Door" (Nicholls)
- "Exactly Like You" Fields
- "Gee! But I'd Like to Make You Happy" (Shay and Ward)
- "Oh My Maiden, My Maiden" (Lehar)
- "Blue is The Night" Fisher

This broadcast was different from any previous organ broadcast, and with Dixon's unique style, nothing like it had been heard before. Dixon was also playing alongside bandleader Bertini in concerts, dance sessions, radio broadcasts and recordings.

By 1931, Dixon's broadcasts were becoming highly popular, and the time slot was expanded from 30 minutes, to 45 minutes, and were made as often as 5 times a week to the UK alone. Regular broadcasts were also being made to the British Empire, and Dixon was often in the ballroom in the very early hours of the morning, broadcasting live to places such as Canada, India, Africa and Australia.

During the winter months, Dixon toured the UK, visiting cinemas and concert halls all over the country. These venues soon filled to capacity, like the Tower Ballroom was daily filled to its capacity of 7,000 people. In 1933 the Daily Mail stated that Dixon was the "most popular of all cinema organists".

In March 1935, the organ which Dixon had longed for was first broadcast. The new 3/13 Wurlitzer was broadcast to the British Empire, and after, the Tower Company was inundated with telephone calls from people giving praise to the new organ, and Dixon's handling of the new instrument. Later that year, he made a broadcast from Manchester Road Congregational Church, Nelson, with the music of Bach, Handel and Massenet. The new Wurlitzer was also heavily used in the Tower Company's annual production of Handel's "Messiah" with Dixon at the console. His first appearance (of many) at the console of the BBC Theatre Organ in St George's Hall, Langham Place was on 24 November 1936.

After a spell away from radio in winter 1938, there was much speculation about Dixon leaving his Tower post to become the new BBC organist, after Reginald Foort had recently resigned from the post. Dixon said to this "I am under contract with the Tower company for another three years and I have also fixed up for a long winter with the Bernstein's Theatres Limited – the Granada theatres. If I had the offer of the job, I do not think I would accept it. I certainly would not take it if the finances were the same as applies to Mr Foort" Later that year, the "Daily Express" voted Dixon as Britain's number-one organist. He came top of a nationwide poll, and had double, or more than double the votes of any other organist.

On 14 July 1939 Dixon, and Horace Finch, gave the first public performance of the new Opera House Wurlitzer, the last new Wurlitzer Organ to come to the UK.

=== Second World War ===
In 1940, Dixon joined the R.A.F. During his time there, he was often called upon to entertain service personnel, and was still to be heard on radio occasionally, as well as playing for concerts at the Tower Ballroom. While in the RAF he attained the rank of Flying Officer, and he left the RAF as Squadron Leader. In 1946, he returned to the tower, and was busier than ever. In addition to his Tower broadcasts, he was also broadcasting from Europe.

=== 1950s ===
By 1952, Dixon had made over 1,000 broadcasts, and had already made several television appearances. In the later half of 1952, Dixon fell ill, through being overworked and completely exhausted. After a few months, he was back in full health, and returned to the Tower Ballroom. In 1954, he starred in BBC's You're Only Young Once and in 1955, he performed for Queen Elizabeth II, at the console of the 3/13 Wurlitzer of Blackpool's Opera House, for the Royal Variety Performance. After the show, the Queen said to him that she often listened to him on the radio. By now, Dixon had been at the tower, and on radio, for 25 years, and had performed, according to the Empire News, to over 60 million people live at the Tower ballroom alone, and radio listening figures were now topping 6 million for each broadcast he made.

In 1956, he had his own radio show on the BBC called Meet Me at the Tower, which he was joined with guest organist and often by the BBC Northern Dance Orchestra. In addition to this, he still had his normal broadcasts to play for. In his weekly articles in the "Daily Herald", he had done much speculating as to who would turn on the Blackpool Illuminations that year. The Blackpool Illuminations have been an annual attraction since 1879, and the switch on ceremony was a prestigious event. Up until that time celebrities such as Prince George the Duke of Kent, George Formby, Jacob Malik (Soviet Ambassador), John H. Whitney (U.S. Ambassador), Valerie Hobson and Dame Anna Neagle had all turned on Blackpool's illuminations. Dixon soon found out that it was himself who was to turn on the illuminations that year, and the event was televised to a Europe-wide audience.

In December 1956 a fire, which started in the Tower Lounge Restaurant, spread to the Ballroom. Fortunately the organ survived owing to its position above the proscenium arch, however, the console was badly damaged but was later fixed. While the Tower ballroom was being restored at the cost of £500,000, Dixon resumed his schedule in the Empress Ballroom, where in 1935, a 3/13 Wurlitzer had been installed. In 1958, he returned to the Tower Ballroom Wurlitzer, and things proceeded as normal, in the newly restored ballroom.

On 3 July 1958, The Bulletin newspaper reported that Dixon was to have an operation that Sunday, quoting him as saying "A nerve in my right elbow is affecting the hand". It was "the result of an injury received in a motorcycle smash when I was a youth." The Bulletin reported that "He wanted to postpone the operation until the end of the season, but doctors have warned him that delay might mean losing the use of the hand". He returned to the ballroom and its Wurlitzer later in the same month, having made over 2,000 broadcasts.

=== 1960s ===
In July 1966, the Reading Eagle newspaper of Reading, Pennsylvania, US, reported "There are many places in the U.S where people go to dance to the music of big orchestras, such as the Hollywood Palladium or New York's Roseland Ballroom, but in England, as many as 2,500 dancers and 4,000 spectators on a single evening patronise the Tower Ballroom in Blackpool to hear Reginald Dixon play the organ". In the same year, Dixon was awarded an MBE for his services in entertaining the public and radio listeners the world over. At the ceremony in Buckingham Palace, while pinning on his medal, Queen Elizabeth II said to him, "I have often listened to you, you must have been there [at the Tower Ballroom] for a long time now". Dixon replied, "Yes ma'am. I have been there since March 1930, but it does not seem as long as that".

In 1969, he was also awarded by the BBC for the years of pleasure he had given to millions. The same year, Dixon announced his retirement from his Tower Ballroom post in order to spend more time with his family.

At the end of the season, Dixon retired from playing for dancing at the Ballroom, but continued to play for Sunday concerts as normal. It was on 29 March (Easter Sunday) 1970 that he gave his final concert on the Tower Ballroom Wurlitzer, an event which was recorded and broadcast by the BBC, and he was also interviewed by Robin Richmond for the BBC's The Organist Entertains.

== Retirement ==
Dixon's retirement from the Tower did not mean retirement altogether. He was still broadcasting to a very large audience, and he was also on tour across the UK and Europe, fulfilling engagements with various organ societies and clubs, determined to see the organ's survival. While in the Netherlands, he was also on radio and TV, as well as making a new LP. In addition, he had requests from both the US and Australia to conduct tours.

He died on 9 May 1985 in Blackpool, aged 80. He was cremated at Carleton Crematorium, Blackpool.

== Discography ==
Between 1932 and 1958, Reginald Dixon released some 296 records on 78 rpm discs which the table below lists. It does not include releases on 45 rpm, 33⅓ rpm or cassette releases.

Release year is listed month/year.

Dixon 78 rpm discography
ID1	Record title	Record label	Cat.No.	Organ recorded	Release year
1	Dixon Speaking / I Do Like to Be Beside the Seaside	Rex		Wurlitzer 2/5 . Crystalate Studios	
2	Dear Old Home Songs	Homochord H	108	Wurlitzer 2/10. Tower Ballroom. Blackpool	
3	Shine On, Harvest Moon	Zonophone MR	2043		
4	Just an Echo in the Valley	Zonophone MR	792	Wurlitzer 2/10. Tower Ballroom. Blackpool	02/32
5	Wish Me Luck, Wish Me Goodbye / An Old Lullaby	Zonophone MR	1590	Wurlitzer 2/10. Tower Ballroom. Blackpool	02/32
6	Guilty / Many Happy Returns of the Day	Sterno	881	Wurlitzer 2/10. Tower Ballroom. Blackpool	02/32
7	Home / I Was True	Sterno	903	Wurlitzer 2/10. Tower Ballroom. Blackpool	03/32
8	Penguins Patrol / Speak to Me of Love	Sterno	893	Wurlitzer 2/10. Tower Ballroom. Blackpool	03/32
9	Classica Selection	Sterno	913	Wurlitzer 2/10. Tower Ballroom. Blackpool	04/32
10	I'll Always be True / Faded Summer Love	Sterno	912	Wurlitzer 2/10. Tower Ballroom. Blackpool	04/32
11	Leslie Stuart Selection	Sterno	927	Wurlitzer 2/10. Tower Ballroom. Blackpool	05/32
12	The Dear Old Home Songs	Sterno	935	Wurlitzer 2/10. Tower Ballroom. Blackpool	05/32
13	Wee McGregor Patrol / Whistler and His Dog	Sterno	956	Wurlitzer 2/10. Tower Ballroom. Blackpool	06/32
14	By the Fireside / Believe Me	Sterno	947	Wurlitzer 2/10. Tower Ballroom. Blackpool	06/32
15	Goodnight Vienna / Whistling Waltz	Sterno	955	Wurlitzer 2/10. Tower Ballroom. Blackpool	06/32
16	Grasshopper's Dance / Alice, Where Art Thou?	Sterno	975	Wurlitzer 2/10. Tower Ballroom. Blackpool	07/32
17	Lilac Time Selection	Sterno	8030	Wurlitzer 2/10. Tower Ballroom. Blackpool	07/32
18	Voice in the Old Village Choir. With Bertini	Sterno	983	Wurlitzer 2/10. Tower Ballroom. Blackpool	08/32
19	Dixieland Selection	Sterno	989	Wurlitzer 2/10. Tower Ballroom. Blackpool	08/32
20	Gypsy Moon / Paradise	Sterno	988	Wurlitzer 2/10. Tower Ballroom. Blackpool	08/32
21	Snuggled on Your Shoulder / Auf Wiedersehen, My Dear.	Sterno	1000	Wurlitzer 2/10. Tower Ballroom. Blackpool	09/32
22	Classical Memories	Sterno	1012	Wurlitzer 2/10. Tower Ballroom. Blackpool	09/32
23	Crazy People / Singing in the Moonlight	Zonophone	6190	Wurlitzer 2/10. Tower Ballroom. Blackpool	10/32
24	Wherever You Are / The Clouds Will Soon Roll By	Sterno	1033	Wurlitzer 2/10. Tower Ballroom. Blackpool	10/32
25	Skaters Waltz / Sirenes Waltz	Sterno	1025	Wurlitzer 2/10. Tower Ballroom. Blackpool	10/32
26	When the Band Goes Marching By / Watch the Navy	Zonophone	6189	Wurlitzer 2/10. Tower Ballroom. Blackpool	10/32
27	Pal of My Dreams / Song of the Bells	Zonophone	6221	Wurlitzer 2/10. Tower Ballroom. Blackpool	11/32
28	I Do Like to See a Game of Football. With Bertini	Zonophone	6217	Wurlitzer 2/10. Tower Ballroom. Blackpool	11/32
29	By an Old Abbey Door / Through That Open Window. With Bertini	Zonophone	6211	Wurlitzer 2/10. Tower Ballroom. Blackpool	11/32
30	It Was So Beautiful / Moonlight on the River	Sterno	1046	Wurlitzer 2/10. Tower Ballroom. Blackpool	11/32
31	Community Land	Zonophone	6218	Wurlitzer 2/10. Tower Ballroom. Blackpool	11/32
32	A Day's Outing - Effects for Fred Walmsley	Zonophone	6255	Wurlitzer 2/10. Tower Ballroom. Blackpool	12/32
33	As Jean Stafford - Tangled Tunes	Redwing R	1101	Wurlitzer 2/10. Tower Ballroom. Blackpool	12/32
34	As Roy Wilson - Tangled Tunes	Sterno	1076	Wurlitzer 2/10. Tower Ballroom. Blackpool	12/32
35	Swing of the Kilt / Penguins Patrol	Sterno	1057	Wurlitzer 2/10. Tower Ballroom. Blackpool	12/32
36	Round the World with Reginald Dixon	Zonophone	6271	Wurlitzer 2/10. Tower Ballroom. Blackpool	12/32
37	Medley of Christmas Carols	Zonophone	6251	Wurlitzer 2/10. Tower Ballroom. Blackpool	12/32
38	As Roy Wilson - Once Upon a Time Selection	Sterno	1099	Wurlitzer 2/10. Tower Ballroom. Blackpool	01/33
39	As Roy Wilson - Family Favourites	Sterno	1088	Wurlitzer 2/10. Tower Ballroom. Blackpool	01/33
40	Chorusland. With Bertini	Zonophone MR	798	Wurlitzer 2/10. Tower Ballroom. Blackpool	02/33
41	As Roy Wilson - Songs Old and New	Sterno	1110	Wurlitzer 2/10. Tower Ballroom. Blackpool	02/33
42	Passing of the Regiments	Zonophone MR	778	Wurlitzer 2/10. Tower Ballroom. Blackpool	02/33
43	Roll Along Kentucky Moon / My Mother's Evening Prayer. With Bertini	Zonophone MR	799	Wurlitzer 2/10. Tower Ballroom. Blackpool	02/33
44	Waltzland. With Bertini	Zonophone MR	818	Wurlitzer 2/10. Tower Ballroom. Blackpool	03/33
45	The Storm	Zonophone MR	816	Wurlitzer 2/10. Tower Ballroom. Blackpool	03/33
46	There's Something About a Soldier / Have You Ever Been Lonely?	Zonophone MR	857	Wurlitzer 2/10. Tower Ballroom. Blackpool	04/33
47	There's Something About a Soldier / Have You Ever Been Lonely	Zonophone MR	857	Wurlitzer 2/10. Tower Ballroom. Blackpool	04/33
48	Let Bygones Be Bygones / Goodnight Waltz. With Bertini	Zonophone MR	870	Wurlitzer 2/10. Tower Ballroom. Blackpool	04/33
49	Remember Me / Broken Rosary. With Bertini	Zonophone MR	869	Wurlitzer 2/10. Tower Ballroom, Blackpool	04/33
50	The Night You Sang on the Radio / Rolling Stone Roll Home. With Bertini	Regal Zonophone MR	871	Wurlitzer 2/10. Tower Ballroom. Blackpool	04/33
51	After All I've Done for You / They've Taken Away My Sally. With Bertini	Zonophone MR	895	Wurlitzer 2/10. Tower Ballroom. Blackpool	05/33
52	At the Close of a Long, Long Day / I Want a Girl Like Daddy Had. With Bertini	Zonophone MR	894	Wurlitzer 2/10. Tower Ballroom. Blackpool	05/33
53	Young and Healthy / Down the Trail to the Girl I Love	Zonophone MR	889	Wurlitzer 2/10. Tower Ballroom. Blackpool	05/33
54	Sundown in a Little Green Hollow / It's Time to Sing Sweet Adeline Again. With Bertini	Zonophone MR	1007	Wurlitzer 2/10. Tower Ballroom. Blackpool	08/33
55	Having a Good Time / Sidewalk Waltz	Zonophone MR	984	Wurlitzer 2/10. Tower Ballroom. Blackpool	08/33
56	Old Spinning Wheel / In the Valley of the Moon. With Bertini	Zonophone MR	964	Wurlitzer 2/10. Tower Ballroom. Blackpool	08/33
57	Blackpool Song Mixture No.2	Zonophone MR	983	Wurlitzer 2/10. Tower Ballroom. Blackpool	08/33
58	Blackpool Song Mixture No.1	Zonophone MR	965	Wurlitzer 2/10. Tower Ballroom. Blackpool	08/33
59	Old Spinning Wheel / In the Valley of the Moon. With Larry Brennan	Zonophone MR	964	Wurlitzer 2/10. Tower Ballroom. Blackpool	08/33
60	There's a Cabin in the Pines / Sweetheart Darling. With Bertini	Zonophone MR	1023	Wurlitzer 2/10. Tower Ballroom. Blackpool	09/33
61	Fifty Years of Song	Zonophone MR	995	Wurlitzer 2/10. Tower Ballroom. Blackpool	09/33
62	I've Found the Right Girl / Madamoiselle. With Bertini	Zonophone MR	1044	Wurlitzer 2/10. Tower Ballroom. Blackpool	10/33
63	Don't Blame Me / Forever. With Bertini	Zonophone MR	1043	Wurlitzer 2/10. Tower Ballroom. Blackpool	10/33
64	Blackpool Song Mixture No.3	Zonophone MR	1041	Wurlitzer 2/10. Tower Ballroom. Blackpool	10/33
65	Blackpool Song Mixture No.4	Zonophone MR	1042	Wurlitzer 2/10. Tower Ballroom. Blackpool	10/33
66	Lay Your Head on My Shoulder / Goodnight, Little Girl of My Dreams. With Bertini	Zonophone MR	1069	Wurlitzer 2/10. Tower Ballroom. Blackpool	11/33
67	Wedding of Mr Mickey Mouse / Oh, Johanna! With Bertini	Zonophone MR	1068	Wurlitzer 2/10. Tower Ballroom. Blackpool	11/33
68	My Lucky Day / Happy Ending. With Bertini	Zonophone MR	1067	Wurlitzer 2/10. Tower Ballroom. Blackpool	11/33
69	From Me to You / Let the World go Drifting By. With Bertini	Zonophone MR	1066	Wurlitzer 2/10. Tower Ballroom. Blackpool	11/33
70	As Roy Wilson - Family Favourites / Classica Selection	Sterno	5008	Wurlitzer 2/10. Tower Ballroom. Blackpool	11/33
71	Blackpool Song Mixture No.5	Zonophone MR	1056	Wurlitzer 2/10. Tower Ballroom. Blackpool	11/33
72	Viennese Memories of Lehar	Zonophone MR	1052	Wurlitzer 2/10. Tower Ballroom. Blackpool	11/33
73	God Bless You / Goodnight. With Bertini	Zonophone MR	1137	Wurlitzer 2/10. Tower Ballroom. Blackpool	12/33
74	Yvonne / Roll on Blue Moon. With Bertini	Zonophone MR	1136	Wurlitzer 2/10. Tower Ballroom. Blackpool	12/33
75	Classica Selection	Zonophone MR	1123	Wurlitzer 2/10. Tower Ballroom. Blackpool	12/33
76	Blackpool Song Mixture No.7	Zonophone MR	1132	Wurlitzer 2/10. Tower Ballroom. Blackpool	12/33
77	Blackpool Song Mixture No.6	Zonophone MR	1076	Wurlitzer 2/10. Tower Ballroom. Blackpool	12/33
78	Blackpool Song Mixture No.8	Zonophone MR	1133	Wurlitzer 2/10. Tower Ballroom. Blackpool	12/33
79	Goodnight / God Bless You. Larry Brennan	Zonophone MR	1137	Wurlitzer 2/10. Tower Ballroom. Blackpool	12/33
80	Just a Year Ago / Was Love a Dream. With Bertini	Zonophone MR	1166	Wurlitzer 2/10. Tower Ballroom. Blackpool	01/34
81	Lullaby Lady / At the End of the Day. With Bertini	Zonophone MR	1165	Wurlitzer 2/10. Tower Ballroom. Blackpool	01/34
82	Blackpool Song Mixture No.10	Zonophone MR	1164	Wurlitzer 2/10. Tower Ballroom. Blackpool	01/34
83	Blackpool Song Mixture No.9	Zonophone MR	1163	Wurlitzer 2/10. Tower Ballroom. Blackpool	01/34
84	As P. Barlow - Dixieland Selection	Plaza P	297	Wurlitzer 2/10. Tower Ballroom. Blackpool	01/34
85	As P. Barlow - Penguins Patrol	Plaza P	274	Wurlitzer 2/10. Tower Ballroom. Blackpool	01/34
86	More Melodious Memories	Zonophone MR	1179	Wurlitzer 2/10. Tower Ballroom. Blackpool	02/34
87	In a Little White Church / That's Why I Need You Tonight. With Bertini	Zonophone MR	1287	Wurlitzer 2/10. Tower Ballroom. Blackpool	05/34
88	Song of Surrender / Old River Road. With Bertini	Zonophone MR	1286	Wurlitzer 2/10. Tower Ballroom. Blackpool	05/34
89	Blackpool Switchback No.1	Zonophone MR	1281	Wurlitzer 2/10. Tower Ballroom. Blackpool	05/34
90	London Bridge / Knightsbridge	Zonophone MR	1309	Wurlitzer 2/10. Tower Ballroom. Blackpool	07/34
91	Blackpool Switchback No.2	Zonophone MR	1300	Wurlitzer 2/10. Tower Ballroom. Blackpool	07/34
92	Comedy Land. With Bertini	Zonophone MR	1341	Wurlitzer 2/10. Tower Ballroom. Blackpool	08/34
93	She's an Old Fashioned Girl / By the Old Wishing Well. With Bertini	Zonophone MR	1329	Wurlitzer 2/10. Tower Ballroom. Blackpool	08/34
94	Blackpool Switchback No.3	Zonophone MR	1336	Wurlitzer 2/10. Tower Ballroom. Blackpool	08/34
95	New Blackpool Song Mixture No.2 With Bertini	Zonophone MR	1363	Wurlitzer 2/10. Tower Ballroom. Blackpool	09/34
96	New Blackpool Song Mixture No.1 With Bertini	Zonophone MR	1362	Wurlitzer 2/10. Tower Ballroom. Blackpool	09/34
97	Storm Over the Countryside	Zonophone MR	1349	Wurlitzer 2/10. Tower Ballroom. Blackpool	09/34
98	New Blackpool Song Mixture No.3 With Bertini	Zonophone MR	1420	Wurlitzer 2/10. Tower Ballroom. Blackpool	10/34
99	Beside the Seaside in Other Lands	Zonophone MR	1402	Wurlitzer 2/10. Tower Ballroom. Blackpool	10/34
100	The Early Twenties Medley / New Blackpool Song Mixture No.4. With Larry Brennan	Zonophone MR	1421	Wurlitzer 2/10. Tower Ballroom. Blackpool	10/34
101	Tiger Rag / Canadian Capers	Zonophone MR	1432	Wurlitzer 2/10. Tower Ballroom. Blackpool	11/34
102	A Collier's Child / What a Wonderful Friend is Mother	Zonophone MR	1496	Wurlitzer 2/10. Tower Ballroom. Blackpool	12/34
103	Dixonland No.1	Zonophone MR	1497	Wurlitzer 2/10. Tower Ballroom. Blackpool	12/34
104	Dixonland No.2	Zonophone MR	1498	Wurlitzer 2/10. Tower Ballroom. Blackpool	12/34
105	Tangoland. With Larry Brennan	Zonophone MR	1459	Wurlitzer 2/10. Tower Ballroom. Blackpool	12/34
106	Veterans of Songland	Zonophone MR	1512	Wurlitzer 2/10. Tower Ballroom. Blackpool	12/34
107	Can I Be Sure of You? / In the Valley of Yesterday. With Larry Brennan	Zonophone MR	1525	Wurlitzer 2/10. Tower Ballroom. Blackpool	01/35
108	Dixonland No.3	Zonophone MR	1539	Wurlitzer 2/10. Tower Ballroom. Blackpool	01/35
109	Dixonland No.4	Zonophone MR	1540	Wurlitzer 2/10. Tower Ballroom. Blackpool	01/35
110	Dixonland No.5	Zonophone MR	1554	Wurlitzer 2/10. Tower Ballroom. Blackpool	02/35
111	Dixonland No.6	Zonophone MR	1555	Wurlitzer 2/10. Tower Ballroom. Blackpool	02/35
112	Blackpool Switchback No.4	Zonophone MR	1595	Wurlitzer 2/10. Tower Ballroom. Blackpool	03/35
113	When the Cafe Lights Are Low / Phantom of a Song. With Larry Brennan	Zonophone MR	1591	Wurlitzer 2/10. Tower Ballroom. Blackpool	03/35
114	Dixonland No.7	Zonophone MR	1660	Wurlitzer 3/13. Tower Ballroom. Blackpool	05/35
115	Jolly Good Company / Friends. With Larry Brennan	Zonophone MR	1718	Wurlitzer 3/13. Tower Ballroom. Blackpool	06/35
116	Dixonland No.8	Zonophone MR	1696	Wurlitzer 3/13. Tower Ballroom. Blackpool	06/35
117	Dixonland No.8	Zonophone MR	1696	Wurlitzer 3/13. Tower Ballroom. Blackpool	06/35
118	Naughty Marietta Film Selection	Zonophone MR	1695	Wurlitzer 3/13. Tower Ballroom. Blackpool	06/35
119	Pom-Pom / Dancing in a Dream. With Larry Brennan	Zonophone MR	1734	Wurlitzer 3/13. Tower Ballroom. Blackpool	07/35
120	Waltz Memories	Zonophone MR	1731	Wurlitzer 3/13. Tower Ballroom. Blackpool	07/35
121	On with the Show Selection (Vocal chorus by Bob and Alf Pearson)	Rex	8515	Wurlitzer 3/13. Tower Ballroom. Blackpool	07/35
122	Rhapsody in Blue	Rex	8516	Wurlitzer 3/13. Tower Ballroom. Blackpool	07/35
123	Dixon Hits No.1 (Vocal chorus by Bob and Alf Pearson)	Rex	8540	Wurlitzer 3/13. Tower Ballroom. Blackpool	08/35
124	Gold Diggers of 1935 Selection / Sweet Adeline Selection	Zonophone MR	1751	Wurlitzer 3/13. Tower Ballroom. Blackpool	08/35
125	Teddy Bears' Picnic / The Whistler and His Dog	Zonophone MR	1750	Wurlitzer 2/10. Tower Ballroom. Blackpool	08/35
126	Dixon Hits No.1 - Without Vocals	Rex	8541	Wurlitzer 3/13. Tower Ballroom. Blackpool	08/35
127	Roberta Film Selection / Sweet Music Film Selection	Zonophone MR	1774	Wurlitzer 3/13. Tower Ballroom. Blackpool	09/35
128	Dixon Hits No.2	Rex	8568	Wurlitzer 3/13. Tower Ballroom. Blackpool	10/35
129	Selection of Leslie Stuart Songs	Rex	8588	Wurlitzer 3/13. Tower Ballroom. Blackpool	10/35
130	Through Southern Climes Medley	Zonophone MR	1826	Wurlitzer 3/13. Tower Ballroom. Blackpool	10/35
131	The Gondoliers Selection	Zonophone MR	1848	Wurlitzer 2/10. Tower Ballroom. Blackpool	11/35
132	The Parade of the Tin Soldiers / Colonel Bogey	Zonophone MR	1887	Wurlitzer 3/13. Tower Ballroom. Blackpool	12/35
133	Merrie England Selection	Zonophone MR	1940	Wurlitzer 2/10. Tower Ballroom. Blackpool	01/36
134	Dixon Hits No.3	Rex	8615	Wurlitzer 3/13. Tower Ballroom. Blackpool	01/36
135	Dixon Hits No.4	Rex	8662	Wurlitzer 3/13. Tower Ballroom. Blackpool	01/36
136	Martial Moments	Rex	8685	Wurlitzer 3/13. Tower Ballroom. Blackpool	02/36
137	Somebody Stole My Gal / Bugle Call Rag	Rex	8713	Wurlitzer 3/13. Tower Ballroom. Blackpool	03/36
138	Blaze Away! / With Sword and Lance	Zonophone MR	1951	Wurlitzer 3/13. Tower Ballroom. Blackpool	03/36
139	Alice, Where Art Thou? / Evensong	Zonophone MR	2039	Wurlitzer 2/10. Tower Ballroom. Blackpool	04/36
140	Dixon Hits No.5	Rex	8746	Wurlitzer 3/13. Tower Ballroom. Blackpool	04/36
141	Broadway Medley of 1936 / Curly Top Selection	Rex	8732	Wurlitzer 3/13. Tower Ballroom. Blackpool	04/36
142	Dixon Requests Medley	Rex	8771	Wurlitzer 3/13. Tower Ballroom. Blackpool	05/36
143	Dixon Hits No.6	Rex	8795	Wurlitzer 3/13. Tower Ballroom. Blackpool	07/36
144	Dixon Hits No.6	Rex	8795	Wurlitzer 3/13. Tower Ballroom. Blackpool	07/36
145	Dixon Hits No.7	Rex	8831	Wurlitzer 3/13. Tower Ballroom. Blackpool	09/36
146	Waltz Selection	Rex	8838	Wurlitzer 3/13. Tower Ballroom. Blackpool	10/36
147	Dixon Hits No.8	Rex	8880	Wurlitzer 3/13. Tower Ballroom. Blackpool	11/36
148	In a Monastery Garden / In a Persian Market	Rex	8909	Wurlitzer 3/13. Tower Ballroom. Blackpool	12/36
149	Dixon Hits No.9	Rex	8928	Wurlitzer 3/13. Tower Ballroom. Blackpool	01/37
150	Dixon Hits No.10	Rex	8948	Wurlitzer 3/13. Tower Ballroom. Blackpool	02/37
151	Chorus, Gentlemen, Please.	Rex	8971	Wurlitzer 3/13. Tower Ballroom. Blackpool	03/37
152	Dixon Hits No.11	Rex	8979	Wurlitzer 3/13. Tower Ballroom. Blackpool	03/37
153	The Storm	Rex	9000	Wurlitzer 3/13. Tower Ballroom. Blackpool	04/37
154	Dixon Hits No.12	Rex	9021	Wurlitzer 3/13. Tower Ballroom. Blackpool	05/37
155	Irish Medley	Rex	9051	Wurlitzer 3/13. Tower Ballroom. Blackpool	06/37
156	Dixon Hits No.13	Rex	9062	Wurlitzer 3/13. Tower Ballroom. Blackpool	07/37
157	Dixon Hits No.14	Rex	9082	Wurlitzer 3/13. Tower Ballroom. Blackpool	08/37
158	Dixon Hits No.15	Rex	9099	Wurlitzer 3/13. Tower Ballroom. Blackpool	09/37
159	Down the Mall / Bells Across the Meadow	Rex	9122	Wurlitzer 3/13. Tower Ballroom. Blackpool	10/37
160	Rex Cavalcade of 1937	Rex	9159	Wurlitzer 3/13. Tower Ballroom. Blackpool	11/37
161	Dixon Hits No.16	Rex	9148	Wurlitzer 3/13. Tower Ballroom. Blackpool	11/37
162	Gracie Fields Memories	Rex	9169	Wurlitzer 3/13. Tower Ballroom. Blackpool	01/38
163	Dixon Hits No.17	Rex	9194	Wurlitzer 3/13. Tower Ballroom. Blackpool	02/38
164	Dixon Hits No.18	Rex	9218	Wurlitzer 3/13. Tower Ballroom. Blackpool	03/38
165	Dixon Hits No.19	Rex	9242	Wurlitzer 3/13. Tower Ballroom. Blackpool	04/38
166	Dixon Hits No.20	Rex	9263	Wurlitzer 3/13. Tower Ballroom. Blackpool	05/38
167	Dixon Hits No.21	Rex	9286	Wurlitzer 3/13. Tower Ballroom. Blackpool	06/38
168	Dancing Time No.1	Rex	9303	Wurlitzer 3/13. Tower Ballroom. Blackpool	07/38
169	Snow White and the Seven Dwarfs	Rex	9333	Wurlitzer 3/13. Tower Ballroom. Blackpool	08/38
170	Dixon Hits No.22	Rex	9319	Wurlitzer 3/13. Tower Ballroom. Blackpool	08/38
171	Dancing Time No.2	Rex	9341	Wurlitzer 3/13. Tower Ballroom. Blackpool	09/38
172	Dixon Hits No.23	Rex	9366	Wurlitzer 3/13. Tower Ballroom. Blackpool	10/38
173	Dixon Hits No.24	Rex	9391	Wurlitzer 3/13. Tower Ballroom. Blackpool	11/38
174	Dancing Time No.3	Rex	9415	Wurlitzer 3/13. Tower Ballroom. Blackpool	12/38
175	Gracie & Sandy's Party	Rex	8905	Wurlitzer 3/13. Tower Ballroom. Blackpool	01/39
176	Dixon Hits No.25	Rex	9426	Wurlitzer 3/13. Tower Ballroom. Blackpool	01/39
177	Dancing Time No.4	Rex	9448	Wurlitzer 3c/8. Granada Cinema. Clapham Junction	02/39
178	Dixon Hits No.26	Rex	9481	Wurlitzer 3c/8. Granada. Clapham Junction	03/39
179	Dixon Hits No.27	Rex	9495	Wurlitzer 3c/8. Granada Cinema. Clapham Junction	04/39
180	Dancing Time No.5	Rex	9517	Wurlitzer 3c/8. Granada Cinema. Clapham Junction	05/39
181	Dixon Hits No.28	Rex	9535	Wurlitzer 3c/8. Granada Cinema. Clapham Junction	06/39
182	Dixon in Swing Time	Rex	9552	Wurlitzer 3c/8. Granada Cinema. Clapham Junction	07/39
183	Dixontime No.1	Zonophone MR	3082	Wurlitzer 3/13. Tower Ballroom. Blackpool	08/39
184	Dixon Requests No.1	Zonophone MR	3104	Wurlitzer 3/13. Tower Ballroom. Blackpool	09/39
185	Boléro / Sunrise Serenade	Zonophone MR	3123	Wurlitzer 3/13. Tower Ballroom. Blackpool	10/39
186	Gypsiana	Zonophone MR	3148	Wurlitzer 3/13. Tower Ballroom. Blackpool	11/39
187	Dixontime No.2	Zonophone MR	3162	Wurlitzer 3/10. Granada Cinema. Kingston	12/39
188	Sanctuary of the Heart / Land of Hope and Glory	Rex	3211	Wurlitzer 3/10. Granada Cinema. Kingston	02/40
189	Dixontime No.3	Rex	3236	Wurlitzer 4/14. Granada Cinema. Tooting	03/40
190	Gulliver's Travels	Zonophone MR	3235	Wurlitzer 4/14. Granada Cinema. Tooting	03/40
191	Pinocchio Film Selection	Zonophone MR	3247	Wurlitzer 3/8. Granada Cinema. Welling	04/40
192	Sousa March Medley	Zonophone MR	3271	Wurlitzer 3/8. Granada Cinema. Welling	05/40
193	Dixontime No.4	Zonophone MR	3302	Wurlitzer 4/14. Granada Cinema. Tooting	06/40
194	The Skate's Waltz / Love Parade Selection	Zonophone MR	3312	Wurlitzer 4/14. Granada Cinema. Tooting	07/40
195	Dixontime No.5	Zonophone MR	3336	Wurlitzer 3/13. Tower Ballroom. Blackpool	09/40
196	Strict Tempo Medley No.2 Quicksteps/No.2 Foxtrots	Zonophone MR	3348	Wurlitzer 3/13. Tower Ballroom. Blackpool	10/40
197	Stephen Foster Medley	Zonophone MR	3363	Wurlitzer 3/13. Tower Ballroom. Blackpool	11/40
198	Dixontime No.6	Zonophone MR	3366	Wurlitzer 3/13. Tower Ballroom. Blackpool	11/40
199	The Doll Medley	Zonophone MR	3385	Wurlitzer 3/13. Tower Ballroom. Blackpool	12/40
200	Classics of Jazz (Blues Medley)	Zonophone MR	3400	Wurlitzer 3/13. Tower Ballroom. Blackpool	01/41
201	Orpheus in the Underworld	Zonophone MR	3424	Wurlitzer 3/13. Tower Ballroom. Blackpool	02/41
202	Dixontime No.7	Zonophone MR	3440	Compton 3/8. EMI Studios	03/41
203	Waltzland Selection	Zonophone MR	3442	Compton 3/8. EMI Studios	04/41
204	Dixontime No.8	Zonophone MR	3464	Compton 3/8. EMI Studios	05/41
205	Old Timers	Zonophone MR	3473	Compton 3/8. EMI Studios	06/41
206	Barcarolle / Jolly Brothers	Zonophone MR	3483	Compton 3/8. EMI Studios	07/41
207	That Night in Rio / Spring Parade Selection	Zonophone MR	3503	Compton 3/8. EMI Studios	08/41
208	Dixontime No.9	Zonophone MR	3518	Compton 3/8. EMI Studios	09/41
209	The Dream of the Waltz	Zonophone MR	3524	Compton 3/8. EMI Studios	10/41
210	Dixontime No.10	Zonophone MR	3545	Wurlitzer 3/8. Granada Cinema. Slough	11/41
211	Tauber Memories	Zonophone MR	3564	Wurlitzer 3/8. Granada Cinema. Slough	12/41
212	Waltzing with Strauss	Zonophone MR	3568	Wurlitzer 3/8. Granada Cinema. Slough	01/42
213	Classics of Swing	Zonophone MR	3586	Wurlitzer 3/8. Granada Cinema. Slough	02/42
214	Dixontime No.11	Zonophone MR	3611	Wurlitzer 3/8 . Granada Cinema. Slough	03/42
215	Dixon Requests No.2	Zonophone MR	3615	Wurlitzer 3/8. Granada Cinema. Slough	04/42
216	Dixontime No.12	Zonophone MR	3625	Wurlitzer 3/8 . Granada Cinema. Slough	05/42
217	Medley of British Patriotic Songs / Medley of Soviet Patriotic Songs	Zonophone MR	3630	Wurlitzer 3/8. Granada Cinema. Slough	06/42
218	Dixontime No.13	Zonophone MR	3636	Compton 3/8. EMI Studios	07/42
219	Blossom Time Selection	Zonophone MR	3641	Compton 3/8. EMI Studios	08/42
220	Finlandia	Zonophone MR	3742	Wurlitzer 3/13. Tower Ballroom. Blackpool	11/42
221	Dixontime No.14	Zonophone MR	3664	Compton 3/8. EMI Studios	11/42
222	Estudiantina / Mon Bijou	Zonophone MR	3668	Compton 3/8. EMI Studios	12/42
223	Yankee Doodle Dandy Film Selection	Zonophone MR	3675	Compton 3/8. EMI Studios	02/43
224	Dixontime No.15	Zonophone MR	3683	Compton 3/8. EMI Studios	03/43
225	Tchaikowsky Selection	Zonophone MR	3690	Compton 3/8. EMI Studios	05/43
226	Rustle of Spring / Automne	Zonophone MR	3698	Moller 5/27. Llandudno.	07/43
227	Melodies from Schubert	Zonophone MR	3706	Compton 3/8. EMI Studios	08/43
228	Melodies from Mendelssohn	Zonophone MR	3711	Compton 3/8. EMI Studios	10/43
229	Dixontime No.16	Zonophone MR	3713	Compton 3/8. EMI Studios	11/43
230	Jerome Kern Medley / Cole Porter Medley	Zonophone MR	3719	Compton 3/8. EMI Studios	12/43
231	Dixontime No.17	Zonophone MR	3734	Compton 3/8. EMI Studios	07/44
232	Romberg Reminiscences	Zonophone MR	3740	Compton 3/8. EMI Studios	10/44
233	Shine on Harvest Moon / When Irish Eyes Are Smiling	Zonophone MR	3748	Compton 3/8. EMI Studios	02/45
234	Die Fledermaus	Zonophone MR	3752	Compton 3/8. EMI Studios	04/45
235	Melody Moments No.1	Columbia FB	3279	Wurlitzer 3/13. Tower Ballroom. Blackpool	02/47
236	Teddy Bear's Picnic / Parade of the Tin Soldiers	Columbia FB	3294	Wurlitzer 3/13. Tower Ballroom. Blackpool	05/47
237	Melody Moments No.2	Columbia FB	3338	Wurlitzer 3/13. Tower Ballroom. Blackpool	10/47
238	Jolly Brothers Waltz / Moonlight Serenade	Columbia FB	3350	Wurlitzer 3/13. Tower Ballroom. Blackpool	11/47
239	The Green Cockatoo / Tico Tico	Columbia FB	3362	Wurlitzer 3/13. Tower Ballroom. Blackpool	01/48
240	Melody Moments No.3	Columbia FB	3385	Wurlitzer 3/13. Tower Ballroom. Blackpool	03/48
241	Tango Selection	Columba FB	3392	Wurlitzer 3/13. Tower Ballroom. Blackpool	05/48
242	Melody Moments No.4	Columbia FB	3428	Wurlitzer 3/13. Tower Ballroom. Blackpool	10/48
243	Christmas Carol Selection	Columbia FB	3438	Wurlitzer 3/13. Tower Ballroom. Blackpool	12/48
244	Melody Moments No.5	Columbia FB	3464	Wurlitzer 3/13. Opera House. Blackpool	03/49
245	Easter Parade Selection	Columbia FB	3471	Wurlitzer 3/13. Opera House. Blackpool	04/49
246	I Do Like to Be Beside the Seaside Medley	Columbia FB	3516	Wurlitzer 3/13. Opera House. Blackpool	09/49
247	Handel's Largo / Intermezzo - Cavalleria Rusticana	Columbia FB	3527	Wurlitzer 3/13. Opera House. Blackpool	11/49
248	Melody Moments No.6	Columbia FB	3548	Wurlitzer 3/13. Tower Ballroom. Blackpool	03/50
249	Berceuse De Jocelyn / Meditation - Thais	Columbia FB	3572	Wurlitzer 3/13. Tower Ballroom. Blackpool	09/50
250	Dancing at the Tower No.1	Columbia FB	3578	Wurlitzer 3/13. Tower Ballroom. Blackpool	10/50
251	Hit Parade Medley No.1	Columbia FB	3582	Wurlitzer 3/13. Tower Ballroom. Blackpool	11/50
252	Dancing at the Tower Medley No.2	Columbia FB	3587	Wurlitzer 3/13. Tower Ballroom. Blackpool	12/50
253	Dancing at the Tower Medley No.3	Columbia FB	3600	Wurlitzer 3/13. Tower Ballroom. Blackpool	03/51
254	Jungle Fantasy / Buzzing Bees	Columbia FB	3604	Wurlitzer 3/13. Tower Ballroom. Blackpool	05/51
256	Samum	Columbia FB	3607	Wurlitzer 3/13. Tower Ballroom. Blackpool	06/51
257	Dancing at the Tower No.4	Columbia FB	3610	Wurlitzer 3/13. Tower Ballroom. Blackpool	07/51
258	Wilfred Pickles Sing-Song	Columba DX	1772	Wurlitzer 3/13. Tower Ballroom. Blackpool	08/51
259	Dancing at the Tower No.5	Columbia FB	3621	Wurlitzer 3/13. Tower Ballroom. Blackpool	11/51
260	Dancing at the Tower No.6	Columbia FB	3624	Wurlitzer 3/13. Tower Ballroom. Blackpool	12/51
261	Dancing at the Tower Medley No.7	Columbia FB	3636	Wurlitzer 3/13. Tower Ballroom. Blackpool	04/52
262	Dancing at the Tower No.8	Columbia FB	3642	Wurlitzer 3/13. Tower Ballroom. Blackpool	05/52
263	Quickstep Medley of Jolson Songs	Columbia FB	3646	Wurlitzer 3/13. Tower Ballroom. Blackpool	07/52
264	Blue Tango / Blackpool Bounce	Columbia FB	3654	Wurlitzer 3/13. Tower Ballroom. Blackpool	09/52
265	Old Time Seaside Saunters / Old Time Selection of Joyce Waltzes	Columbia FB	3657	Wurlitzer 3/13. Tower Ballroom. Blackpool	10/52
267	Dancing at the Tower No.9	Columbia FB	3670	Wurlitzer 3/13. Tower Ballroom. Blackpool	03/53
268	Dancing at the Tower No.10	Columbia FB	3674	Wurlitzer 3/13. Tower Ballroom. Blackpool	04/53
269	Popular Medley of Waltzes / Popular Medley of Quicksteps	Columbia FB	3675	Compton 3/8. EMI Studios	05/53
270	Dancing at the Tower No.11	Columbia FB	3680	Wurlitzer 3/13. Tower Ballroom. Blackpool	06/53
271	When You Hear Big Ben / Queen of Everyone's Heart - With Joseph Locke	Columbia DB	3320	Wurlitzer 3/13. Tower Ballroom. Blackpool	08/53
272	Gilbert and Sullivan Selection	Columbia FB	3683	Wurlitzer 3/13. Tower Ballroom. Blackpool	08/53
273	Dancing at the Tower No.12	Columbia FB	3689	Wurlitzer 3/13. Tower Ballroom. Blackpool	10/53
274	The King and I selection	Columbia FB	3692	Wurlitzer 3/13. Tower Ballroom. Blackpool	11/53
275	Desert Song Selection	Columbia FB	3698	Wurlitzer 3/13. Tower Ballroom. Blackpool	01/54
276	March Medley	Columbia FB	3695	Wurlitzer 3/13. Tower Ballroom. Blackpool	01/54
277	Dancing to Dixon No.1	Columbia FB	3703	Compton 3/8. EMI Studios	02/54
278	Dancing to Dixon No.2	Columbia FB	3707	Compton 3/8. EMI Studios	03/54
279	Dancing at the Tower No.13	Columbia FB	3706	Wurlitzer 3/13. Tower Ballroom. Blackpool	06/54
280	Dancing at the Tower No.14	Columbia FB	3718	Wurlitzer 3/13. Tower Ballroom. Blackpool	09/54
281	Rose Marie Selection	Columbia FB	3719	Wurlitzer 3/13. Tower Ballroom. Blackpool	10/54
282	Student Prince Selection	Columbia FB	3720	Wurlitzer 3/13. Tower Ballroom. Blackpool	10/54
283	Singing at the Tower	Columbia FB	3725	Wurlitzer 3/13. Tower Ballroom. Blackpool	11/54
284	Dancing at the Tower No.15	Columbia FB	3732	Wurlitzer 3/13. Tower Ballroom. Blackpool	02/55
285	Deep in My Heart Selection	Columbia FB	3733	Wurlitzer 3/13. Tower Ballroom. Blackpool	03/55
286	Storm at Sea	Columbia FB	3741	Wurlitzer 3/13. Tower Ballroom. Blackpool	05/55
287	Dancing at the Tower No.16	Columbia FB	3744	Wurlitzer 3/13. Tower Ballroom. Blackpool	06/55
288	Dancing at the Tower No.17	Columbia FB	3747	Wurlitzer 3/13. Tower Ballroom. Blackpool	07/55
289	Dancing at the Tower No.18	Columbia FB	3752	Wurlitzer 3/13. Tower Ballroom. Blackpool	09/55
290	Gay Gordons Medley	Columbia DB	3684	Wurlitzer 3/13. Tower Ballroom. Blackpool	11/55
291	Benny Goodman Story	Columbia DB	3736	Wurlitzer 3/13. Tower Ballroom. Blackpool	03/56
292	Dancing at the Tower No.19	Columbia DB	3792	Wurlitzer 3/13. Tower Ballroom. Blackpool	07/56
293	Dancing at the Tower / St Bernards Waltz	Columbia DB	3842	Wurlitzer 3/13. Tower Ballroom. Blackpool	11/56
294	Dancing at the Tower No.20	Columbia DB	3842	Wurlitzer 3/13. Tower Ballroom. Blackpool	11/56
295	Medley of Quicksteps / Medley of Foxtrots	Columbia DB	3899	Wurlitzer 3/13. Opera House. Blackpool	03/57
296	Happy Holiday	Columbia DB	3946	Wurlitzer 3/13. Opera House. Blackpool	05/57
297	Quickstep Medley / Waltz Medley	Columbia DB	3989	Wurlitzer 3/13. Opera House. Blackpool.	09/57
298	Barn Dance Medley	Columbia DB	4044	Wurlitzer 3/13. Opera House. Blackpool	12/57
299	Quickstep Medley / Foxtrot Medley	Columbia DB	4045	Wurlitzer 3/13. Opera House. Blackpool	01/58
