= Mechanical organ =

Musical organ that is self-playing

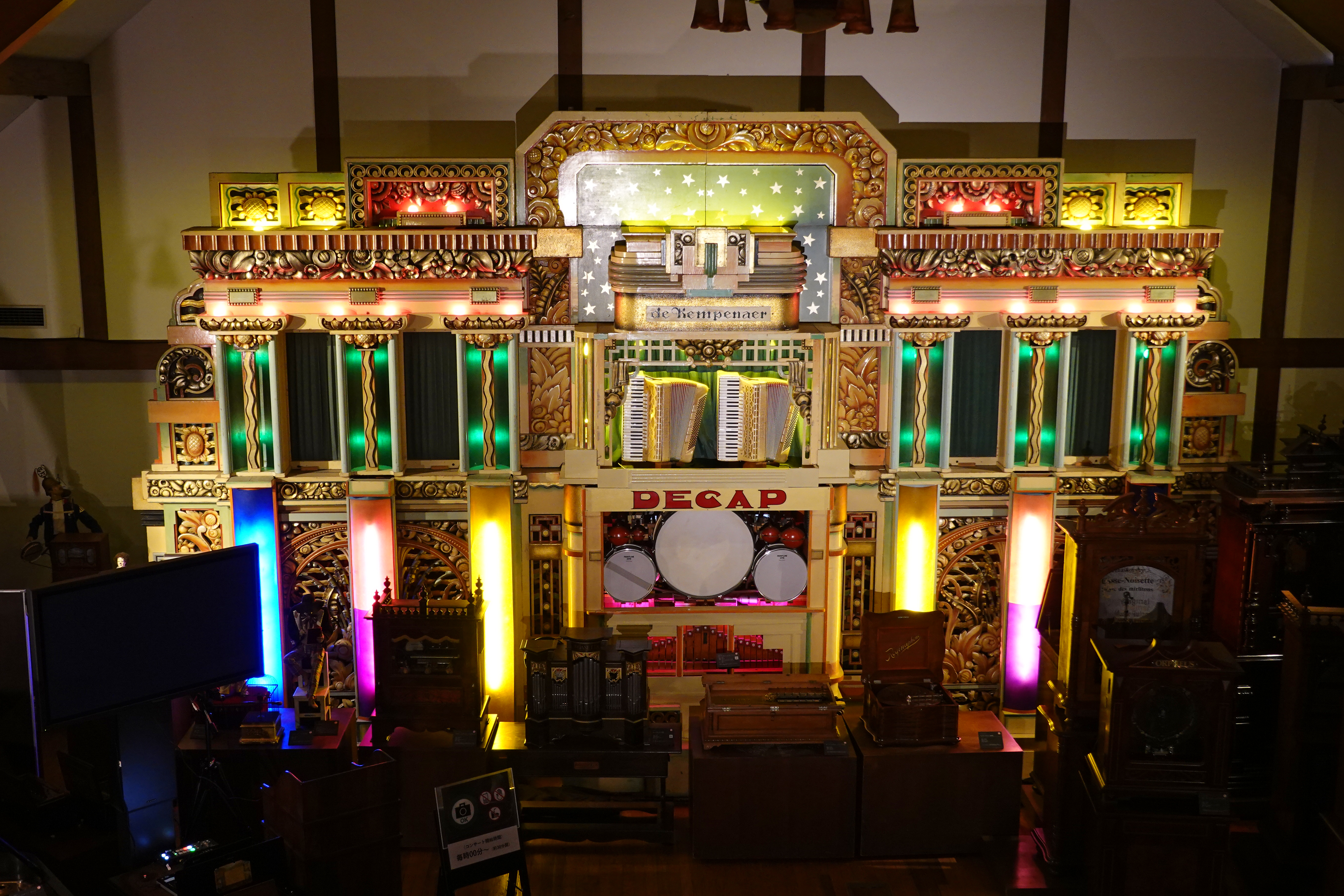
Decap Dance Organ "De Kempenaer" (built 1938 by Gebr. Decap, Antwerp) at the Rokko Forest Sound Museum in Kobe, Japan

A mechanical organ is a self-playing instrument, as opposed to manual playing by a musician. These organs are traditionally powered by a single shaft, located at the side of the organ case. The axle is attached to a wheel, which can be powered from a variety of sources. Common ones include hand-cranking, electric motors, and steam engines.

Mechanical organs produce sound using an abundance of different methods. Some instruments utilize a set of reeds, similar to those found in a harmonium or reed organ.

The first mechanical organs, barrel organs, implemented a pinned cylinder music encoding system, similarly to a musical box. The system only allows for a limited number of short songs. Cylinders are also difficult to change, requiring heavy lifting.

To combat this, in the 1890s, builders started integrating book music into their instruments. This approach allows for an unlimited number of infinitely long songs.

Around the same time, music rolls made their way into the mainstream industry. These are similar to barrels in terms of musical capacity, but are much easier to change. Many German and American organ manufacturers would begin installing roll-frames into their organs. This feature allows them to play rolls. The downside of rolls is the necessity to rewind them when finished, which can be a lengthy process.

Starting in the 1950’s, European organ-makers, namely Decap, started switching to electronic tone generators to synthesize their organs’ sounds. This approach was much more cost effective and light on resources following World War One and Two.

Starting in the late 1980’s, the rise of MIDI technology presented a new opportunity for organ-builders. MIDI control is now a common feature in mechanical organs.

== In popular culture ==
In the movie The Great Race (1965) Professor Fate, with bandaged thumbs, is shown pretending to play a mechanical organ.

== See also ==
- Barrel piano
- Barrel organ
- Componium
- Dance organ
- Fairground organ
- Musical clock
- Musical box
- Orchestrion
- Organ grinder
- Piano roll
- Player piano
- Reproducing piano
- Serinette
- Street organ
