= Casa de los Gatos =

Animal shelter in Valencia, Spain

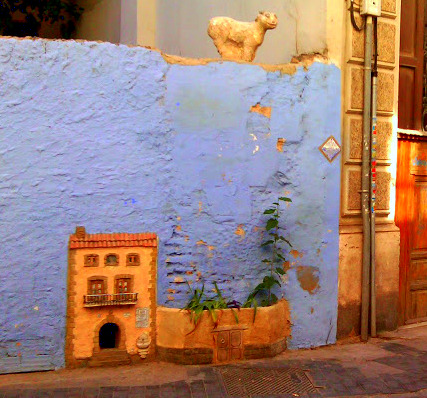

The Casa de los Gatos or Casa dels Gats is an animal shelter in Valencia, Spain. Its house-shaped facade was made by artist Alfonso Yuste Navarro in 2003.

== Description ==
The site is located at number 9 Carrer del Museu in El Carmen (Valencia). A similar site existed at number 15, until a building was built in its place. Artist Alfonso Yuste Navarro had his workshop at number 6 and noticed a group of cats entering his lot through a hole. With the neighbours' permission, he began work on a house-shaped facade around the hole.

Yuste used ceramics, marble and parts of a shopping trolley to make the facade. Referring to the legend that Christian knight El Cid banished cats from Valencia for superstitious reasons after taking the city from Muslims, and only four survived to repopulate the city, there is an inscription in the language known locally as Valencian: "A la memoria dels cuatre gats que quedaren al Barri del Carme l’any MXCIV. Mai se les va a sentir un miau mes alt que altre" (In memory of the four cats who remained in neighbourhood of El Carmen in the year [1094]. You will never hear one meow louder than another". There is also a plaque stating that the building is insured against fire, and an ornamental fountain. There is also a portrait of Charlie Chaplin.

Behind the facade, there is a strawberry plant and some sculptures. Yuste kept three chickens there, but he gave them away as they did not get on well with cats. The wall housing the facade is topped with a sculpture of a goat, in reference to an old Gitano performance of having a goat climb a ladder while a man played a barrel organ.

== Vandalism and repair ==
In November 2023, the artwork received its first serious vandalism in its 20 years of existence, being tagged with red spray paint during the night. Yuste repaired the damage the following month.

== Gallery ==
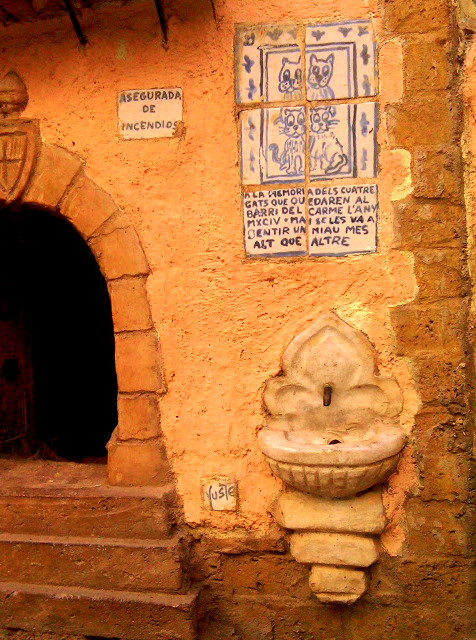
Facade. Visible are the fountain, fire insurance plaque, and inscription to the legendary cats of 1094.

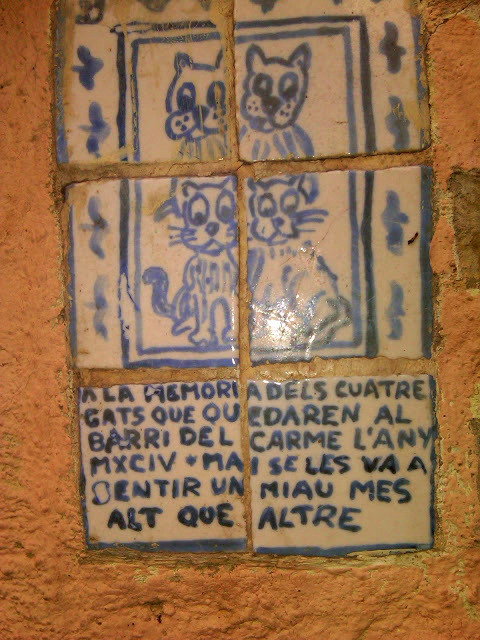
Inscription to the legendary cats of 1094.
