= Barrel organ =

Mechanical musical instrument

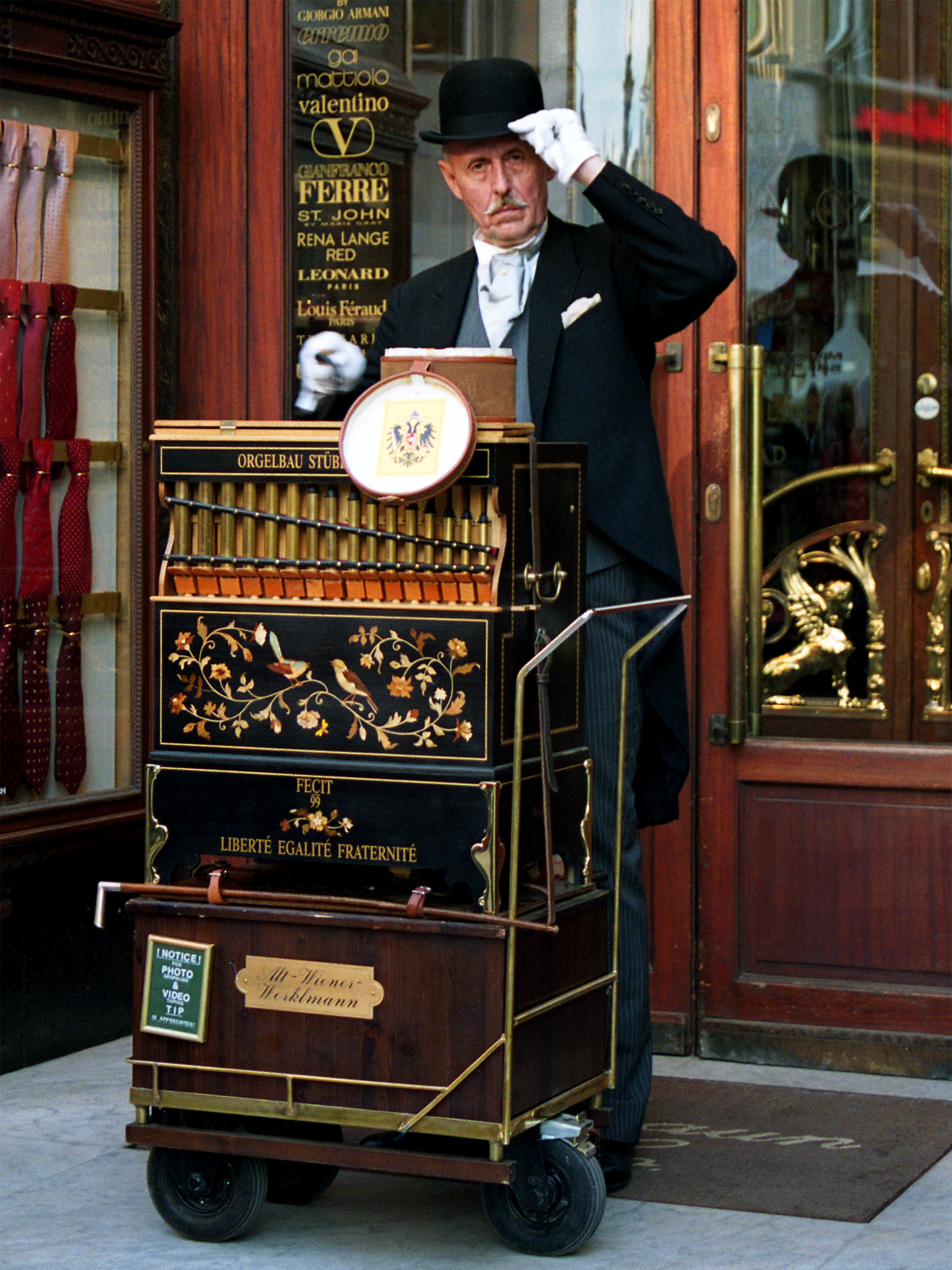
A barrel organ player in Vienna, Austria

Barrel organ
A barrel organ being played in Mexico City

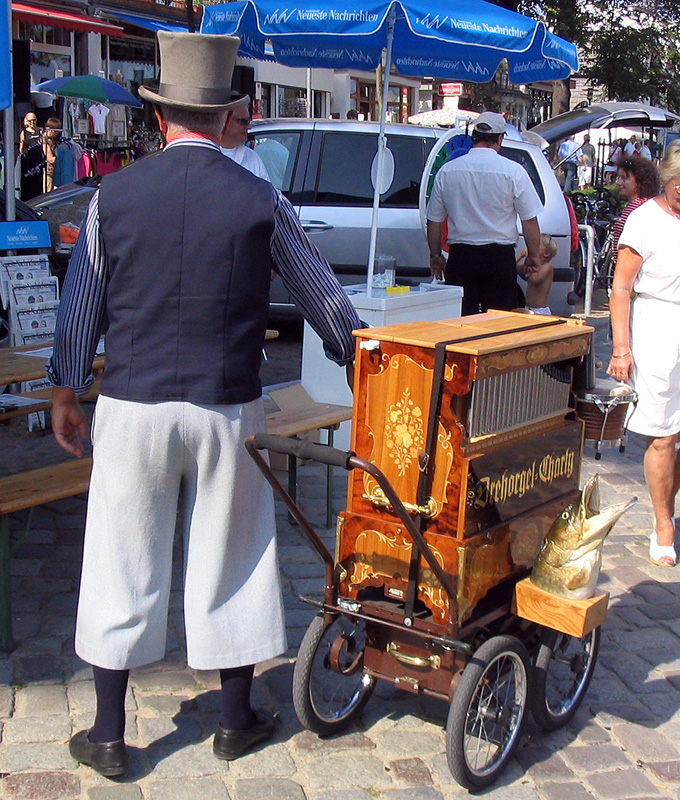
A barrel organ player in Warnemünde, Mecklenburg-Vorpommern, Germany

A barrel organ (also called roller organ or crank organ) is a French mechanical musical instrument consisting of bellows and one or more ranks of pipes housed in a case, usually of wood, and often highly decorated. The basic principle is the same as a traditional pipe organ, but rather than being played by an organist, the barrel organ is powered by either a person turning a crank, or by clockwork driven by weights or springs. The music is encoded onto wooden barrels (cylinders) using pins. The pins strike levers which are analogous to the keyboard of the traditional pipe organ. A person (or in some cases, a trained animal) who plays a barrel organ is known as an organ grinder.

== Terminology ==
There are many names for the barrel organ, such as hand organ, cylinder organ, box organ (though that can also mean a positive organ), street organ, grinder organ, and Low Countries organ.

In French names include orgue à manivelle ("crank organ") and orgue de Barbarie ("Barbary organ"); German names include Drehorgel ("crank organ"), Leierkasten ("brace box"), and Walzenorgel ("cylinder organ"); Hungarian names include verkli (from Austrian-German Werkl), sípláda ("whistle chest") and kintorna (from Bayern-Austrian "Kinterne"); Italian names include organetto a manovella ("crank organ") and organo tedesco ("German organ"); the Finnish name is posetiivi ("positive", from Latin positus, set on place); the Polish name is katarynka.

However, several of these names include types of mechanical organs for which the music is encoded as book music or by holes on a punched paper tape instead of by pins on a barrel. While many of these terms refer to the physical operation of the crank, some refer to an exotic origin. The French name orgue de Barbarie, suggesting barbarians, has been explained as a corruption of, variously, the terms bara ("bread") and gwen ("wine") in the Breton language, the surname of an early barrel-organ manufacturer from Modena, Giovanni Barberi, or that of the English inventor John Burberry.

The term hurdy-gurdy is sometimes mistakenly applied to a small, portable barrel organ that was frequently played by organ grinders and buskers (street musicians), but the two terms should not be confused. Although the hurdy-gurdy is also powered by a crank and often used by street performers, it produces sound with a rosin-covered wheel rotated against tuned strings. Another key difference is that the hurdy-gurdy player is free to play any tune he or she desires, while the barrel organist is generally confined to pre-programmed tunes.

Some also confuse the barrel organ with the steam organ or calliope. In the United Kingdom barrel pianos, particularly those played in the streets, are frequently called barrel organs.

== Barrel ==
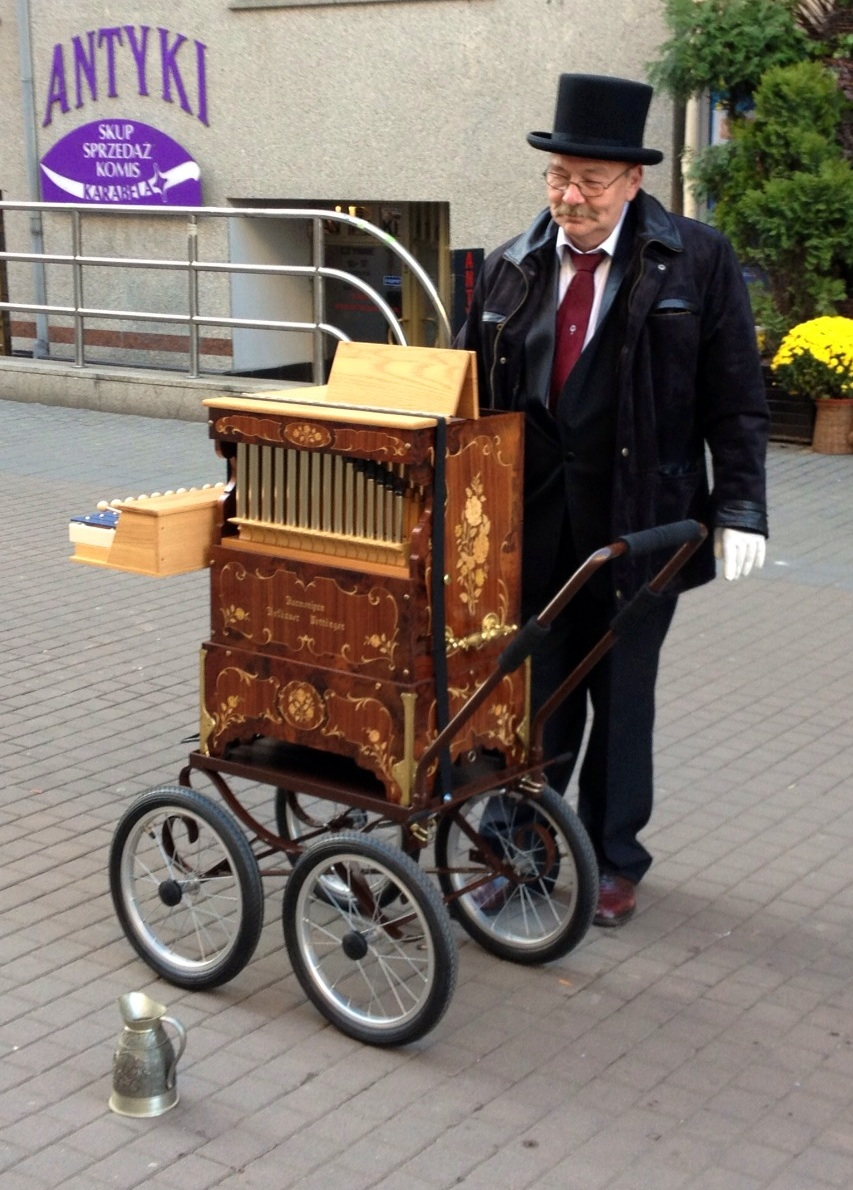
A barrel organ player in Katowice, Poland

The pieces of music (or tunes) are encoded onto the barrel using metal pins and staples. Pins are used for short notes, and staples of varying lengths for longer notes. Each barrel usually carried several different tunes. Pinning such barrels was something of an art form, and the quality of the music produced by a barrel organ is largely a function of the quality of its pinning.

The organ barrels must be sturdy to maintain precise alignment over time, since they play the same programming role as music rolls and have to endure significant mechanical strain. Damage to the barrel, such as warpage, would have a direct (and usually detrimental) effect on the music produced.

The size of the barrel will depend on the number of notes in the organ and the length of the tune to be played. The more notes, the longer the barrel. The longer the tune, the greater the diameter.

Since the music is hard-coded onto the barrel, the only way for a barrel organ to play a different set of tunes is to replace the barrel with another one. While not a difficult operation, barrels are unwieldy and expensive, so many organ grinders have only one barrel for their instrument.

== Operation ==
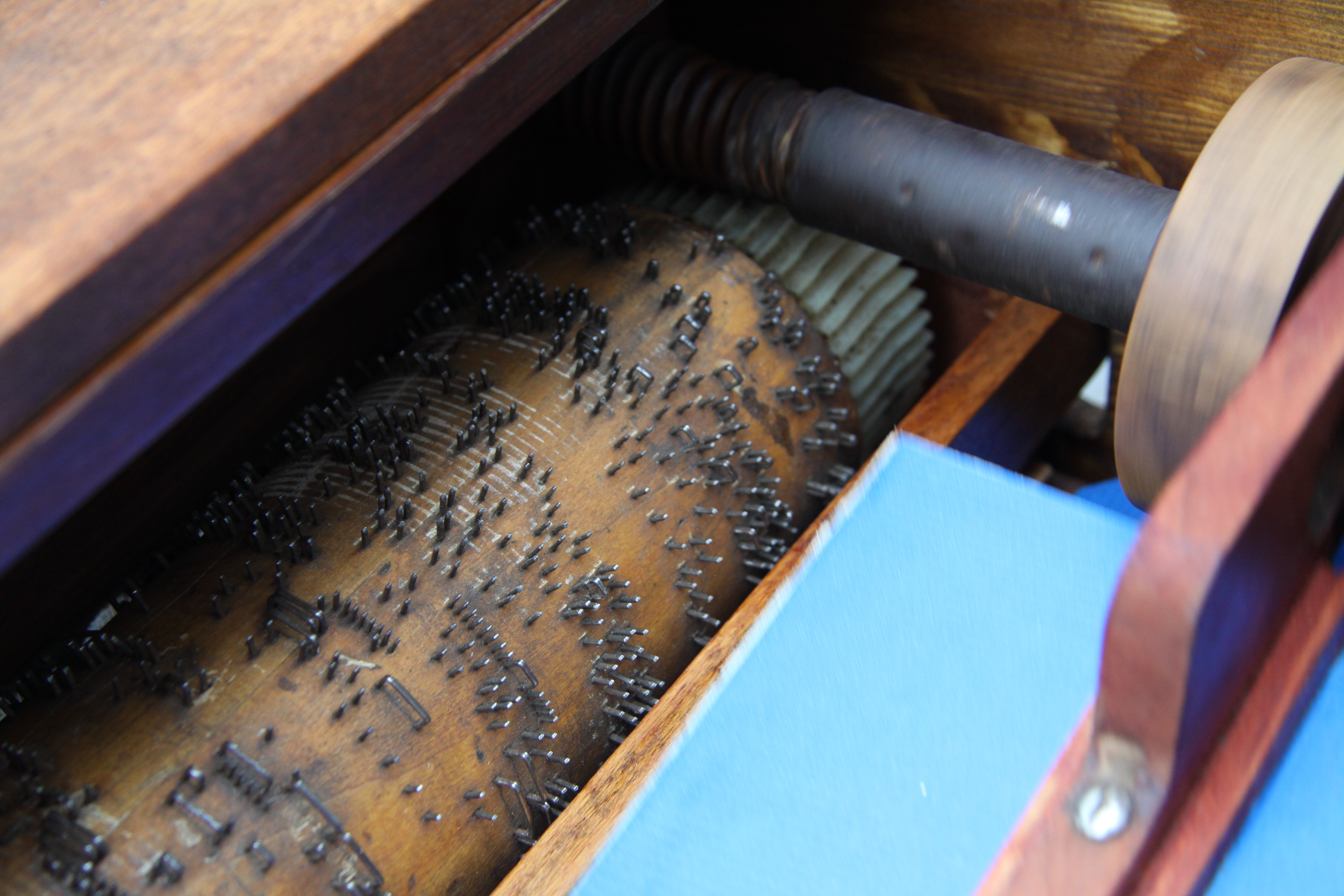
Detail of inner part of barrel organ

A set of levers called keys is positioned just above the surface of the barrel. Each key corresponds to one pitch. A rod is connected to the rear of each key. The other end of the rod is a metal pin which operates a valve within the wind chest. When the instrument is played (by turning the crank), offsets on the crank shaft cause bellows to open and close to produce pressurized air. A reservoir/regulator maintains a constant pressure. A worm gear on the crank shaft causes the barrel to rotate slowly and its pins and staples lift the fronts of the keys. This causes the other end of the key to press down on the end of the rod which, in turn, activates the valve and allows air from the bellows to pass into the corresponding pipe.

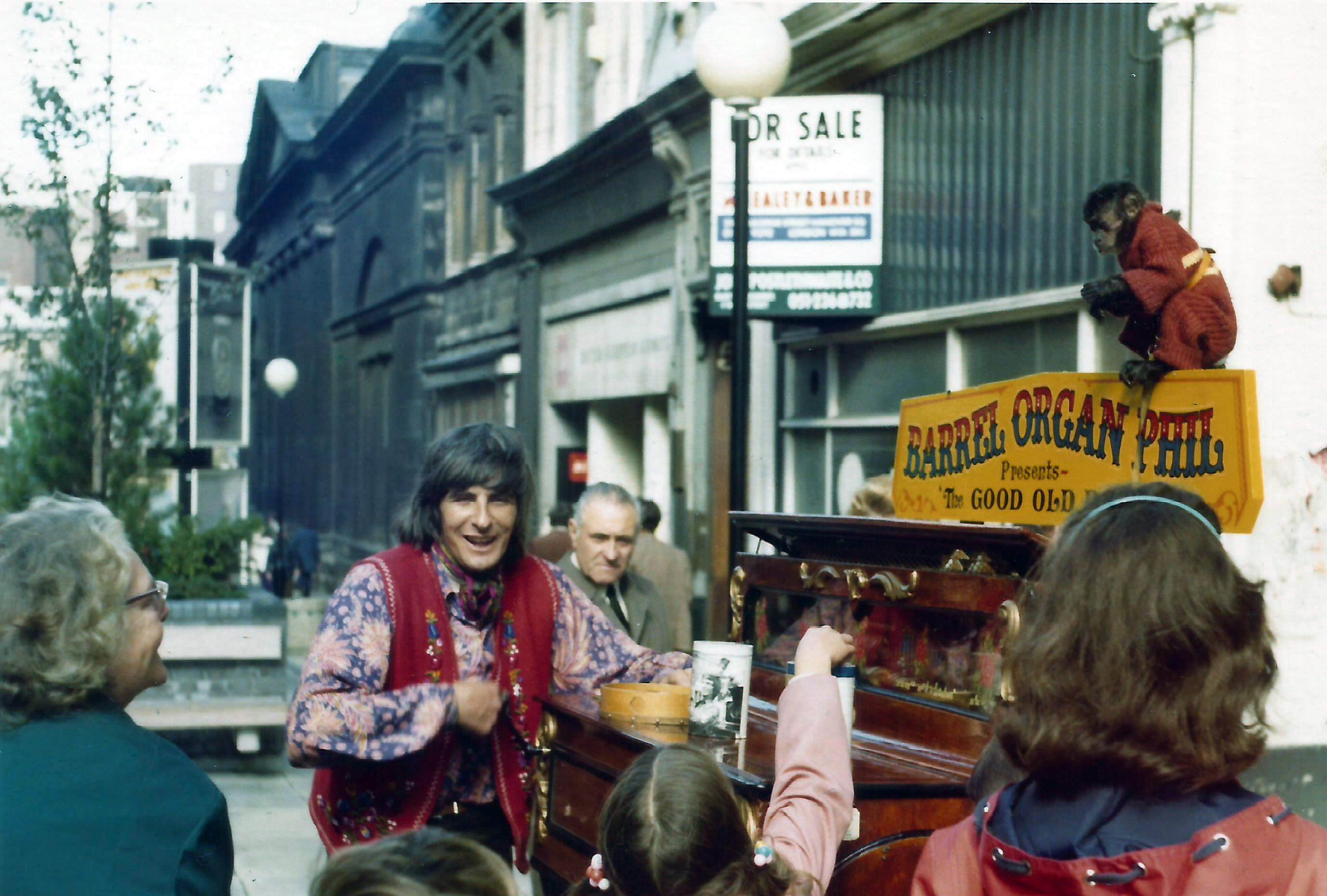
A barrel organ player, with pet monkey, in Liverpool, England

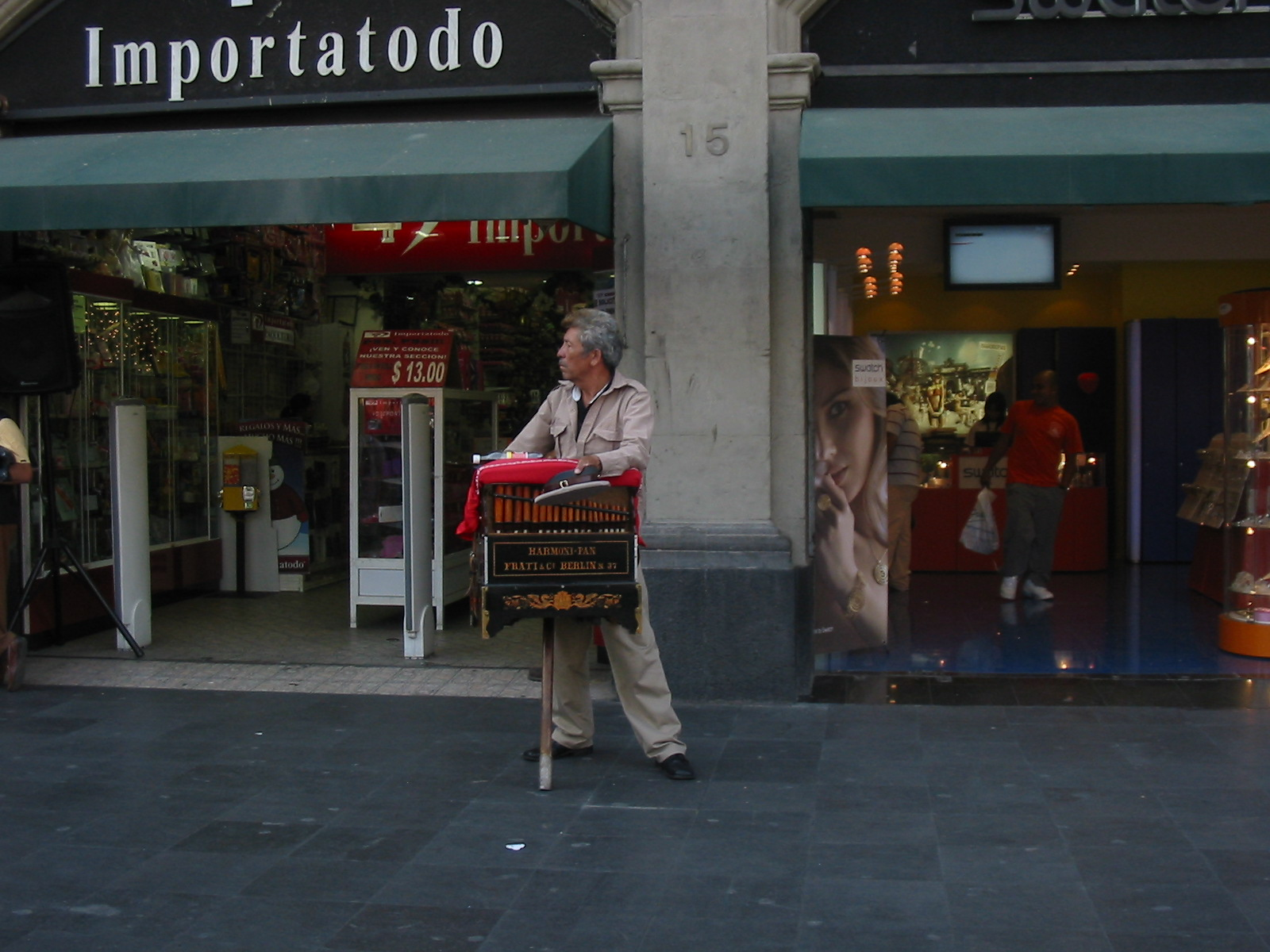
A barrel organ player in Mexico City just off the Zócalo or main plaza

To allow different tunes to be played from one barrel, the barrel can be moved laterally to bring a different set of pins and staples under the keys. Street barrel organs usually play 7 to 9 tunes, although small organs (usually the older ones) can play up to 15 tunes. Less commonly (and usually for large orchestrions) the pinning will form one continuous spiral and the barrel will be gradually moved as it rotates so that the pins remain lined up with the keys. In this case, each barrel plays only one long tune.

== Usage ==
The barrel organ was the traditional instrument of organ grinders. With a few exceptions, organ grinders used one of the smaller, more portable versions of the barrel organ, containing perhaps one (or just a few) rank(s) of pipes and only 7 to 9 tunes. Use of these organs was limited by their weight. Most weighed 25 to 50 pounds but some were as heavy as 100 pounds.

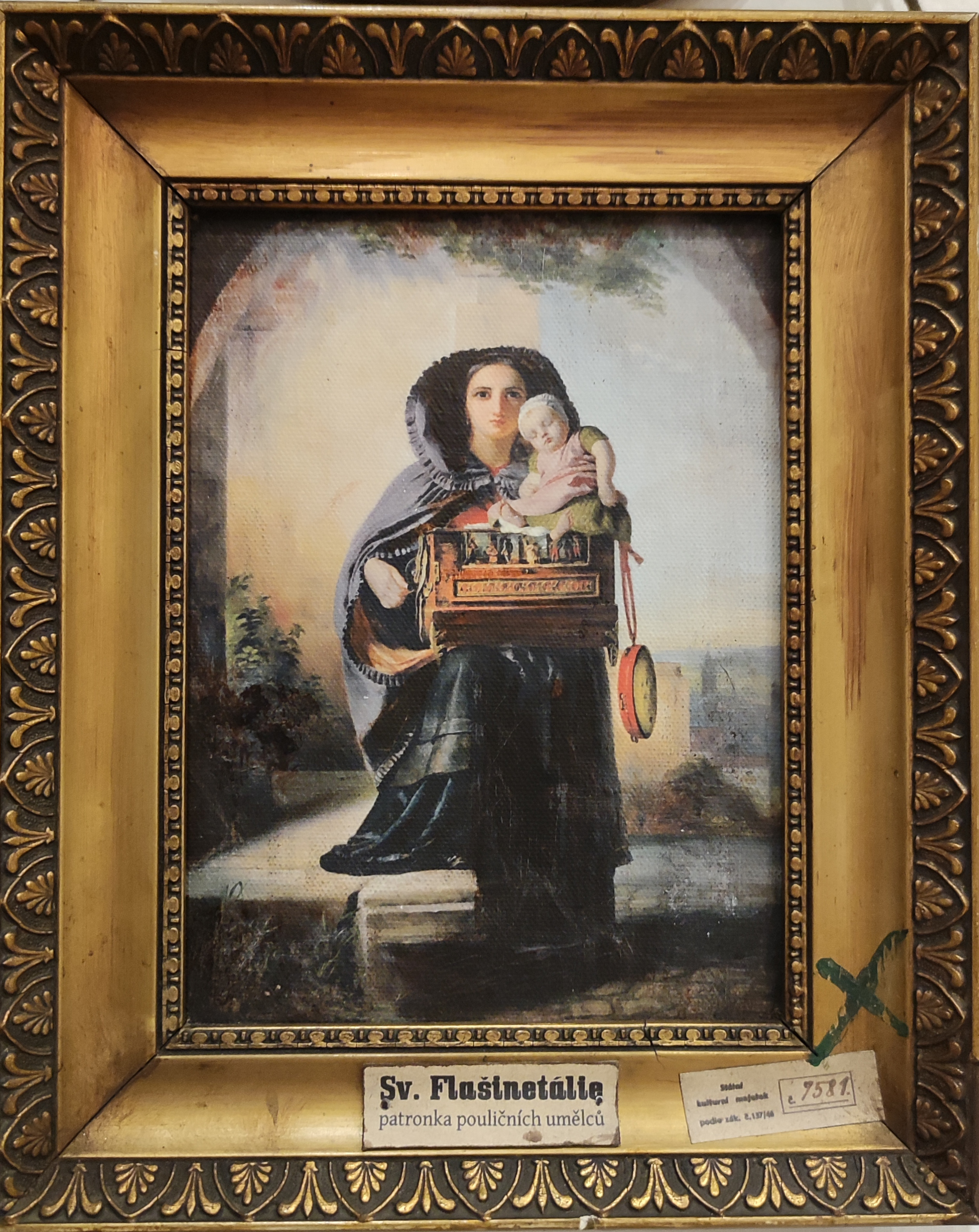
Saint Flashinetalia (Czech: Flašinetálie, from flašinet, "barrel organ"), fictitious patroness of Organ Grinders, Prague, Czech Republic

There were many larger versions located in churches, fairgrounds, music halls, and other large establishments such as sports arenas and theaters. The large barrel organs were often powered by very heavy weights and springs, like a more powerful version of a longcase clock. They could also be hydraulically powered, with a turbine or waterwheel arrangement giving the mechanical force to turn the barrel and pump the bellows. The last barrel organs were electrically powered, or converted to electrical power. Eventually, many large barrel organs had their barrel actions removed and were converted to play a different format of music, such as cardboard books or paper rolls.

== Combined barrel and manually played instruments ==
Especially in churches, some large barrel organs were built as "barrel and finger" organs. Such instruments are furnished with a normal organ keyboard, in addition to the automatic mechanism, making it possible to play them by hand when a human organist is available. The barrels were often out of sight.

At the beginning of the 20th century, large barrel organs intended for use as fairground organs or street organs were often converted, or newly built, to play music rolls or book music rather than barrels. This allows a much greater variety of melodies to be played.

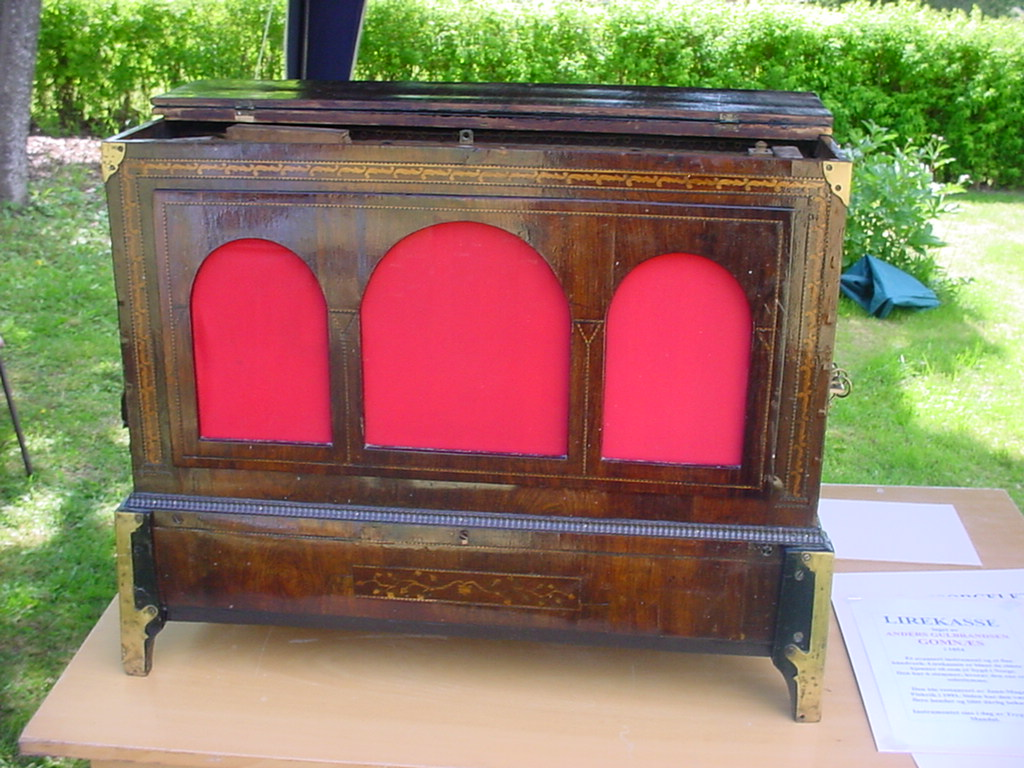
Barrel organ made by Anders Gulbrandsen Gomnæs, Hønefoss, Norway, in 1854

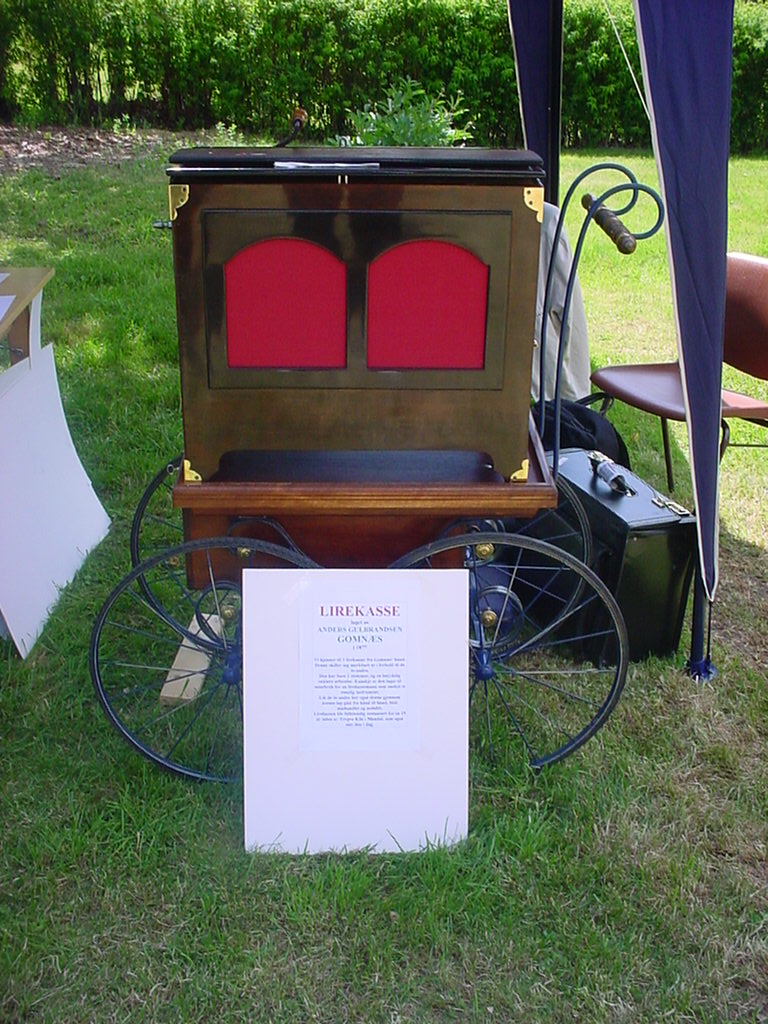
Barrel organ made by Anders Gulbrandsen Gomnæs, Hønefoss, Norway, in 1877

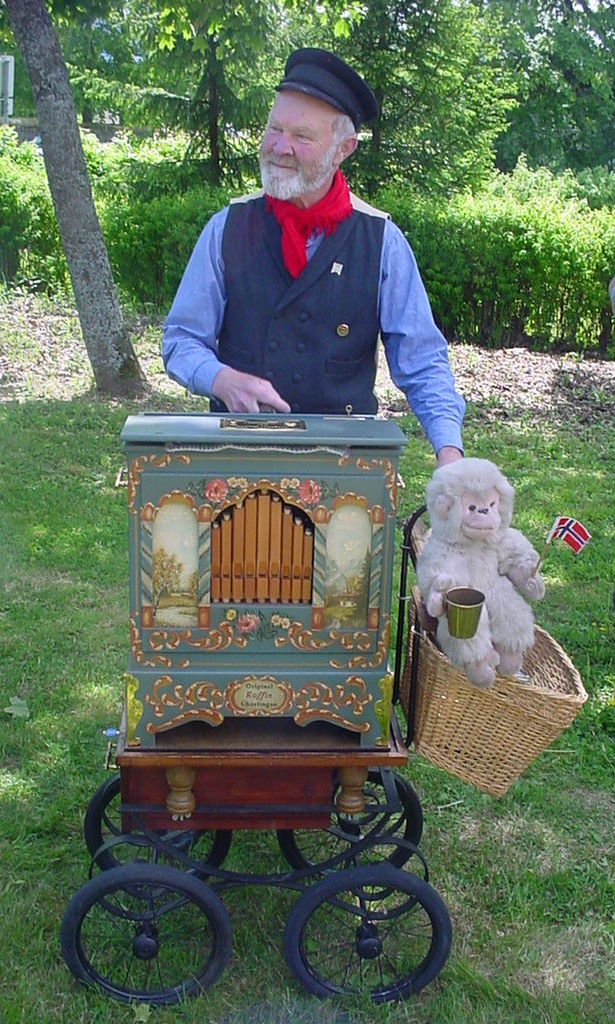
Organ grinder playing a new barrel organ

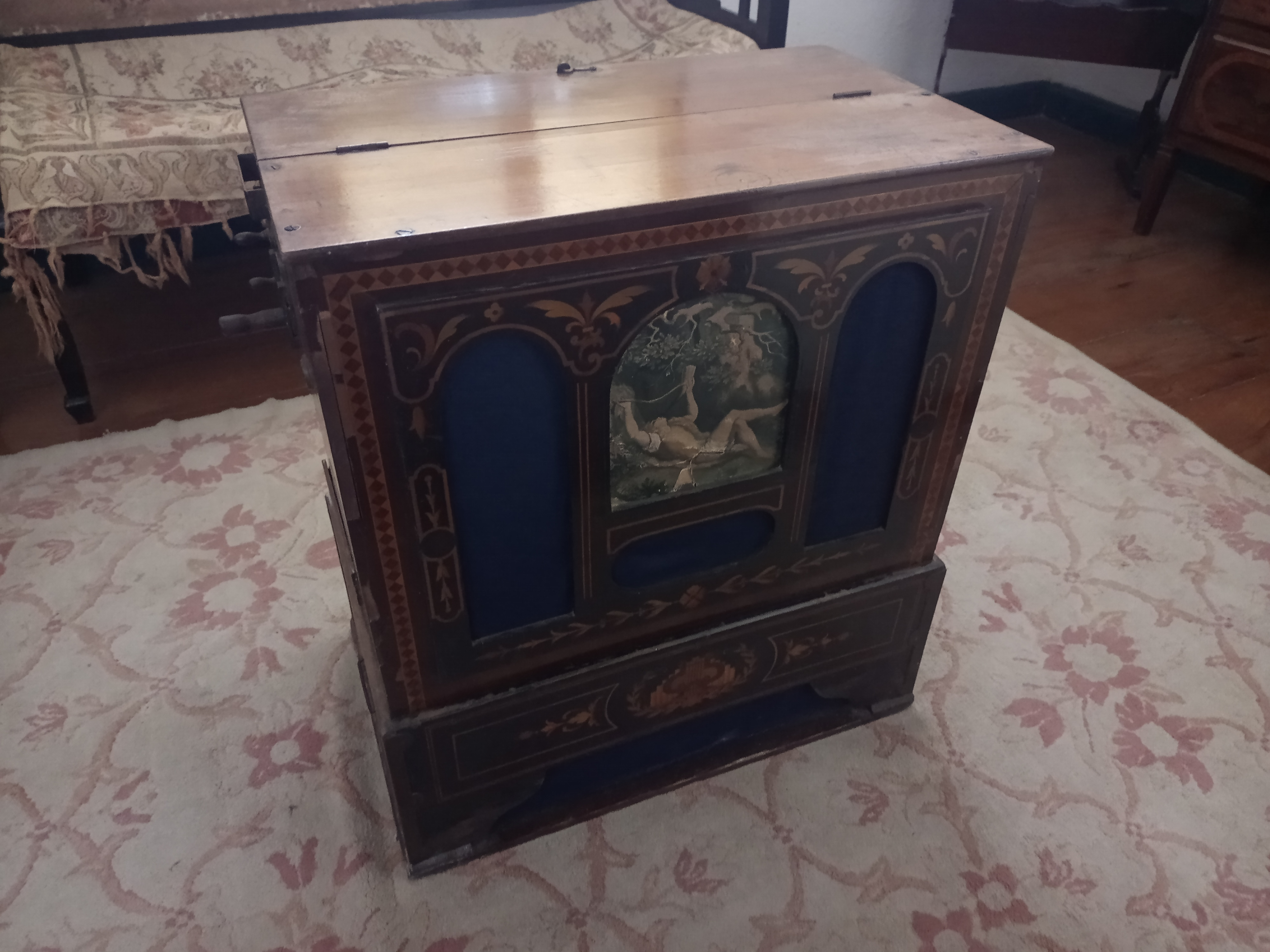

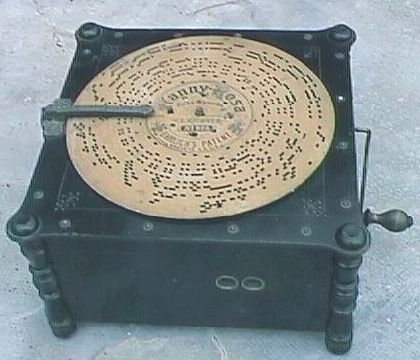
Free-reeded barrel organ made by Paul Ehrlich in Germany, 1892 or 1894

== See also ==
- Barrel Organ Museum Haarlem (Netherlands)
- Calliope (music)
- Player piano
- Dance organ
- Fairground organ
- Musical clock
- Music box
- Organ grinder
- Perroquette
- Pipe organ
- Serinette
- Street organ
