= Book music =

Medium for storing the music played on mechanical organs

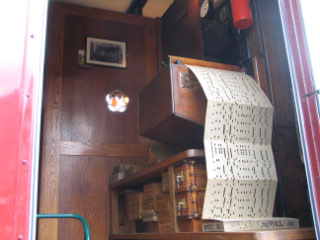
A book playing a large Gavioli fairground organ

Book music (French: Livre de musique) is a medium for storing the music played on mechanical organs, mainly of European manufacture. Book music is made from thick cardboard, containing perforated holes specifying the musical notes to be played, with the book folded zig-zag style. Unlike the heavy pinned barrels, which could only contain a few tunes of fixed length, that had been used on earlier instruments, book music enabled large repertoires to be built up. The length of each tune was no longer determined by the physical dimensions of the instrument.

In 1892, organ maker Anselmo Gavioli patented the "book organ," with a series of folded sheets of cardboard. Holes punched on the pages of the folded book allowed keys to rise in the key frame playing the required note. The keys would cause considerable wear to the music books over time. A solution to this was the keyless frame where the holes allowed air to pass through. The development marked a turning point in the history of the mechanical organ, and it made Gavioli, until his demise in 1910, the most famous and prolific of fair-organ builders.

Book music was the most commonly used medium for large instruments. Used extensively by fairground and street organ makers, book music was also used by Henri Fourneaux in 1863 in his Pianista.

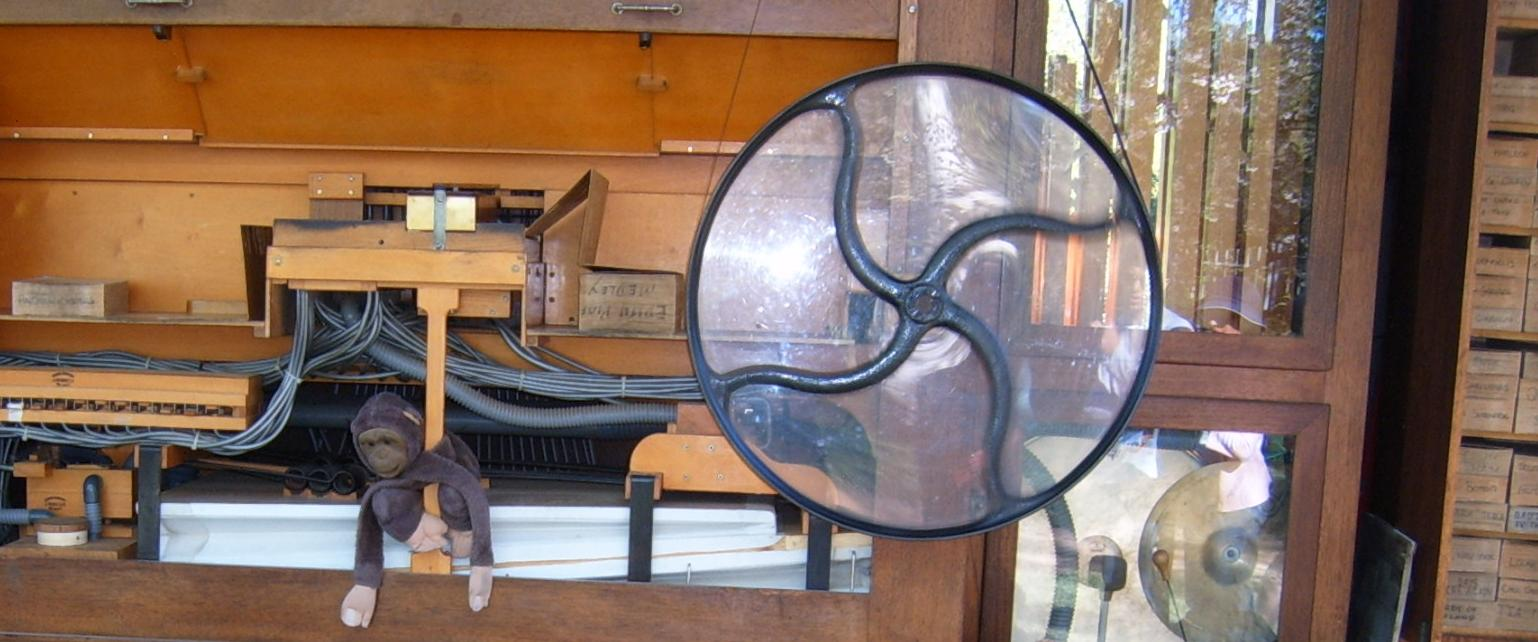
Music mechanism of "Australia Fair" street organ

One of the advantages of book music is that it can be mechanically interpreted. Keys, small levers which rock upwards when a hole passes by, run underneath the book. This motion then mechanically opens the valves of the organ.

Paper rolls on the other hand are "key-less" and are generally only read by pneumatic pressure or suction. Some mechanical organs, particularly those of German manufacture by firms such as Gbr Bruder and Ruth, play keyless cardboard book music, operating pneumatically.

The disadvantage of book music, compared to paper rolls, is the increased size and weight to store an equivalent amount of music. The major advantage of book music, however, is that it is sturdy and not subject to expansion and contraction with humidity. In addition, it is not necessary to rewind a book after playing; therefore, a musical performance may continue almost immediately without a prolonged break (while the instrument is occupied with rewinding the roll). This allows for large books and sets of books to be manufactured, allowing musically versatile capabilities. In Europe the book format, rather than the roll, is the preferred method of operating all but the smallest instruments designed for outdoor use.

== See also ==
- Continuous stationery – Paper designed for use with dot-matrix and line printers
- Player piano – Piano that plays prerecorded works
- Punched card – Paper-based recording medium
- Punched tape – Data storage device
