= Barrel Organ Museum Haarlem =

- Draaiorgelmuseum Haarlem
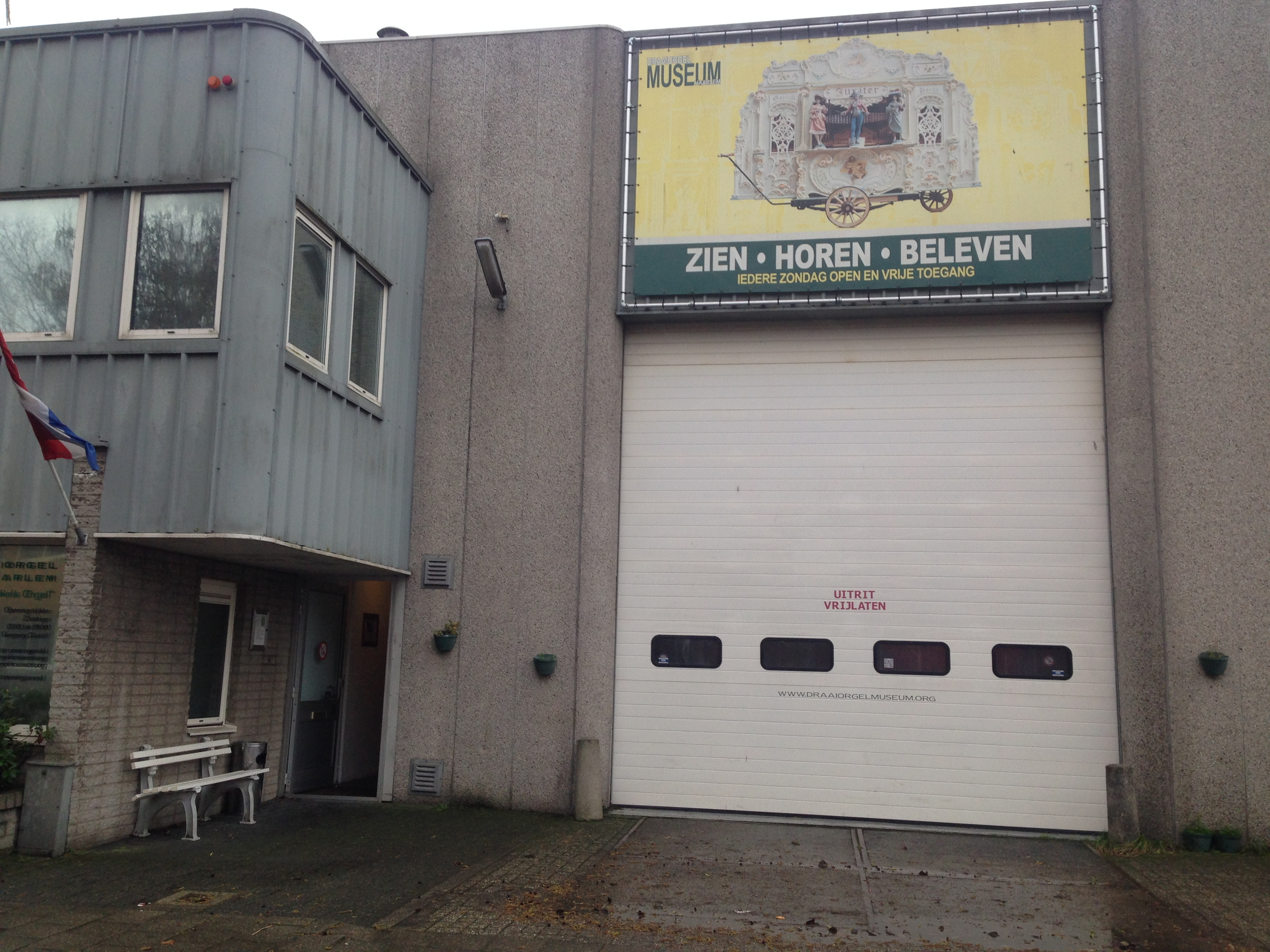
- entrance

- Location within Netherlands
- Established: 1969
- Location: Küppersweg, Haarlem
- Coordinates: 52°23′27.379″N 4°39′11.774″E
- Type: music instrument museum
- Collections: barrel organs
- Owner: Het Kunkels Orgel
- Parking: at the street
- Website: www.draaiorgelmuseum.org

Barrel Organ Museum Haarlem (Dutch: Draaiorgelmuseum Haarlem) is a museum in Haarlem in the Netherlands. Next to the presentation of a variety of barrel organs, accessory objects and documentation material, there is a ballroom where music of the organs is often played. The museum was opened in 1969 by the foundation Het Kunkels Orgel. Since 2014 it has been at its current location within a business park at the Küppersweg.

== History ==
The museum's origin begins in 1958 when a former dancehall organ made by Charles Marenghi & Cie in Paris in 1909 and later restored around 1930 by Carl Frei of Breda was purchased by a group or organ enthusiasts in Haarlem. This organ is known as the Kunkels Organ as it was restored by Frei for Kunkels, a fairground operator from Roermond. The goal in 1958 was the preservation of the organ for the future, for which the foundation Het Kunkels Orgel was brought to existence in 1962. In the course of ten years the organ was restored. At the opening in 1969 it became the central piece of the barrel organ museum. The first establishment was in a former factory building. In the following decades the collection was complemented with own and borrowed barrel organs. Among these, one can find some unique, historic pieces.

Shortly before the beginning of the next century, the survival of the museum was endangered. For the rescue of the museum a successful protest marsh was held through the city of Haarlem by steady visitors with forty barrel organs. Since 9 May 2014 it is located at a business park at the Küppersweg 3.

== Collection and activities ==
The museum shows a collection of seventeen different organs including, dance, cafe, street and fair organs. Het Kunkels Orgel is a concert organ and the biggest of its type in Europe. There are also theater organs, like Lady Compton, that were used for the musical accompaniment of silent films. The eldest organ in the museum dates from 1900.

In the museum concerts with organs are held weekly on Sundays. One of the used instruments is De Lange Gavioli that can be heard since a long restoration was fulfilled in 2016. An organ that was borrowed for some years, was the Pod (nl), a sister organ of the Schuyt; the latter one was built by Carl Frei, shortly later than Het Kunkels Orgel. Next to that, the museum frequently organizes barrel organ events.

== Impression ==
video with interview (in Dutch)

video with music

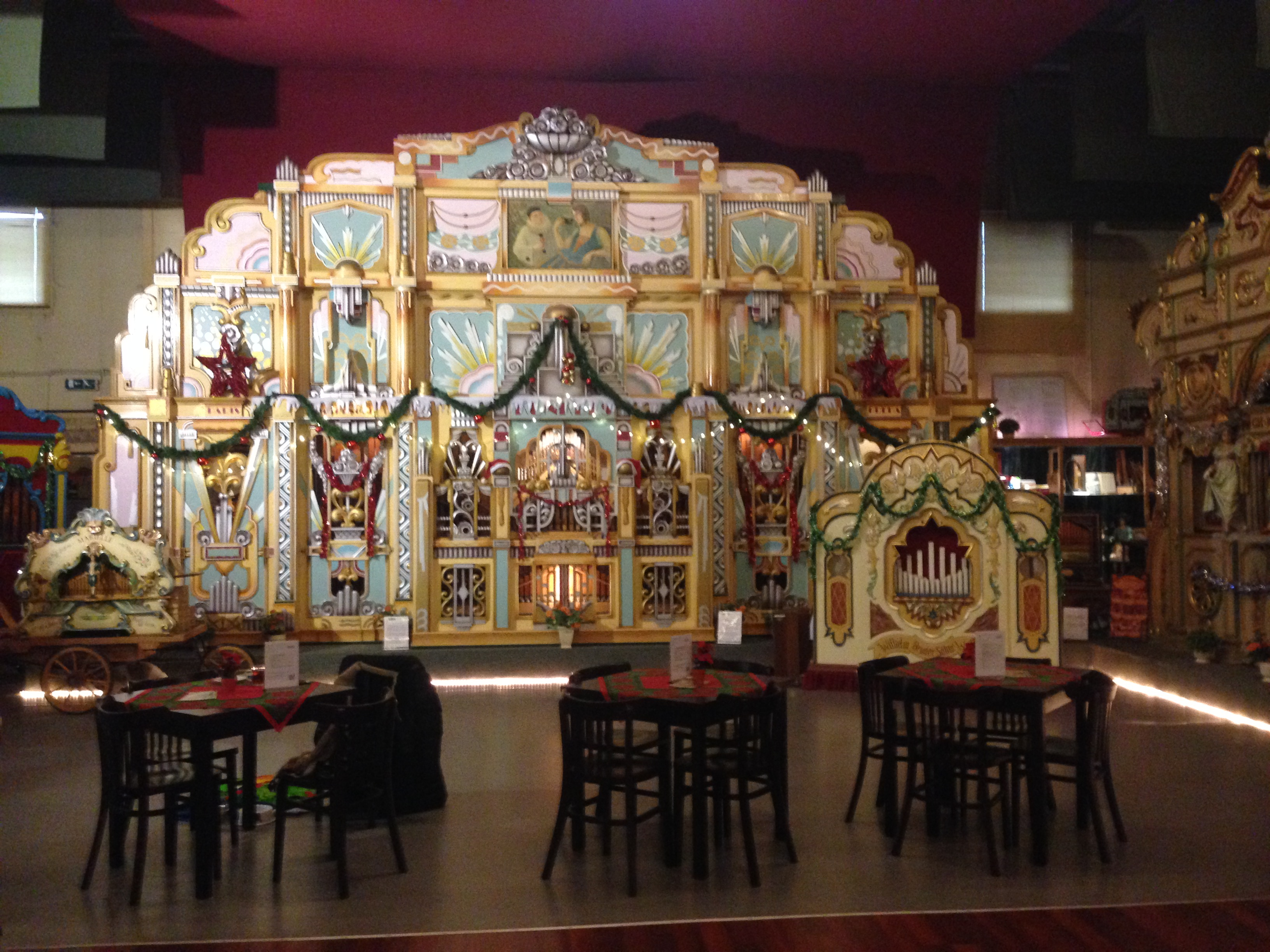
view in the museum

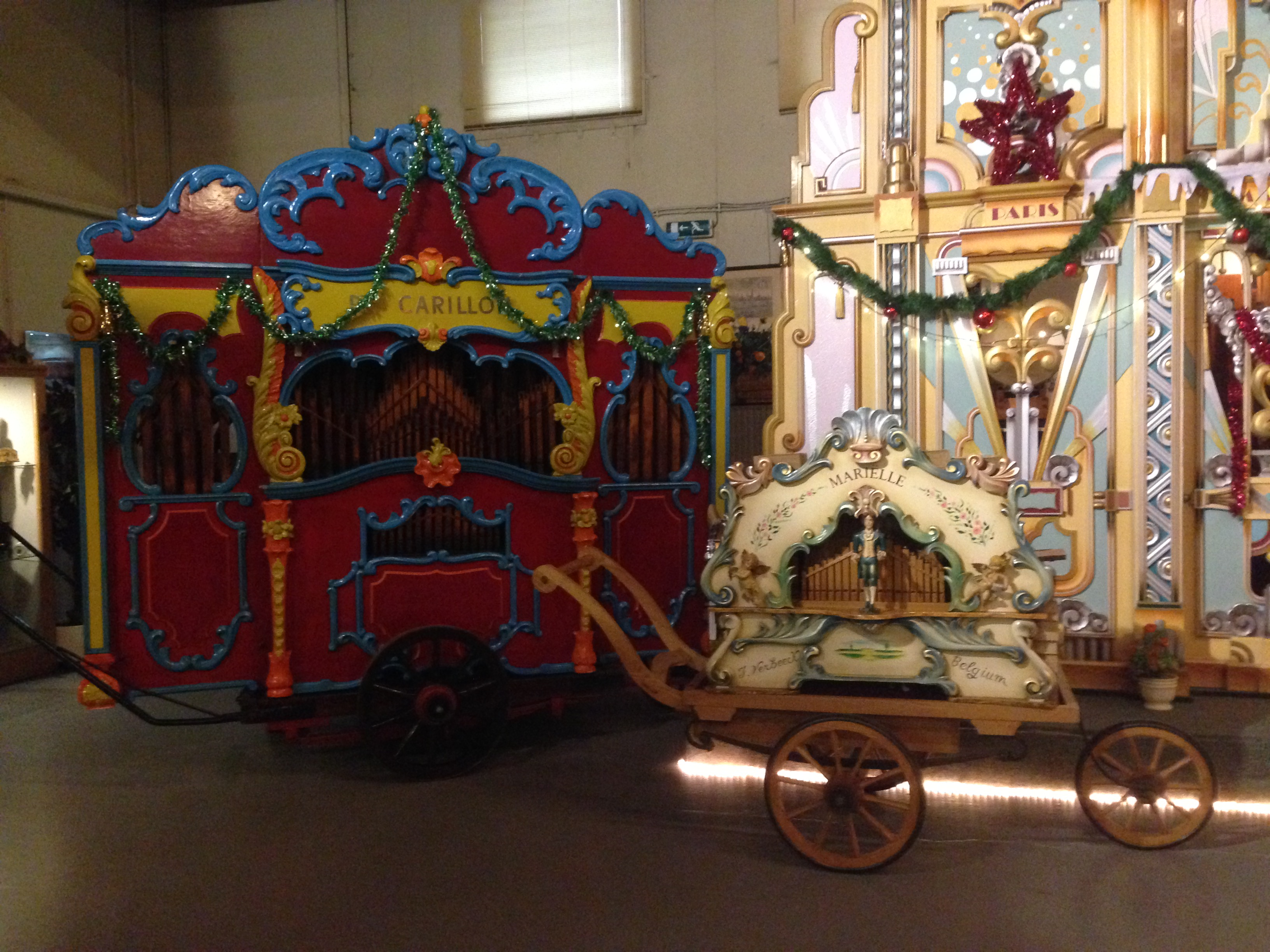
view in the museum

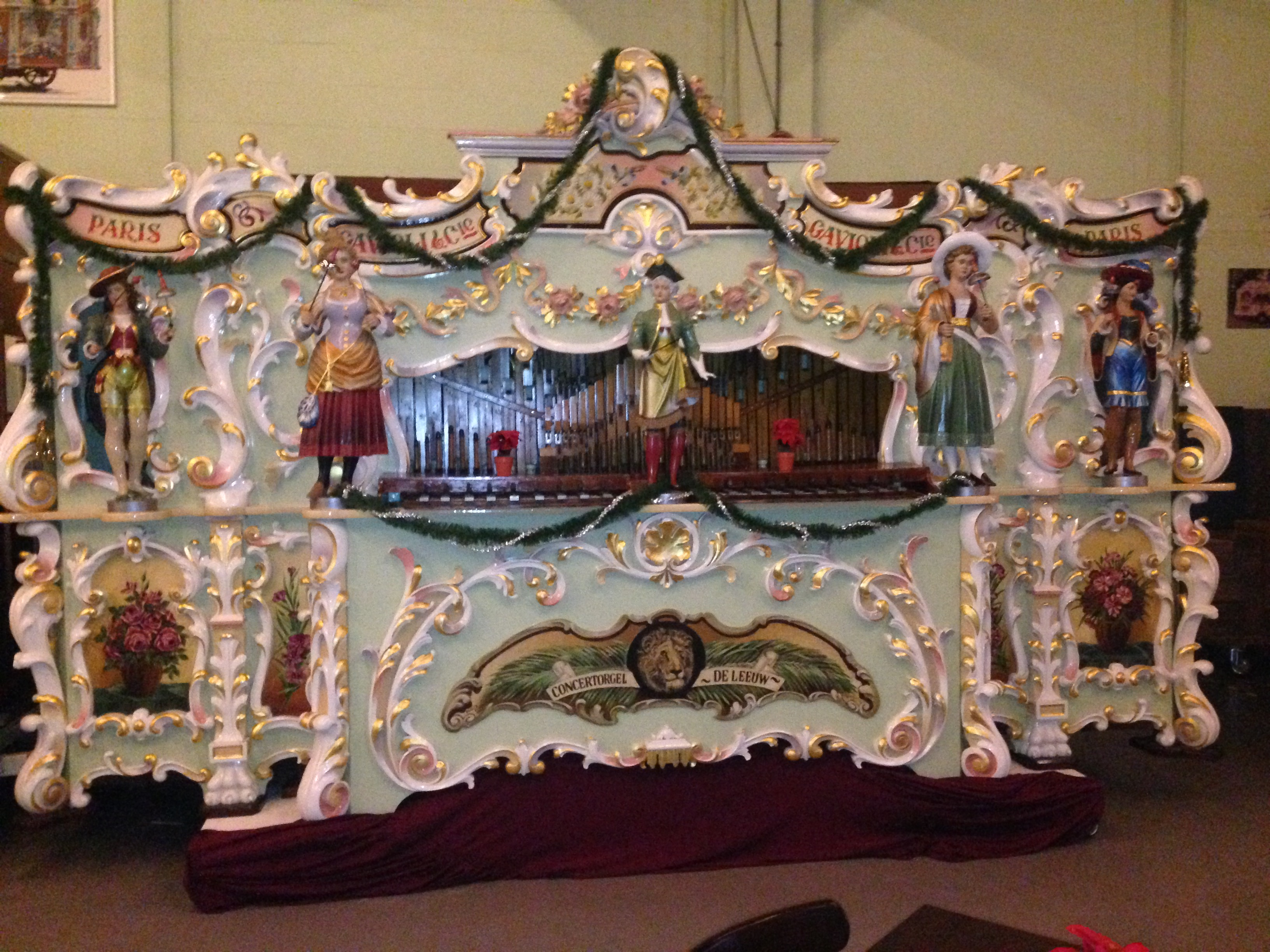
view in the museum

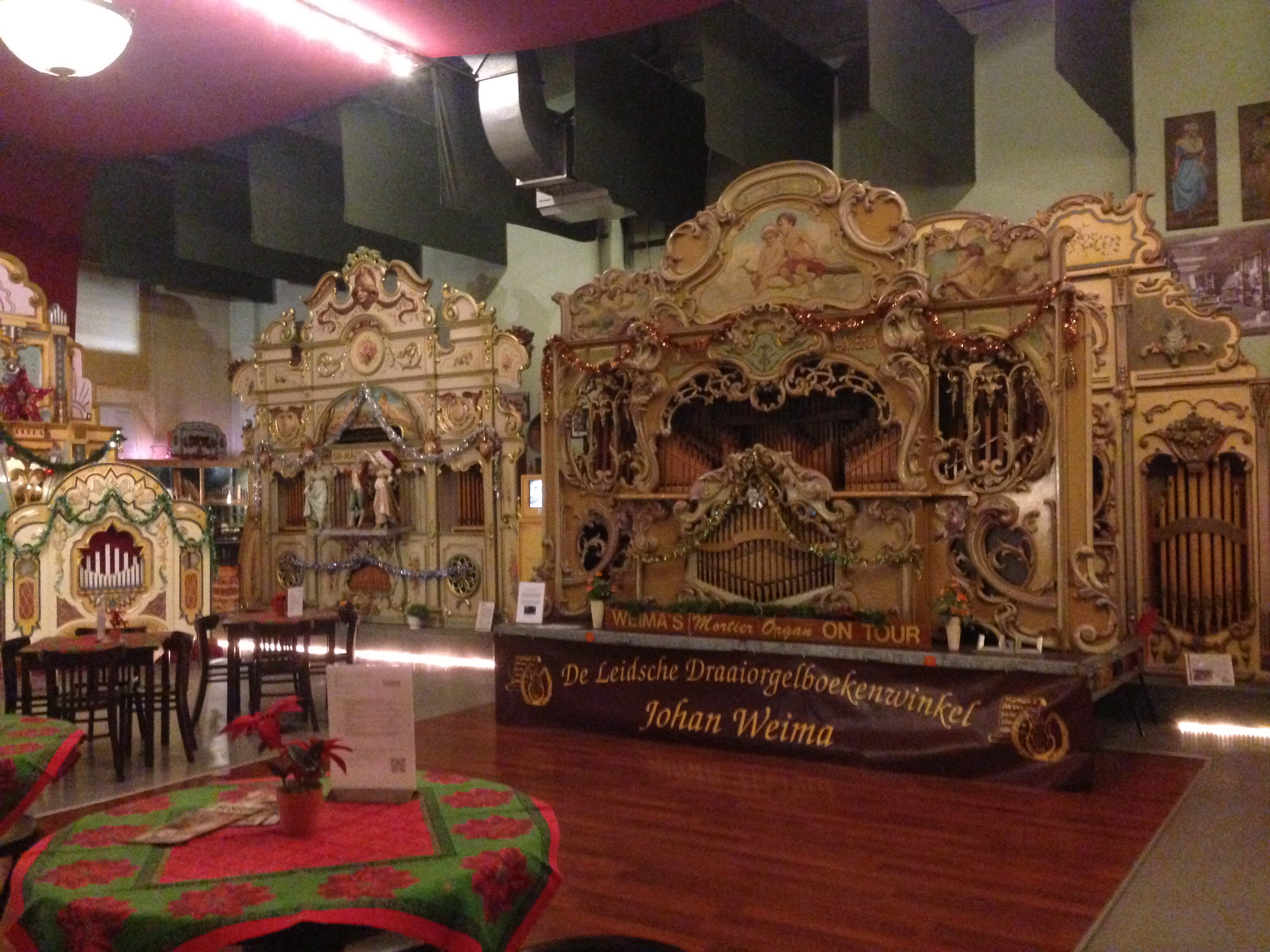
view in the museum

== See also ==
- List of museums in the Netherlands
- List of music museums
