= Music roll =

Storage medium used to operate a mechanical instrument such as a player piano

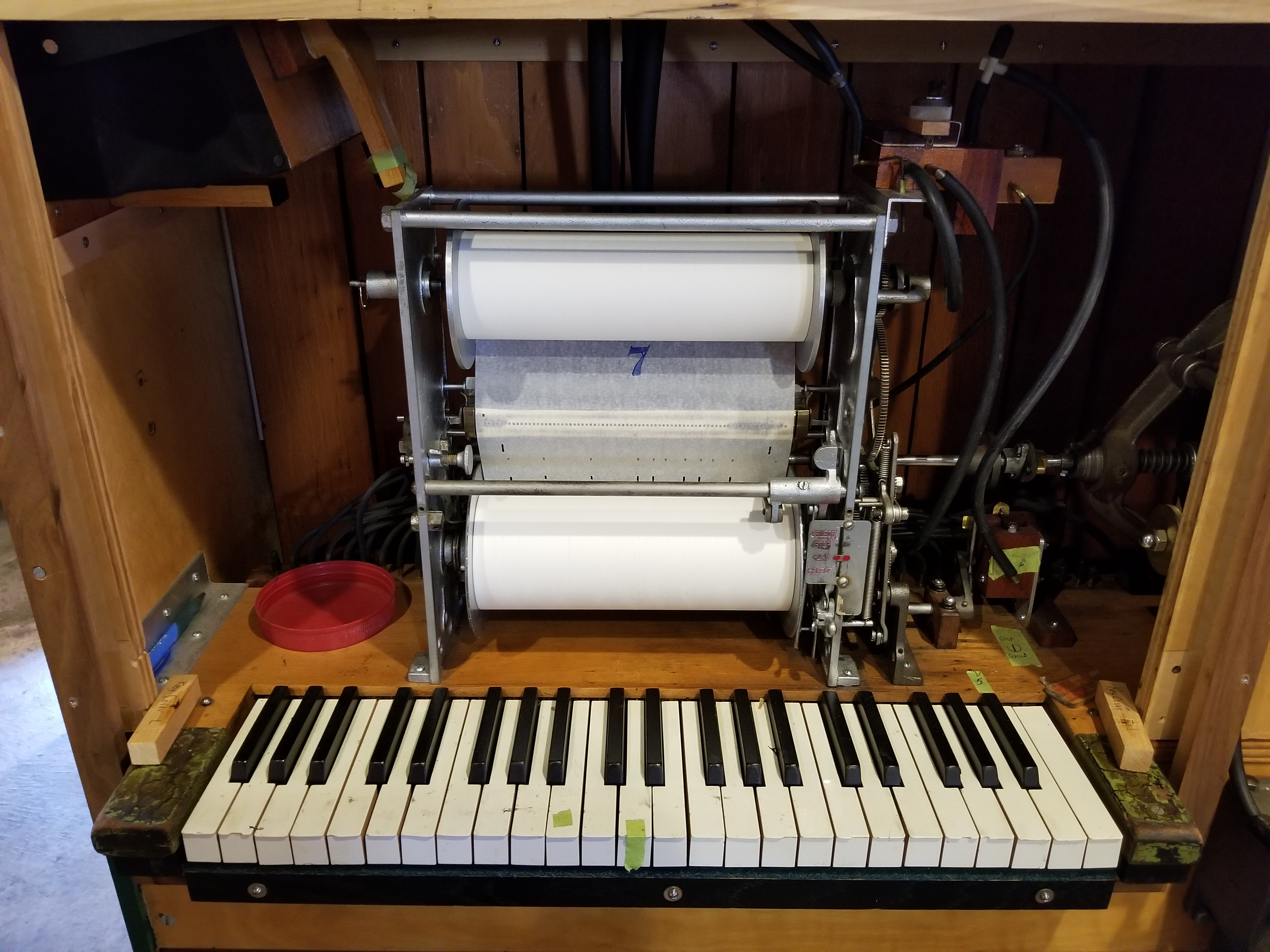
A Wurlitzer Caliola roll ready to be played

A music roll (French: Rouleau à musique) is a storage medium used to operate a mechanical musical instrument. They are used for the player piano, mechanical organ, electronic carillon and various types of orchestrion. The vast majority of music rolls are made of paper. Other materials that have been utilized include thin card (Imhof-system), thin sheet brass (Telektra-system), composite multi-layered electro-conductive aluminium and paper roll (Triste-system) and, in the modern era, thin plastic or PET film.

The music data is stored by means of perforations. The mechanism of the instrument reads these as the roll unwinds, using a pneumatic, mechanical or electrical sensing device called a tracker bar, and the mechanism subsequently plays the instrument.

After a roll is played, it is necessary for it to be rewound before it can be played again. This necessitates a break in a musical performance. To overcome this problem, some instruments were built with two player mechanisms (referred to as a duplex roll mechanism) allowing one roll to play while the other rewinds.

A piano roll is a specific type of music roll, and is designed to operate an automatic piano like the player piano or the reproducing piano.

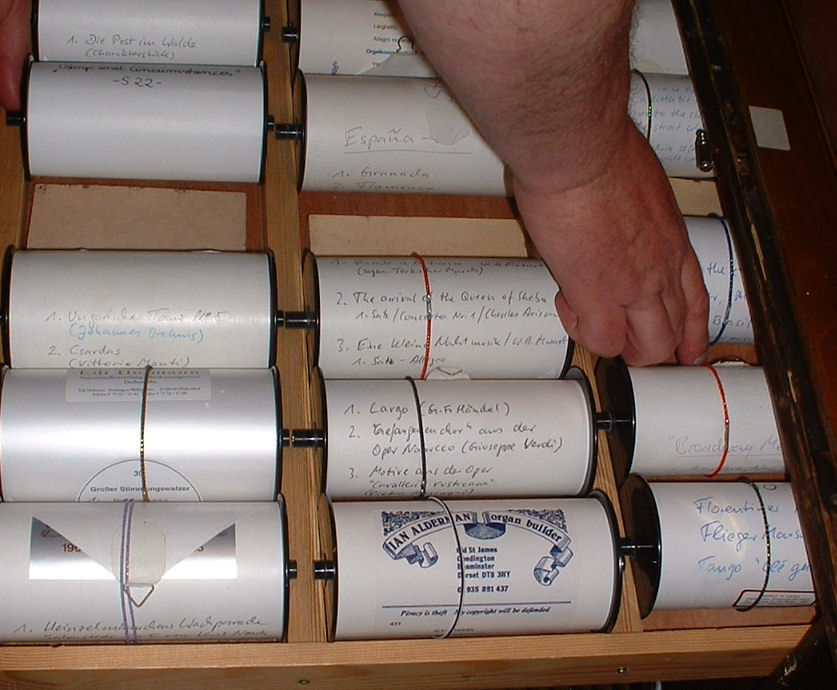
Selecting a paper roll of music.

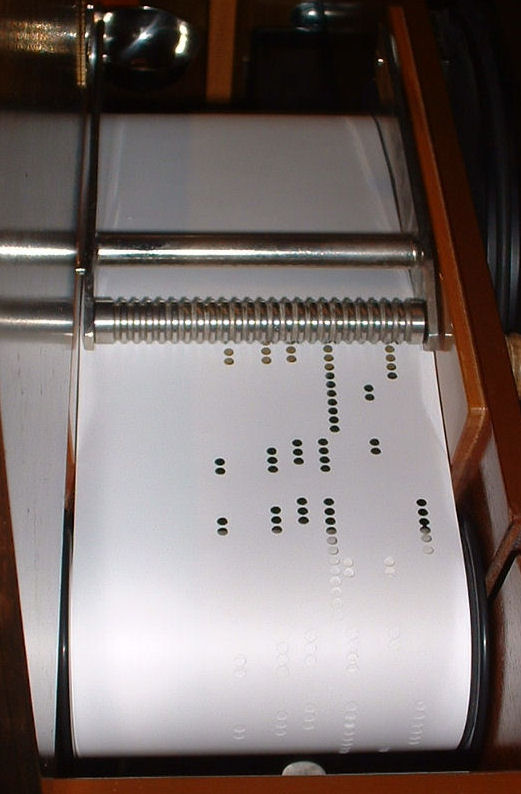
Music roll in place showing a pattern of holes representing notes.

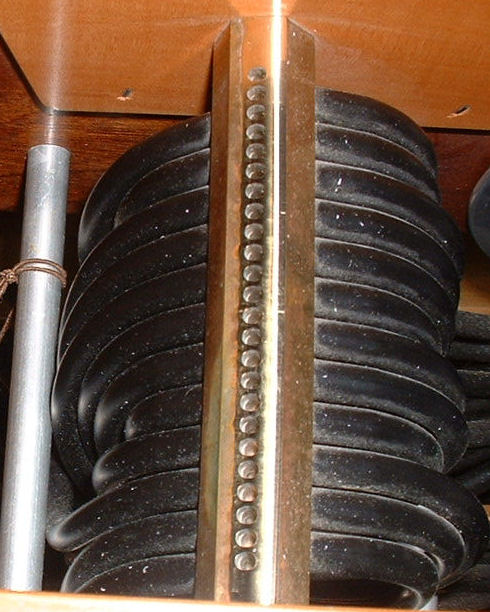
Tracker bar, which reads the punched music roll.

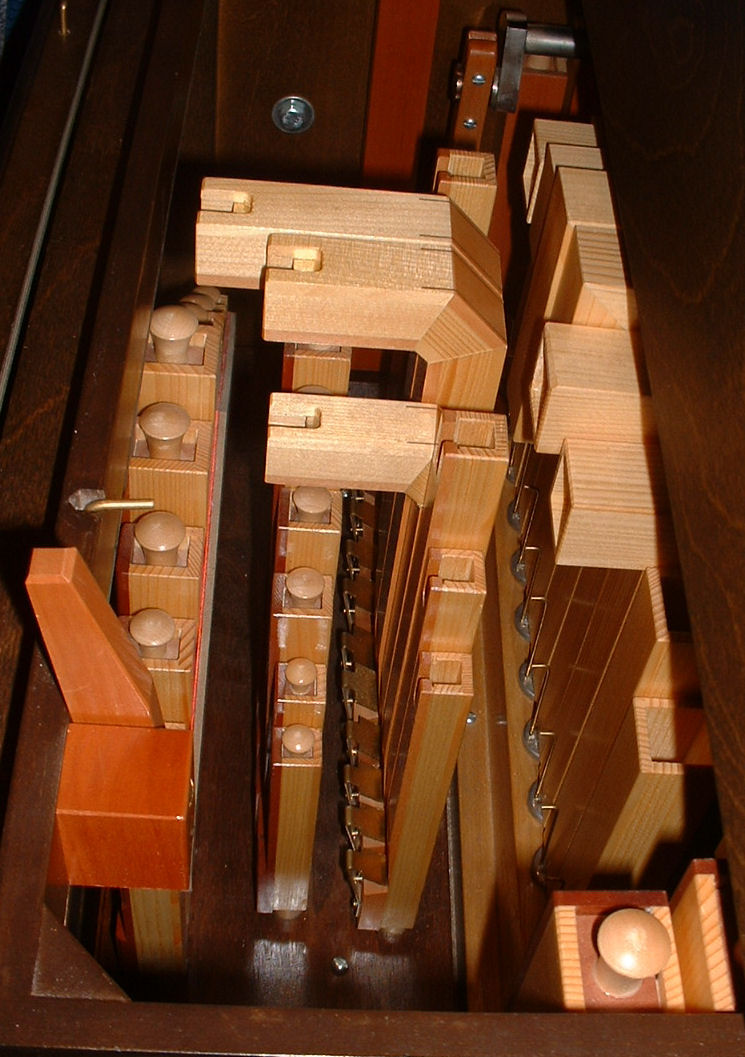
Each hole is connected to a valve in the interior of the organ which operates the organ pipes such as these wooden ones.

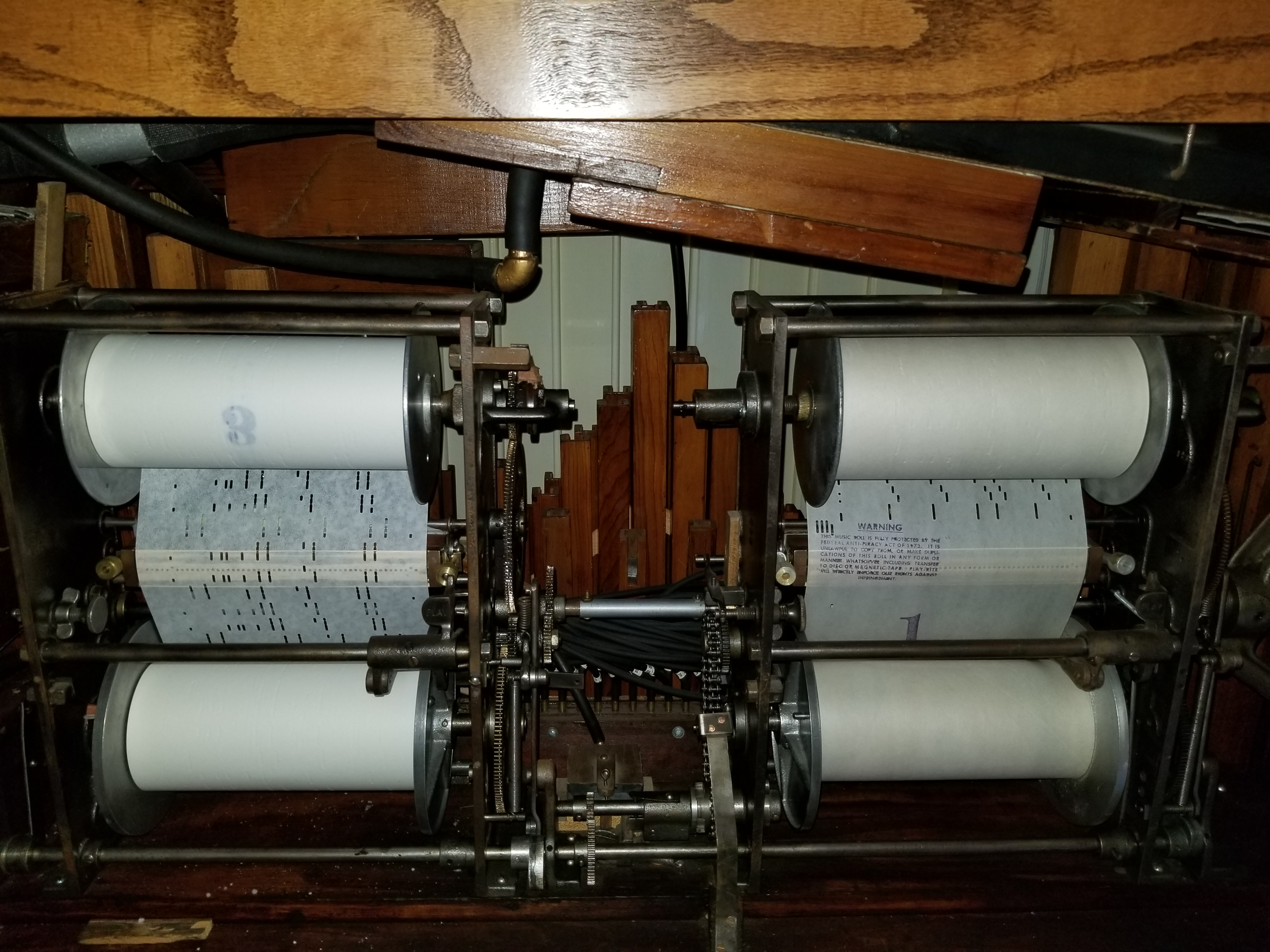
Duplex roll mechanism of a Wurlitzer 153 band organ

== See also ==
- Book music
- Piano roll
- Punched tape
- Jacquard loom
