= Barrel piano =

Mechanical musical instrument

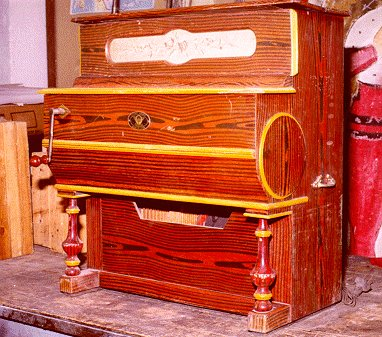
A Faventia barrel piano

A barrel piano (also known as a "roller piano") is a forerunner of the modern player piano. Unlike the pneumatic player piano, a barrel piano is usually powered by turning a hand crank, though coin-operated models powered by clockwork were used to provide music in establishments such as pubs and cafés. Barrel pianos were popular with street musicians, who sought novel instruments that were also highly portable. They are frequently confused with barrel organs, but are quite different instruments.

== Operation ==
The central element of the barrel piano is a wooden barrel covered in strategically placed pins that play the piano when the barrel is turned. The operator uses a hand crank for this purpose, and can control the speed of the music by turning the crank slower or faster. Barrels typically contain a small number of short tunes; therefore, the musical repertoire is limited by the number of barrels one can afford and easily transport.

Barrel pianos typically have a range of 40–48 (Non-Chromatic scale) notes, in contrast to standard pianos that normally have 85 or 88 chromatic keys. More elaborate barrel pianos may also include one or more percussion instruments such as bells, wood blocks, a triangle or two, small cymbals, tambourines and drums, much like their larger cousin the Piano Orchestrion.

== History ==
Barrel pianos were first developed in the early 19th century as an attempt to mechanically automate piano music. They never found their way into homes in any significant quantity, instead being favored by street musicians and other entertainers and as background music in commercial premises. It is believed that in circa 1805 the famous cabinet making family of Hicks in Bristol, England turned their attention to the building of musical instruments and are credited with inventing and building the very first street barrel piano in Bristol around this date. So by 1816 the firm of Joseph Hicks was well established as a leading supplier of barrel street pianos and organs. The Hicks pattern of street piano was so popular that other firms copied the design. One of the Hicks family, John had a workshop in London and this may be why sometimes it is believed that the production of barrel pianos originated in London, One of the first prominent German manufacturers was Welte, originally from Vöhrenbach in the Black Forest.

The Tomasso family also were active in Southgate, London N14 and in Leeds in the late 19th and early 20th centuries making barrel pianos and barrel organs for hire by street musicians. A barrel piano by A Tomasso may be seen and heard at the Musical Museum, Brentford, England.

== Laterna ==
A variant of the barrel piano became very popular in Greece in the late 19th and early 20th century. It was named laterna or rhombia. It was in the shape of an oversized trunk that could be carried on the player's back with straps and would be propped up on foldable wooden legs. The first laternas were crafted in Constantinople by the Italian Giuseppe Turconi and the Greek Joseph Armaos. Piano parts were mainly used in its assembly and the mechanism included a barrel with nails, which plucked steel pegs which released spring-loaded levers that struck the piano strings and an included bell. The instrument's range was three and a half octaves. The barrel was turned by a hand crank and was usually big enough to contain nine songs.

== Variations ==
Some manufacturers, such as Favienta of Barcelona, Spain, produced barrel pianos with advanced accessories, such as:

- A model that could play the standard six-tune barrels as well as a barrel of three tunes. The three-tune barrel had a threaded addition on it and the cylinder moved slowly on its horizontal axis as the user cranked. At the end of the third tune, the keyframe moved out of the way of the barrel pins, the barrel shifted to the start position, and the first song started over.
- A model that added an electric motor for continuous unassisted playing
- The mandolin piano, which used mechanically driven repeated action
