= Draaiorgel de Vijf Beelden =

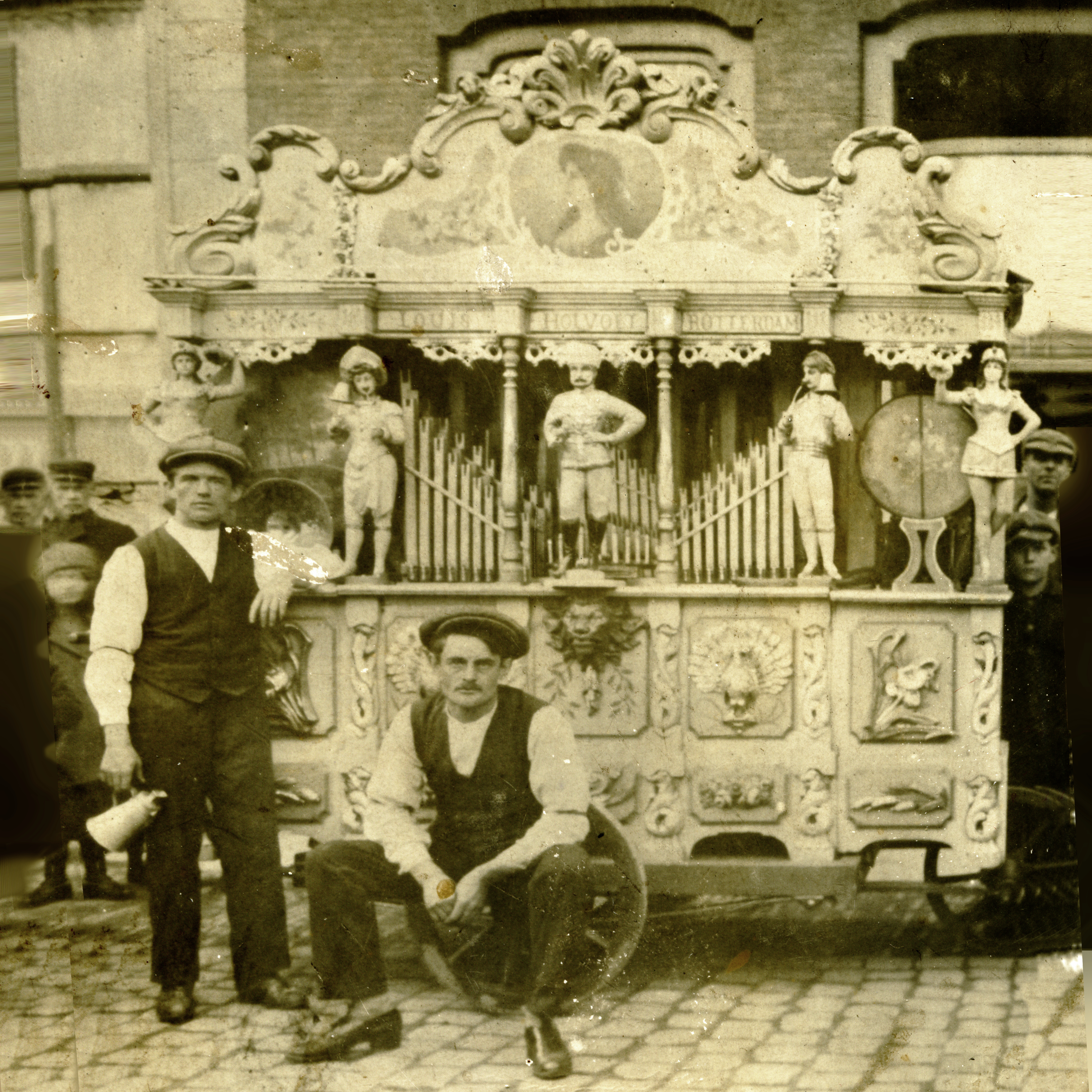
Draaiorgel de Vijf Beelden (Dutch street organ of the Five Figures) with the Gebroeders (c.1910)

Draaiorgel de Vijf Beelden (en: Dutch street organ of the Five Figures), or De Vijf Beeldenkast (en: The Five Figures Cabinet) was a Dutch street organ with 52 keys.

== Course of life ==
Originally, the organ was built as Gasparini organ and possibly rebuilt at Limonaire. It came in 1910 with the Gebroeders [The Brothers] in the Haarlemmer Houttuinen. The organ had five figures: one conductor, two calling (nl: slaande) ladies and two rigid (not moving) ladies in dance posture.

The first years of its existence, the organ has had some tenants, such as De Kraai, De Manke, and Willem Renz. Then the organ is sold to Holvoet which sends it in 1926 to Carl Frei in Breda, to let it grow. With this renovation, the organ gets another front, the five figures disappear, but retains its Gavioli mechanics.

A few years later Henk Möhlmann from Amsterdam bought organ. He places two Gasparin side pictures and a Limonaire middle picture the organ. For the side panels, it uses two female figures of the Organ Valhalla. Now the organ was again literally become De Vijf Beelden [The Five Pictures], as the name was in the beginning. After that the organ has walked for many years in Amsterdam and Rotterdam.

In the 70s, the organ was bought by Autotron in Drunen, Rosmalen [an automobile museum in the Netherlands]. This beautiful organ was already little more about. Most of the pipes (including the drone of Carl Frei) were removed and most of the books remained with the old owner behind. After Autotron was closed, the organ was sold. In 2021, the organ was completely renovated by Cas Hendrickx.

== Gallery ==
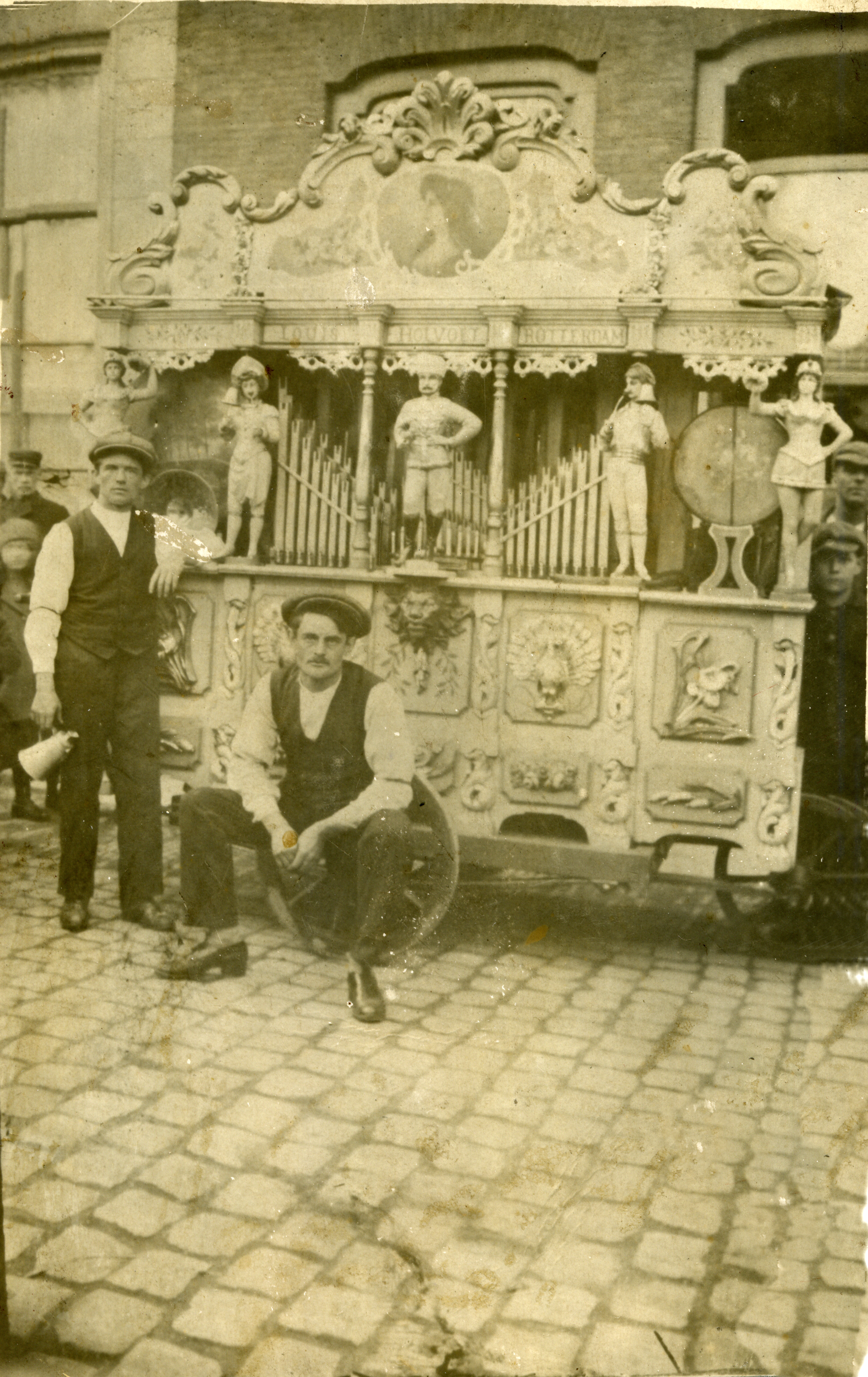
The organ around 1910, then owned by the Gebroeders.

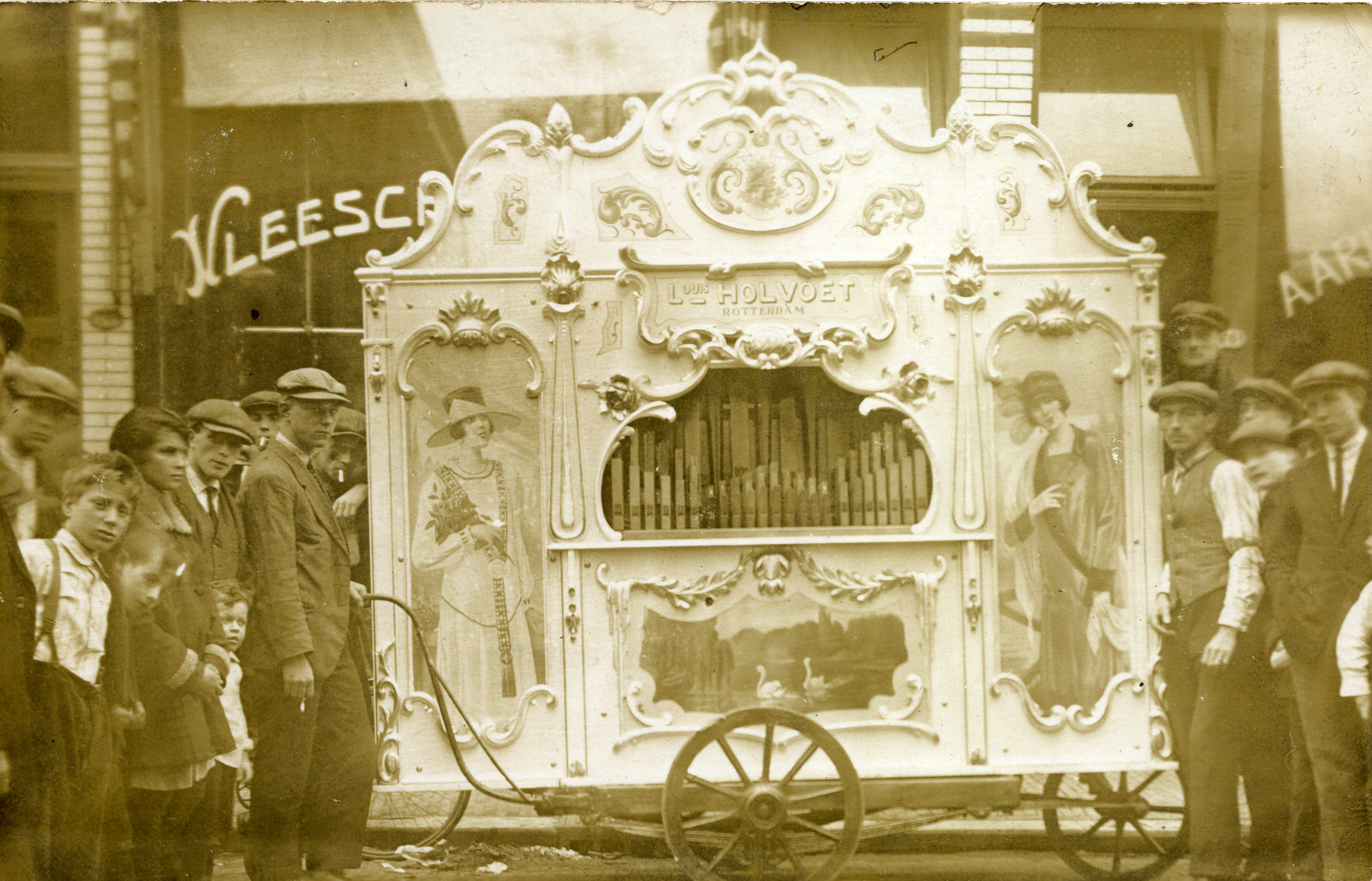
The organ in 1930, after the renovation by Carl Frei.

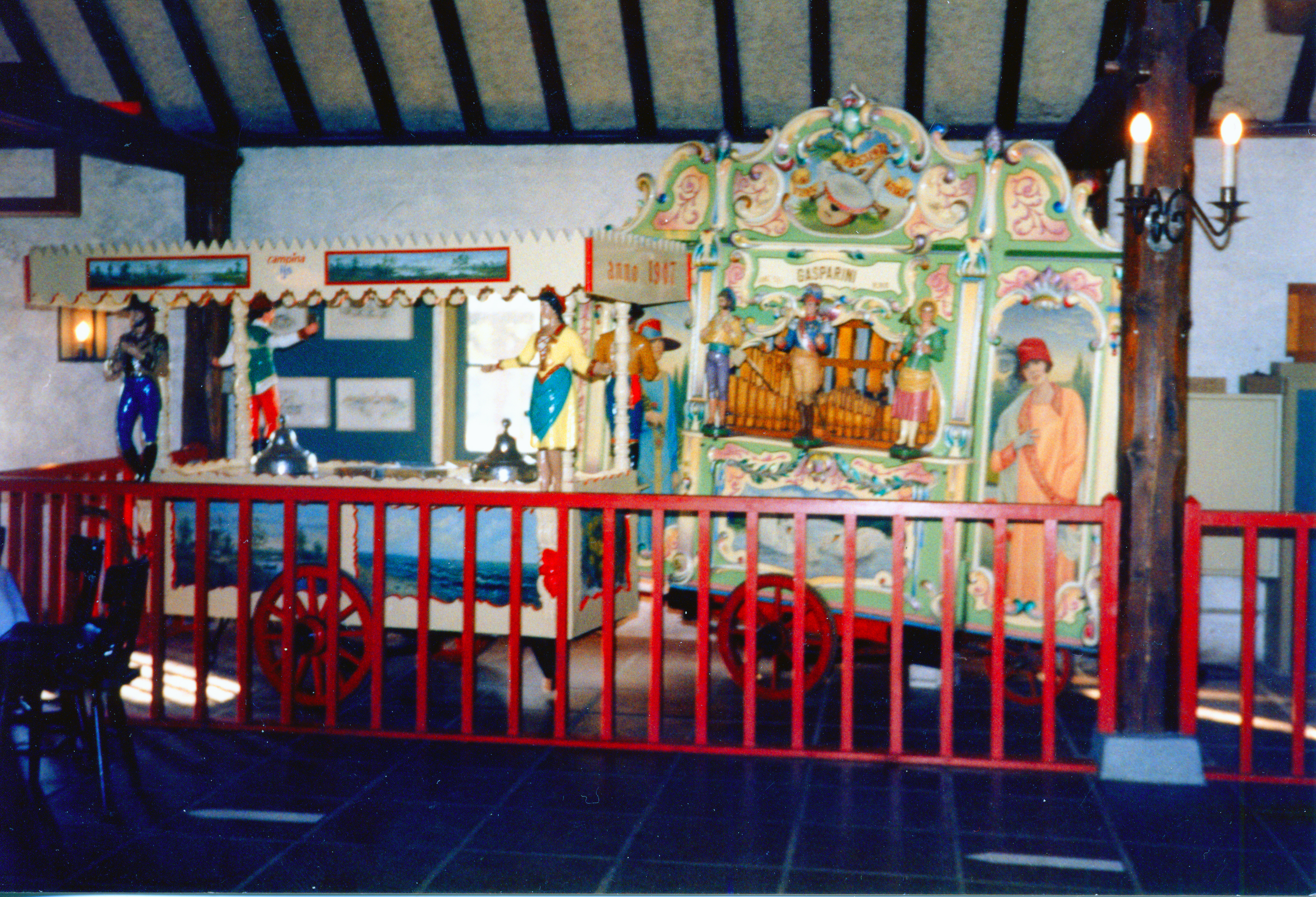
The organ in 1986 at Autotron (automobile museum) in Rosmalen, Drunen.
