= Steam carousel =

The Steam carousel is:

- a type of carousel

Specific examples of the steam carousel are:

- Steam Carousel (Efteling), Netherlands
