= Cesare Watry =

19th-20th century Italian magician

Cesare Watry (1864–1943) was the stage name of Giovanni Girardi, an Italian practitioner of stage magic and a pioneer of cinema through his own original form of bioscope show. He was recognized, particularly in Latin America, as a “master illusionist” and an “extraordinary popular” entertainer both through stage magic and his bioscope shows.

Girardi was born in Ravenna and formed in the 1880s the “Eccentric Company,” a traveling troupe offering a show based on illusionism throughout Italy, particularly in Tuscany. At the end of the century, the troupe was renamed “The Eccentric Company of Sino-Japanese Marvels,” and offered something called “Fotoveramovil,” a rather simple form of bioscope show, featuring among others images of the Diamond Jubilee of Queen Victoria and the wedding of the future king Victor Emmanuel III of Italy, together with views of Jerusalem and France, later adding to the repertoire the stories of Cinderella, Bluebeard and others, as well as Spiritualist séances.

The Fotoveramovil was later renamed “Watrygraf” and Watry's were among the first mixed cinema and magic shows not only in Italy and Brazil, but also in Peru (1899), where he presented images of corrida and created a commotion because of his provocatively dressed female assistants, and in Seville (1904).

The magic shows by Watry continued until World War II. Another well-known Italian stage magician, Wetryk, started his career working for the Eccentric Company but formed his own company, where he adopted his stage name to honor Watry, in 1914.
