= Fairground organ =

Pneumatic musical organ originating from France

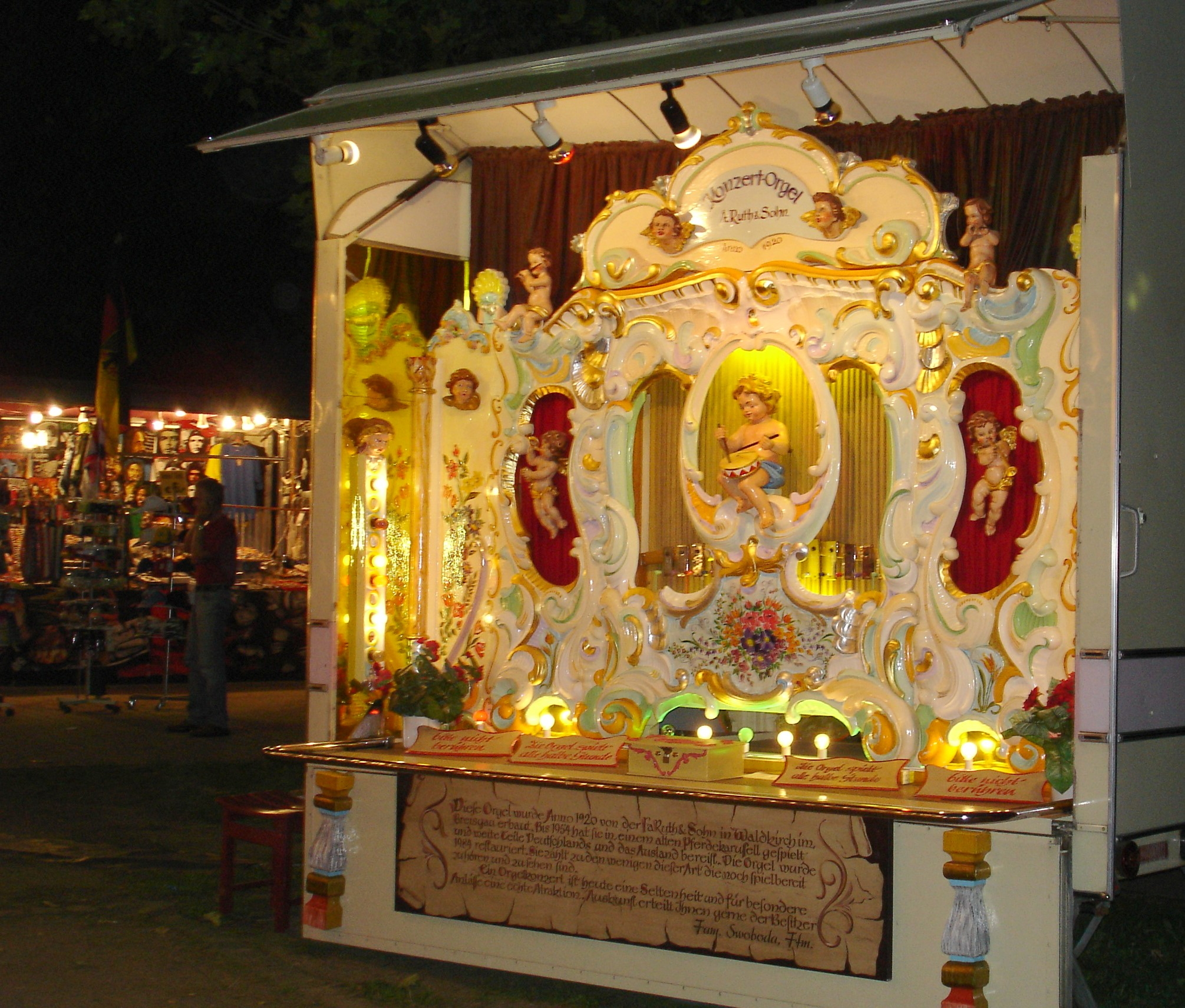
Ruth Fairground organ

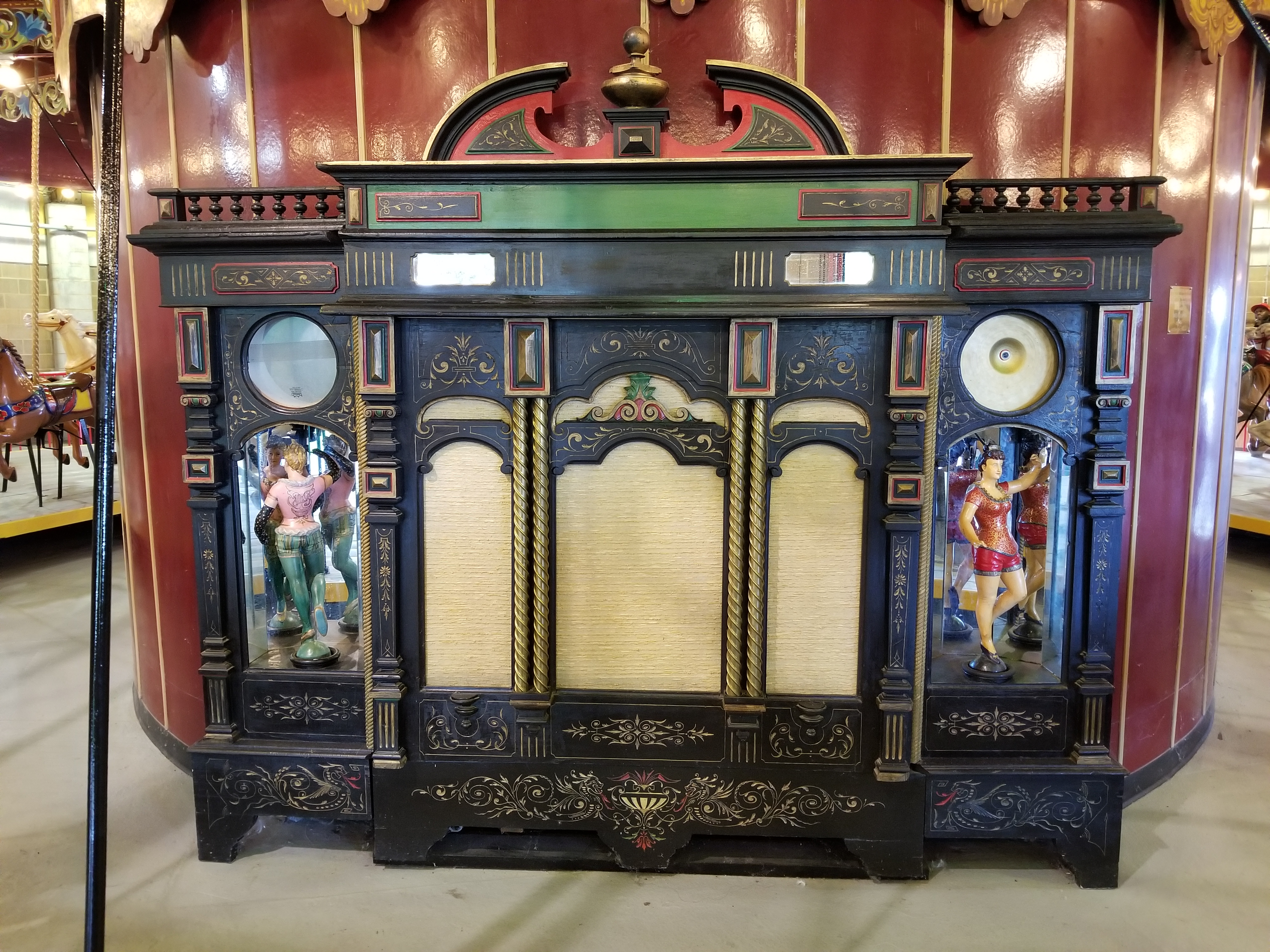
The Frati & Co. Band Organ at the Lakeside Park Carousel in Port Dalhousie, Ontario

A fairground organ is a mechanical organ covering the wind and percussive sections of an orchestra. Originating in Paris, France, these organs were designed for use in commercial fairground settings to provide loud music to accompany rides and attractions, mostly merry-go-rounds. Unlike organs for indoor use, fairground organs are designed to be loud enough to be heard above the noises of crowds and fairground machinery.

== History ==
As fairgrounds became more mechanised at the end of the nineteenth century, their musical needs grew. The period of greatest activity of fairground organ manufacture and development was the late 1830s, particularly with the opening of the Limonaire Frères company of Avenue Daumesnil, Paris in 1839. Virtually all ambient fairground music continued to be produced by fairground organs and similar pneumatically operated instruments until the advent of effective electrical sound amplification in the mid-1920s. The organ chassis was typically covered with an ornate and florid decorative case façade designed to attract attention in the tradition of most fairground equipment. Giacomo Gavioli patented the use of book music to play organs, which later became the basis of fairground organs. In 1910, Joseph and Antoine Limonaire took over the patents when Gavioli ceased production, leading to limonaire becoming the generic French name for fairground organs.

The ornate case façades frequently had percussion instruments such as a glockenspiel and drums that provided visual entertainment as they played. There were often ornate human figures, such as a conductor whose arm moved in time to the music, or women whose arms struck bells.

The organs were designed to mimic the musical capabilities of a typical human band. For this reason they are known as band organs in the United States.

The motive force for a fairground organ is typically wind under pressure generated from mechanically powered bellows in the instrument's base. Without the need for a human player, the instruments are keyboard-less (except for relatively rare configurations with one or more accordions, whose keys could be seen to move). Early organs were played by a rotating barrel with the sounds triggered by metal pins, as in a music box. Later organs employed strips of cards perforated with the music data and registration (instrument) controls called book music; or interchangeable rolls of perforated paper called music rolls, similar to those used in player pianos.

Since the advent of computer control (from the early 1970s on), some band organs have been built or converted to be played electronically. Victory, pictured above, is a hybrid of these technologies. Its traditional pneumatic instruments can be played either from traditional perforated books, or from its integrated Yamaha MIDI interface. Owner Willem Kelders can also use the interface to link organs (Rhapsody and Locomotion, driven by Victory) to play the same music together.

Fairground organs have been used in many entertainment settings, including fairground rides, static sideshows (such as bioscope shows), amusement parks, and skating rinks. Many can be seen exhibited at steam fairs.

Manufacturers of fairground organs also typically made instruments for indoor use in dance halls, called dance organs; and smaller versions for travelling street use, called street organs.

Like all mechanical instruments, fairground organs have been made by a myriad of manufacturers, in various sizes and to various technical specifications, with various trademark characteristics. Active preservation initiatives and collectors' communities are associated with vintage instruments, and new instruments and music continue to be produced.

== Operation ==
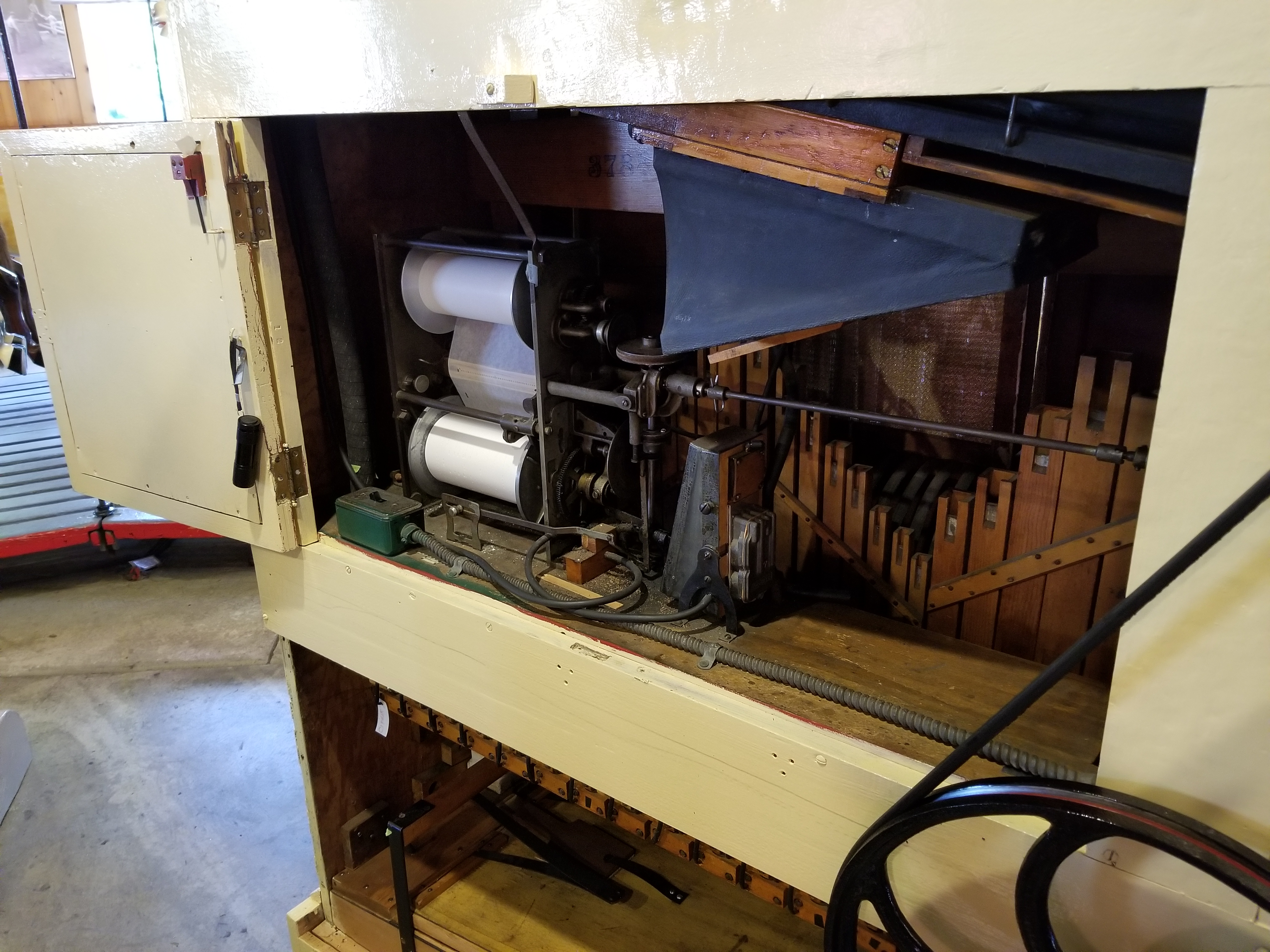
The roll-playing mechanism on the Wurlitzer 146 band organ at the Herschell Carrousel Factory Museum in North Tonawanda, NY. 150 Scale.

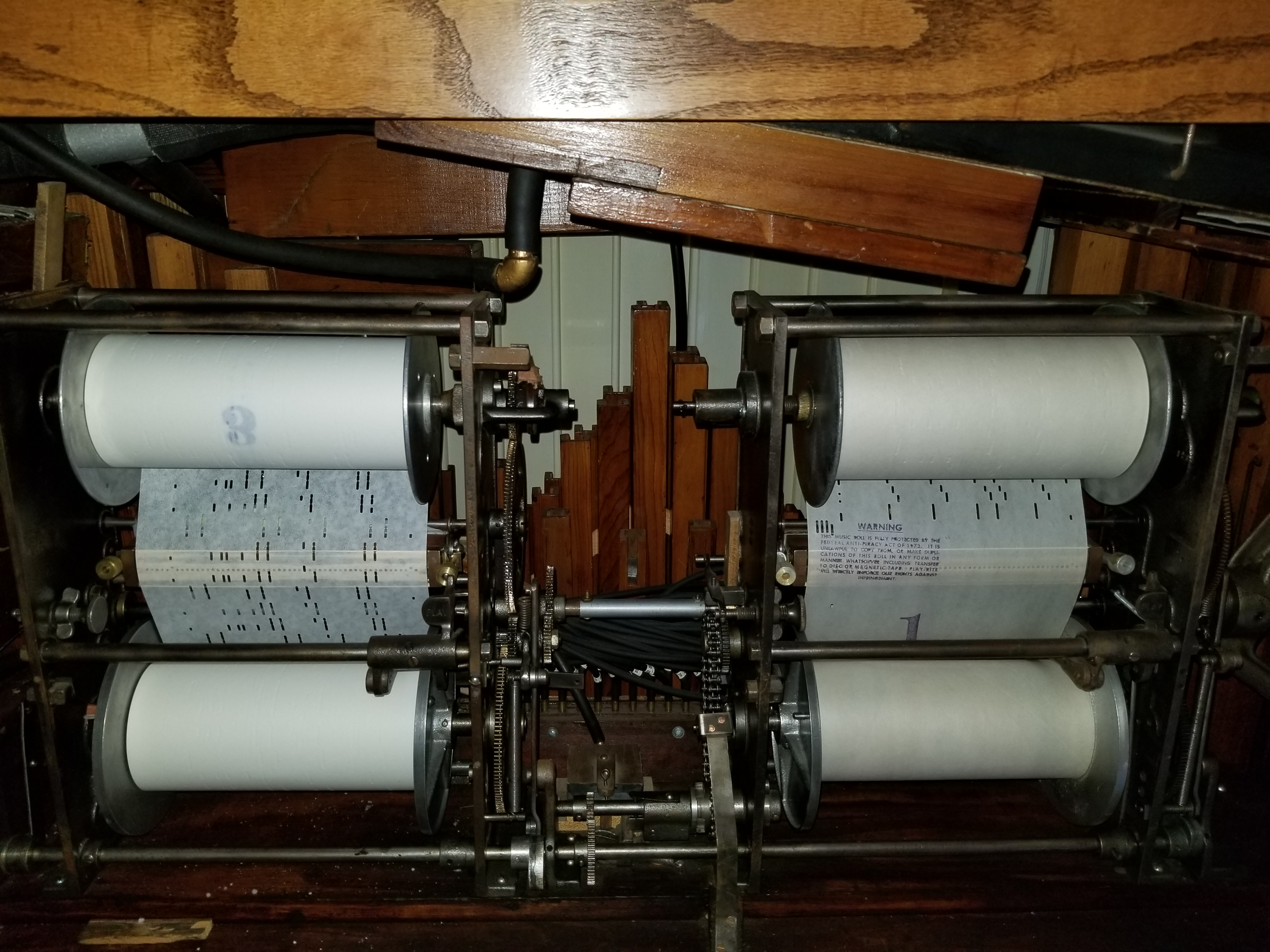
Duplex roll mechanism of a Wurlitzer 153 band organ

Early organs were designed to be compact and operated by an unskilled person or mechanically. These were played via an integral pinned barrel requiring no human input apart from changing the number of the tune being played. These had a fixed repertoire and, if it was desired to change the tunes, a complete new pinned barrel was required. To offer a more flexible choice of repertoire, a system of robust interchangeable perforated cardboard book music was patented first by Parisian manufacturers Gavioli. Their system became widely regarded as commercially advantageous and other manufacturers followed suit. Book music offered a cheaper and more readily updated alternative to barrel music. Also used by many manufacturers including Gavioli was operation via paper music roll. These rolls were more compact and cheaper to manufacture than book music. Technically, they were more susceptible to poor handling but all systems experienced their own types of characteristic wear and tear during repeated playing. Both "book" and "roll" systems were manufactured with different operating actions. "Keyed" instruments read the music mechanically with a lever dropping into the slot in the music. "Keyless" instruments use air pressure or suction. The music book is specific to one system or the other (the slots in keyed instruments need to be slightly wider, and, for the note to sound at the required time, the slot needs to start slightly earlier). To extend longevity, mechanically read cardboard book music was typically strengthened with an application of shellac. Music rolls were typically fortified via the use of robust moisture-resisting paper stocks.

All the functions of the organ are (apart from the smallest organs) operated automatically from the music media. Larger instruments contain automatic organ stop register control and additional control tracks for operating percussion instruments, lighting effect and automaton figures.

== Builders ==
NOTE: non-exhaustive list of builders, past and present

List of mechanical organ builders
Name	Country	Location	Fairground	Dance	Street	Notes	Website
Artizan Factories, Inc	United States	North Tonawanda, NY	Yes				
B.A.B. Organ Company	United States	Brooklyn, NY	Yes			Converted European organs to the B.A.B. roll system	
Alfred Bruder	Germany	Waldkirch	Yes				
Gebrüder Bruder	Germany	Waldkirch	Yes				
Ignaz Bruder Söhne	Germany	Waldkirch	Yes				
Wilhelm Bruder Söhne	Germany	Waldkirch	Yes				
Chiappa & Sons	England	London	Yes				
Cocchi, Bacigalupo & Graffigna	Germany	Berlin	Yes				
Eugene de Kleist	United States	North Tonawanda, NY	Yes			Expatriate German who trained at Limonaire Frères in Waldkirch. While running his own business in London, was persuaded by American fairground ride maker Allan Herschell to start production in North Tonawanda, New York. Founding the North Tonawanda Barrel Organ Factory in 1892, he created the American Band organ sound. Business partner Rudolph Wurlitzer bought his interest in the business in 1909 after he was elected mayor of North Tonawanda	
Dean Organ Builders	England	Whitchurch, Bristol	Yes		Yes	John Dean established himself as wheelwright and cabinet maker circa 1818 in Bridport, but it was his grandson, Thomas Walter Dean who moved the family and their business to Bedminster in Bristol, following his marriage in 1899 to the daughter of a local dealer, William Wyatt. Walter Dean's son, Edwin, moved his business to Whitchurch in 1939 and so established the present site where the retail shop and workshop are today. Under the direction of Edwin Dean's son, Michael, the family turned its attention to the building of new traditional fairground and street organs. It was at this time that the company became known as Dean Organ Builders. The company introduced the 20 keyless book playing organ. The business continues in the hands of Richard and Sue Dean.	
Fr. Decap	Belgium	Herentals	Yes	Yes			
Decap, Gebroeders (Decap Brothers)	Belgium	Antwerp	Yes	Yes		Founded in 1902 by Aloïs Decap, the name was changed when taken over by the four sons: Livien, Frans, Léon, Camille. Maker of dance organs (early years), mechanical pianos (limited production, early years), street and fairground organs (1920s-1930s). Leading maker of dance organs, 1930s-present. Business now runs by Camille's daughter Martha, her husband Louis Mostmans and son Roger under the name Decap Brothers of Antwerp.	
Pierre Eich	Belgium	Ghent	Yes				
Marc Fournier	France	Seyssuel	Yes				
Frati & Co.	Germany	Berlin	Yes				
Carl Frei	Germany; Netherlands	Waldkirch; Breda	Yes			Started in Waldkirch, moved to Breda via Belgium. Returned to Waldkirch after World War II	
Gaudin Freres & Cie.	France	Paris	Yes	Yes		Successors to Marenghi	
Foucher-Gasparini	France	Paris	Yes				
Gavioli & Cie.	France	Paris	Yes	Yes		At one point, the largest organ builder in the world. Ceased trading in 1910, with patents, designs and brand sold to rival Limonaire Frères	
Theo Heesbeen	Netherlands	Tilburg		Yes			
Louis Hooghuys	Belgium	Geraardsbergen	Yes	Yes			
Jäger und Brommer	Germany	Waldkirch	Yes		Yes		
Johnson Organ Company	United States	Fargo, ND	Yes				
La Salvia	Argentina	Buenos Aires	Yes			Since 1870	
Le Ludion	France	Toulouse	Yes				
Lemoine-Dussaux	France	Paris	Yes	Yes			
Limonaire Frères	France	Paris	Yes			Founded in Paris in the 1830s by a group of brothers, the company went through various iterations before becoming the second largest producer of organs behind Gavioli. At their height from 1900 to 1914, they had factories in both Paris and Waldkirch, Germany. Bought the patents and what remained of rival Gavioli from administrators in 1910. German factory was confiscated during World War I, and after return in 1921 sold to Alfred Bruder in 1924. Company ceased trading in 1936.	
Charles Marenghi & Cie	France	Paris	Yes	Yes			
Usines Theofiel Mortier	Belgium	Antwerp		Yes			
Nederlands Boekorgel Centrum	Netherlands	Tilburg	Yes	Yes	Yes		
Niagara Musical Instrument Mfg. Co.	United States	North Tonawanda, NY	Yes				
Emmanuel Odin	France	Saint-Just-Saint-Rambert		Yes			
John Page	England	Milton Keynes	Yes			Formerly Page & Howard	
G. Perlee Draaiorgels	Netherlands	Amsterdam		Yes			
Elbert Pluer	Netherlands	Bussum		Yes		Son of Anton Pluer	
Pooker Organ Works	United States	Hawthorne, CA	Yes				
Gebrüder Richter	Germany	Düsseldorf	Yes				
Andreas Ruth & Sohn	Germany	Waldkirch	Yes			Makers of the organ formerly at the Myrtle Beach Pavilion amusement park, now located at a smaller park in the city.	
Stinson Organ Company	United States	Bellefontaine, OH	Yes				
Sturm Olivier	France	Saint-Jean-du-Pin			Yes		
van Steenput Frères	Belgium	Puurs	Yes		Yes	Built and converted fairground and street organs circa 1890–1930	
Verbeeck	Belgium; England	Antwerp; London	Yes	Yes	Yes	Five generations of family members have built and repaired portable hand-cranked organs, street organs (including the world-famous Dutch street organ "The Arab"), fairground organs, and dance organs since 1884. Business names have included: Jan Verbeeck (1884–1914, Antwerp, Belgium); J. Verbeeck & Sons (Birmingham, then London, England, 1914–1949); Pierre Verbeeck (Antwerp, Belgium, 1918–1938); Verbekson (Deurne, Belgium, 1944–1947); Verbeeck Zoon (St. Job-in-'t-Goor, Belgium, 1965–1979); J. Verbeeck: since 1979, Johnny Verbeeck and his wife Marijke have operated the business in St. Job-in-'t-Goor. Since 2015, Jeffrey Verbeeck continued the business	
Heinrich Voigt Orgelbau	Germany	Höchst, Frankfurt am Main	Yes				
Gebrüder Wellershaus	Germany	Mülheim	Yes				
Fritz Wrede	Germany	Hanover	Yes	Yes	Yes		
Rudolph Wurlitzer Company	United States	North Tonawanda, NY	Yes	Yes	Yes	After collaborating with Eugene de Kleist on the Wurlitzer Tonophone, bought into the North Tonawanda Barrel Organ Factory business from 1897, and then bought De Kleist's interest in 1908. Moved all production of organs to the site, and began heavily investing. Organ production ceased in 1942, with the factory turned over to producing proximity fuzes. Post war, the factory produced various Wurlitzer lines, including radios and jukeboxes. The factory closed in 1973.	

== See also ==
- Barrel organ
- Dance organ
- Calliope
- Mechanical organ
- Orchestrion
- Organ grinder
