= Limonaire Frères =

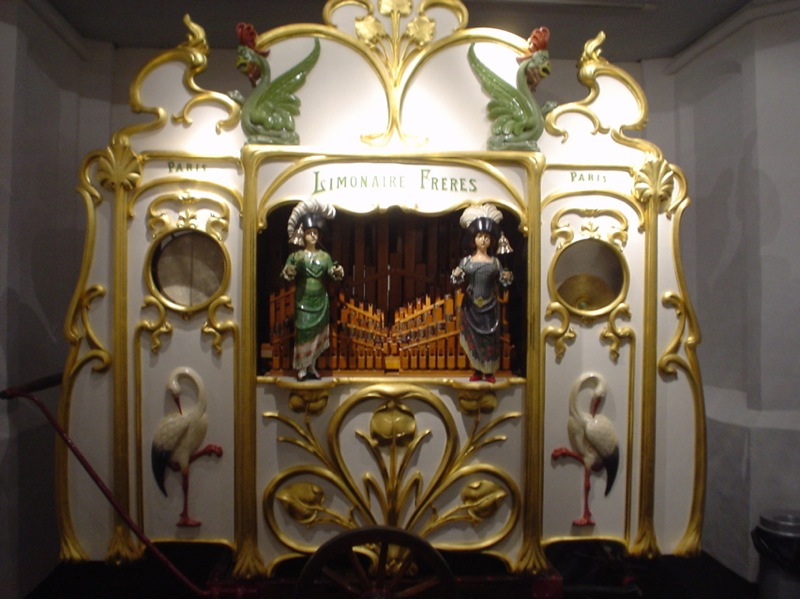
The 52-key 'De Gouden Limonaire' (The Golden Limonaire) in the Museum Speelklok in Utrecht, The Netherlands

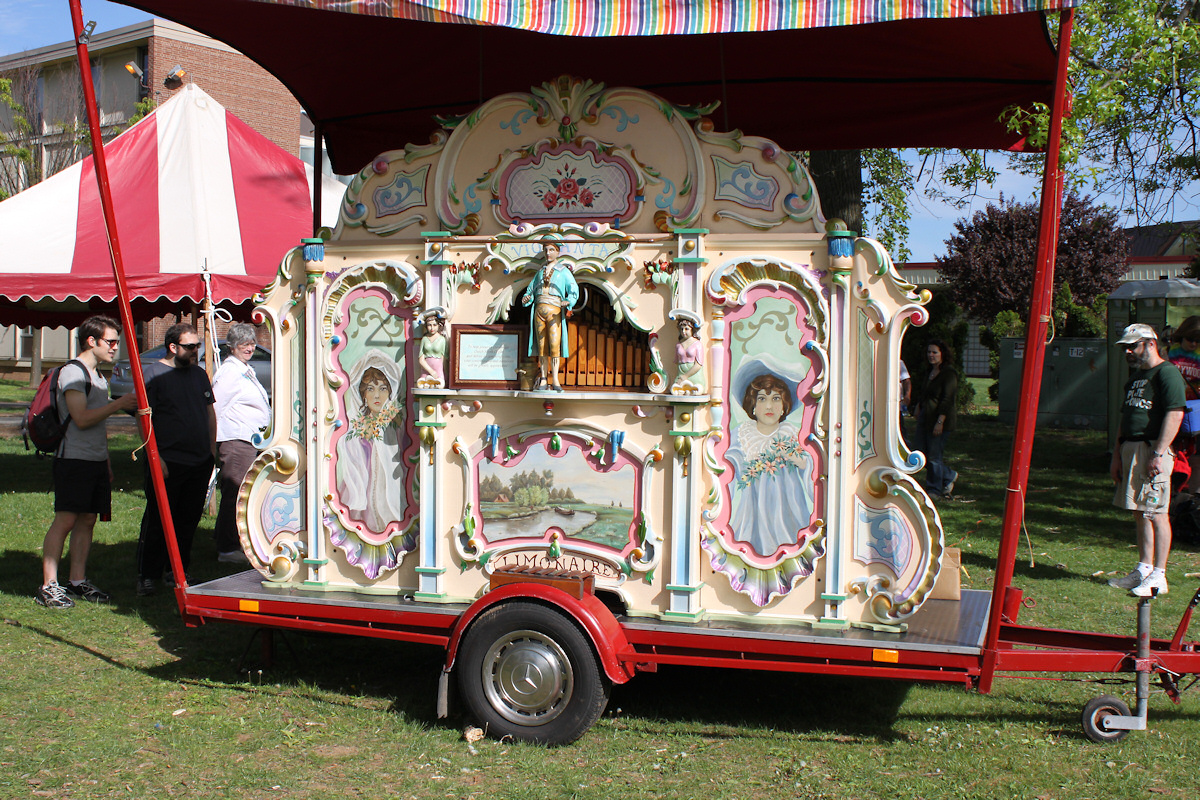
Small Limonaire Frères street organ, with decorated facade

Limonaire Frères were an amusement ride, street organ and fairground organ builder, based in Paris, France, during the 19th and early 20th century.

== History ==
=== 1839 to 1886 ===
Started by the Limonaire brothers Joseph and Antoine in 1839, as piano and organ builders, after only three years the two brothers separated and set up their own companies. Joseph concentrated on the piano business while Antoine continued to expand into organ building.

By 1852 the company, under Antoine's management, was based in the rue Neuve des Petits Champs, and by the 1870s had added a workshop in the rue St. Sabin, building portable barrel and orchestral organs.

=== 1886 to 1908 ===
After the death of Antoine aged 70 in 1886, his two sons Eugène and Camille established a new factory in the Avenue Daumesnil, in the same area of Paris as the organ building firms Gasparini and Gavioli. A steam engine was installed in 1890, and the company expanded at a fast pace.

The two brothers attended many international expositions including those at London (1888), Chicago (1893), Amsterdam (1895) and St Louis (1904). In total, between 1849 and 1906, 29 medals from the expositions were awarded to the Limonaire company. Between 1895 and 1916, the company filed patents for twelve inventions and one brand name, the Orchestrophone. In 1894 the piano range of instruments was withdrawn from general sale, but in its place came a large variety of fairground rides, some made in partnership with other companies.

Limonaire never opened an office in the United States, due to the imposition from 1892 of high import tariffs by the United States Government. In 1893, carousel builder William Herschell traveled to London, England to meet Limonaire employee Eugene de Kleist. Backed by Herschell, in 1893 DeKeist set up band organ production in North Tonawanda, New York, founding the North Tonawanda Barrel Organ Factory. As parts were not subject to the import tariffs, many of the company's early organs had Limonaire components.

=== 1908 to 1936 ===
In 1907, the economic crisis in the USA severely affected the export market of Gavioli in the German Black Forest town of Waldkirch, centre of the German fairground organ industry, with the result that Gavioli ceased trading there. This allowed Limonaire the opportunity to be able to take over the premises and remaining stock in 1908, and business became successful enough that a new factory was built on land previously owned by Richard Bruder in 1912. Many organs were produced by Limonaire in these years, under the "Orchestronphone" trade name, often incorporating a bioscope. In the heyday of La Belle Époque, only the other Parisian firm of Gavioli was larger.

The confiscation of the German factory in 1917 during World War I, signalled the end of peak production, and indeed, after the war, Limonaire chose not to return to Germany, their factory eventually being bought in 1926 by Alfred Bruder who continued building organs. Camille Limonaire died in 1920 and Eugène sold his shares in the company, a new company then being created in 1920 under the management of Charles Albert Demouts and later Louis Moutier. Unfortunately demand for the organs and merry-go-rounds continued to decline, and in 1929 the Limonaire company went into liquidation. It was bought immediately and run as a non-specialist company for a short time, taking over one by one the names and remaining assets of once famous organ companies such as Gasparini, Gaudin, Marenghi and Gavioli, but this ultimately failed and by 1932 all stock was being sold off.

In 1936 the factory at 166 Avenue Daumesnil, Paris, was closed and demolished.

== Preservation ==
Today, due to their fine sound and high quality, Limonaire organs are considered highly collectable. Many have survived in museum collections and in active use around the world, although only limited numbers remain in their original condition.

The French language reference Le Petit Robert de la langue Française considers the name Limonaire to be generally defined as "a barrel organ mainly used for carousel music".

== See also ==
- Draaiorgel de Vijf Beelden — Dutch street organ of the Five Figures, built as Gasparini, then rebuilt at Limonaire Frères, Carl Frei, etc.
