= Marenghi =

Marenghi may refer to:

- Jerry Maren (1920–2018), American actor (born Gerard Marenghi)
- Garth Marenghi, a fictional horror author
  - Garth Marenghi's Darkplace, a television series
- Charles Marenghi & Cie, a French organ building company
