= Duinrand =

Coordinates: 51°40′1.48″N 5°7′48.78″E

- Interactive map of Duinrand

Restaurant information
- Closed: 2002
- Chef: Wulf Engel
- Food type: French
- Rating: Michelin Guide
- Location: Steegerf 2, Drunen, 5151 RB, Netherlands

Duinrand is a defunct restaurant in Drunen, in the Netherlands. It was a fine dining restaurant that was awarded one Michelin star in 1985 and retained that rating until 1995.

First owner and head chef was Menno Huybrechts. In 1992, he sold the restaurant to Wulf Engel.

The restaurant closed down in 2002, due to bankruptcy.

== See also ==
- List of Michelin starred restaurants in the Netherlands
