= Stoomcarrousel =

Indoor carousel at Efteling

Coordinates: 51°39′04″N 5°02′56″E

The Stoomcarrousel is an attraction of the Efteling amusement park in the Netherlands. It is an indoor carousel situated in what is now known as the "Carousel Palace" (in Dutch "Carrouselpaleis"; formerly "De Efteling Stoomcarrousel" ("Efteling Steam Carousel") and originally "Janvier's Stoomcaroussel" ("Janvier's Steam Carousel").

== History ==
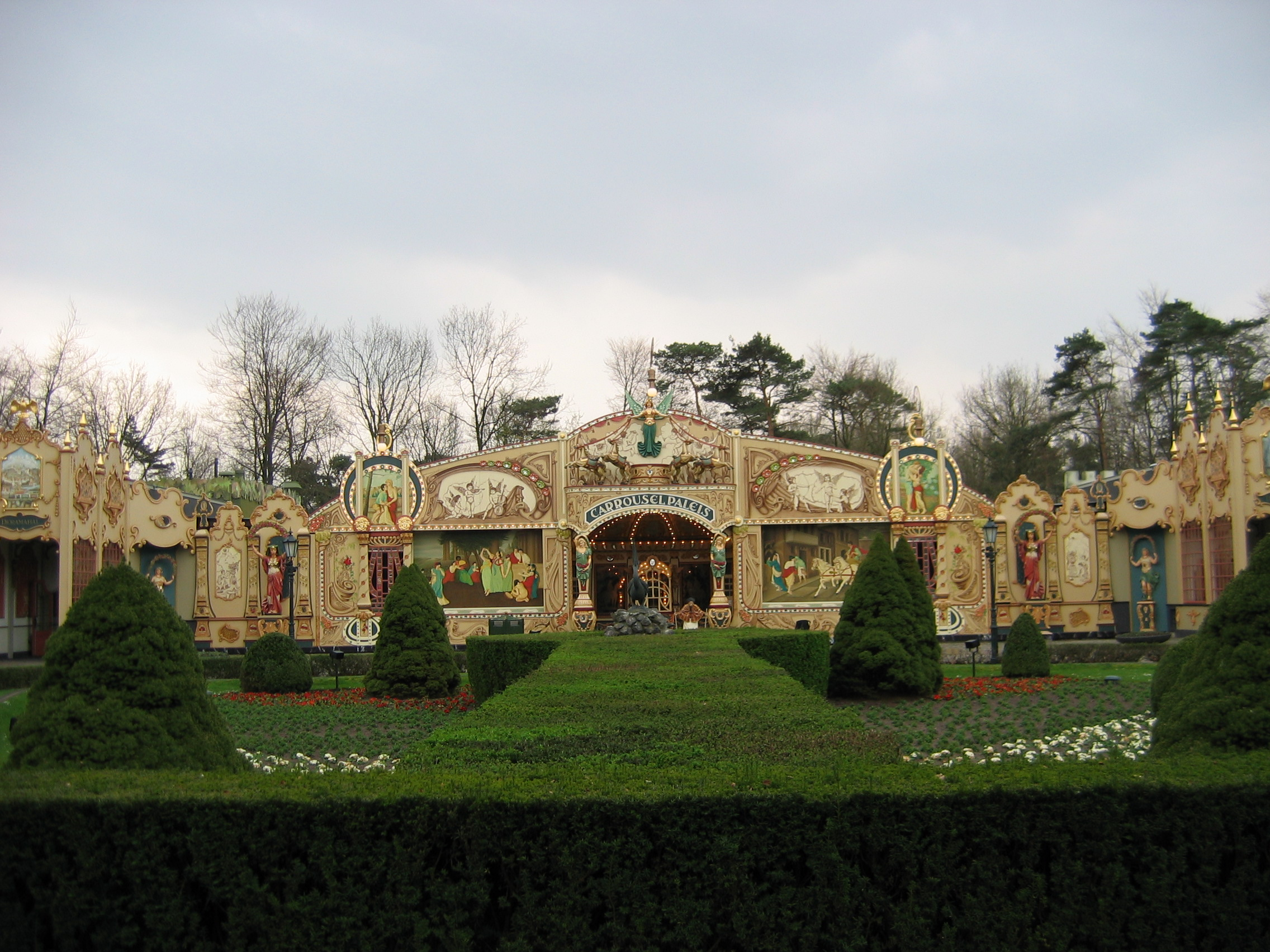
The Steam Carousel Palace

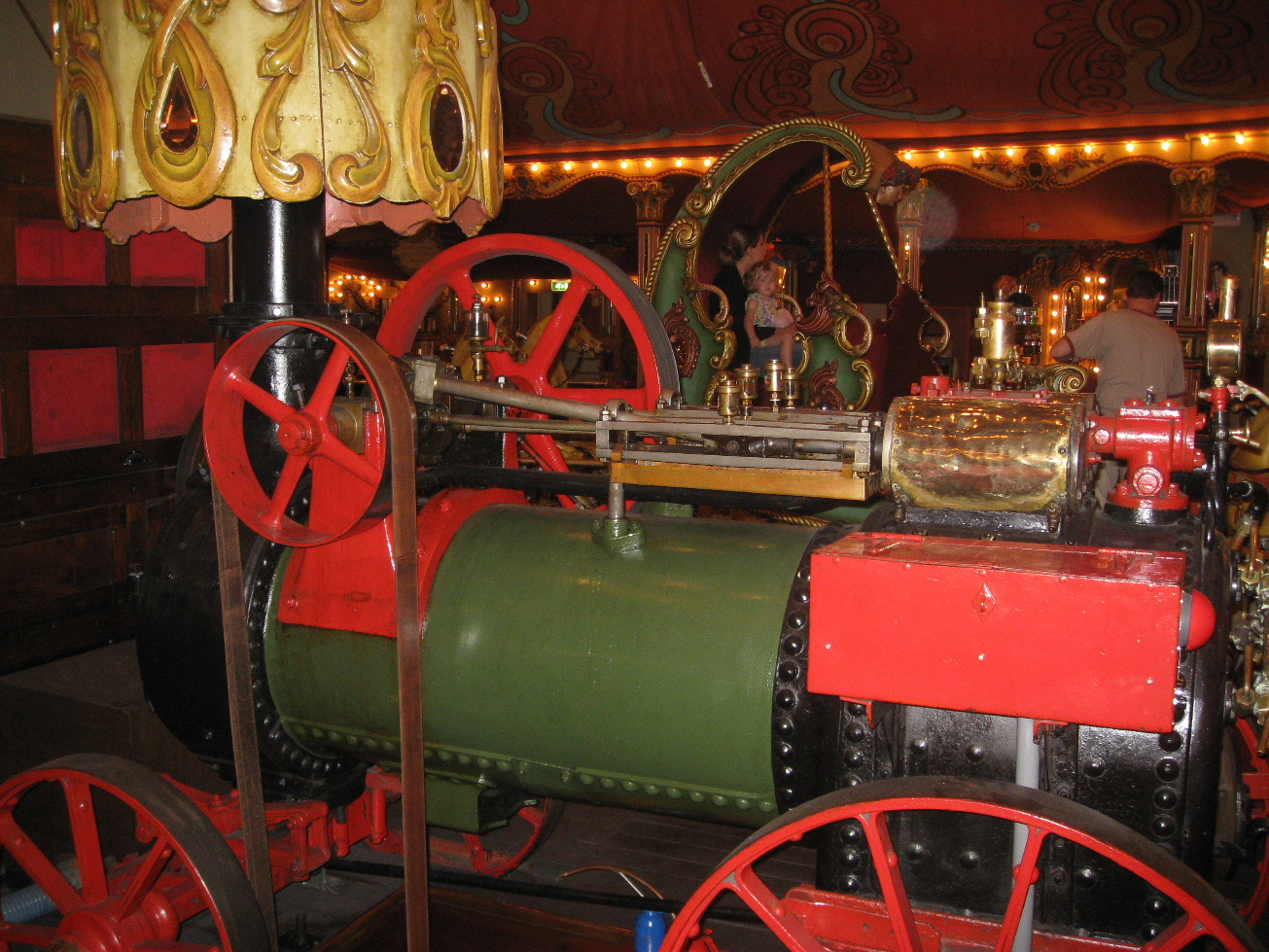
König engine

The carousel, dating from 1895, was bought by Efteling from Hendrik Janvier, who had toured with it to local funfairs, and has been operating in the park since 11 May 1956. Hendrik Janvier (1868–1932), considered to be the founding father of the salon carousel, sold the Carousel because of the high costs and declining income. Building the ride up took 4 days and it had to be transported with 25 train carriages and trucks.

Rumour has it that Anton Pieck, the most important creative designer of Efteling, pushed for the purchase, because he rode the carousel as a child in Haarlem.

There also is a bar area within the salon carousel. The area surrounding these carousels was normally used for entertainment, eating and dancing in past times.

In 1956 the carousel was the only attraction in the building, but in 1966 the Water Organ, in 1971 the Diorama and in 1972 the Victorian Theater were also set up in the Carousel Palace.

== The ride ==
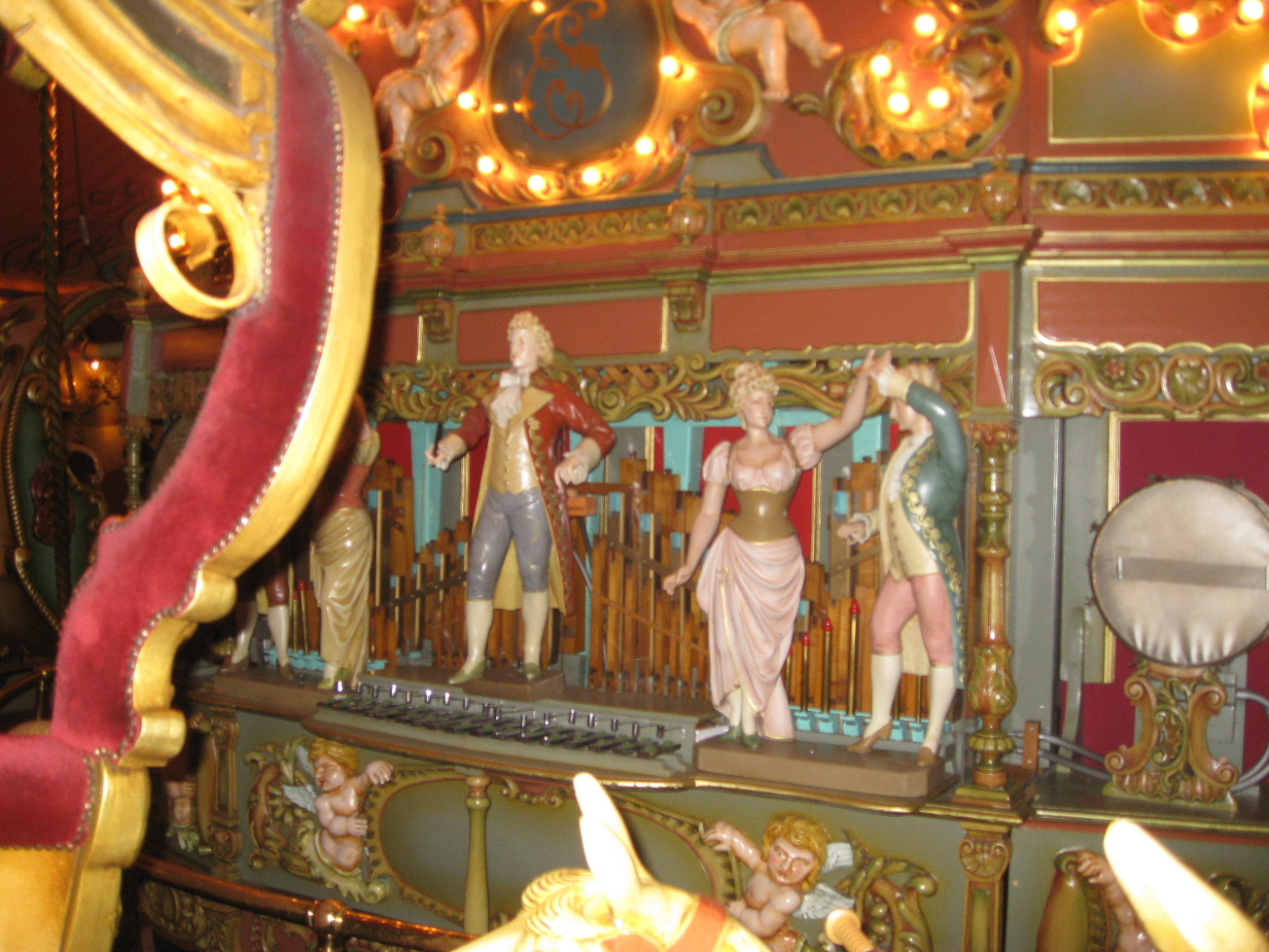
Detail of the Gavioli band organ playing at the centre of the carousel

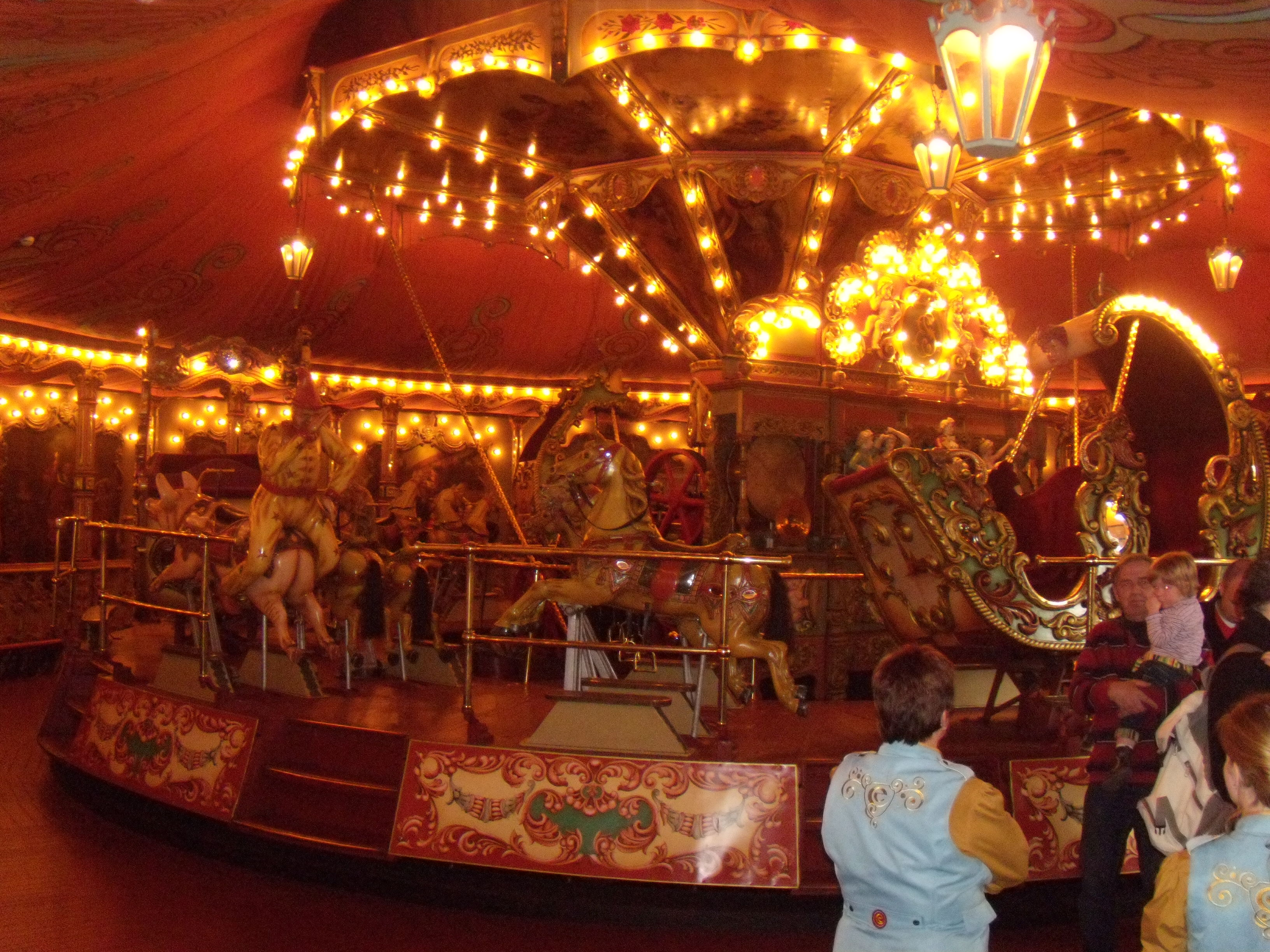
Walkway around the Carousel, with paintings by Andreas Giezen

Although the mechanics are still visible, the carousel was only powered by a König steam centre engine (under license from Savages) until the 1970s; nowadays it is powered by electricity. The seats of the carousel are in the form of animals, such as 22 Hübner horses and 2 Karl Müller carved pigs (with clown thumbing his nose at the riders behind), and 4 carved Moulina gondolas and coaches, all turning to the music of an original Gavioli organ (only 5 remaining worldwide). The steps for mounting the horses and entering the gondola are fixed to the ride platform. The ride moves on a rail track under the platform, with cams to rock the animals and swing the gondolas.

Ride length: 2 minutes
Ride capacity: 750 passengers/ hour
