= Charles Marenghi & Cie =

French organ building company

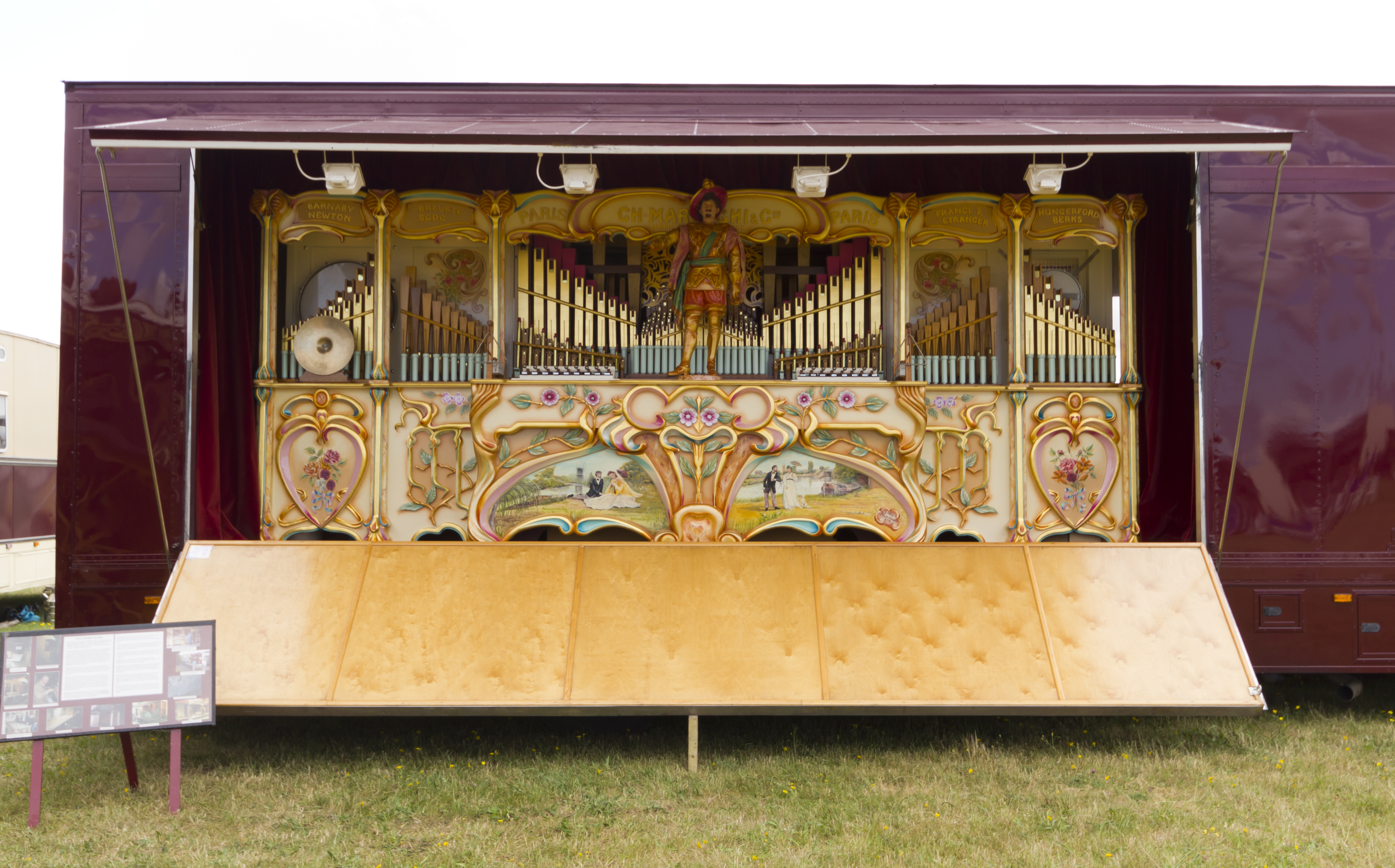
Replica Ch. Marenghi & Cie fairground organ (exhibited at Gloucestershire Steam & Vintage Extravaganza 2013)

Charles Marenghi & Cie was a French fairground organ manufacturer.

Charles Marenghi started his career working in the famous organ factory of Gavioli & Cie in Paris. By 1900, he was chief of the Gavioli workshops. After troubles between the associates he decided to start his own business in 1903, in the former Gavioli factory at the Avenue de Taillebourg near the Place de la Nation in Paris. His products had a strong resemblance to Gavioli's organs; however, Marenghi added several inventions of his own, like the "Grélotophone", a register of tuned sleighbells for which he was granted a patent in 1914. He sold many fairground organs, especially to the UK, where some of his best instruments may still be seen and heard.
