= Wetryk =

Wetryk was the stage name of Antonio Pastacaldi (Livorno, 30 November 1890 – Livorno, 22 April 1936), a successful Italian practitioner of stage magic in the period between World War I and World War II.

== Life ==
Antonio Pastacaldi was the son of a theatre manager, Ugo Pastacaldi, and of a pianist, Emma Oneto. The mother died while giving birth to Antonio. A local tradition in Livorno claims that baby Antonio was also regarded as dead and placed in the open coffin together with the mother, until a cousin of his father realized he was alive.

After Emma’s death, his father married soprano Ida Nobili, whose friend, actor Alessandro Parrini, initiated Antonio to the art of magic. At age 16, Antonio attended a show in Livorno by stage magician Cesare Watry, an Italian from Ravenna who achieved more success in Spain and Brazil than in his own native country. Antonio asked Watry to hire him in his company, and followed his 1910 tour in Latin America. How much Pastacaldi learned from Watry is a matter of dispute. Some regard Watry as Pastacaldi’s mentor, while Pastacaldi’s daughter insisted that her father was mostly self-taught and the influence of Watry was not crucial.

In 1914, Pastacaldi left Watry and formed his own company, where he initially performed under the name of Zeo. Soon, however, he changed his stage name to Wetryk, intending this as a homage to Watry. During World War I, Wetryk’s company performed mostly in Portugal, Spain, and South America. There, he developed a distinctive style of magic, presenting his shows in Louis XIV, Turkish, or Japanese settings, and performed in front of royalty and celebrities, acquiring great fame.

After the war, Wetryk returned to Livorno and married in 1921 one of his assistants, Amneris Remaggi. Not only was his wife independently wealthy, but his shows in Italy became very successful and he earned enough money to retire after his daughter Liliana was born in 1927. Wetryk achieved local fame as a chess player too. In 1935, he started training for a return to the stage, but the project was frustrated by cancer, which killed him in 1936.

== False Wetryk incident ==
After Wetryk’s death, in 1943, his heirs sold his equipment to a mediocre magician named Melchiorre Zatelli, whose stage name was Armandis (born in Trento in 1906). Although Pastacaldi’s family claimed that a condition for the sale was that Armandis should not use the name Wetryk on stage, he did exactly so, leading some audiences to believe that Wetryk had survived the war. The poor quality of the performances was a blow to the fame of Wetryk. Armandis was still engaged in a controversy with the Pastacaldi family about the name Wetryk when he retired in 1955.

== In popular culture ==
In the Italian detective novel Il Commissario Botteghi e il mago (2018) by Diego Collaveri, the title character investigates a series of homicides connected with the sale of Wetryk’s home (which in fact still exists in Livorno, at the address Viale Italia 281), for which two stage magicians and a collector compete.
