= Carl Frei =

German organ builder, composer and music arranger (1884–1967)

Carl Frei (4 April 1884 – 10 May 1967) was a German organ builder, composer and music arranger who founded a company that manufactured fairground and street organs.

Born in Schiltach in the Black Forest, Frei studied music in his early years. Aged nine, he was studying harmony and counterpoint at the Waldkirch academy of music. From age 14 on, well-known musical instrument factories such as Bruder, Gavioli, Mortier and DeVreese were employing him in Waldkirch and Paris.

After World War I, Frei had to leave Belgium and he made his way to Breda, the Netherlands to repair what were popularly known as Dutch street organs, but were actually built in almost every mainland European country except the Netherlands, which was where they were most populous. Pre World War I, street organs were hand cranked and easily portable, but fell out of tune and repair due to the undulations of the cobbled Dutch streets. Frei started maintaining organs, but noticed that many owners wanted something louder (thanks to the increased street noise made by early cars), and distinct (thanks to the wider availability of the record player).

Frei began to make his own organs from 1920, with a number of innovations. Firstly he devised a new organ register called the "bourdon céleste," which replaced the high-maintenance clarinets and vox humana's with two rows of stopped pipes with very bright intonation, one row tuned slightly sharp to the other. Besides rebuilding older organs, Carl Frei started building new ones according to this concept. Into these he incorporated an amplified violin section by adding a violin-celeste stop, which was also tuned to this floating sound temperament. He also introduced the "undamaris" stop in the counter melody section while in the large (72 and 90 keys) organs they were incorporating stops with names like "bifoon I" (in melody) and "bifoon II" (in the countermelody). The biggest street version of these organs, with 90 keys, were true "castles of the street;" while the "Carl Frei Traveling Concert Organ" was considered to be the largest traveling fair organ in the world, with 112 keys. One of these 112-key models is now in the Thursford Collection in Norfolk, England, and was purchased by the collection's founder, the late George Cushing in 1965.

Forced to leave the Netherlands after the Second World War, Frei returned to Waldkirch and the business continued, together with son Carl Frei Jnr, until the death of Carl Frei Jnr. in 1997. Carl Frei sr. died in Waldkirch in 1967, 83 years old.

== Gallery ==
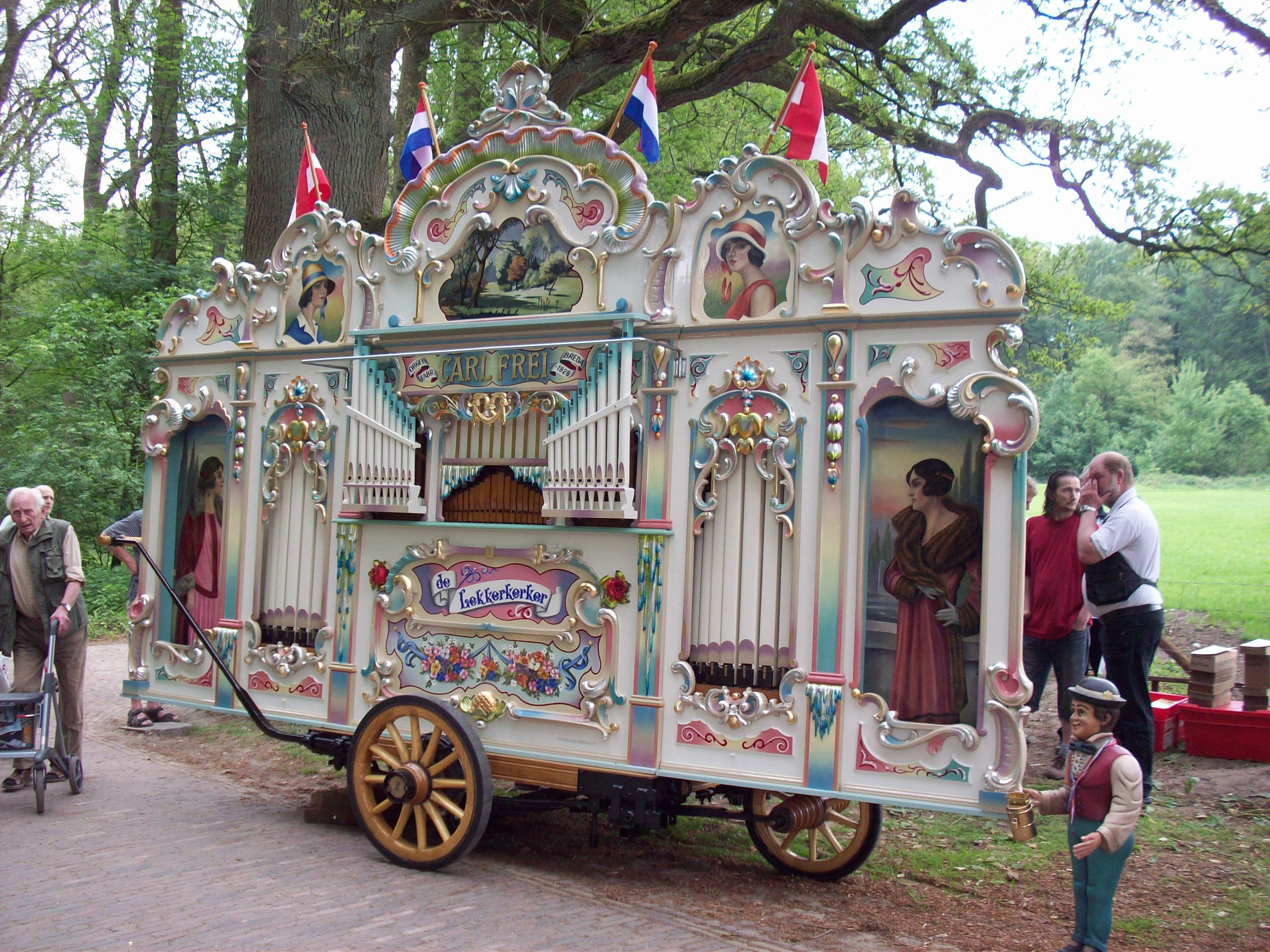
Lekkerkerker barrel organ, built by Carl Frei in 1926. (90 keys)

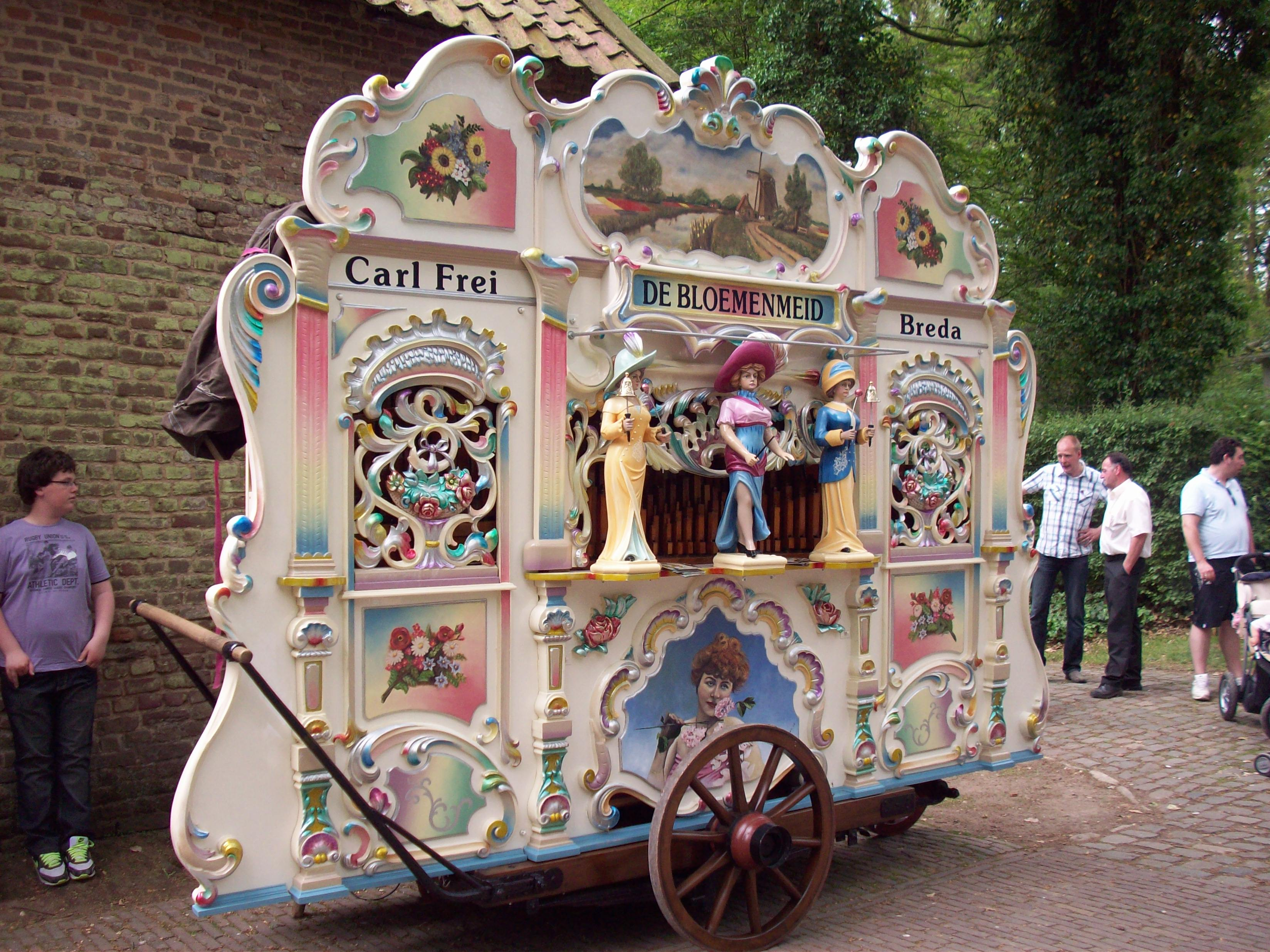
Bloemenmeid barrel organ (Flower Girl), originally built as Gavioli cylinder organ.

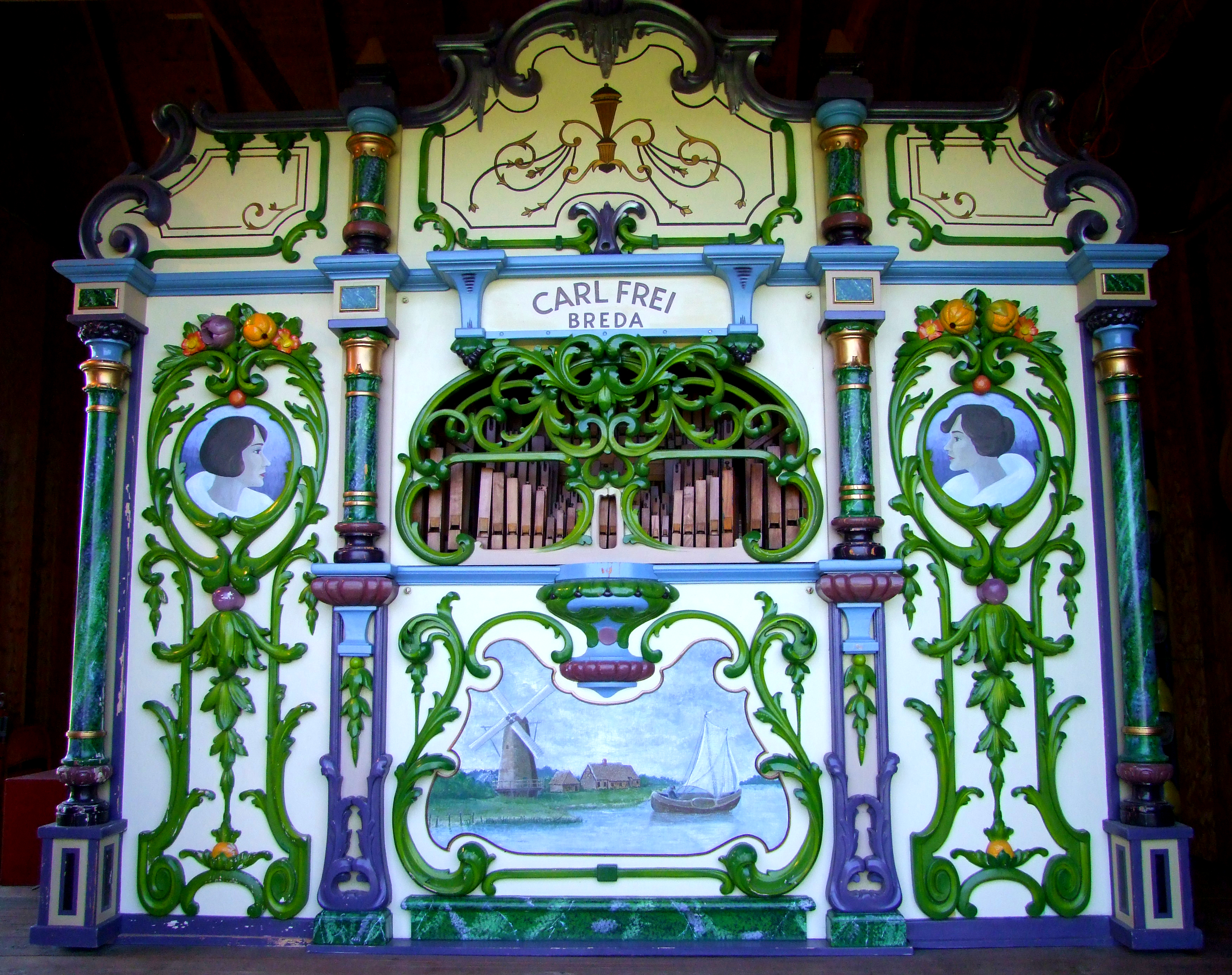
Antique Amsterdam Street Organ at Holland, Michigan, Windmill Island.

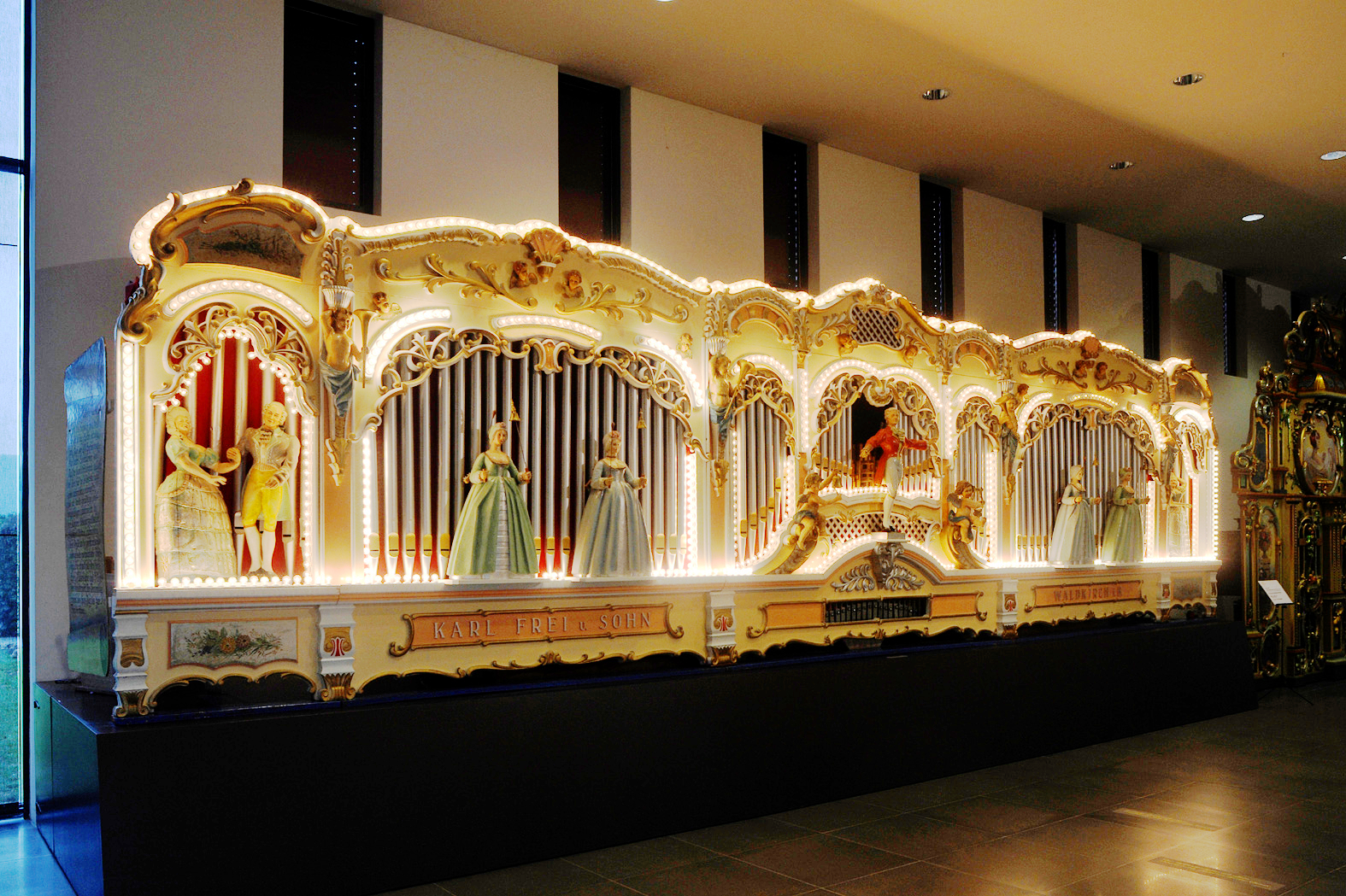
Fair organ by Karl Frei & Sohn, Waldkirch, exhibited at Museum für Musikautomaten, Seewen.

== See also ==
- Draaiorgel de Vijf Beelden — Dutch street organ of the Five Figures, built as Gasparini, then rebuilt at Limonaire Frères, Carl Frei, etc.
