= Anton Pieck =

Dutch painter (1895–1987)

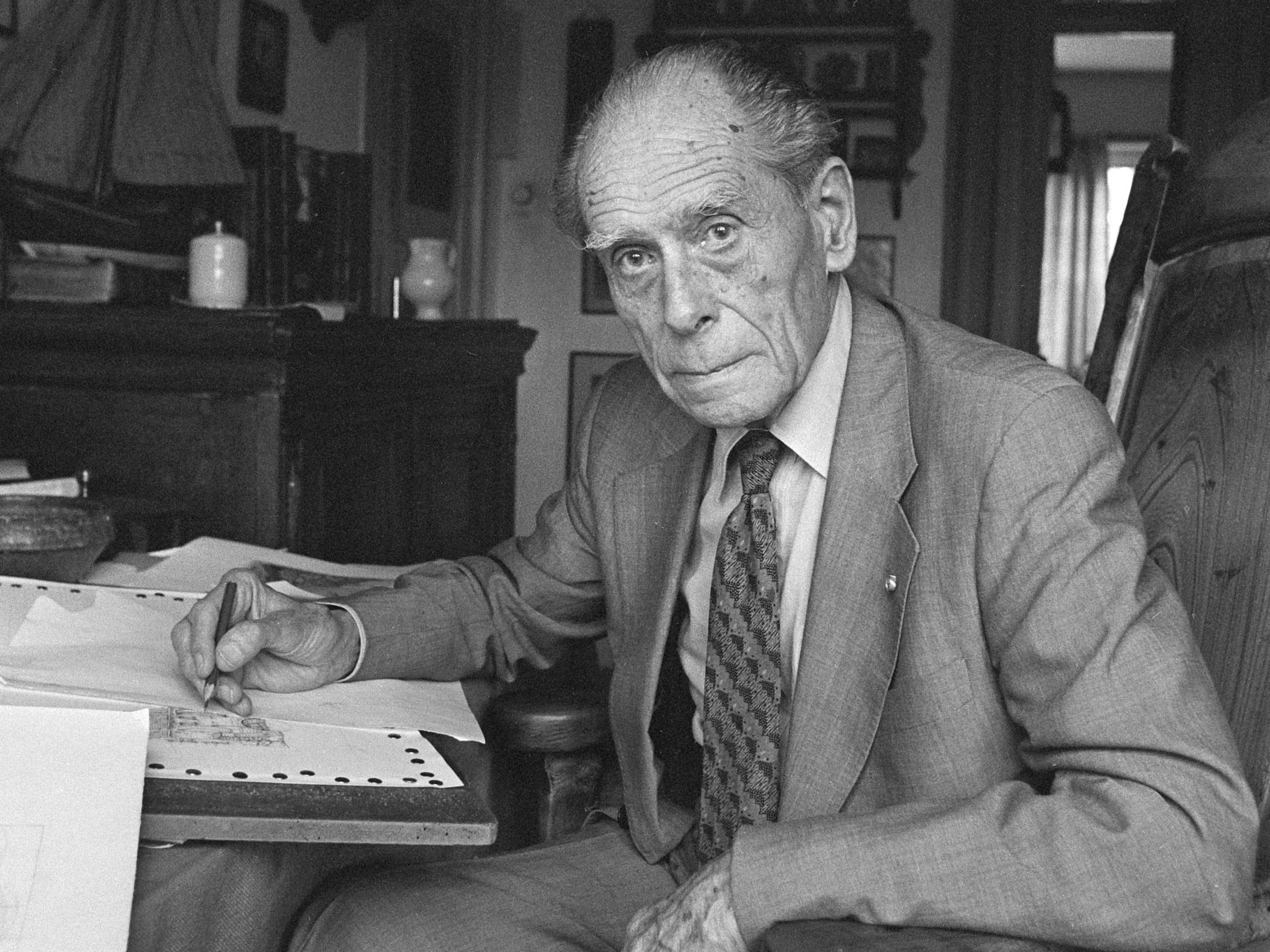
- Anton Pieck in 1980
- Born: Anton Franciscus Pieck; 19 April 1895; Den Helder, Netherlands
- Died: 24 November 1987 (aged 92); Overveen, Netherlands
- Known for: Painting, Illustration art

Anton Franciscus Pieck (19 April 1895 – 24 November 1987) was a Dutch painter, artist and graphic artist. His works are noted for their nostalgic or fairy tale-like character and are widely popular, appearing regularly on cards and calendars. He is also known for being the first designer of the famous Dutch theme park Efteling.

== Biography ==
Anton Franciscus Pieck was born on 19 April 1895 in Den Helder in the Netherlands. He was the son of Henri Christiaan Pieck and Petronella Neijfs, and twin brother of the painter and illustrator Henri Christiaan Pieck. Pieck married Jo van Poelvoorde (died 1983) in 1922. The couple had three children, Elsa, Anneke and Max (died 1986).

Between 1912 and 1920 Pieck was an art teacher at the Bik en Vaandrager Institute in The Hague. He took the same job at the Kennemer Lyceum in Overveen, where he worked until 1960. From the 1920s on he became well known for his book illustrations, which among others were published in the Dutch children's magazine Zonneschijn. Some of these were presented in a text comics format. His most famous book illustrations were Grimm's Fairy Tales and Arabian Nights. Pieck was furthermore a painter of nostalgic 19th century city scenes and winter scenes, which are still popular to this day as images on greeting cards and calendars.

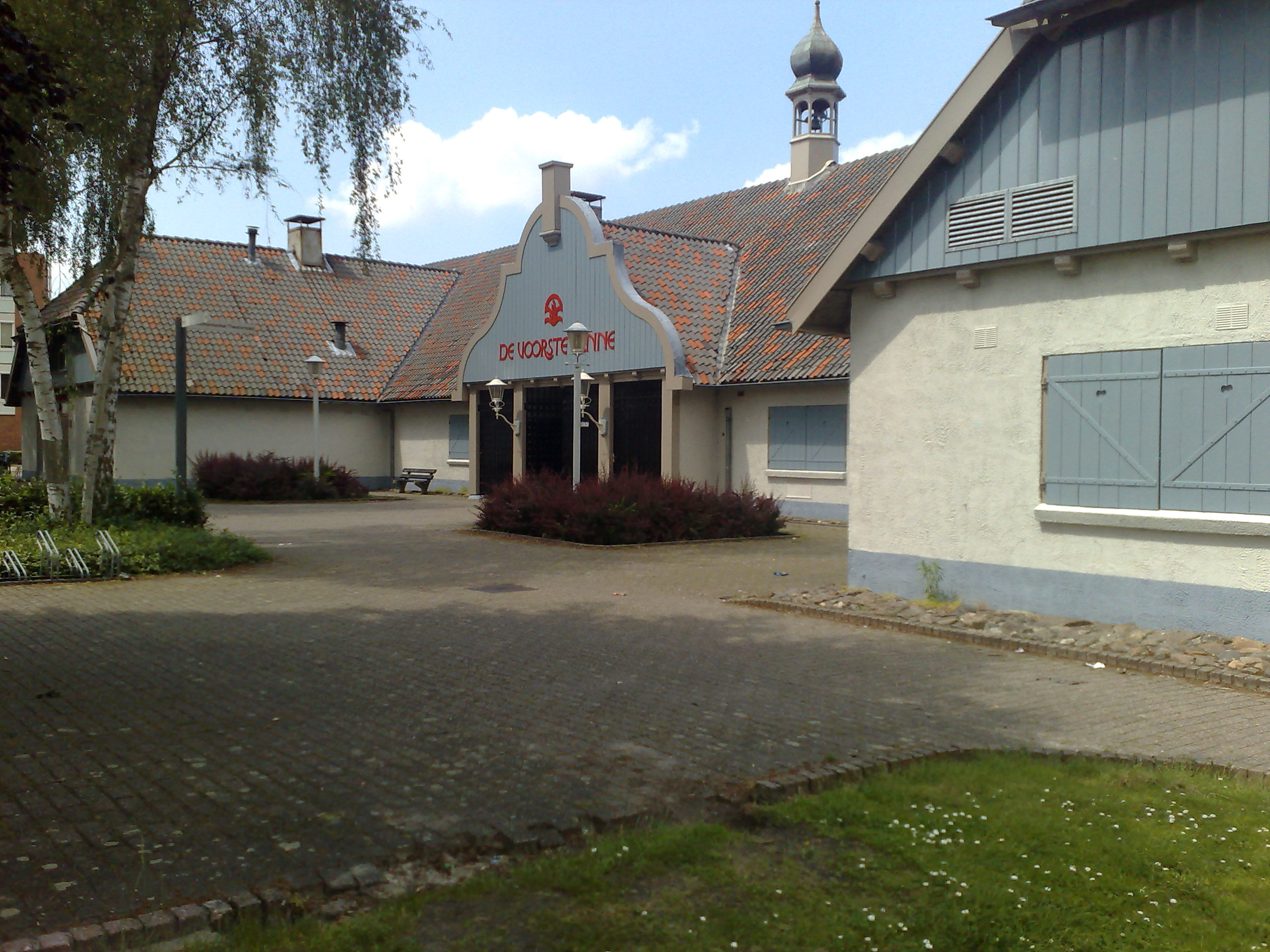
Part of the former Autotron museum in Drunen (later located in Rosmalen), with the typical Anton Pieck colors

== Efteling ==
From 1952 to 1974, Pieck was responsible for designing almost everything for fairy-tale park Efteling in Kaatsheuvel, now one of the major theme parks in Europe. His work for the Efteling has been of huge importance for the future of the park, since almost all later designers used his graphic characteristics in their designs (such as materials, colors and shapes).

== Anton Pieck Museum ==
In 1984 the Anton Pieck Museum was opened at the Achterstraat in Hattem. The museum is called "Huis voor Anton Pieck" ("House for Anton Pieck"). It exhibits various art works by Pieck.

== Trivia ==
- In the comic Spike and Suzy, the characters visit De Efteling three times, in De Efteling-elfjes, in Fata Morgana and in De belhamel-bende. In this last comic, Pieck has a cameo role when Lambik is called by someone who knows where Tante Sidonia is.
- Dutch poet and singer Drs. P wrote a song, "Winterdorp," as a homage to Pieck's cosy drawing style.
- In a 2004 poll regarding De Grootste Nederlander (The Greatest Dutchman), the general public placed Pieck in 81st place.
- Pieck illustrated the Dutch version of the book The Wonderful Adventures of Nils (Nils Holgersson).
- In Kaatsheuvel a LOM school has been named after Anton Pieck.
- In 1972 he designed the classic car museum "Autotron" in Drunen. After the museum collection relocated to Rosmalen, the building has been used as a cultural centre housing a broad range of activities, including theatre, restaurants, music school, and club house for the elderly. The building's name was changed to "De Voorste Venne".
