= Foucher-Gasparini =

French organ building company

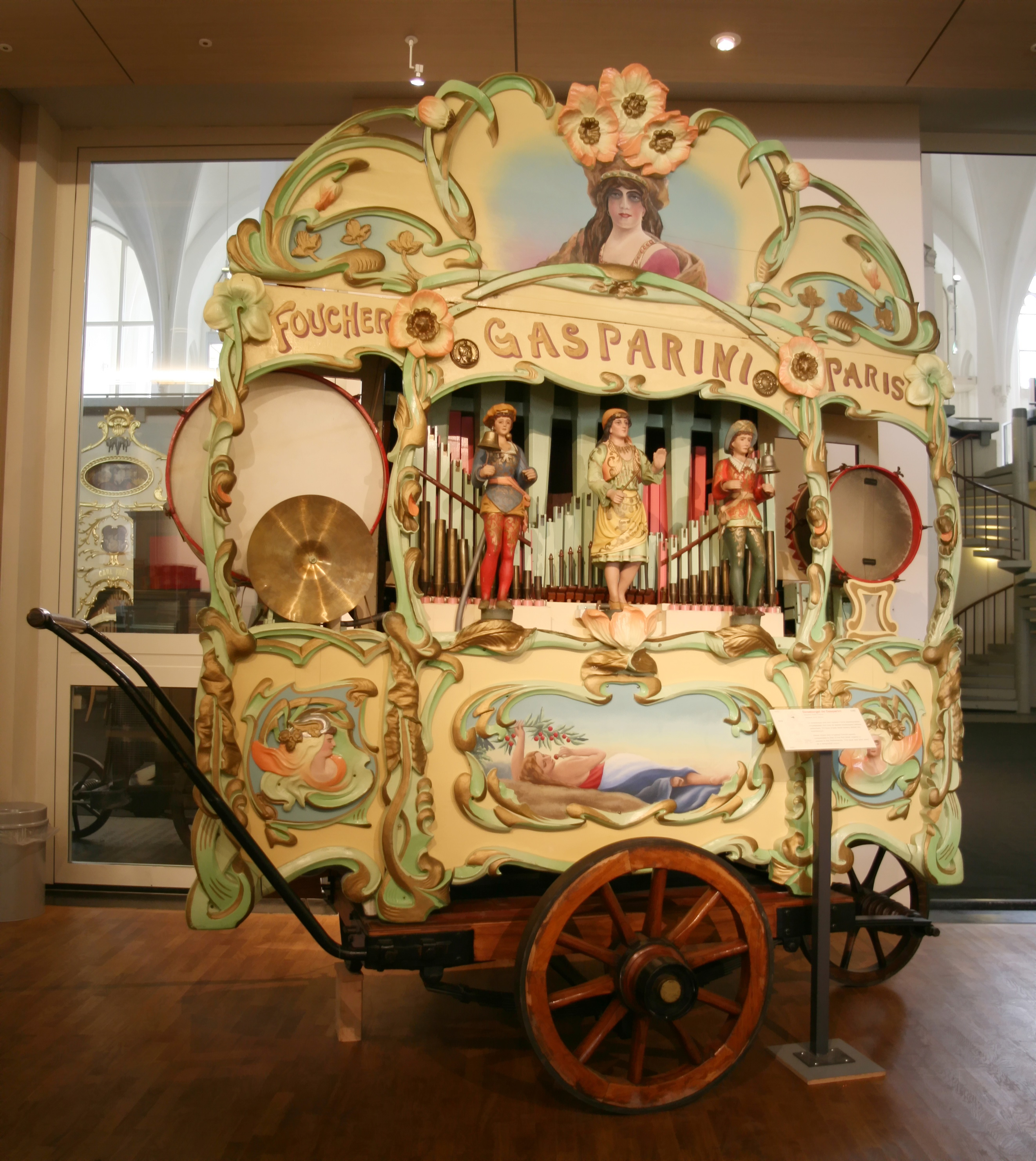
Foucher-Gasparini street organ (exhibited at Museum Speelklok)

Foucher-Gasparini was a builder of barrel organs. It was based in Paris, France and existed from 1865 to 1928.

Gasparini travelled from Italy to learn organ building, forming a partnership with Frenchman Foucher in Paris from 1865. The organs were noted for their soft tones, with their trademarks being the rounded shape of the front piece, with many curls and other decorations.

The company exported many organs to the Netherlands, and 52-key Gasparini organs are common in France. It remained in business until 1928 when it was bought by Limonaire Frères.

== See also ==
- Draaiorgel de Vijf Beelden — Dutch street organ of the Five Figures, built as Gasparini, then rebuilt at Limonaire Frères, Carl Frei, etc.
