= Drunen =

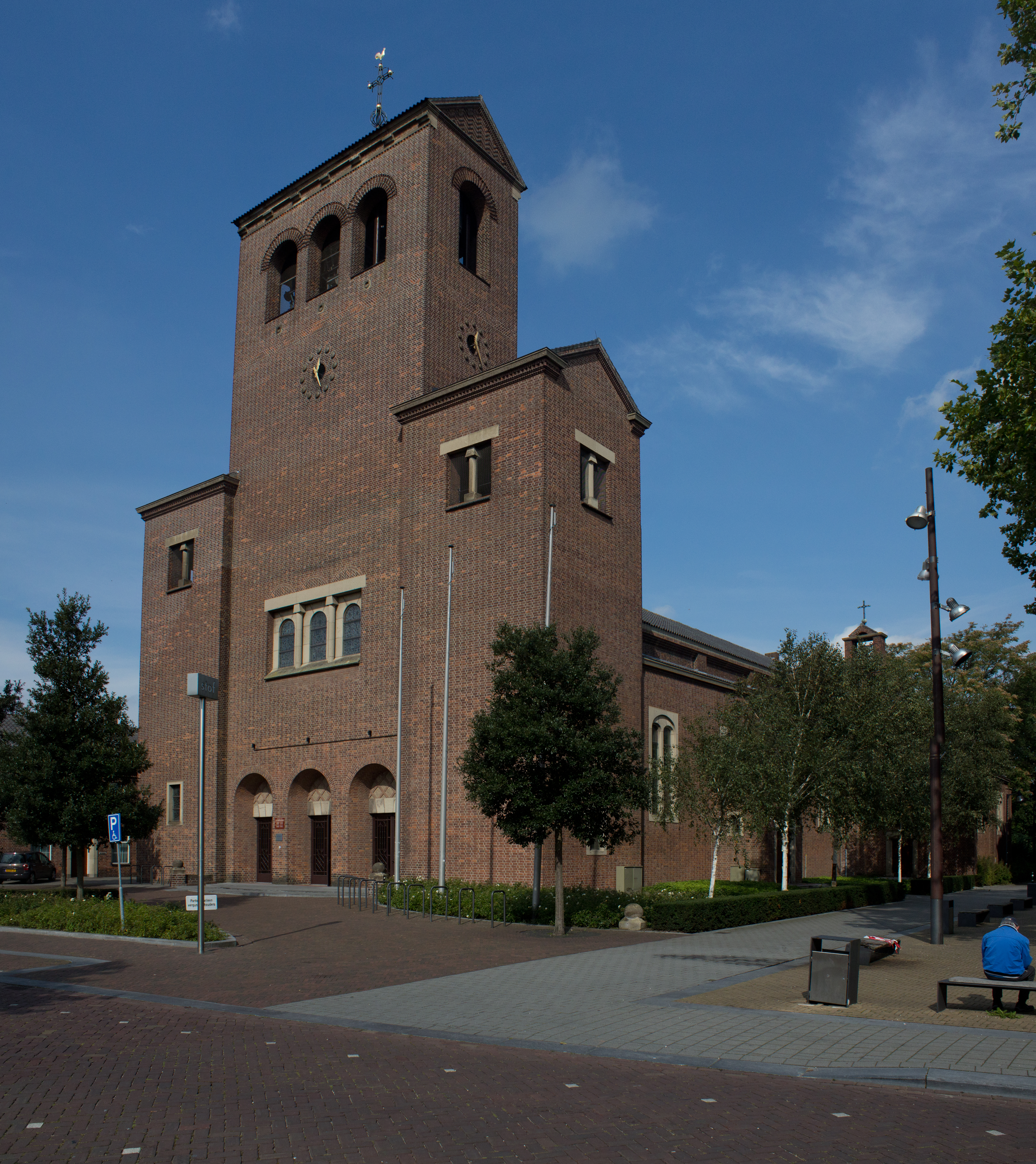
- Sint-Lambertuskerk (Drunen)

- Flag Coat of arms
- Interactive map of Drunen
- Coordinates: 51°41′9″N 5°7′59″E
- Country: Netherlands
- Province: North Brabant
- Municipality: Heusden

Population (1 January 2017)
  - Total: 18.216
- Postal code: 5150-5151-5152
- Area code: 0416
- Major roads: A59 N267

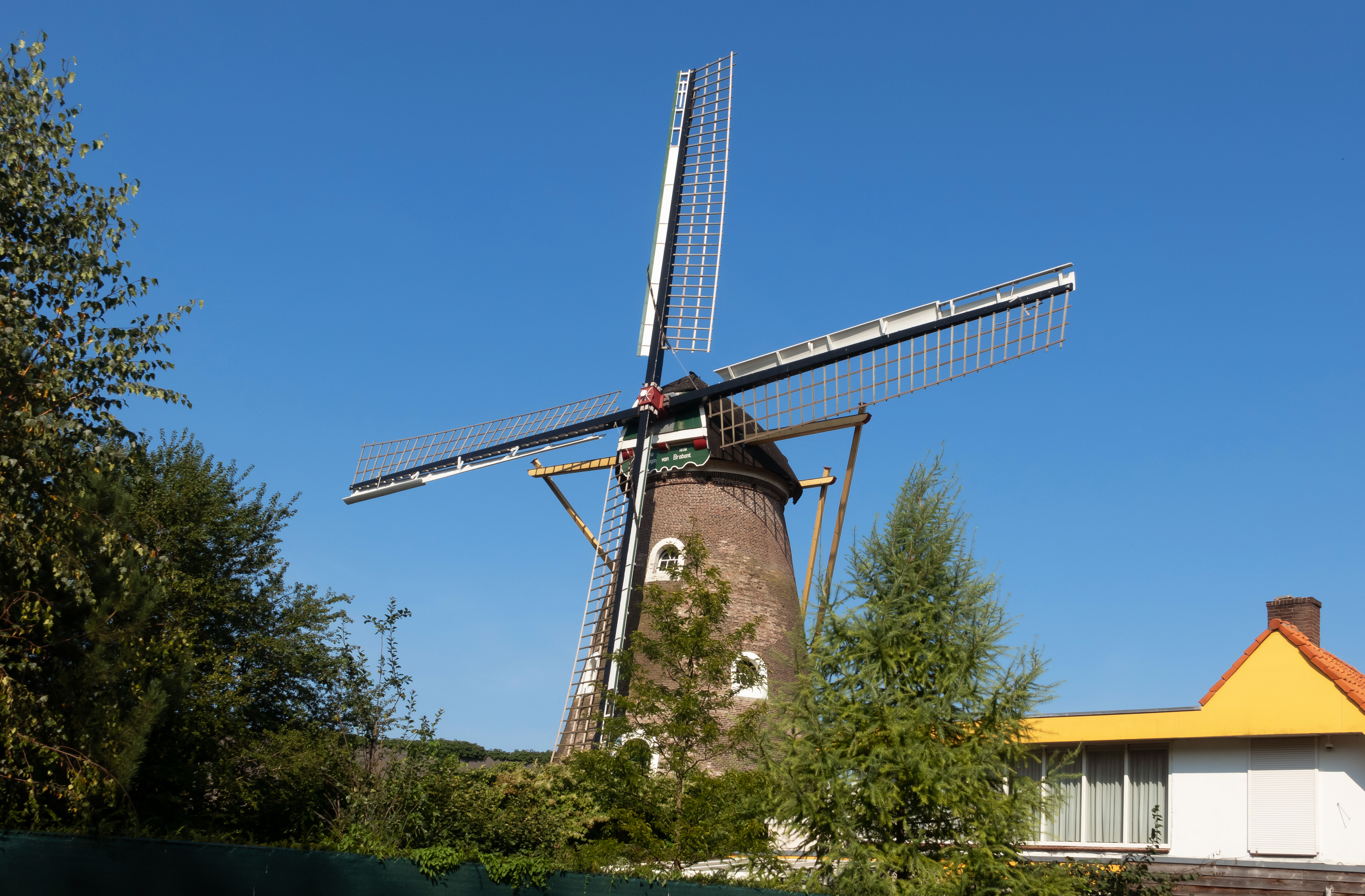
Windmill: Hertogin van Brabant

Drunen is a town in the municipality of Heusden in southern Netherlands. The town is part of a region called the Langstraat ('long road') which is historically known for its leather and shoe industry. Since 1813, Drunen had been a separate municipality, consisting of the towns Drunen, Elshout, and Giersbergen. As of 2017, Drunen's population is 18,216.

== Built environment ==
The center of Drunen is a plaza surrounded by the Sint-Lambertuskerk ('St Lambert's church') and city hall. A number of pubs, restaurants and stores are also located in the middle of town.

Drunen was heavily shelled by British Forces in late 1944 in the days prior to liberation from Nazi occupation and its main buildings were heavily damaged or destroyed outright. In consequence, there are few historic buildings. In 2007 the downtown area, including the plaza, was modernized.

== Municipal merger ==
On 1 January 1997, Drunen was incorporated, along with the municipalities of Heusden and Vlijmen, into the new, enlarged municipality of Heusden, containing the towns Drunen, Elshout, Giersbergen, Heesbeen, Doeveren, Hedikhuizen, Herpt, Oud-Heusden, Heusden, Vlijmen, Nieuwkuijk and Haarsteeg. Some argued that this enlarged municipality should have been called the municipality of Drunen, being the biggest of the three towns. However, due to the historical importance of Heusden, and possibly to avoid ill-will in the almost equally large town of Vlijmen, the municipality was named after Heusden.

== History ==
- 1813: Drunen becomes a municipality in the Kingdom of the Netherlands
- 1935: Elshout (previously part of the municipality Oud-Heusden) is added to Drunen
- 1944: Liberation of Drunen in World War II at which the church tower and many of the historic buildings are destroyed
- 1997: The municipality of Drunen is incorporated into the enlarged municipality of Heusden
- 2007: The modernized centre of Drunen is officially opened

== Economy ==
Drunen has an extensive industrial park which includes heavy industry for large ship's propellers, as well as copper and aluminium extrusion. Most recent industries focus on logistics. The biggest employers in Drunen are the propeller factory Wärtsilä (previously John Crane Group-LIPS) and the aluminium factory of the Sapa Group (previously Alcoa).

== Recreation ==
Drunen is internationally known for the Dutch: Loonse en Drunense Duinen National Park, ('Loon and Drunen Dunes'), consisting of dunes and forests that attracts many tourists. To emphasize the link between Drunen and the Dunes, at the opening of the modernized town center, a piece of art was unveiled which contains excerpts of a poem about the dunes.

An historic car and vehicle museum ("Autotron") was located in Drunen until 1987. The building was designed by architect Anton Pieck (known from the Efteling). It is currently used as a theatre and arts facility, highlighting different music, dance and art groups. In 1987, the Autotron collection moved to Rosmalen until 2003, since when it has become part of the Louwman Museum's collection in The Hague.

A theme park called Land van Ooit was located in Drunen as well. However, on 22 November 2007 the park closed. Subsequently, the property of 44 acres (180,000 m^{2}) was purchased by the local government for recreational purposes and to support infrastructure.

== Notable people ==
- Jay Hardway (Jobke Heiblom), DJ/Producer and drummer.
- Jolijn van de Wiel, child actress
- Michiel van der Heijden, mountainbiker and cyclo cross rider
- Paul van Loon, author
- Mike Williams (DJ), future house, future bounce producer and dj
- Zanger Kafke, Folk Singer

== See also ==
- Draaiorgel de Vijf Beelden — Dutch street organ of the Five Figures, previously exhibited at Autotron in Drunen, until its closing.
