= Bioscope show =

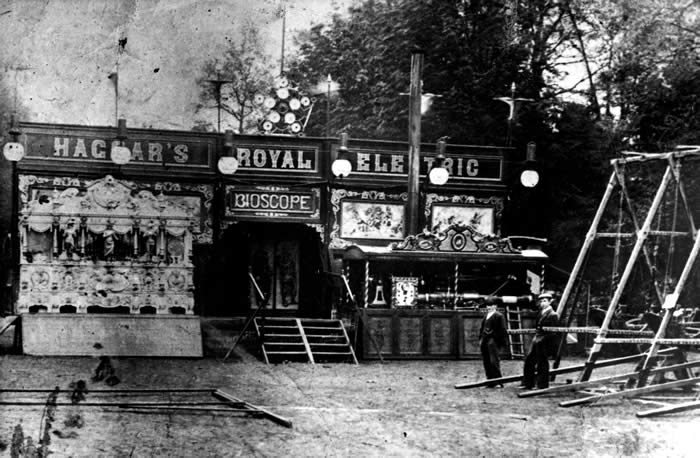
William Haggar's travelling Bioscope from 1902

A Bioscope show was a music hall and fairground attraction consisting of a travelling cinema. The heyday of the Bioscope was from the late 1890s until World War I.

== History ==
Bioscope shows were fronted by the largest fairground organs, and these formed the entire public face of the show. A stage was usually in front of the organ, and dancing girls would entertain the crowds between film shows.

Films shown in the Bioscope were primitive, and the earliest of these were made by the showmen themselves. Later, films were commercially produced.

Bioscope shows were integrated, in Britain at least, into the Variety shows in the huge Music Halls which were built at the end of the nineteenth century.

After the Music Hall Strike of 1907 in London, bioscope operators set up a trade union to represent them. There were about seventy operators in London at this point.

== Modern use ==
In South Africa "Bioscope" or in Afrikaans "bioskoop" is an archaic word for the cinema and some people (especially older generations) still use it regularly. Bioscopes and biocafes which served food and drink as you watched the film, dating back to the 1940s and 1950s closed in the 1970s, mostly due to the arrival of television in South Africa in 1976 which caused cinema attendances to severely drop.

In modern-day Dutch, "bioscoop" is a widespread term, and the equivalent of the English "movie theater" or "cinema".

In Serbian language, "bioskop" is a modern term for movie theater.

In the modern-day Indonesian Language, "bioskop" is a modern term for movie theater adopted from the Dutch during the colonial era.
