= Gavioli =

Franco–Italian instrument manufacturer

Gavioli & Cie was a Franco–Italian organ builder company that manufactured fairground organs in both Italy and later France.

== History ==
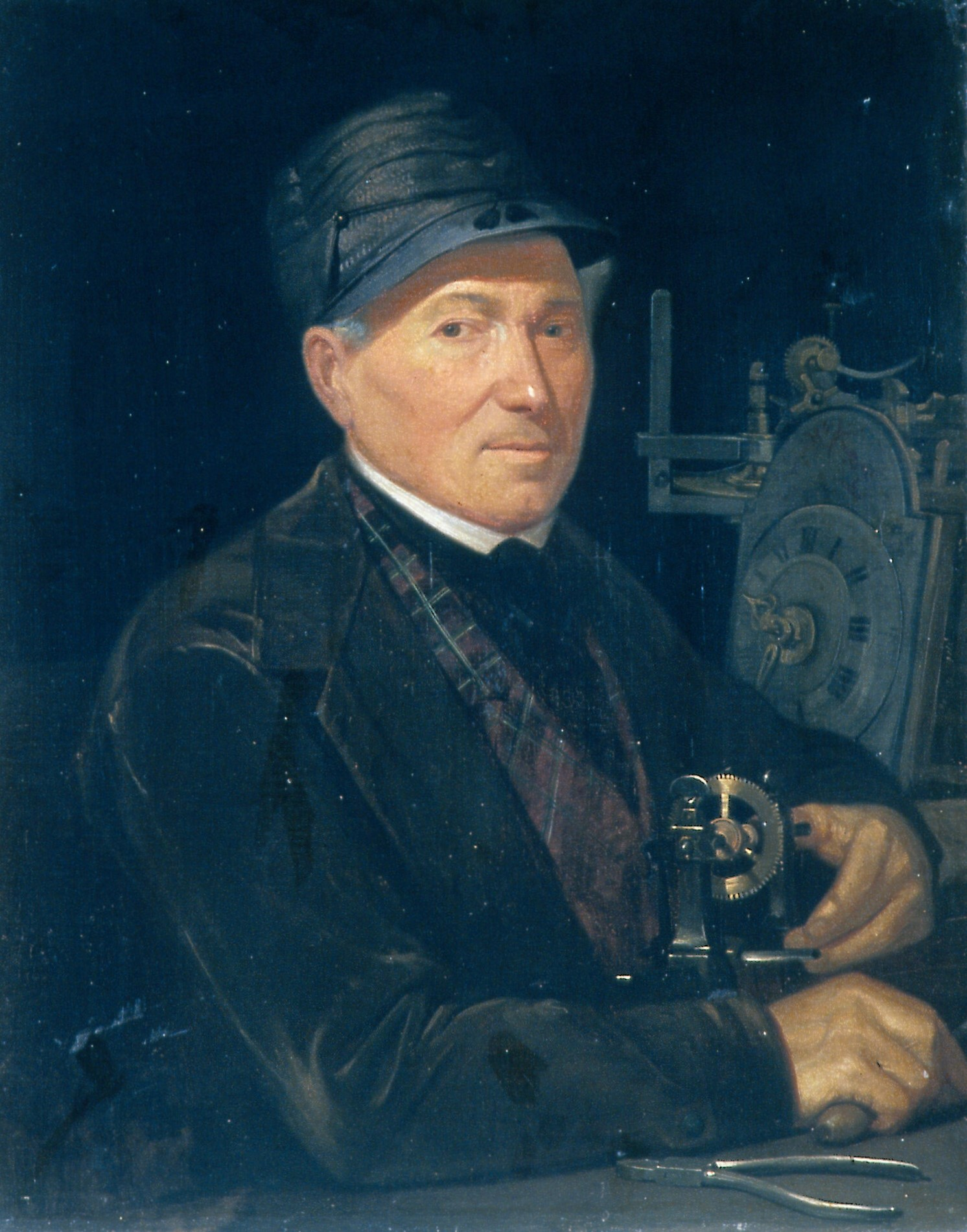
Geminiano Mundici, Portrait of Giacomo Gavioli

Gavioli was founded in 1806 in Cavezzo, Italy, by Giacomo Gavioli (1786–1875). Giacomo's hobby was the development of automatic playing musical instruments like bird organs and flute clocks. In 1818, he moved to Modena, where he repaired carillons and tower clocks. His son Lodovico Gavioli (1807–1875) was a very clever inventor; he built a large orchestrion organ, the Panharmonico, for the Duke of Modena, who refused to buy the instrument. Ludovico then took it to London and Paris. Additionally, he designed and build the Modena's Palazzo comunale, the city hall. In 1845 Ludovico moved the business to the trade capital of the organ trade, Paris, France. From 1858 on he started his own organ building company in the Rue d'Aligre. Ludovico had three sons: Anselme, Henry and Claude.

Each contributed to the business, but it is Anselme Gavioli (1828-1902) whose name is remembered. In 1878 he invented the frein, a piece of metal that allowed pipes to produce a sound similar to a cello or violin. In 1892 he patented the use of book music to play organs. Up until this point, pipe organs were played by a large wooden cylinder, using a system akin to the modern musical box. This limited the length of music which could be played to the size of the cylinder. Another inconvenience of cylinders was their size, which limited the number of tunes that could be played. Book music uses a series of zig-zag folded sheets of cardboard in a folded book, which allowed mechanical arms to "feel" the holes and hence open the valves to allow compressed air to play the pipes of the organ. The development marked a turning point in the history of the mechanical organ, by allowing music to be almost infinitely long, and allowed Gavioli to become the most famous and prolific of fair organ builders. The Gavioli family had branches in cities such as London, Manchester, New York City and Waldkirch.

After Anselmo's death in 1902 the business passed to Anselme's son Ludivico II. Then the business took a series of tragic circumstances. Gavioli ceased making organs in 1912, and the remainder of the business was transferred to Limonaire Frères of Paris. Afterwards, a number of their engineers went on to build their own organ companies, including Carl Frei.

The Steam Carousel in the Efteling theme park in the Netherlands features one of the many surviving Gavioli organs. Many Gavioli organs still exist, mainly in the UK, but there are also organs in the U.S. and in Japan. The Gavioli organ from Euclid Beach Park in Cleveland, Ohio still survives and is being restored.

== Gallery ==
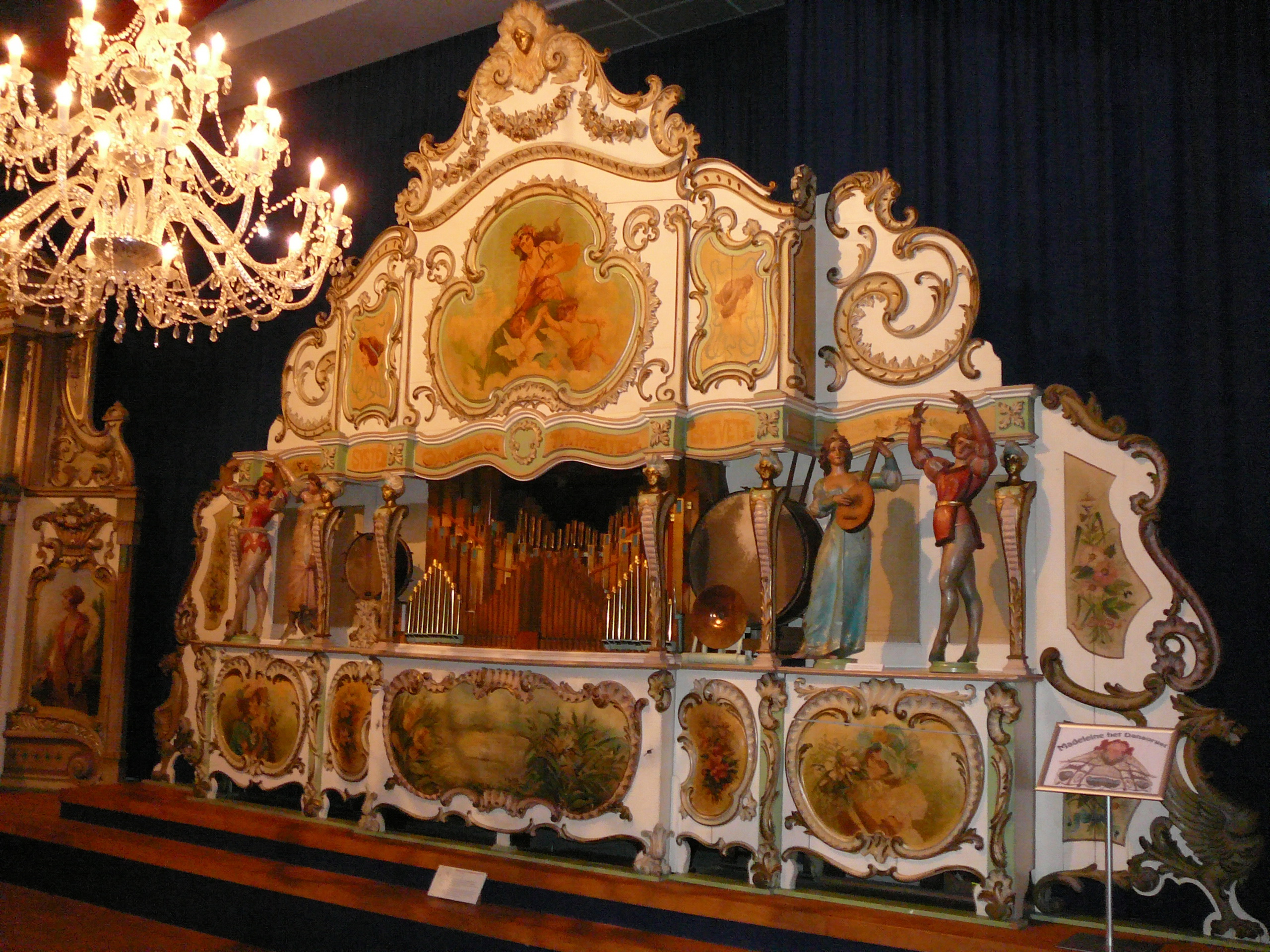
A 65-key Gavioli dance organ in the Museum Speelklok in Utrecht

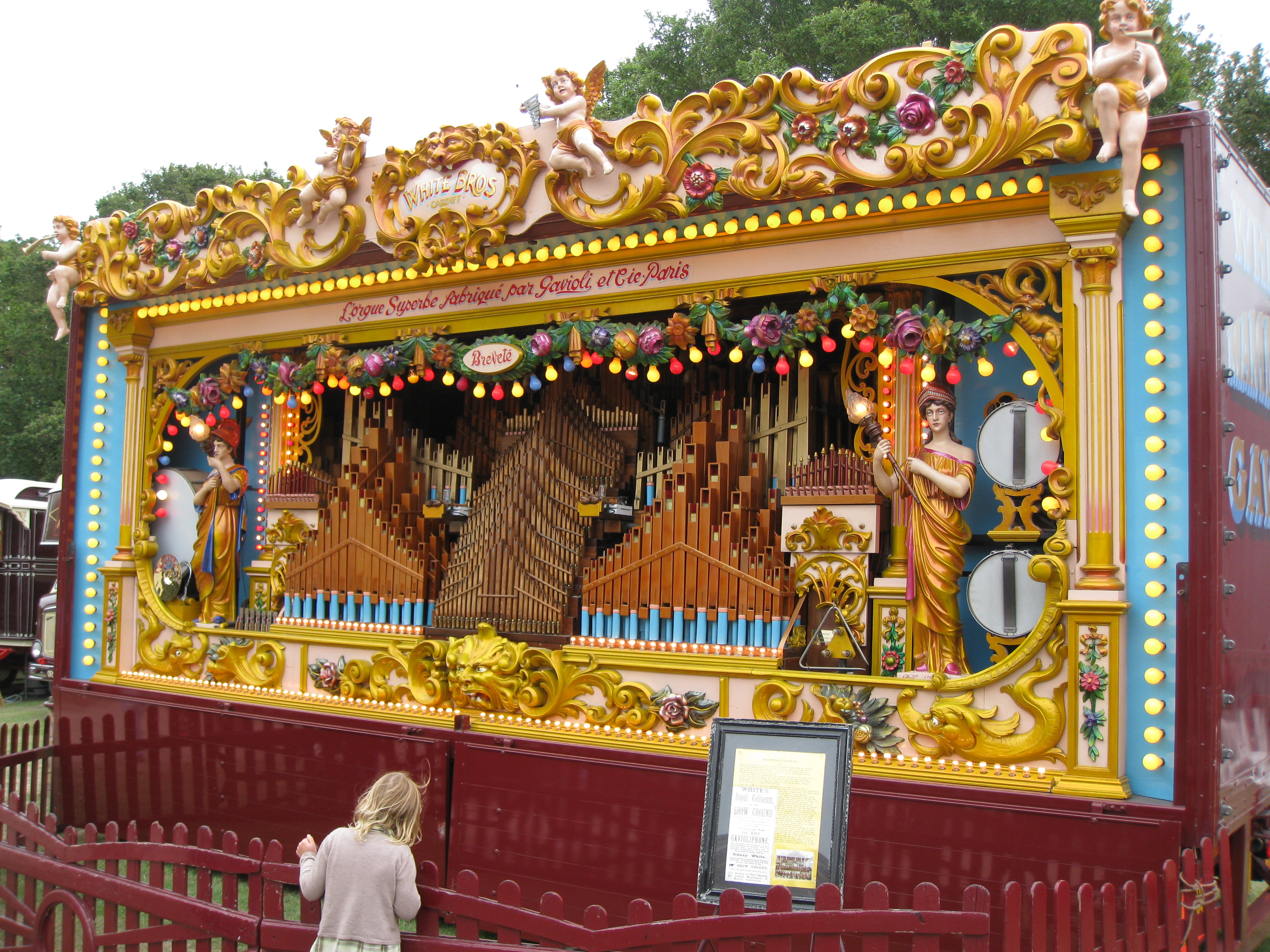
White's Mammoth Gavioli Organ, an historic organ originally from Barry Island Pleasure Park, Wales

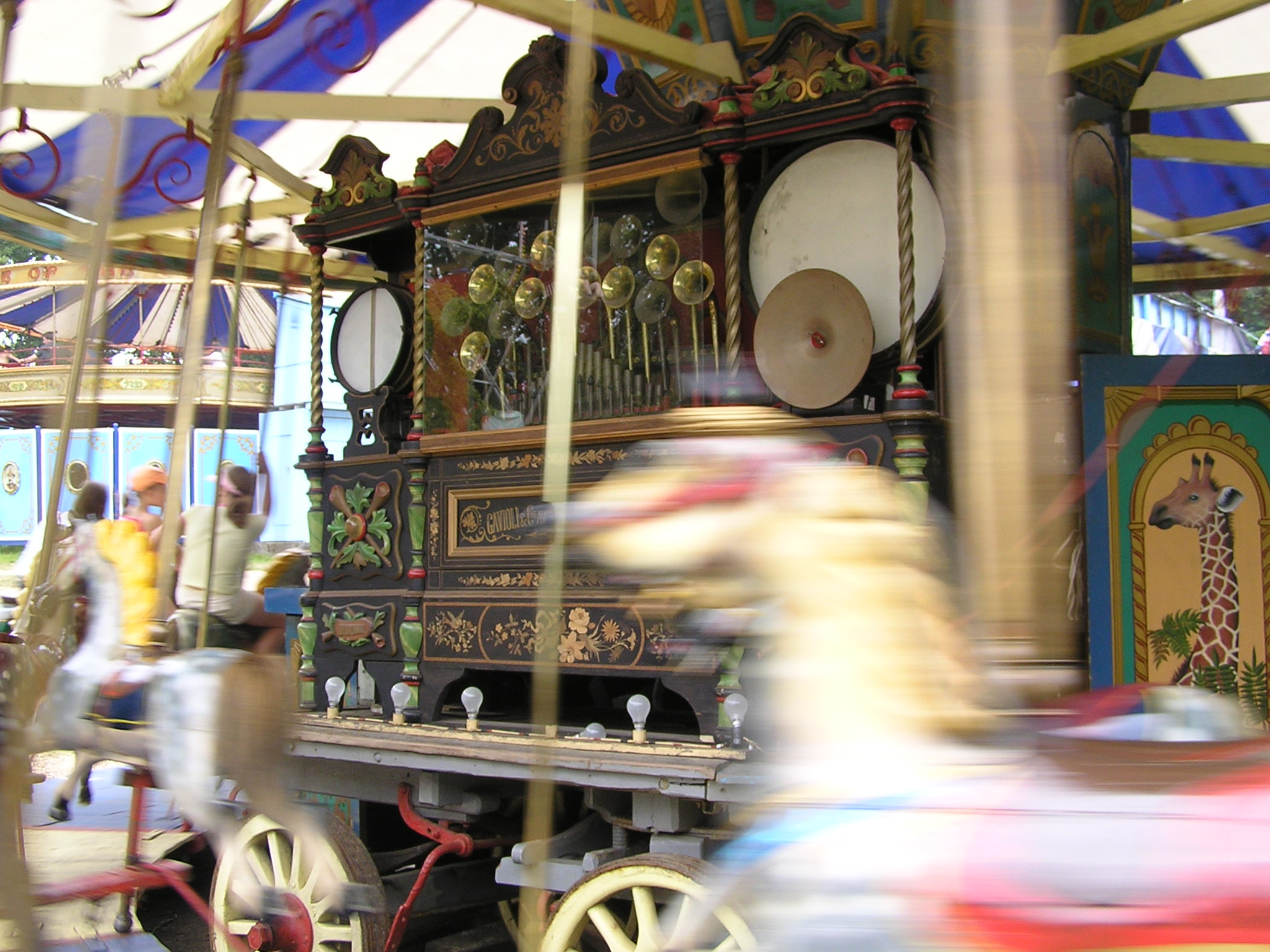
An earlier style of organ, playing from a pinned barrel.

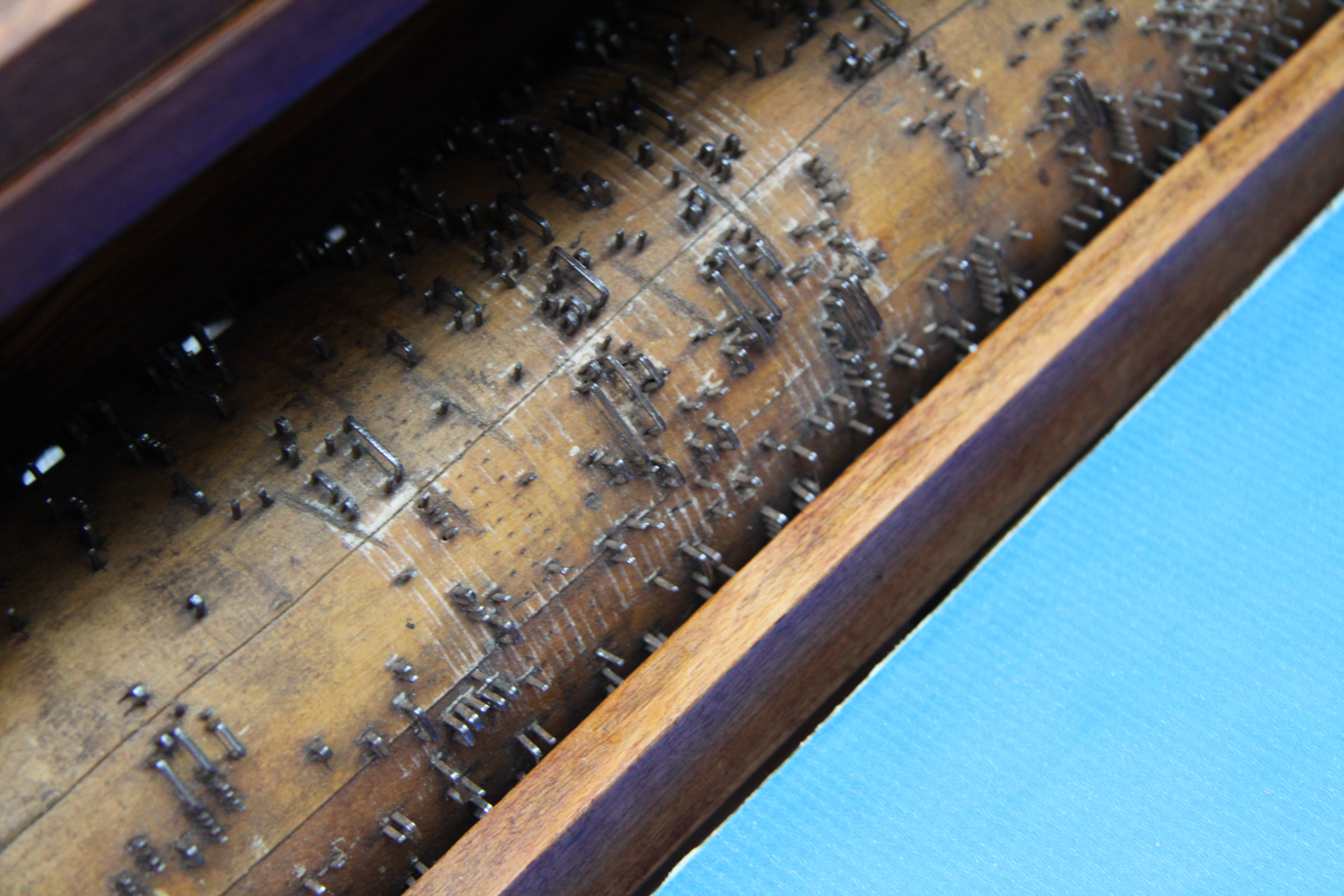
An example of a pinned barrel

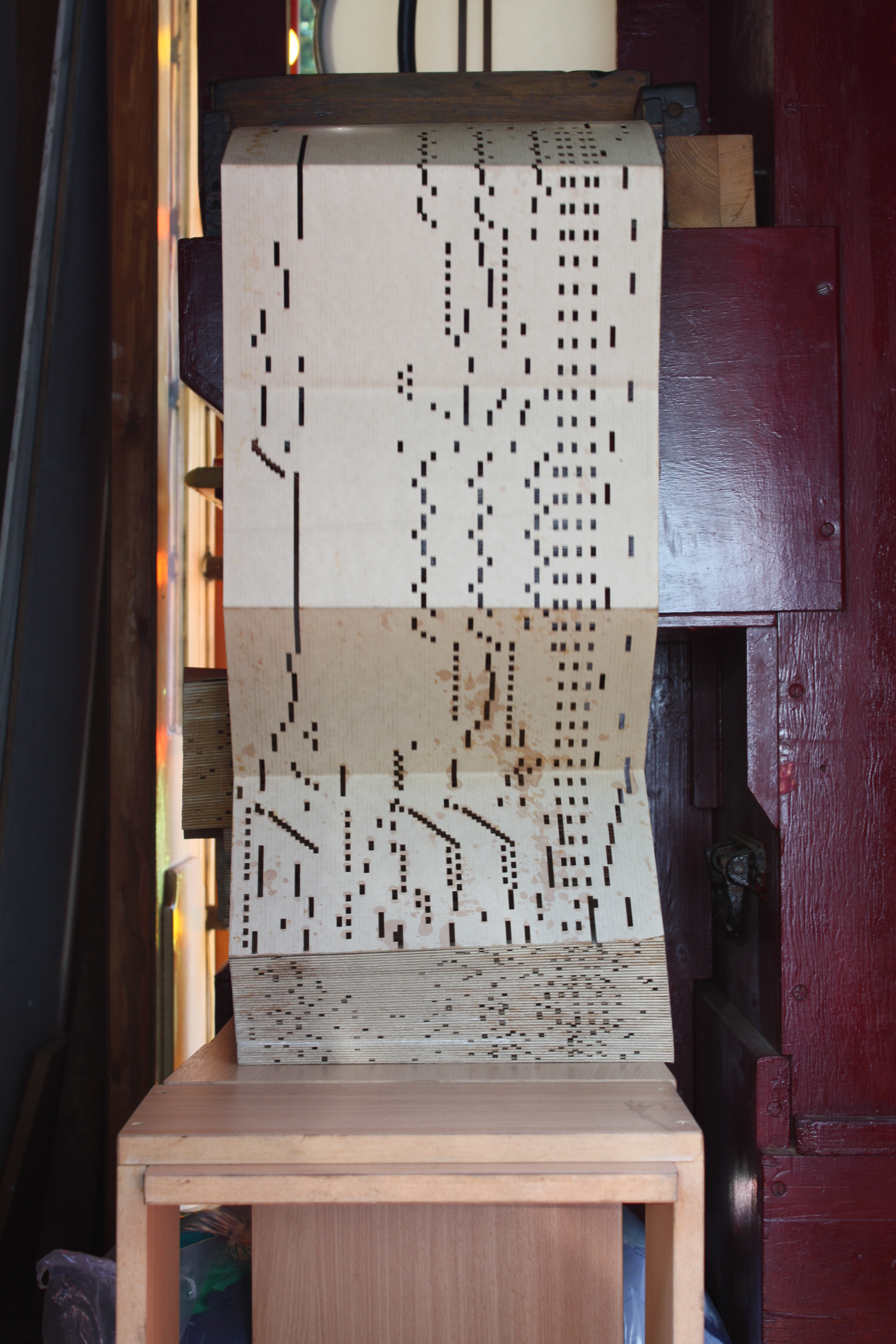
Book music and reader from a Gavioli organ
