= Sound Leisure =

Design and manufacturing company

Sound Leisure Ltd (SL) is a design and manufacturing company based in Leeds, United Kingdom. The company has several divisions and product ranges but is known most commonly for their production of jukeboxes.

Originally formed by Alan Black and Edward Moss in 1978, the company which is now run by Christopher and Michael Black employs around 110 staff. Sound Leisure specializes in the design and manufacture of commercial digital jukeboxes for the leisure and retail sector and classic reproductions jukeboxes for the domestic market. The company considers itself the oldest 'self-owned' jukebox company in the world, having been controlled by the Black family for almost 40 years.

== Classic jukeboxes ==
Sound Leisure's Classic Jukeboxes division produce hand made classic jukeboxes based on the classic 1940s and 50s American manufacturers Wurlitzer, Rowe-Ami and Seeburg. Sound Leisure remain the only company in the world to produce a "one-piece" wooden cabinet reflecting the original construction methods.

SL's reproductions were originally designed as commercial boxes, playing vinyl 45 records. Both SL's Mk1 and Mk2 vinyl changer mechanisms each facilitated 70 or 100 selections respectively, with the major difference between the two solutions being the drive method for the turntable (MK1 belt driver, MK2 direct drive.) Many of these products remain in operation today, and the company still services and refurbishes them at its Leeds-based manufacturing facility.

At the start of the 1980s, Sound Leisure released the '21st Century’ 80 disc CD changing mechanism, production of which ran in parallel to the Mk2 vinyl mechanism for several years. The success of the 21st Century mechanism enabled the company to develop from a small UK manufacturer to a global supplier, such was the effectiveness and reliability of the CD product. Sound Leisure continue to produce CD Classic Jukeboxes featuring the 21st Century Mechanism to this day, with a distribution network providing sales and product support for their Classic Jukeboxes globally.

In April 2016 Sound Leisure announced the reintroduction of a vinyl mechanism option to their Classic Jukeboxes product line. Released in the summer of 2016, this made them the only company in the world producing a vinyl jukebox. The new vinyl mechanism would be a substantially upgraded version of the MK2 solution incorporating many technological advances and feature improvements made possible by the advances in technology and electronics in the 20 year window since the original MK2 ceased production. In order to develop the mechanism, the company reformed the original MK1/2 development team (Alan Black, Phil Patterson and Dave Boardman) who collaborated with Sound Leisure's current engineers and designers to develop the solution. The Vinyl Rocket jukebox prototype was displayed at the Classic Car Show in the UK in April 2016 and resulted in extensive media exposure for SL and pre-orders for the vinyl box.

December 2016 saw the official release of the Vinyl Rocket, a 140-selection mechanism playing 7" 45 rpm records. This was the first vinyl playing jukebox to be manufactured by the company in over 25 years and the only manufacturer to currently sell a vinyl jukebox anywhere in the world.

All SL's Classic Jukeboxes are still produced as commercial grade products, suitable for use in retail and leisure sectors. The division has produced branded versions of its products for companies such as Doc Martens, Sailor Jerry, Jack Daniels and US brand Crosley.

== Digital jukeboxes ==
Sound Leisure claims to be the first company to create and patent a digital jukebox. In 1988 the company demonstrated the world's first commercial digital jukebox. The product, named Nimbus, was initially demonstrated to a group of senior trade executives and press at the Cedar Court Hotel in Wakefield and then to an audience at the Novotel previews at Hammersmith in October 1988.
