= Jukebox =

Device to play music

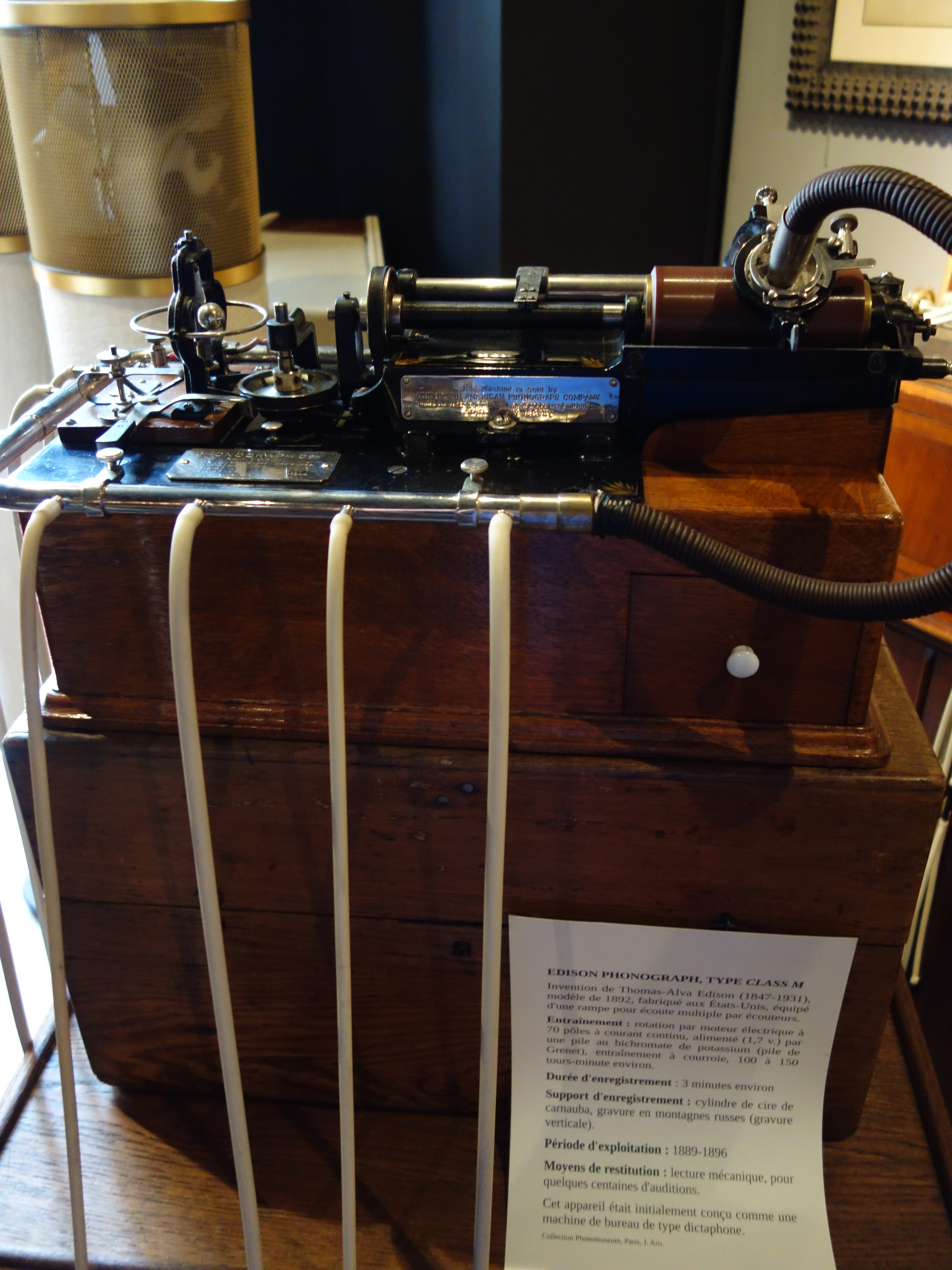
Edison Class M Cylinder Phonograph (1892)

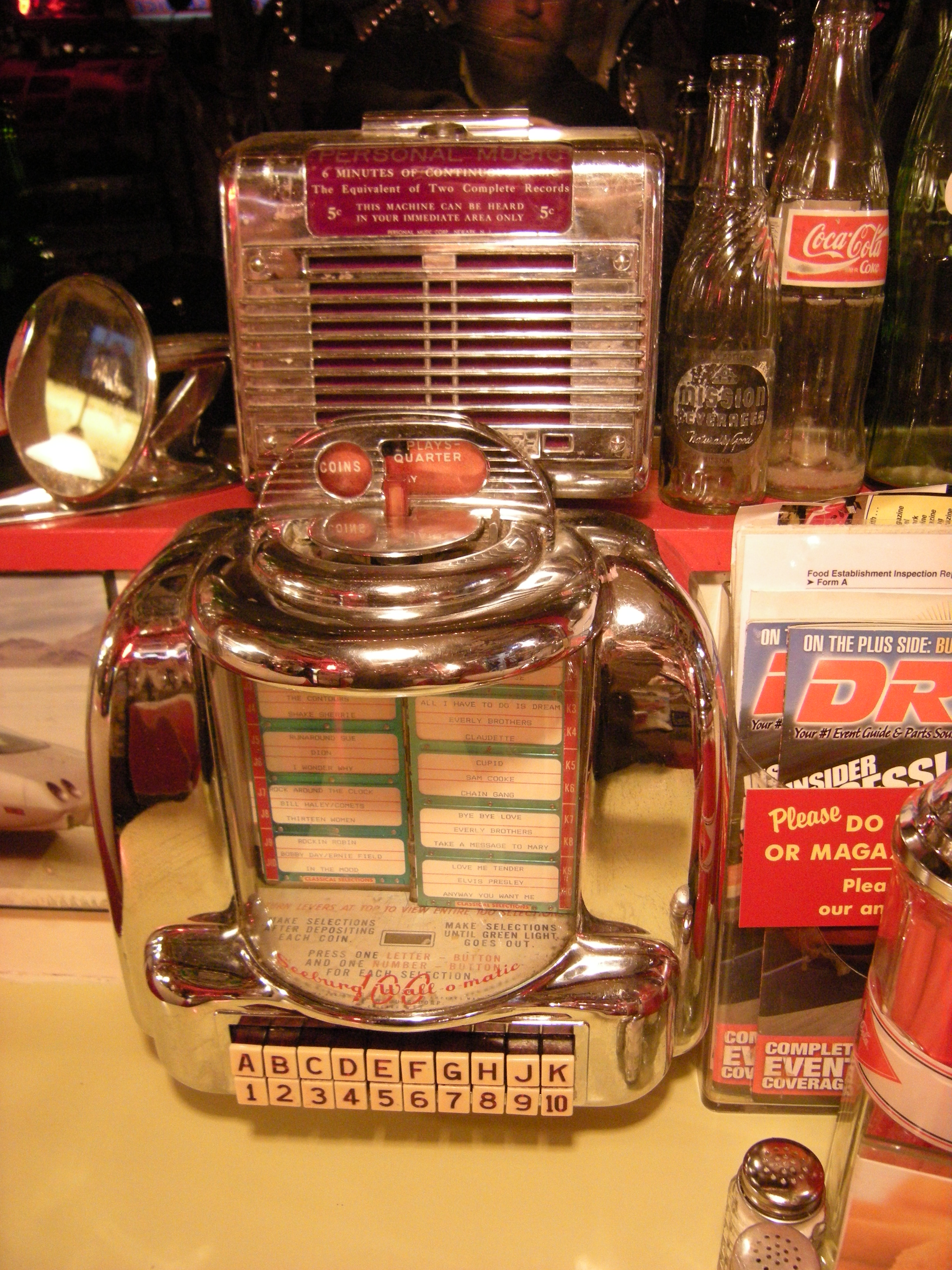
Seeburg Wall-o-Matic remote selector

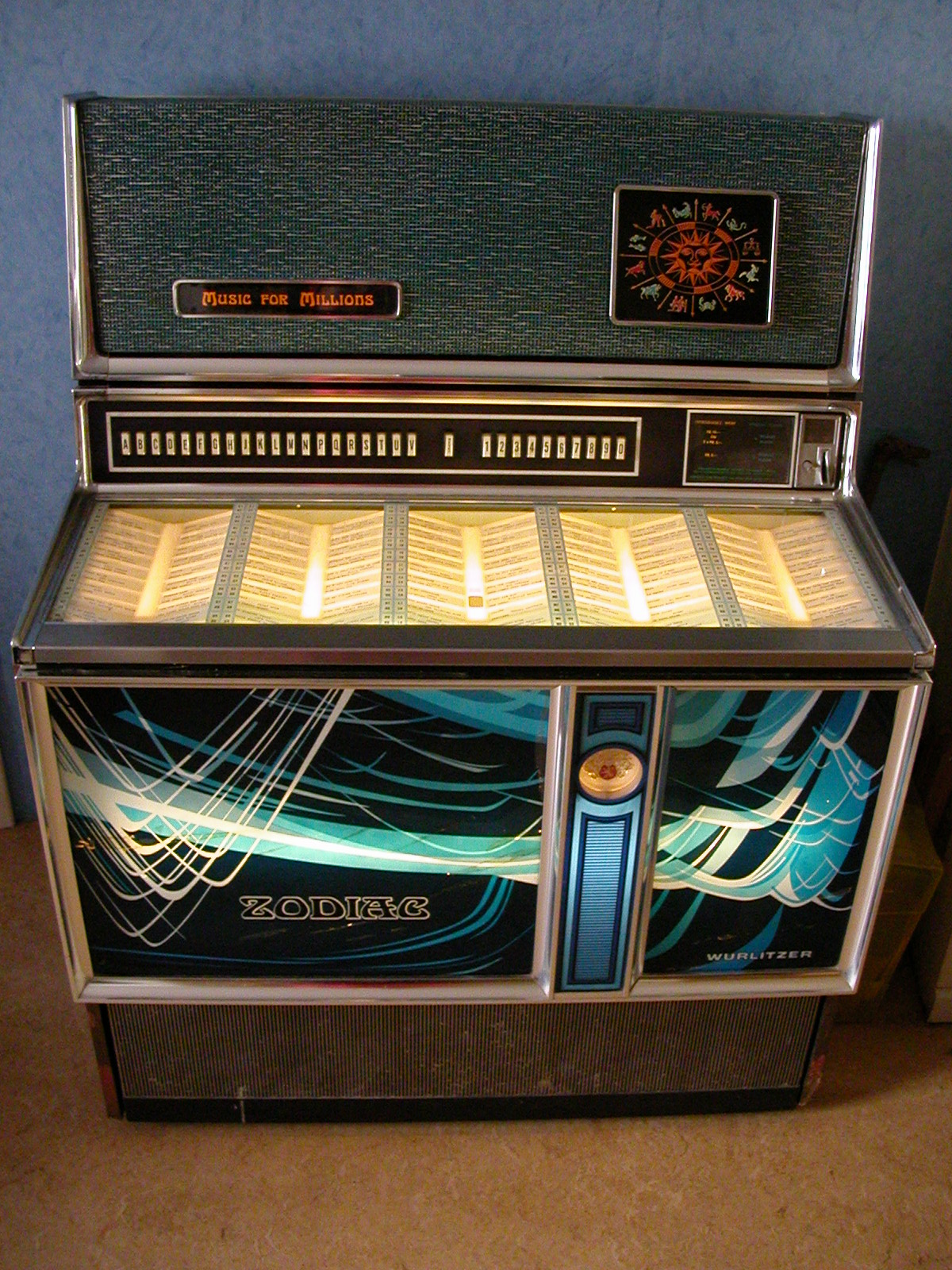
Wurlitzer Zodiac 3500 jukebox (1971)

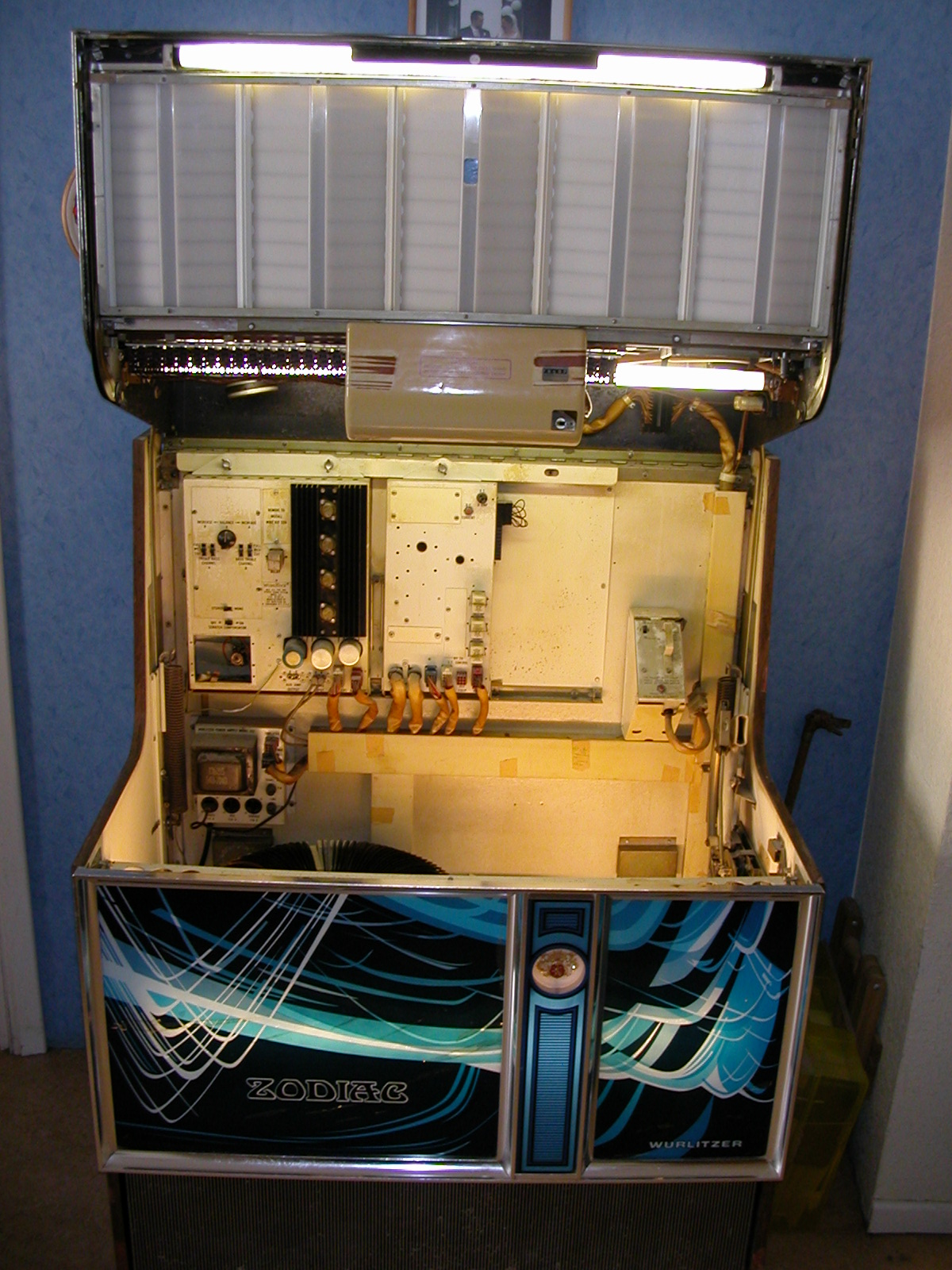
Wurlitzer jukebox opened

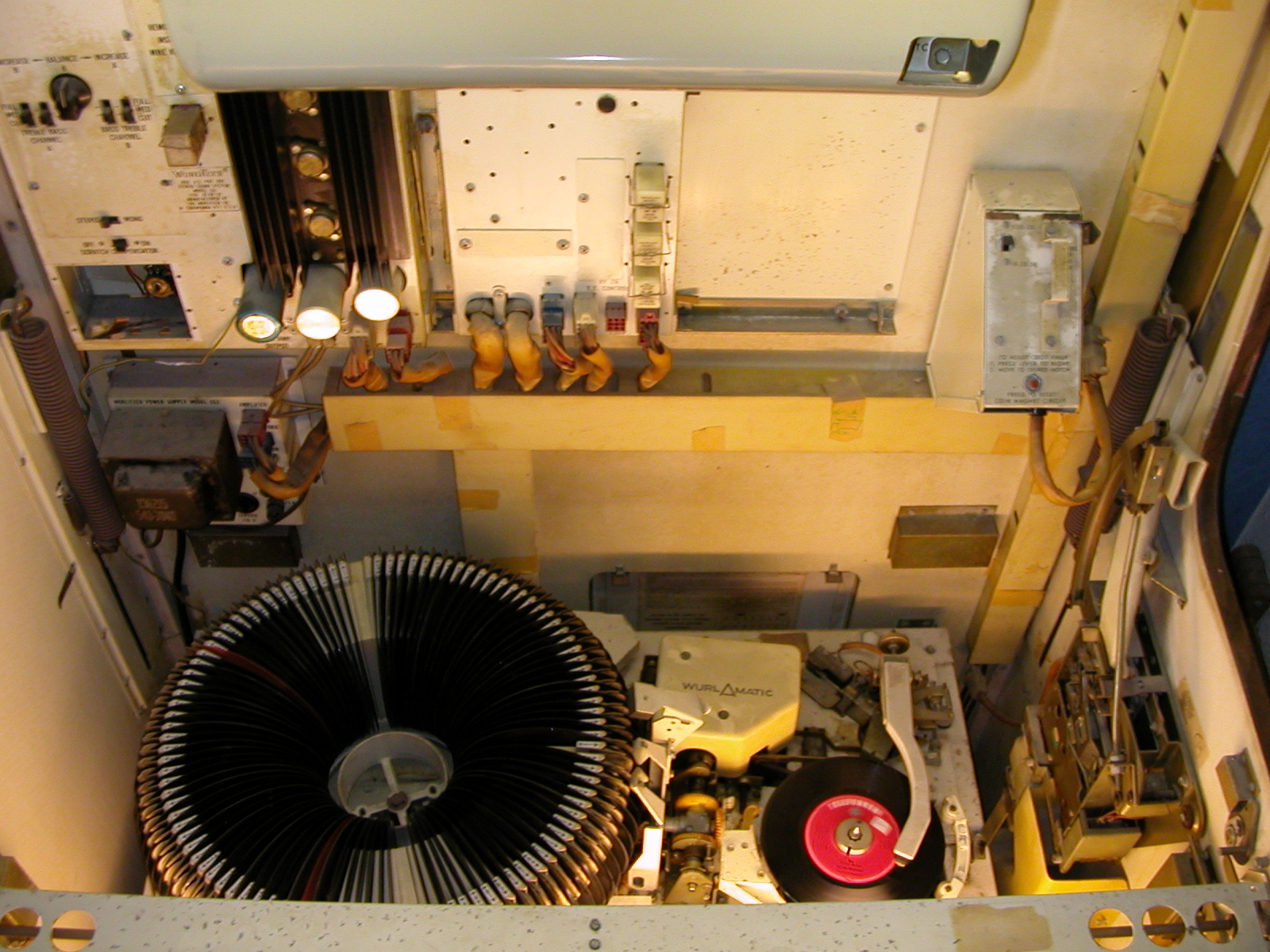
Wurlitzer jukebox internal mechanism

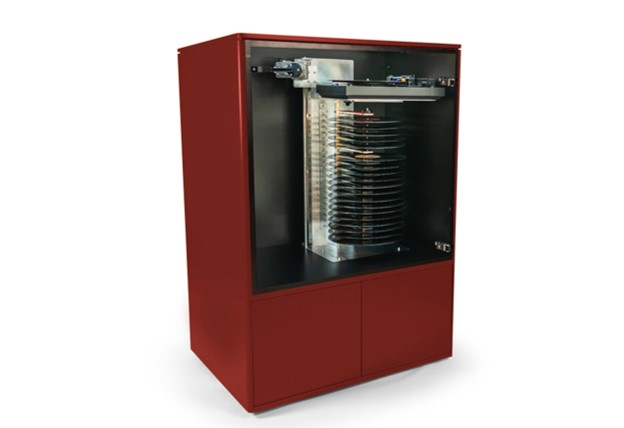
2018 Orphéau “Sunflower” Jukebox for 12″ records

A jukebox is a partially automated music-playing device, usually a coin-operated machine, that plays a user-selected song from a self-contained media library. Traditional jukeboxes contain records, compact discs, or digital files, and allow users to select songs through mechanical buttons, a touch screen, or keypads. They were most commonly found in diners, bars, and entertainment venues throughout the 20th century.

The modern concept of the jukebox evolved from earlier automatic phonographs of the late 19th century. The first coin-operated phonograph was introduced by Louis Glass and William S. Arnold in 1889 at the Palais Royale Saloon in San Francisco. The term “jukebox” came into use in the United States beginning in 1940, referring to “juke joints”, itself derived from the Gullah word juke, which means “bawdy”. Manufacturers of jukeboxes tried to avoid using the term, associated with unreputable places, for many years.

Jukeboxes became especially popular from the 1940s to the 1960s, with models produced by companies such as Wurlitzer, Seeburg, Rock-Ola, and AMI. In the digital age, traditional jukeboxes have been largely replaced by internet-enabled systems and digital streaming services, though vintage and retro-style jukeboxes remain popular in niche markets and among collectors.

== History ==
Coin-operated music boxes and player pianos were the first forms of automated coin-operated musical devices. These devices used paper rolls, metal disks, or metal cylinders to play a musical selection on an actual instrument, or on several actual instruments, enclosed within the device. Later machines used sound recordings instead of musical instruments.

In 1889, Louis Glass and William S. Arnold invented the nickel-in-the-slot phonograph, in San Francisco, installing it at the Palais Royal Saloon, 303 Sutter street, two blocks away from the offices of their Pacific Phonograph Company. This was an Edison Class M Electric Phonograph retrofitted with a device patented under the name of ‘Coin Actuated Attachment for Phonograph’. The music was heard via two of eight listening tubes.

In 1928, Justus P. Seeburg, who was manufacturing player pianos, combined a loudspeaker with a record player that was coin-operated. This ‘Audiophone’ machine was wide and bulky because it had eight separate turntables mounted on a rotating Ferris wheel-like device, allowing patrons to select from eight different 10-inch 78 rpm records.

Also in 1928, Homer E. Capehart and some backers founded the Capehart Automatic Phonograph Company, which brought out the Orchestrope. It was a device in which the tone arm slipped between each pair of records in a vertical stack, playing that record on which the needle fell.

A similar system to Seeburg’s Audiophone was employed by the Mills Novelty Company in their 1935 Dancemaster Automatic Phonograph. The Seeburg Symphonola jukebox of 1938 holds 20 10-inch 78 rpm records each in a shallow centreless drawer so that when the selected record’s drawer opens, the turntable can rise through the open centre of the drawer to lift the record up to meet the pickup arm at the top of the mechanism, where it plays. Working examples of both these instruments may be seen and heard at the Musical Museum, Brentford, England.

Later versions of the jukebox included Seeburg’s Selectophone with 10 turntables mounted vertically on a spindle. By maneuvering the tone arm up and down, the customer could select from 10 different records.

Wallboxes were an important, and profitable, part of any jukebox installation. Serving as a remote control, they enabled patrons to select tunes from their table or booth. One example is the Seeburg 3W1, introduced in 1949 as companion to the 100-selection Model M100A jukebox. Stereo sound became popular in the early 1960s, and wallboxes of the era were designed with built-in speakers to provide patrons a sample of this latest technology.

Jukeboxes were most popular from the 1940s through the mid-1960s, particularly during the 1950s. By the middle of the 1940s, three-quarters of the records produced in America went into jukeboxes. Billboard published a record chart measuring jukebox play during the 1950s, which briefly became a component of the Hot 100; by 1959, the jukebox’s popularity had waned to the point where Billboard ceased publishing the chart and stopped collecting jukebox play data. Jukeboxes were popular in Japan throughout the 1960s and 1970s.

As of 2016, at least two companies still manufacture classically styled jukeboxes: Rock-Ola, based in California, and Sound Leisure, based in Leeds in the UK. Both companies manufacture jukeboxes based on a CD playing mechanism. However, in April 2016, Sound Leisure showed a prototype of a “Vinyl Rocket” at the UK Classic Car Show. It stated that it would start production of the 140 7-inch vinyl selector (70 records) in summer of the same year.

Since 2018, Orphéau, based in Brittany in France manufactures the original styled “Sunflower” Jukebox with the first 12″ vinyl record selector (20 records), on both sides.

== Notable models ==
- 1927 LINK – Valued at US$40,000 and extremely rare
- 1940 Gabel Kuro – 78 rpm, the manufacturer’s last model. Four or five are known to exist; valued at US$125,000
- 1942 Rock-Ola President – Only one is known to exist; valued at least US$150,000
- 1942 Rock-Ola Premier – 15 known to exist; valued at US$20,000
- 1942 Wurlitzer 950 – 75–90 known to exist; valued at US$35,000
- 1946 Wurlitzer Model 1015 – Also known as the “bubbler”, it offered 24 selections. More than 56,000 were sold in less than two years. Considered a pop culture icon, it was designed by Paul Fuller.
- 1952 Seeburg M100C – The jukebox exterior used in the credit sequences for Happy Days in seasons 1–10. It played up to fifty 45-RPM records, making it a 100-play. It was very colorful, with chrome glass tubes on the front, mirrors in the display, and rotating animation in the pilasters.
- 1967 Rock-Ola 434 Concerto – The jukebox interior used in the credit sequence for the 11th and final season of Happy Days. Like the Seeburg M100C, it played up to fifty 45-RPM records, but unlike the M100C, had a horizontal playback mechanism.
- 2018 Orphéau Sunflower Series – The first jukebox that played up to twenty 33-RPM records on both sides.

== Impact ==
Traditional jukeboxes once were an important source of income for record publishers. Jukeboxes received the newest recordings first. They became an important market-testing device for new music, since they tallied the number of plays for each title. They let listeners control the music outside of their home, before audio technology became portable. They played music on demand without commercials.

In 1995, the United States Postal Service issued a 25-cent stamp commemorating the jukebox.

== Derivatives ==
=== Disc changers ===
Disc changers are similar devices for personal use. Record changers on turntables typically lacked any selection mechanism, instead playing an entire stack of up to a dozen records in order. CD changers identical in size to standard players or inside a single-DIN car stereo hold several discs; slightly larger changers that fit on a shelf or in a car’s trunk attached to its vehicle audio system controlled from the dashboard, hold up to hundreds of discs; these can be arbitrarily autoplayed, removed, or inserted by the user. If under software control, especially for computer file storage, these are often called optical jukeboxes.

=== Portable music players ===
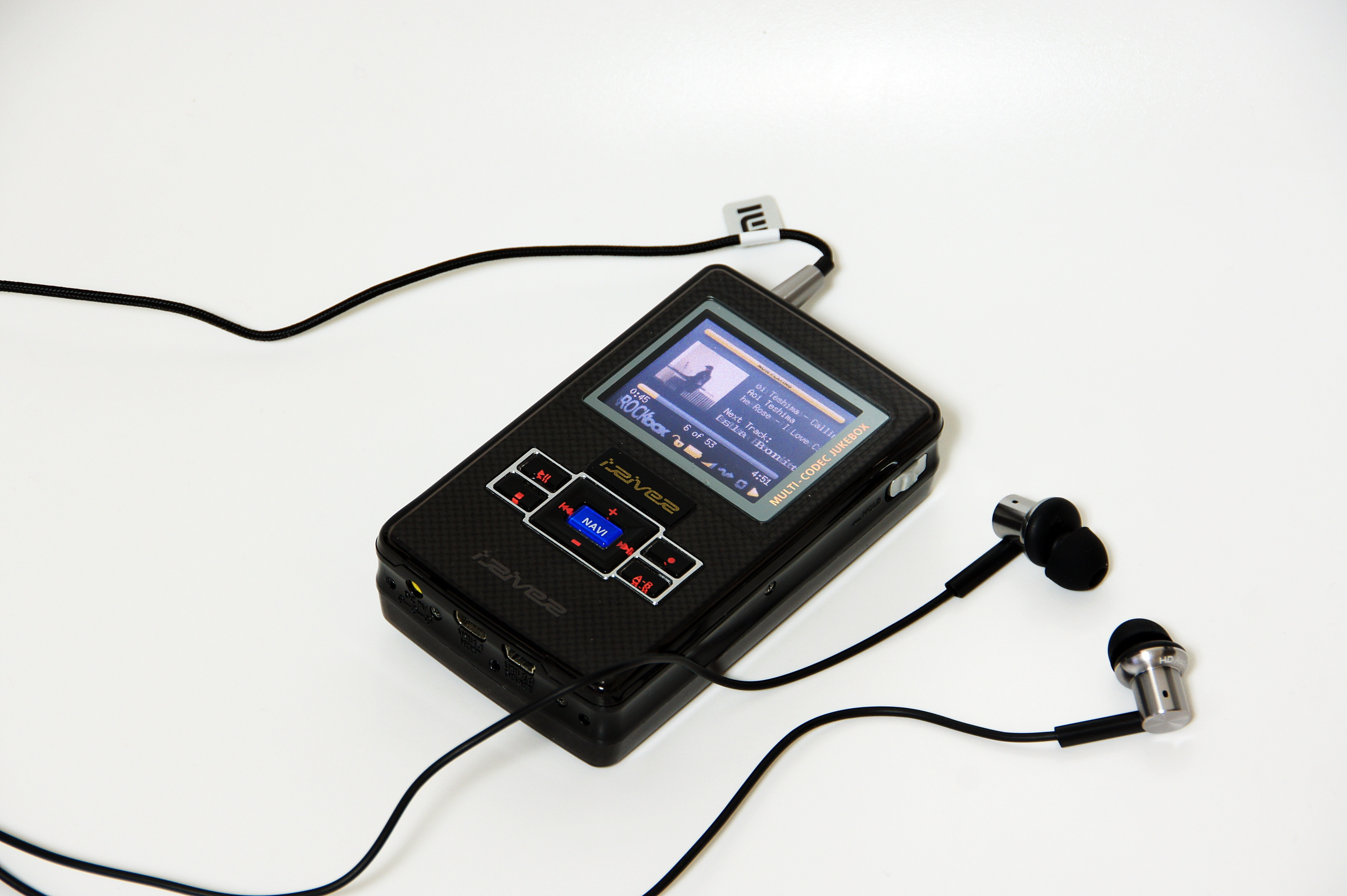
iRiver H300, a type of player that was described as a “jukebox”

The term “jukebox” was used to describe high-capacity, hard disk mobile digital audio players due to their amount of digital space allowing someone’s entire personal music library to be stored and played anywhere. The term was popularized following the introduction of the Creative NOMAD Jukebox in 2000, which could store the MP3 compressed equivalent of 150 CDs of music on its six gigabyte hard drive. In later years, the “classic” iPod would become the most iconic product in this category.

=== Digital jukebox and apps ===
While the number of vinyl-based jukeboxes declined, digital jukeboxes, also called the “social jukebox”, have been introduced in bars and clubs. Touchtunes is an example of a company that specializes in digital jukeboxes.

== See also ==
- BAL-AMi Jukeboxes
- Boombox
- Music box
- Player piano
- Rock-Ola
- Seeburg 1000
- Sound Leisure
- Vending machine
- Arcade game
- Juke Box Jury
