= Wurlitzer =

U.S. musical instrument and jukebox manufacturer

Rudolph Wurlitzer Company
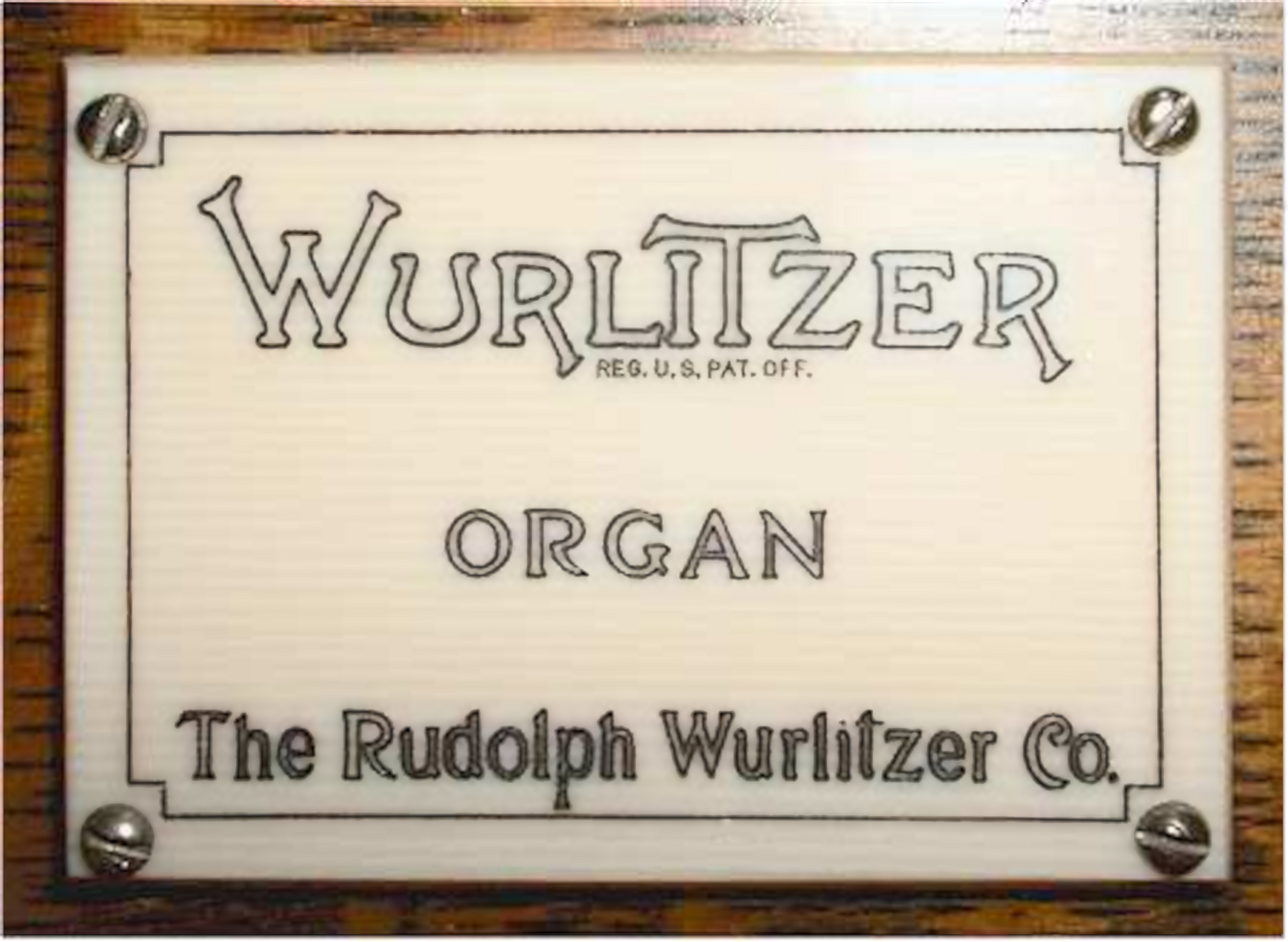
- Type: Subsidiary
- Founded: 1853; 173 years ago
- Founder: Franz Rudolph Wurlitzer
- Defunct: 1985
- Headquarters: Cincinnati, Ohio and North Tonawanda, New York, United States
- Products: Band organ Orchestrion; Nickelodeon; Pipe organ Theatre organ Electric organ Electric piano Acoustic piano Electric guitar Jukebox
- Parent: Baldwin Piano Company
- Website: Wurlitzer

The Rudolph Wurlitzer Company, usually referred to as simply Wurlitzer, is an American company started in Cincinnati in 1853 by German immigrant (Franz) Rudolph Wurlitzer. The company initially imported stringed, woodwind and brass instruments from Germany for resale in the United States. Wurlitzer enjoyed initial success, largely due to defense contracts to provide musical instruments to the U.S. military. In 1880, the company began manufacturing pianos and eventually relocated to North Tonawanda, New York. It quickly expanded to make band organs, orchestrions, player pianos and pipe or theatre organs popular in theatres during the days of silent movies.

Wurlitzer also operated a chain of retail stores where the company's products were sold. As technology evolved, Wurlitzer began producing electric pianos, electronic organs and jukeboxes, and it eventually became known more for jukeboxes and vending machines, which are still made by Wurlitzer, rather than for actual musical instruments.

Wurlitzer's jukebox operations were sold and moved to Germany in 1973. The Wurlitzer piano and organ brands and U.S. manufacturing facilities were acquired by the Baldwin Piano Company in 1988, and most piano manufacturing moved overseas. The Baldwin Co., including its Wurlitzer assets, was acquired by the Gibson Guitar Corporation in about 1996. Ten years later, Gibson acquired Deutsche Wurlitzer and the Wurlitzer Jukebox and Vending Electronics trademarks, briefly reuniting Wurlitzer's best-known products under a single corporate banner in 2006. Baldwin ceased making Wurlitzer-brand pianos in 2009. Vending machines are still manufactured in Germany using the Wurlitzer name under Gibson ownership. The company stopped manufacturing jukeboxes in 2013, but still sells replacement parts.

In 2024, the Wurlitzer brand was reintroduced when Sound Leisure, a British manufacturer of classic-styled jukeboxes, partnered with the Wurlitzer family, launching a new jukebox as an official tribute to the 1940s Wurlitzer 1015.

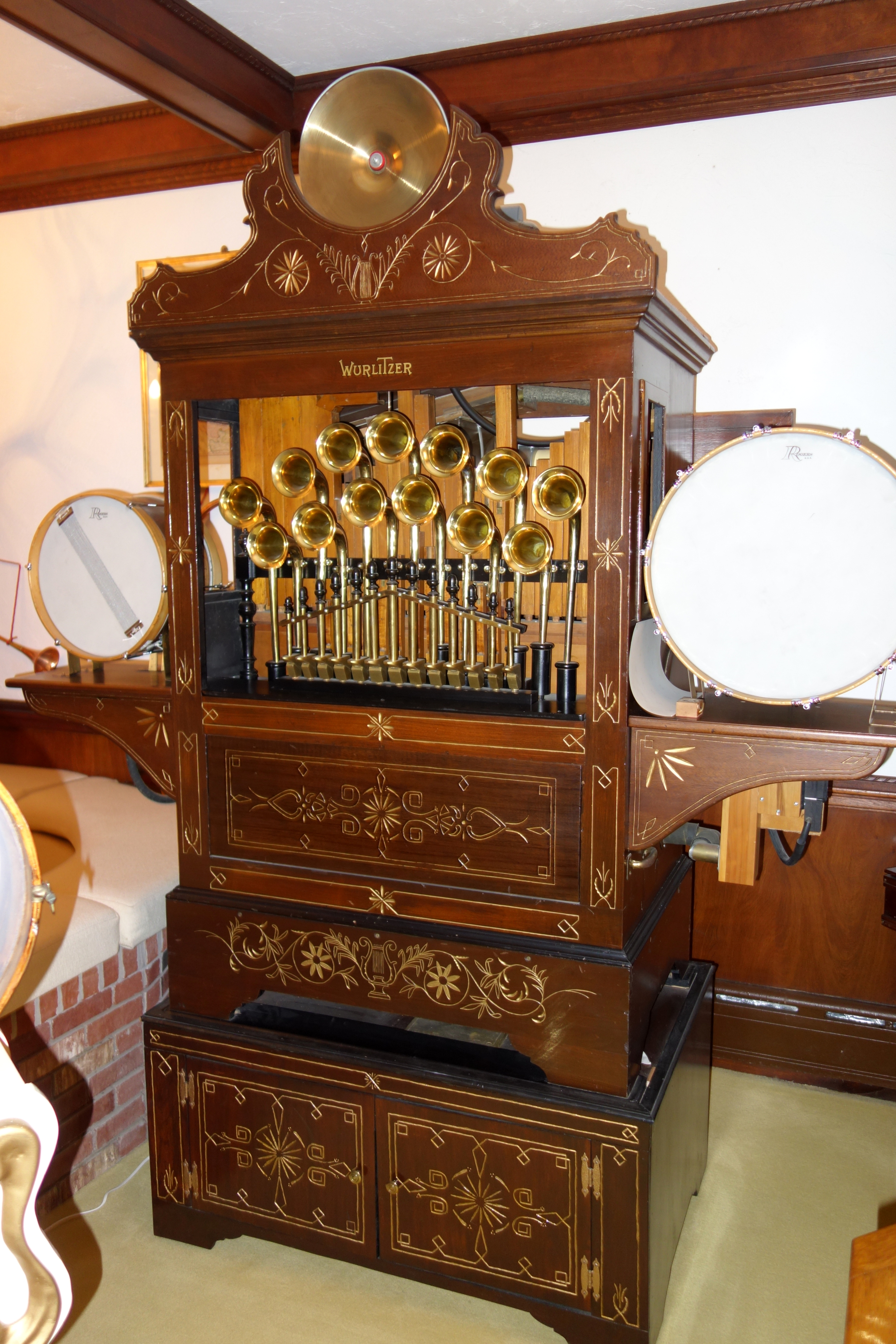
Band organ

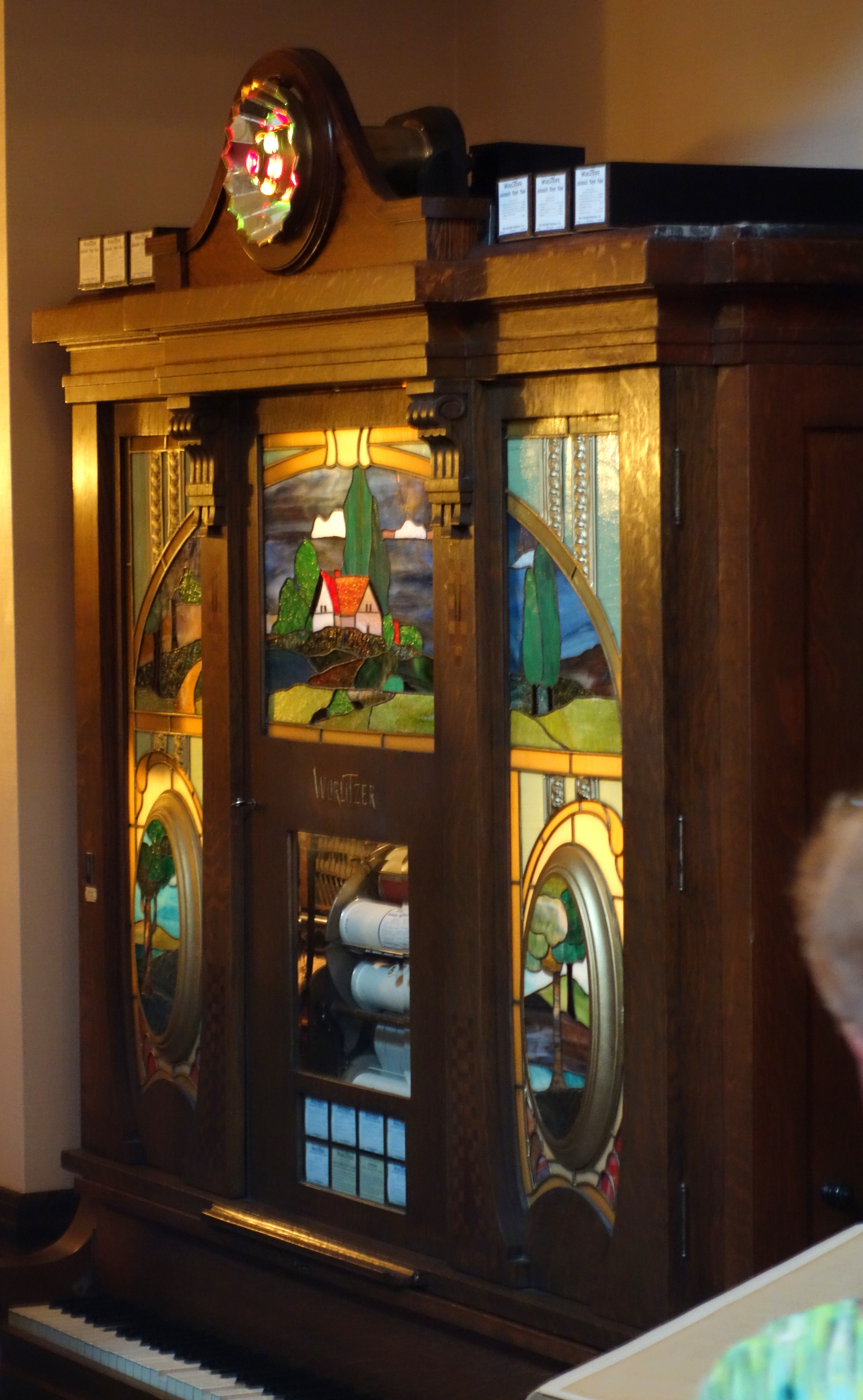
Nickelodeon

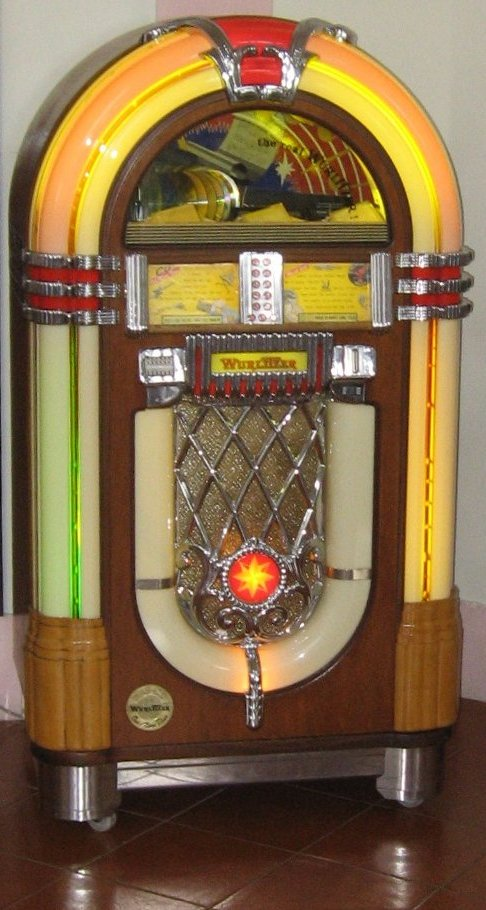
Jukebox

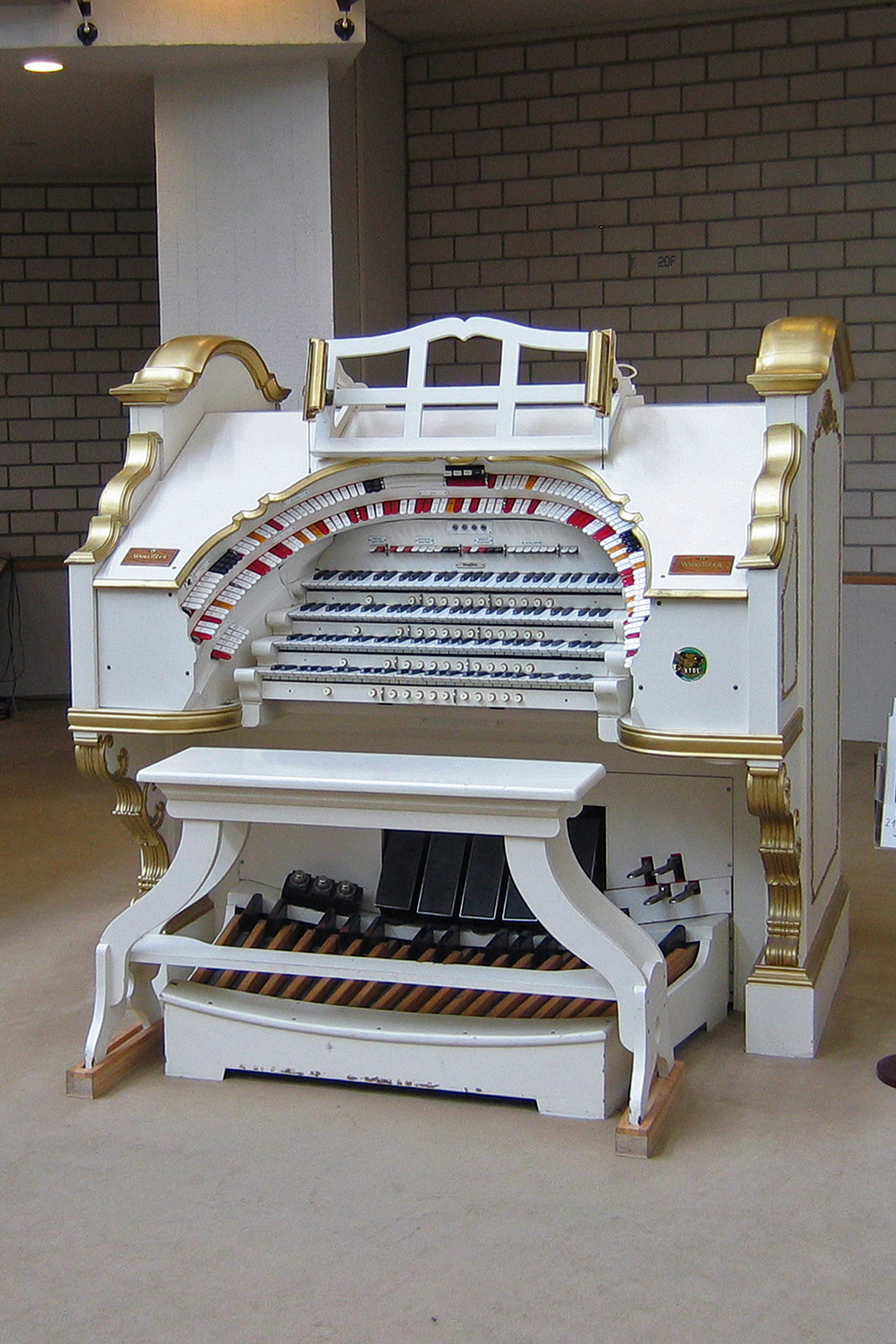
Theatre organ

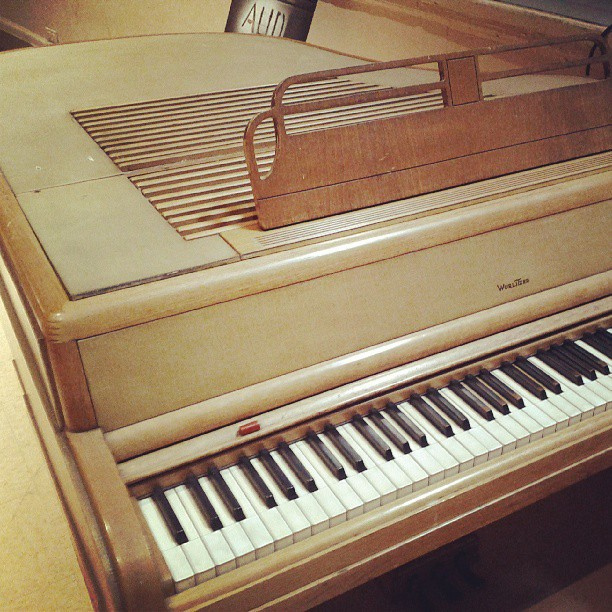
Acoustic piano

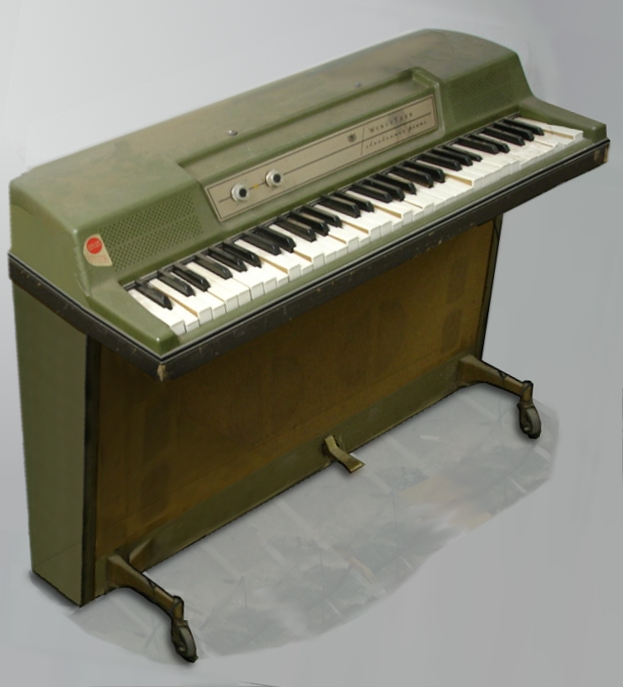
Electric piano

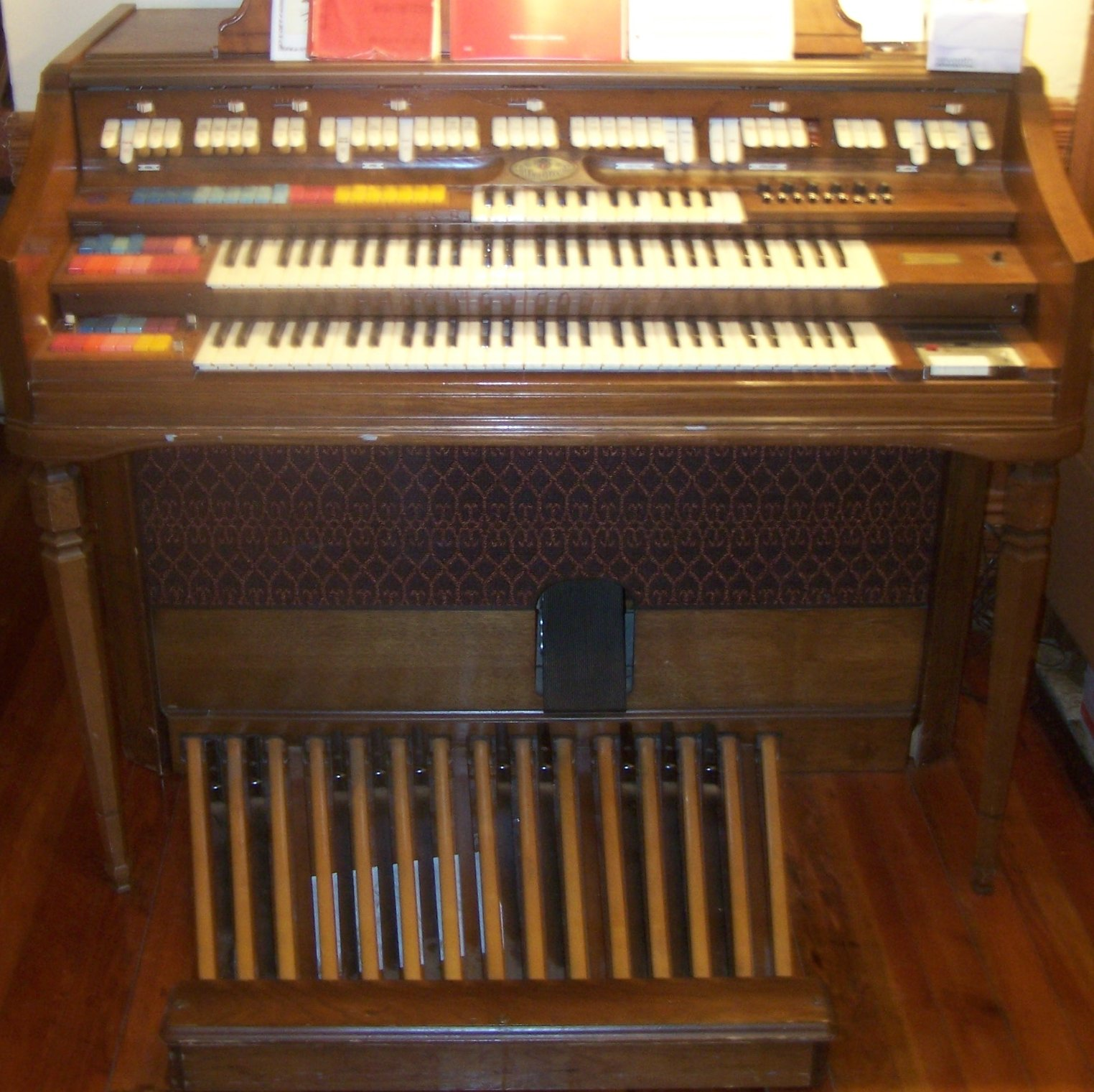
Electronic organ

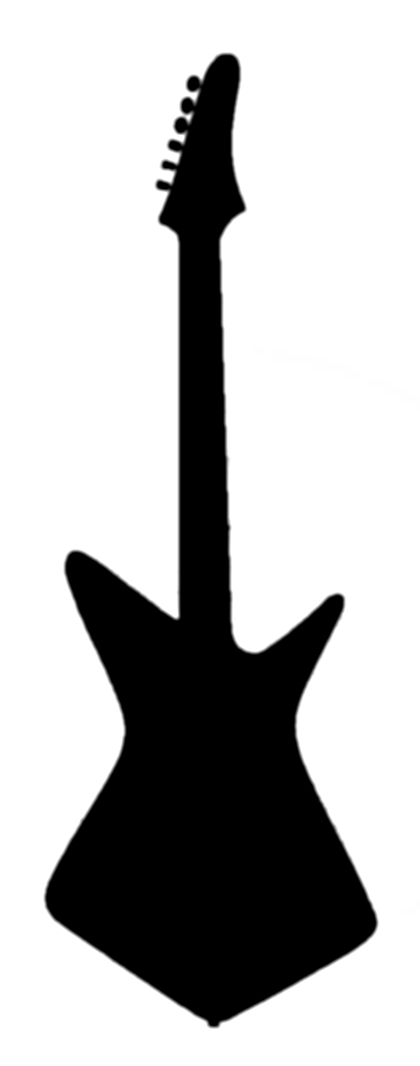
Electric guitar

== History ==
=== 19th century: Import of instruments, production of pianos and organs ===
Franz Rudolph Wurlitzer (1831–1914), an immigrant from Schöneck, Saxony, founded the Wurlitzer Company in Cincinnati in 1853. His sons Howard, Rudolph and Farny successively directed the company after his death. The company initially imported musical instruments from the Wurlitzer family in Germany for resale in the United States. Wurlitzer was an early American defense contractor, being a major supplier of musical instruments to the U.S. military during the American Civil War and Spanish–American War. In 1880, Wurlitzer started manufacturing its own pianos, which the company sold through its retail outlets in Chicago. In 1896, Wurlitzer manufactured its first coin-operated pianos.

In the late 1800s, fairs were popular. As crowds grew and mechanical rides began to appear, there was a need for louder music. The fairground organ was developed. Eugene de Kleist of North Tonawanda, New York, was an early builder of such organs (also called "barrel organs") for use in carousels. Wurlitzer bought an interest in de Kleist's North Tonawanda Barrel Organ Factory in 1897.

=== 20th century: Adding jukeboxes, radios and string and wind instruments ===
In 1909, Wurlitzer bought the North Tonawanda Barrel Organ Factory, and he moved all Wurlitzer manufacturing from Ohio to New York. In 1909, the company began making innovative automatic harps that were more durable than European prototypes, and from 1924 to the 1930s, eight models were available. The "Mighty Wurlitzer" theatre organ was introduced in late 1910 and became Wurlitzer's most famous product. Wurlitzer theatre organs are installed around the world in theatres, museums, churches and private residences.

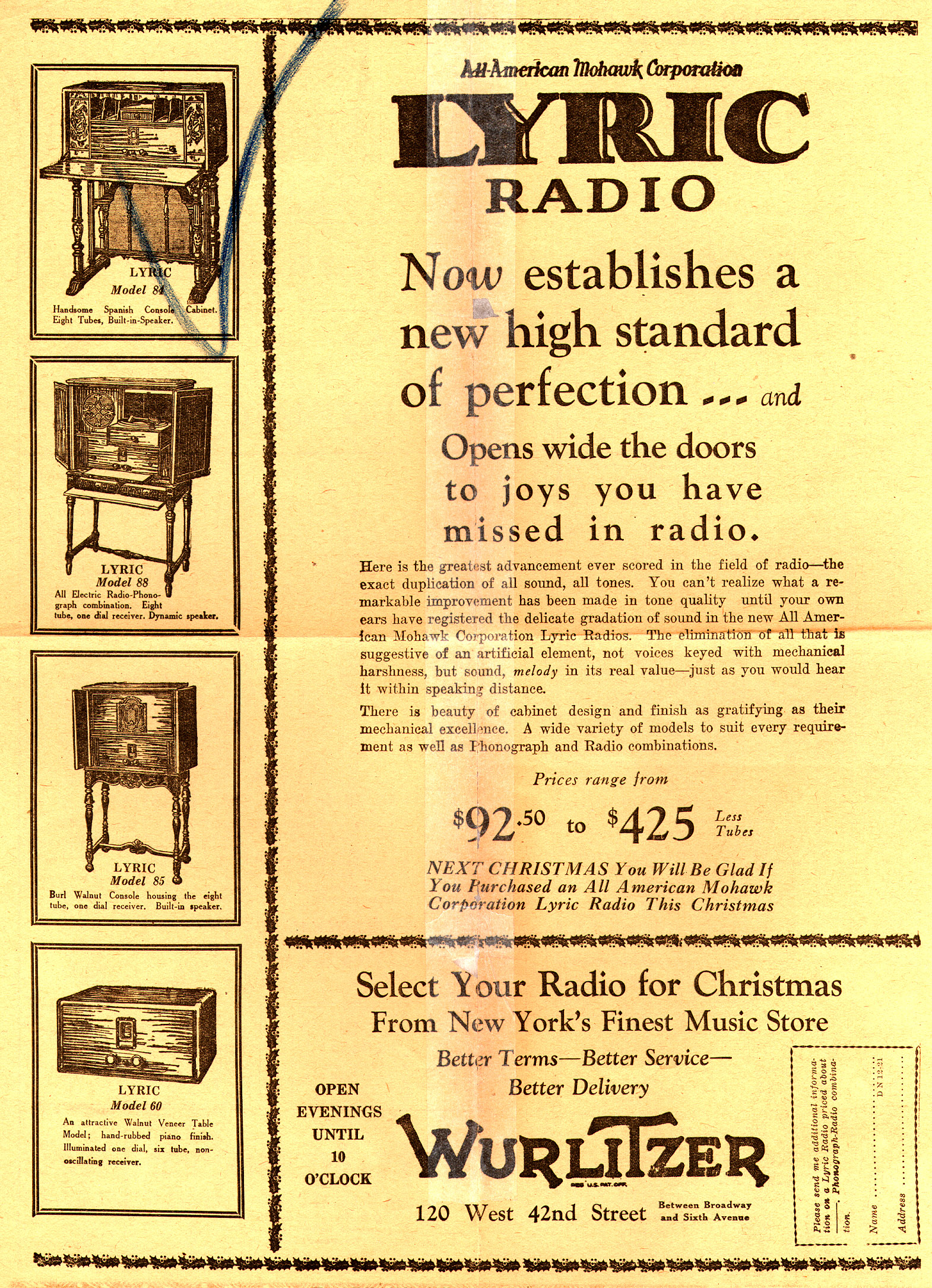
American Mohawk Lyric Radio as Mfd. by Wurlitzer c. 1920s

With the onset of World War I, imports from Germany became problematic, and Wurlitzer found it necessary to increase manufacturing in the US. In the early 1930s, Wurlitzer built a new, state-of-the-art manufacturing and marketing facility in North Tonawanda, complete with employee recreation areas, showers and a cafeteria. It had two landscaped avenues which fanned out over the area in front of the factory, creating a park and parkway setting off of Niagara Falls Boulevard. Some tree and lamp post installations, laid diagonal, remain to mark these roads. The growing company held its first annual Convention of associated businesses in Buffalo, New York at the Statler Hotel in September of 1937, complete with a three day program of events and a parade. The surviving complex, particularly the central front tower building and main entrance hall, is now a National Historic Landmark. Wurlitzer abandoned production of nickelodeons but continued to manufacture the music rolls for player piano music through a wholly owned subsidiary called the Endless Roll Music Company. Wurlitzer also assumed production of Lyric brand radios from the All American Mohawk Radio Company in Chicago. Lyric radios were a high-end console radio, which retailed for as much as $425 in 1929 (approximately $5,800 in 2014 dollars).

In addition to business acquisitions, Wurlitzer entered into several joint ventures with James Armitage, George Herschell, and other businessmen from the area. He constructed a separate plant at Goundry and Oliver Streets in downtown North Tonawanda specializing in short production runs to manufacture organs and hurdy-gurdies for amusement parks, circuses, roller rinks and carnival midways. Amusement rides, particularly carousels, were assembled at the facility.

Circa 1933, the Wurlitzer name gradually became more associated with jukeboxes than with musical instruments. In 1942, organ production at the North Tonawanda factory ceased and production was shifted to the manufacture of bomb proximity fuses for World War II. After the war, normal production efforts resumed but with more focus on radios, jukeboxes and small electronic organs for private homes. The Rivera Theatre, also in North Tonawanda, possesses one of these historic organs as well as Shea's Performing Arts Center in Buffalo, New York.

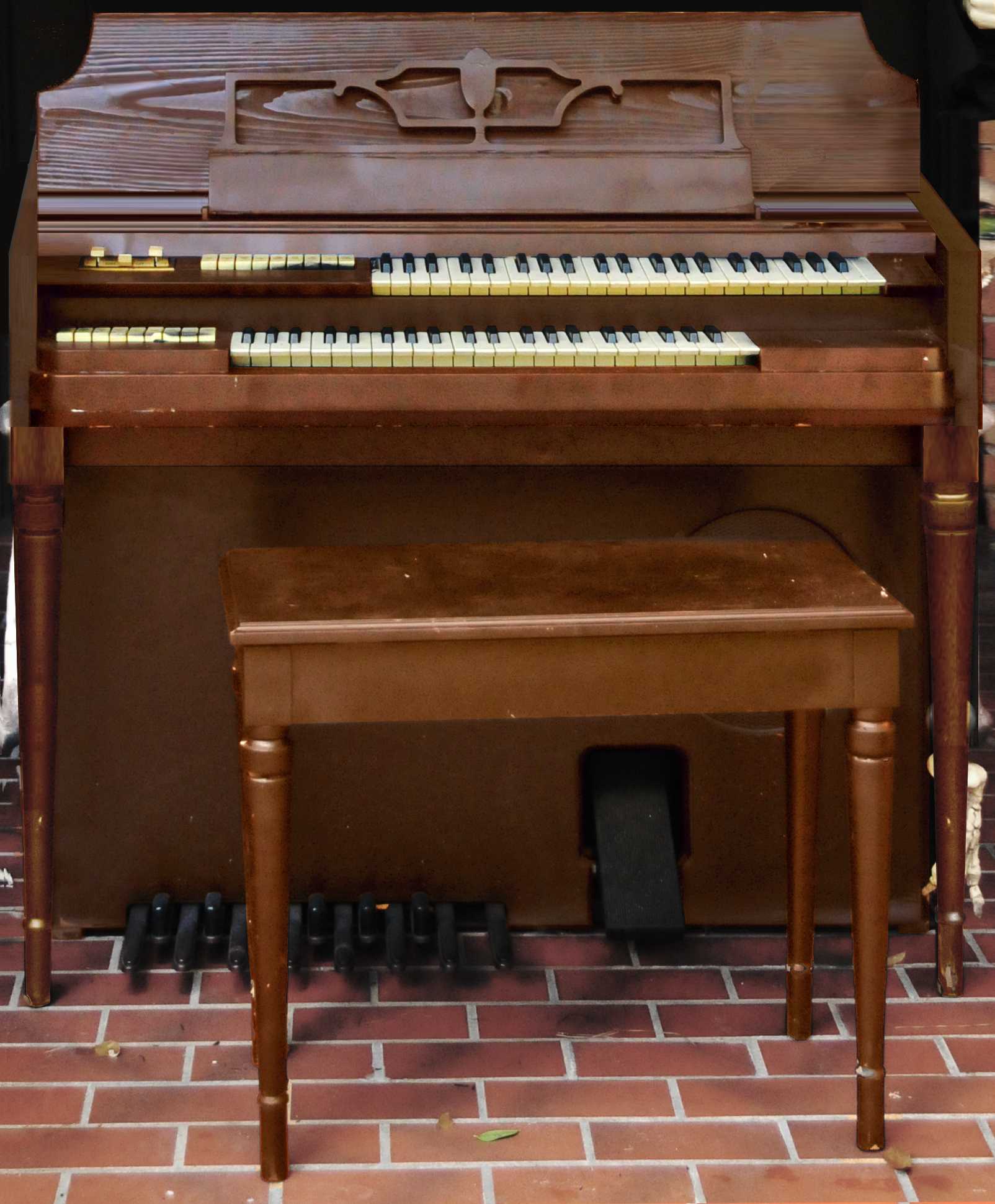
Wurlitzer Model 44 electrostatic reed organ (1953–64)

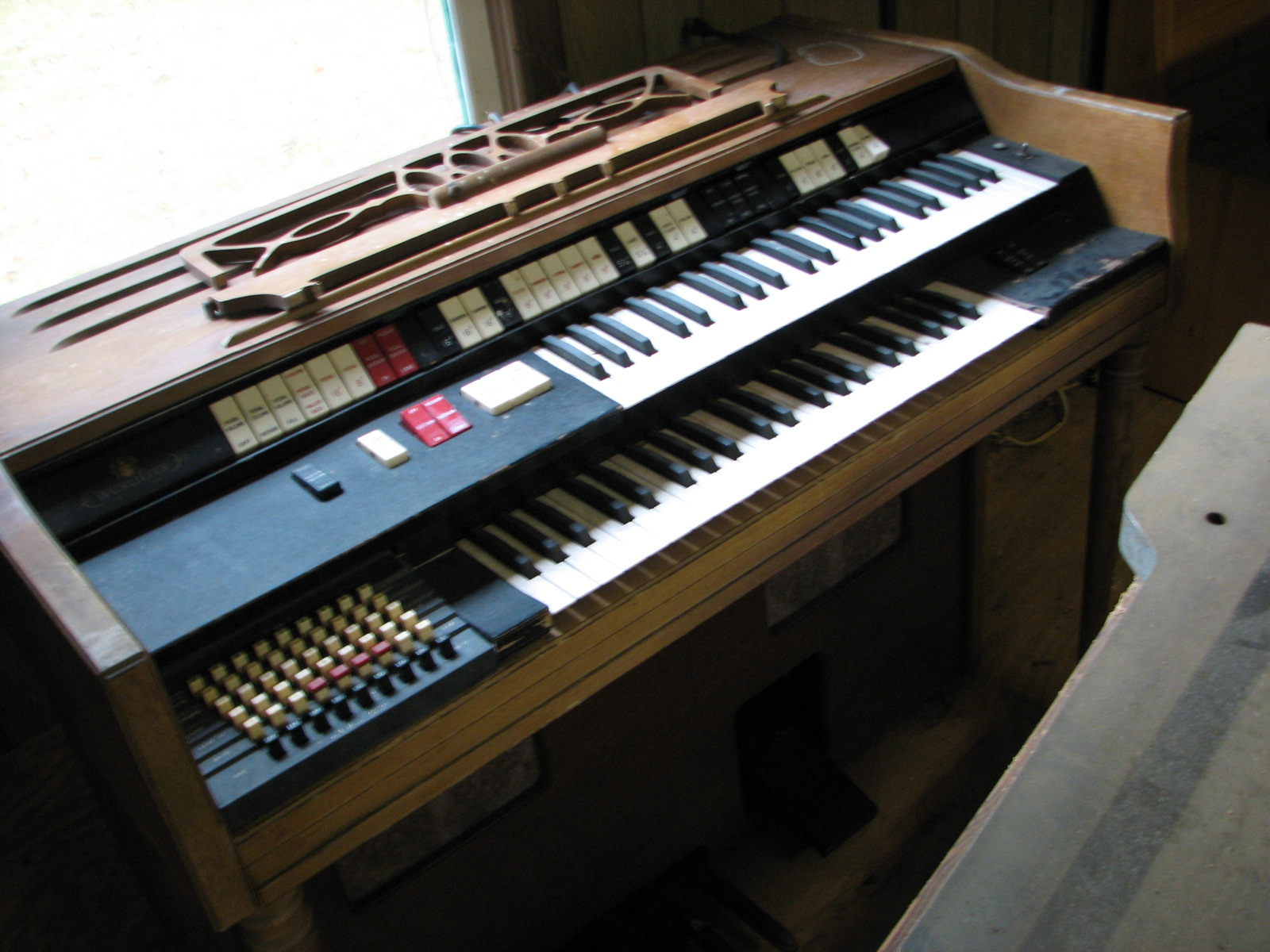
Wurlitzer 4100 BP electronic organ with chord unit (1959–1963)

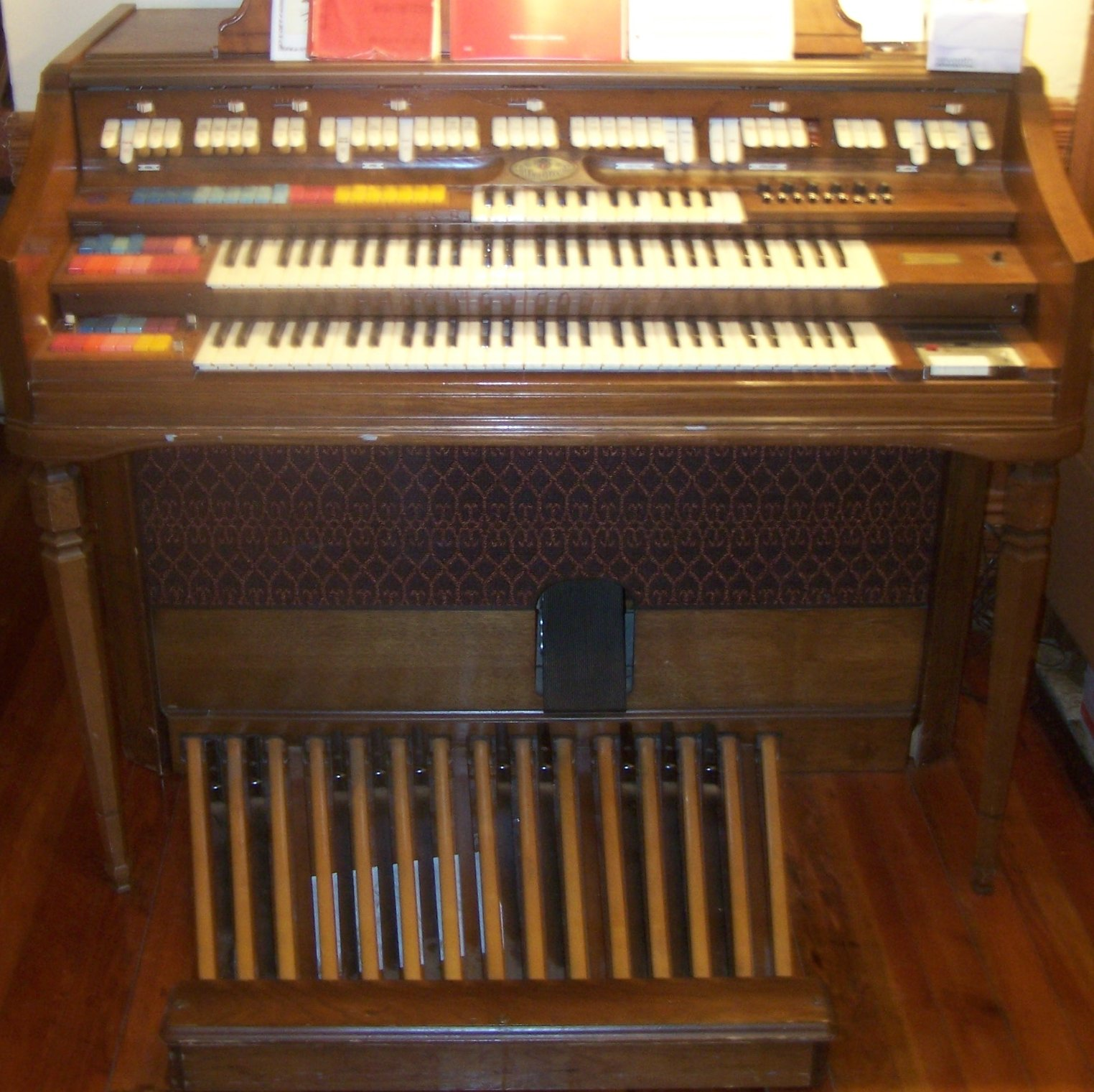
Wurlitzer Model 805 electronic organ with Orbit III monophonic synth (upper mini key)

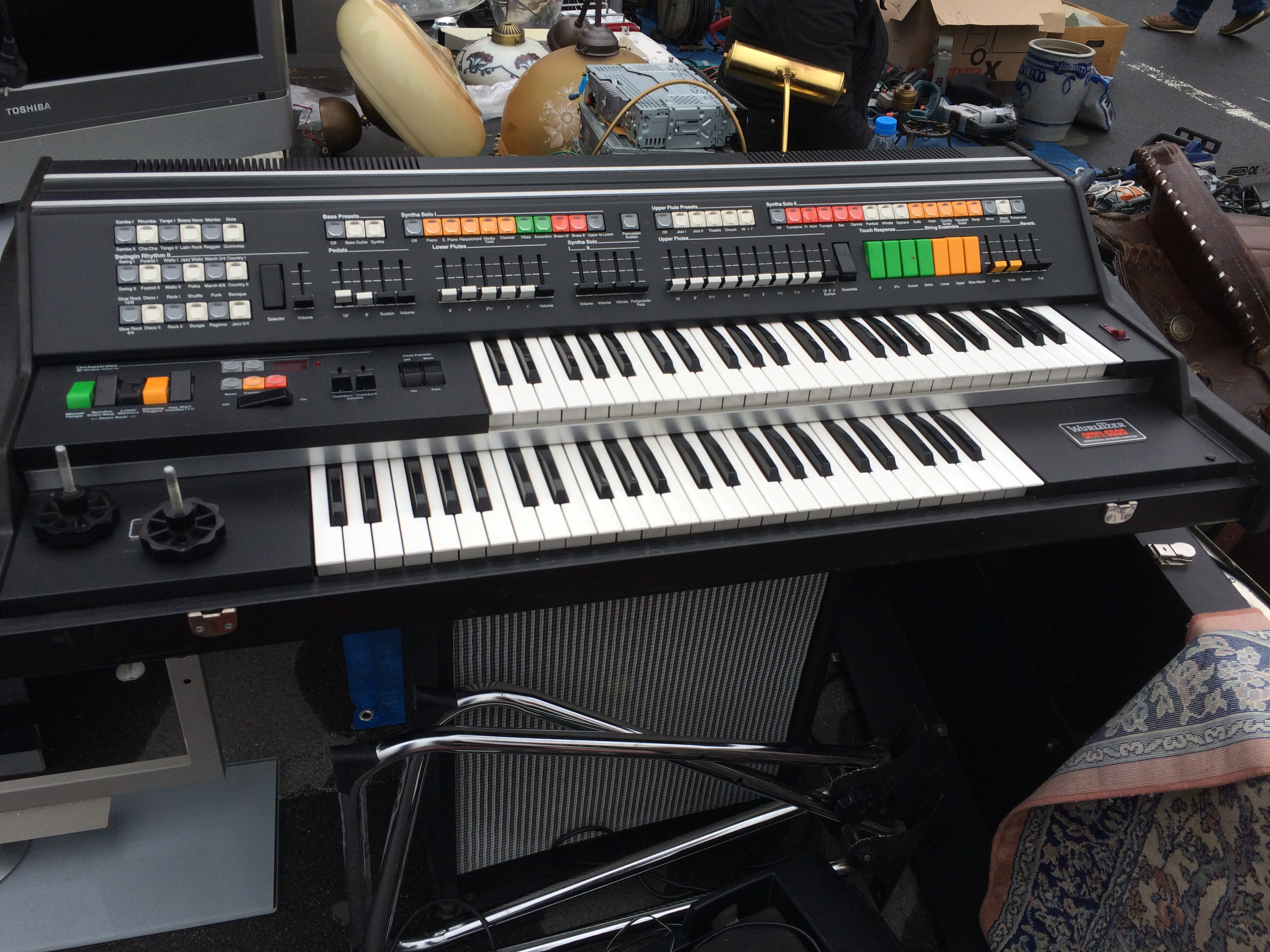
Wurlitzer Omni 6500 (1985)

Among Wurlitzer's electronic instruments, beginning with electrostatic reed organs in 1947, the most important have been the fully electronic organs, especially the two-manual-and-pedals spinet type (from 1971 with synthesizer features) for domestic use. In the mid-1950s, Wurlitzer began manufacturing portable electric pianos.

Rembert Wurlitzer (1904–1963) independently directed the firm's violin department from 1949 until his death in 1963, building it into a leading international center for rare string instruments.

In the 1960s, Wurlitzer ventured into new instrument markets. In 1964, Wurlitzer bought the rights, registered trademarks, copyrights, patents, engineering records and factory of the Henry C. Martin Band Instrument Company, which manufactured brass wind instruments in Elkhart, Indiana (not to be confused with the C.F. Martin & Company guitar maker). In 1967, Wurlitzer entered the guitar market as the sole distributor of Holman-Woodell guitars, which were originally sold under the Wurlitzer brand. Wurlitzer then switched to an Italian guitar maker, Welson, before abandoning guitar sales altogether in 1969.

While original Wurlitzer jukeboxes sold well, technology soon outpaced Wurlitzer. By the 1950s, other companies dominated the jukebox market. Wurlitzer sold its Martin rights to LeBlanc in 1971, to focus on its core markets with pianos and jukeboxes. In 1973, Wurlitzer sold its jukebox brand to a German company and closed the North Tonawanda factory. The former Wurlitzer complex hosts a business park, contractors' supply store, storage, offices, restaurants and a Platter's Chocolate factory. Piano and organ manufacturing continued in Mississippi and Arkansas factories for several years.

The Baldwin Piano Company purchased Wurlitzer's piano-making assets and brand in 1988. Subsequently, the Gibson Guitar Corporation acquired Baldwin and operated it as a wholly owned subsidiary.

=== 21st century: Limited branding of pianos, jukeboxes and vending machines ===
Gibson acquired Deutsche Wurlitzer Jukebox and Electronics Vending brand in 2006, briefly bringing the primary Wurlitzer product lines back under one owner. However, Baldwin stopped using the Wurlitzer name on pianos by the end of 2009. Gibson now uses the Wurlitzer brand name exclusively for vending machines.

In 2021, the original Wurlitzer family re-secured the rights to the Wurlitzer brand for several music and consumer electronics categories and regions. The brand was reintroduced in 2024 when Sound Leisure, a British manufacturer of classic styled jukeboxes, partnered with the Wurlitzer family to launch a new jukebox in tribute to the 1940's Wurlitzer 1015.

== Products ==
=== Acoustic pianos ===
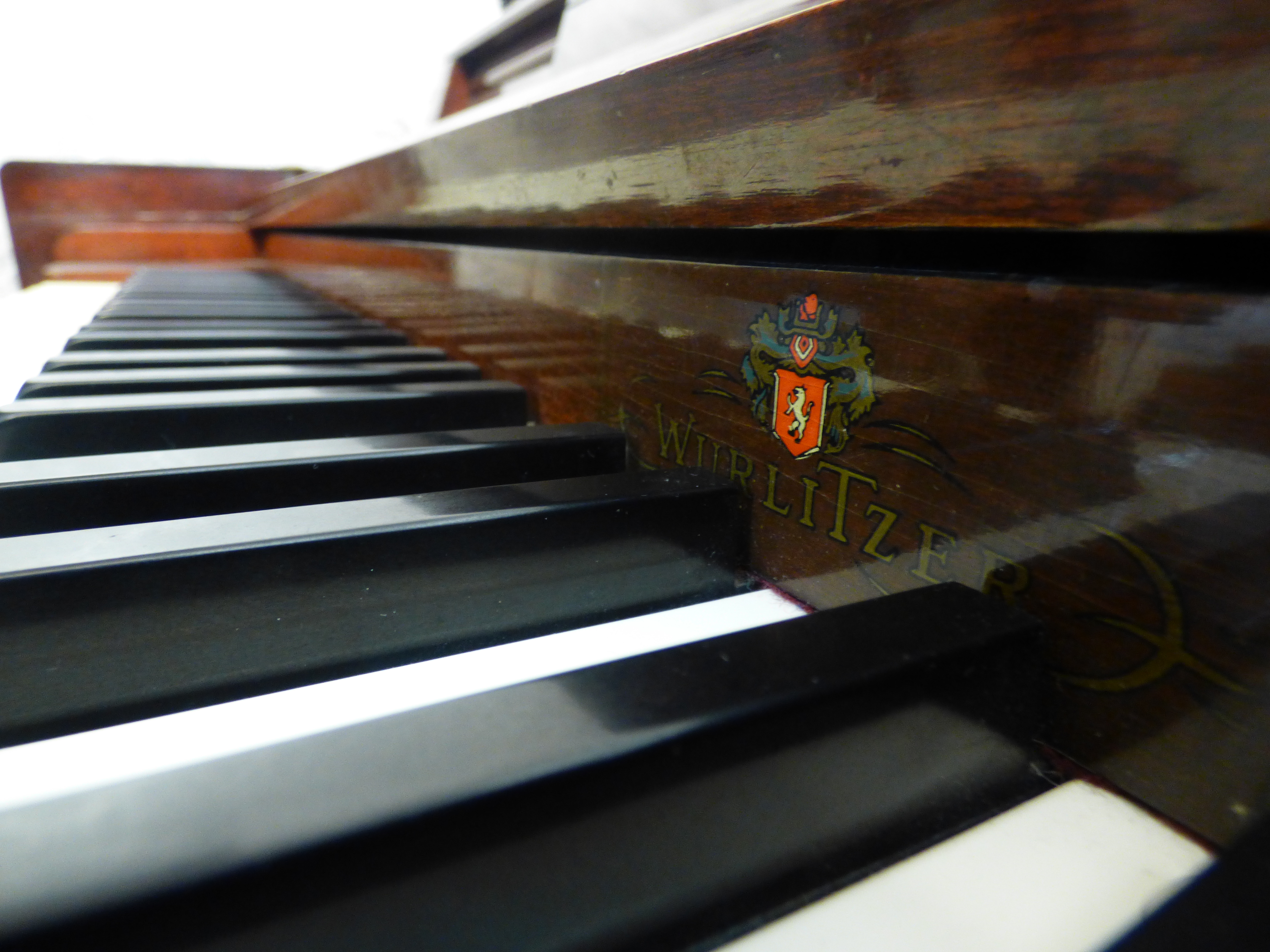
Keyboard of a Wurlitzer acoustic piano

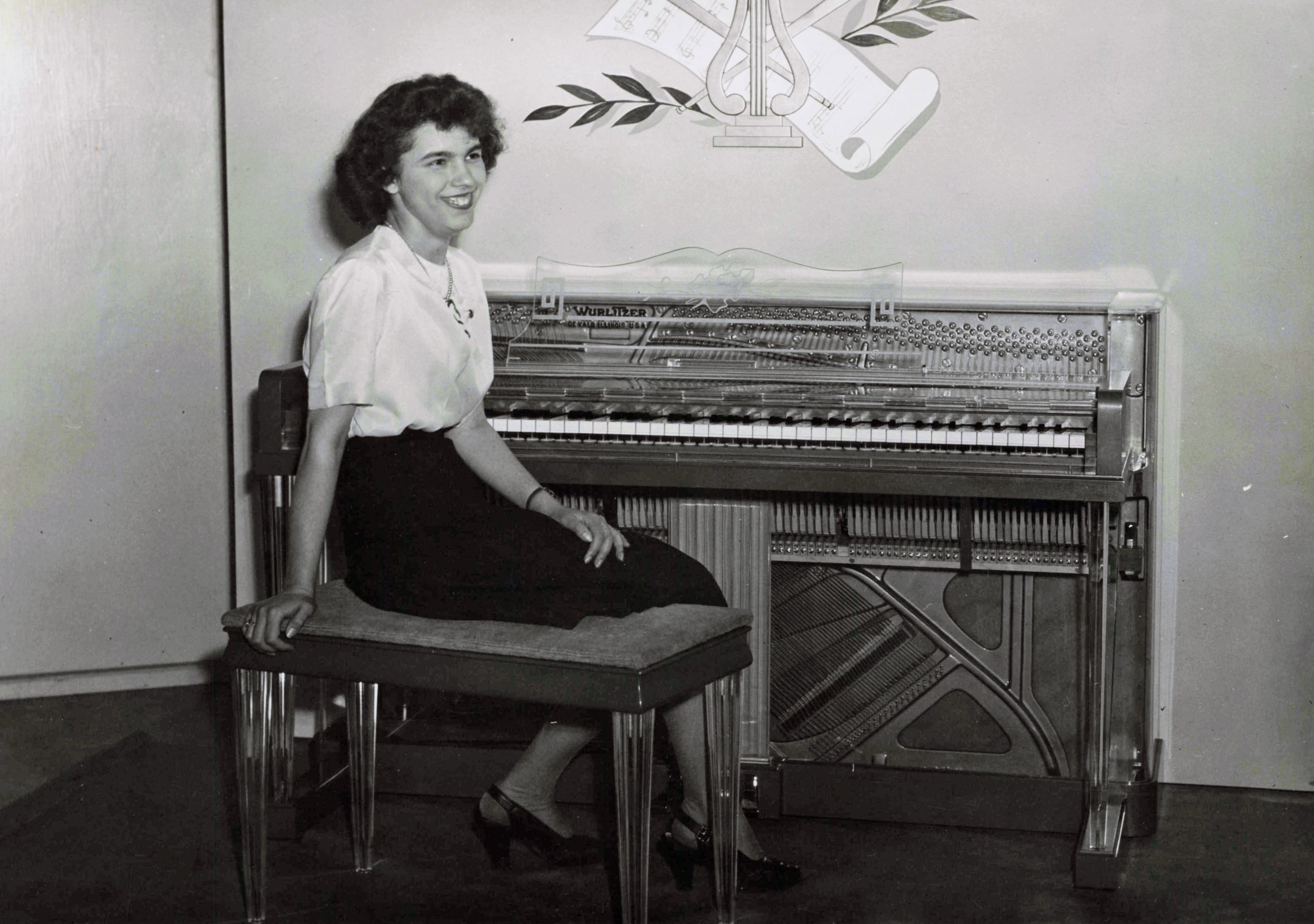
Acoustic piano labelled "Wurlitzer, DeKalb, Illinois, USA" in 1950

Beginning in about 1880, Wurlitzer built a full line of upright and grand pianos. In 1914, Wurlitzer became the sole distributor of Melville Clark Pianos and in 1919 acquired the Melville Clark company. Wurlitzer continued to manufacture pianos at the Clark factory in DeKalb, Illinois under the Melville Clark name. Other brands which have been manufactured by Wurlitzer are Apollo, De Kalb, Julius Bauer, Farney, Kingston, Kurtzman, Merrium, Schaff Bros. and Underwood.

Wurlitzer excelled in piano design. It developed the "Pentagonal Soundboard", "Tone crafted hammers", and other unique innovations to help its pianos produce a richer, fuller tone. In 1935, it was one of the first manufacturers to offer the spinet piano to the mass market. This 39-inch high piano was an instant sensation. The spinet came at an opportune time, when many Americans could not afford a full upright or grand.

=== Butterfly grand pianos ===
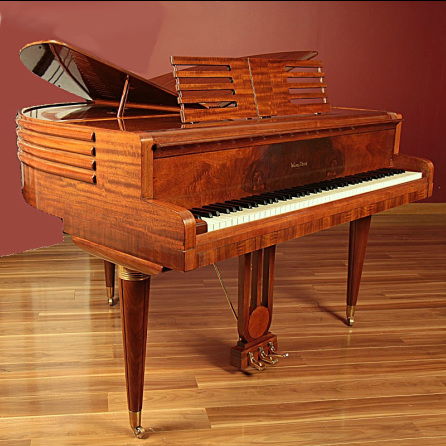
Wurlitzer Butterfly Art Deco Deluxe 88-key piano – Model 1411

In the mid 1930s, Wurlitzer unveiled a line of symmetrical grand pianos, or "Butterfly" grands. At this point in Wurlitzer history, all piano manufacturing was exclusively in DeKalb, Illinois. Models ranged from the Student Butterfly having 44 keys, to the 88 key Deluxe Art Deco Streamline Model 1411.

Model 1411 had many innovative patented features. A quartet of raised banding around the body were actually functional sound port slots that radiate all the way around the case, allowing sound to escape the cabinet with the lids closed. The most notable feature was the symmetrical lids that opened like butterfly wings. These lids open to reveal a secondary ported removable inner lid. These lids are decoratively cut out to allow the sound to ring out via a large F hole, similar to a violin, as well as multiple radial slots along the outer edge. Another design innovation was the "Tone Amplifier". The device consists of a metal flat bar between the piano rim, running under the bass bridge to a fixed point on the soundboard, designed to bring out the tone on a smaller piano. A screw mechanism on top of the bridge allowed adjustment of the tonal output.

Wurlitzer made at least three different versions of the 73 key model butterfly. Each had variations in appointments, such as legs, lyres, and sheet music stands.

=== Band organs ===
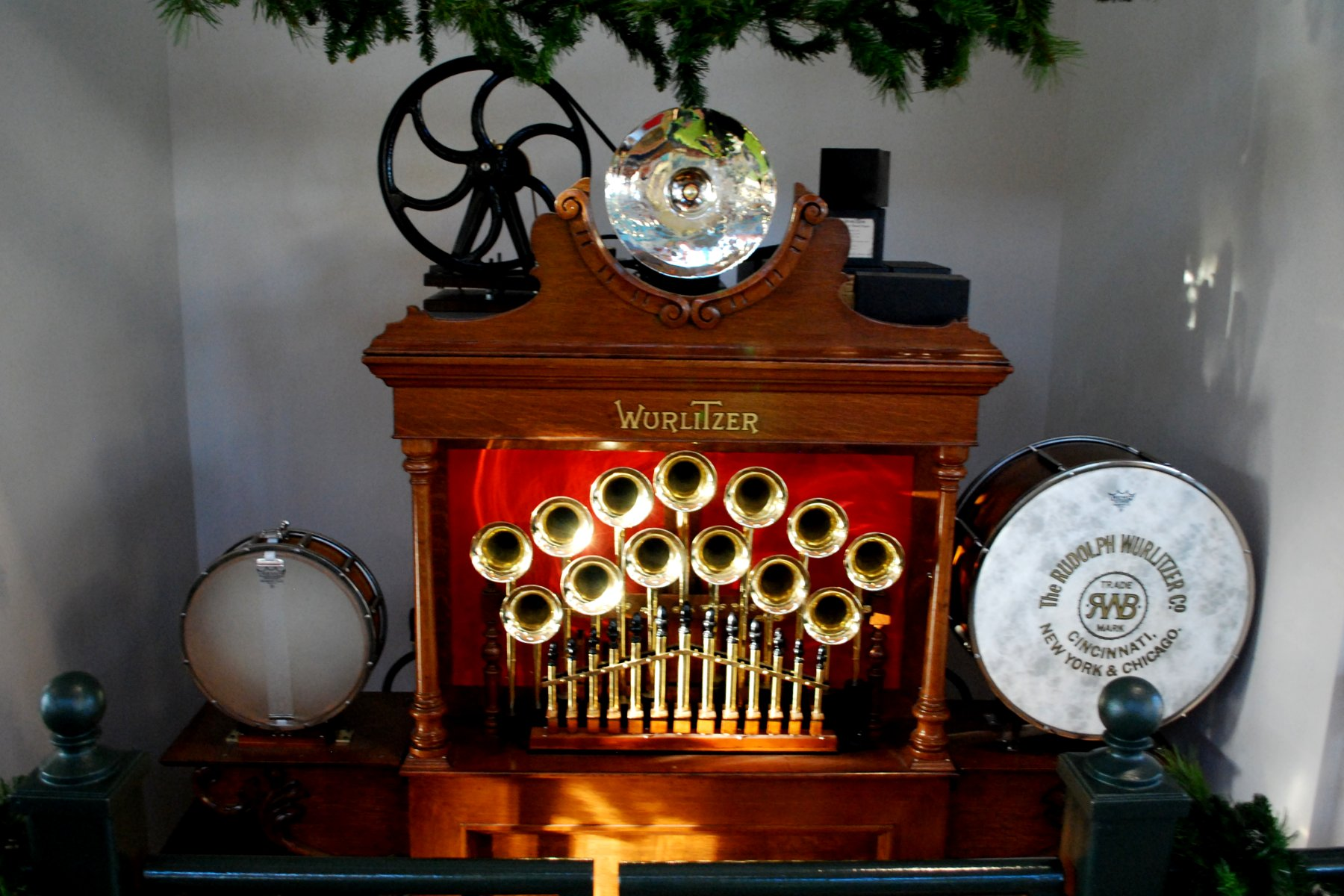
The Pullen Park Carousel Wurlitzer 125 Band Organ in Raleigh, North Carolina

After the United States Government imposed high import tariffs on street and fairground organ importation in 1892, Wurlitzer began producing mechanical organs. Most were small barrel organs, playing from a pinned barrel and powered by either steam or cranked by hand. Many of these organs have cases finished in dark (and sometimes black) wood, with gold incised designs, not unlike those of the European manufacturers of barrel organs.

As parts were not subject to import tariffs, almost all Wurlitzer band organs are copied from designs by European manufacturers. For example, the style 104 and style 105 were copied from a Gebrüder Bruder barrel organ. The style 146 was identical copied from Brüder's model 79 fairground organ, except that the side wings (portions of the façade concealing the drums) were removed. The style 157 was copied from a Gavioli special style of organ (only 2 or 3 of this style of organ are known to exist; the former organ at Dorney Park & Wildwater Kingdom was one, but it was destroyed in a fire). And, the style 165 is copied from the Gebrüder Bruder "Elite Apollo Orchester."

As demand for organs grew from the fairground operators, Wurlitzer was approached by Eugene de Kleist, an-ex employee of Limonaire Frères and the founder of the North Tonawanda Barrel Organ Factory. After de Kleist developed the tonophone for the company, which won a gold medal at the 1901 Pan-American Exposition, Wurlitzer invested in his company. Wurlitzer bought de Kleist's interest in the business in 1909 and assumed operation of the North Tonawanda factory. The new company invested in new technology, resulting in the adoption of electric motors, and the music source was changed from pinned barrels to perforated paper rolls similar to a player piano roll.

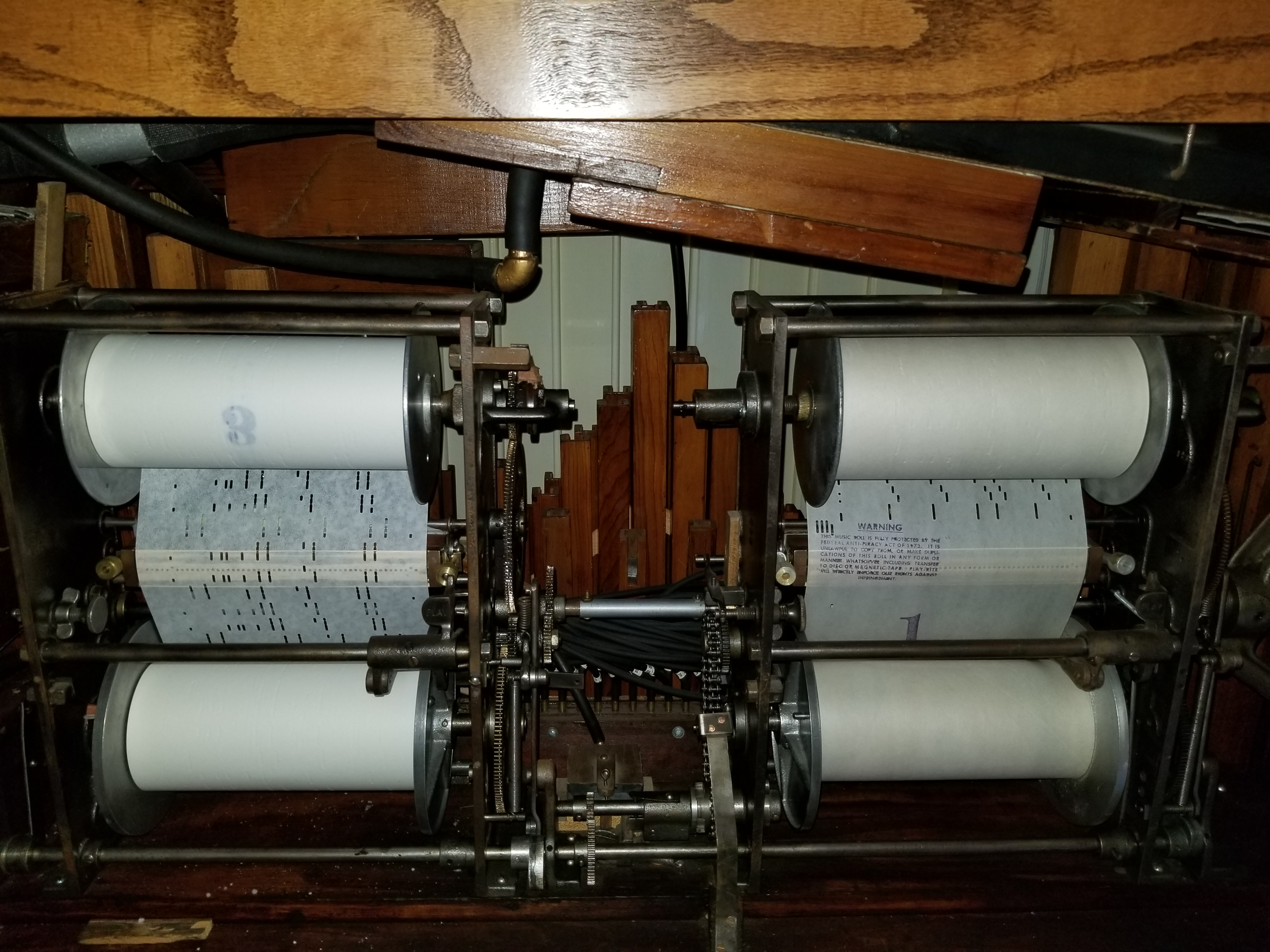
Duplex roll mechanism of a Wurlitzer 153 band organ

In addition to manufacturing band organs, Wurlitzer also converted band organs made by other companies to their roll scales. This generally resulted in the converted organ having an expanded musical library due to the vast amount of available Wurlitzer music rolls. However, these conversions sometimes required modifications to the organ's pipes and could permanently change the sound of the converted organ.

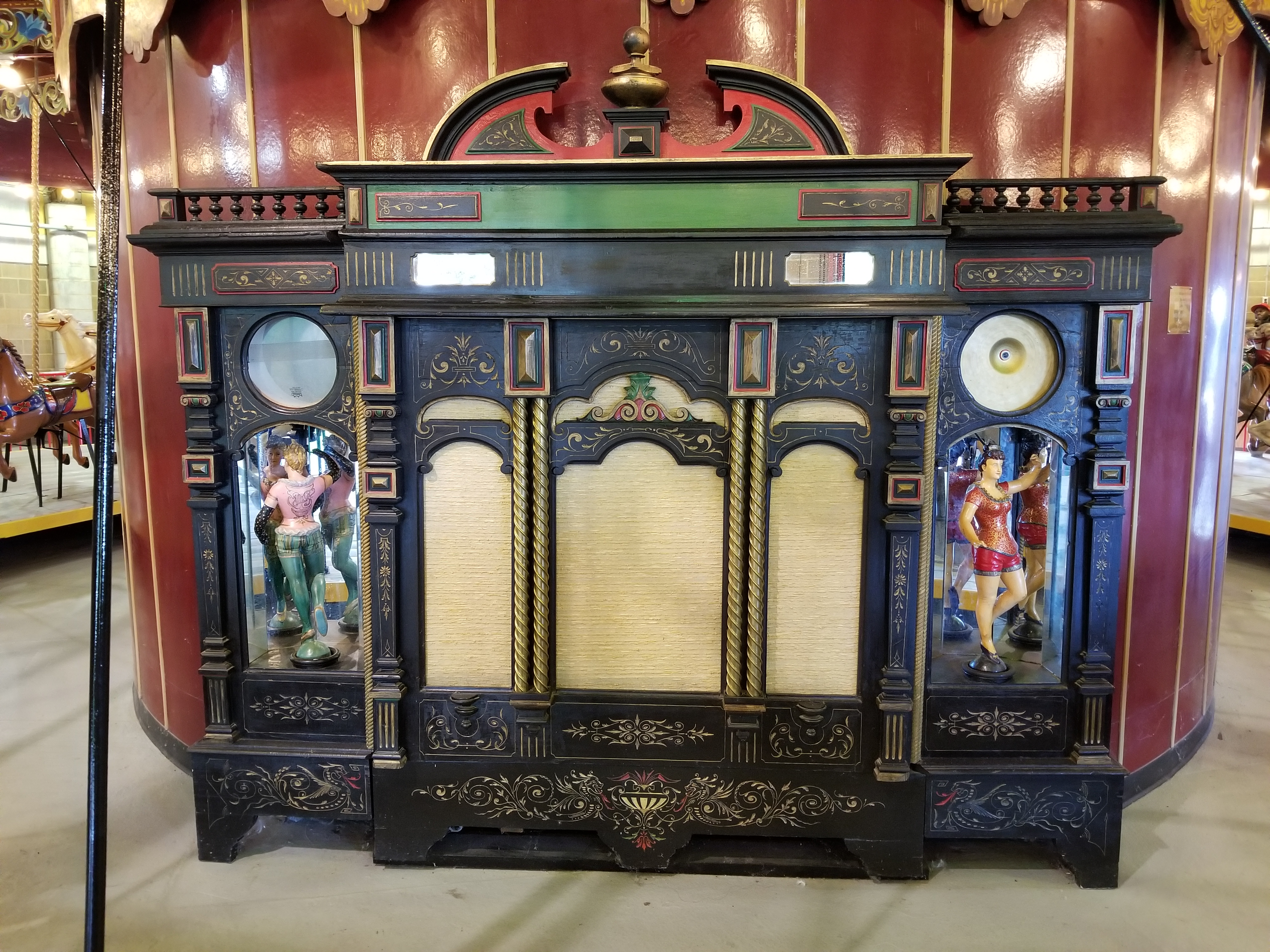
The Frati & Co. Band Organ at the Lakeside Park Carousel in Port Dalhousie, Ontario, is an example of a band organ converted by Wurlitzer to play the Wurlitzer 150 roll scale.

The production of Wurlitzer organs ceased in 1939, the last organ to leave the factory being a style 165 organ in a 157 case (done because Wurlitzer had an extra 157 case remaining in the factory and the owner didn't mind the change). During the Great Depression leading up to the end of production, various cost-cutting measures were made, such as the substitution of brass horn and trumpet pipes for ones made of wood (though arguably the change from brass to wood may have been due to the shrill sound produced by the brass pipes which some people may have found unpleasant; wood pipes produced a mellower sound).

Some orchestrions made by the company can be found at Clark's Trading Post, Lincoln, New Hampshire, the Music Hall, Nevada City, Montana, and the Jasper Sanfilippo Collection at Victorian Palace, Barrington Hills, Illinois.

=== Nickelodeons and player pianos ===
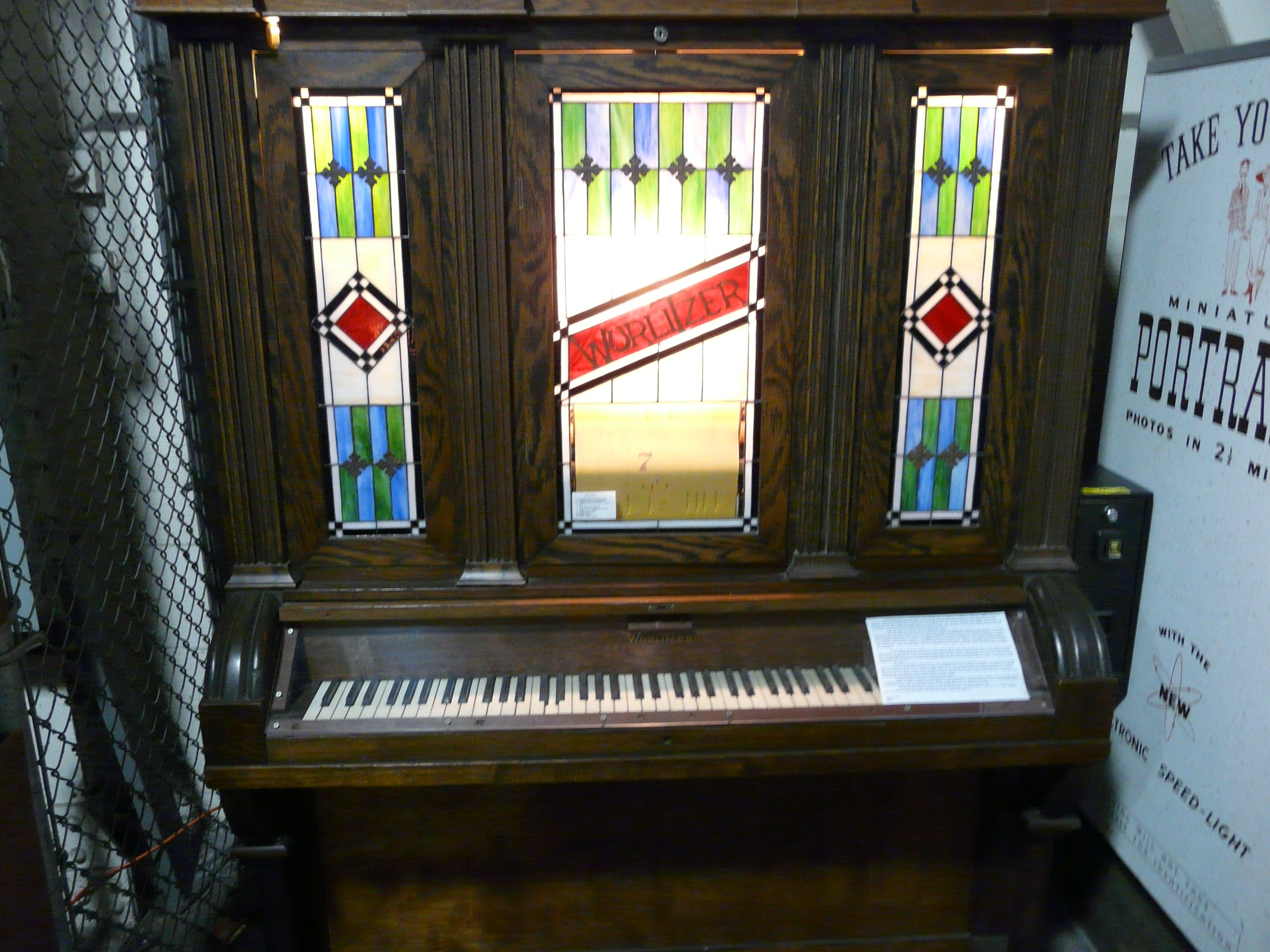
Wurlitzer nickelodeon

Wurlitzer, starting around 1900 until circa 1935 produced nickelodeon pianos, or coin pianos, which are electrically operated player pianos that take coins to operate, like a jukebox.

The company produced various models of nickelodeons, such as the early Wurlitzer Mandolin Quartette – Wurlitzer's alternative to the Regina Sublima Piano. This machine has a reiterating piano with mandolin attachment along with an accompanying piano. They later introduced the Wurlitzer A.P.P. roll; a universal roll to be used on all subsequent Wurlitzer nickelodeons. Models such as the B(X), C(X), D(X) and I(X) use this roll.

Wurlitzer also produced an automatic roll changer system so when a roll finished rewinding another was put on in a carousel-like system. An 'X' at the end of a model number indicates that model was fitted with a roll changer.

Records indicate Wurlitzer sold player piano mechanisms to other manufacturers who installed Wurlitzer components in their own pianos and sold them under other brand names. One example is the Milner player piano company. Milner pianos were built in Cincinnati at a time consistent with Wurlitzer's presence there. Company records suggest Wurlitzer acquired the Milner company in addition to the several other companies acquired by Wurlitzer over the years, but it is possible that Milner may have simply used Wurlitzer components in their own product.

=== Theatre organs ===
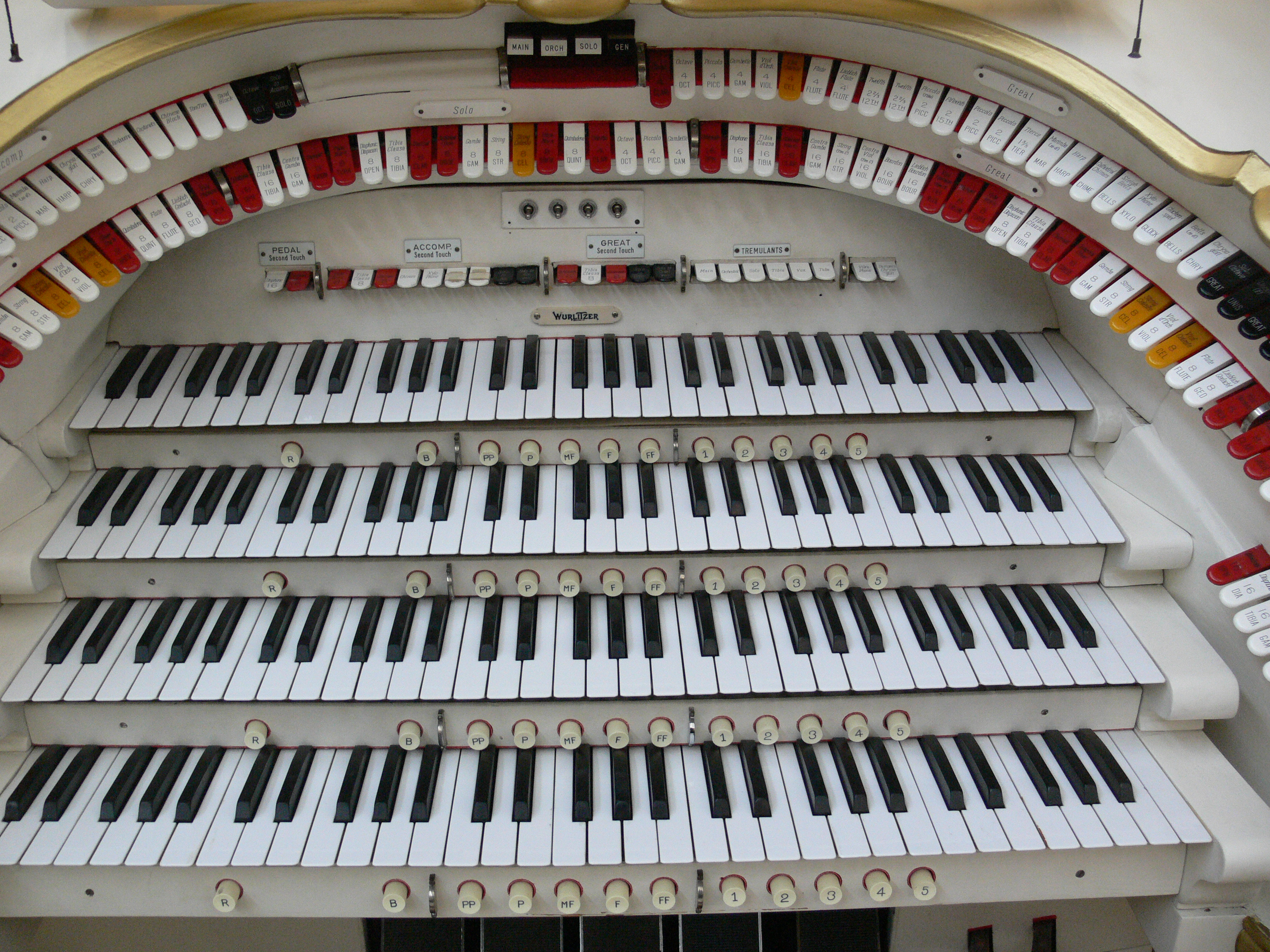
The keyboard of a "Mighty Wurlitzer", from the Berlin Musical Instrument Museum

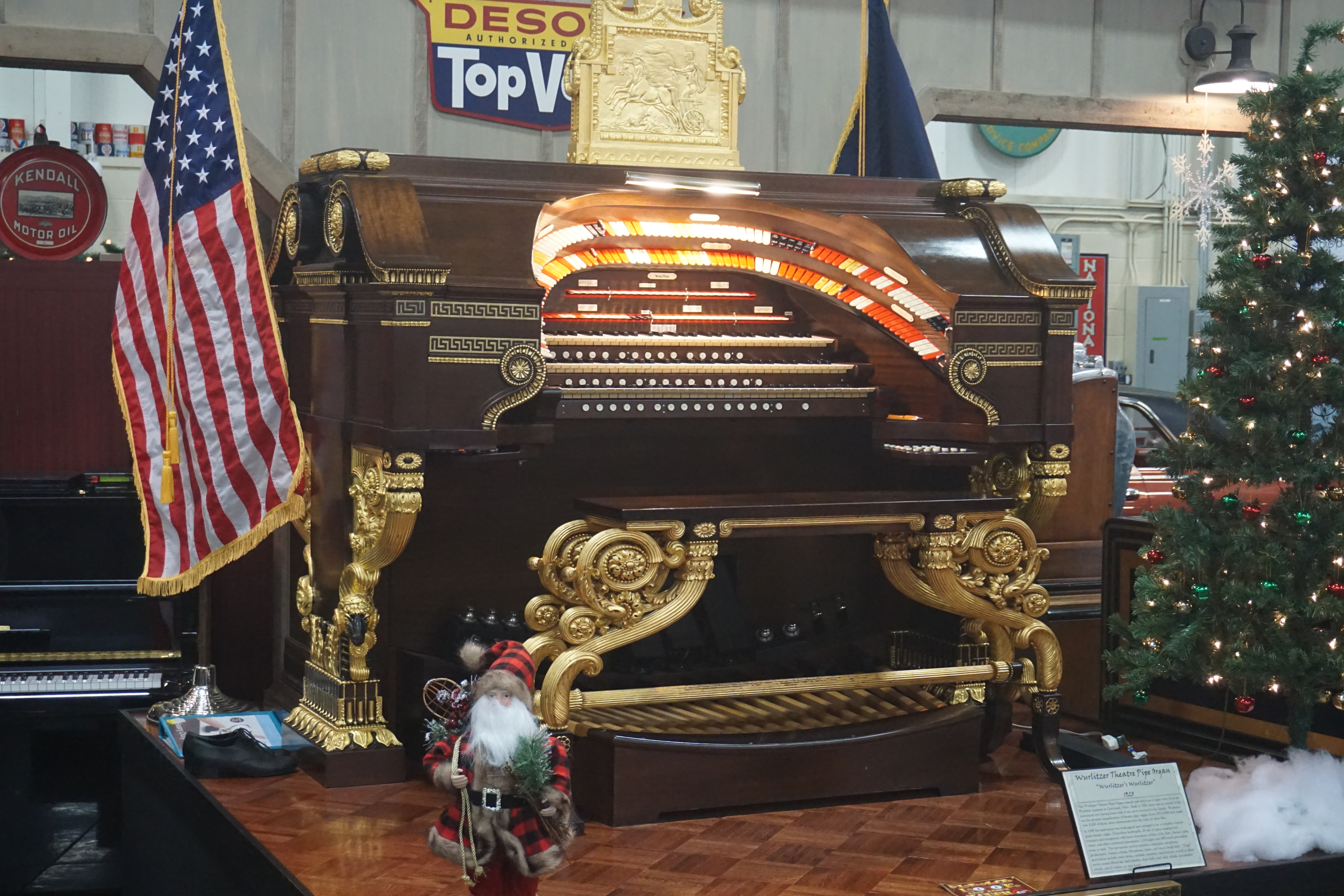
A 1923 Wurlitzer Theatre Pipe Organ at Stahls Automotive Collection

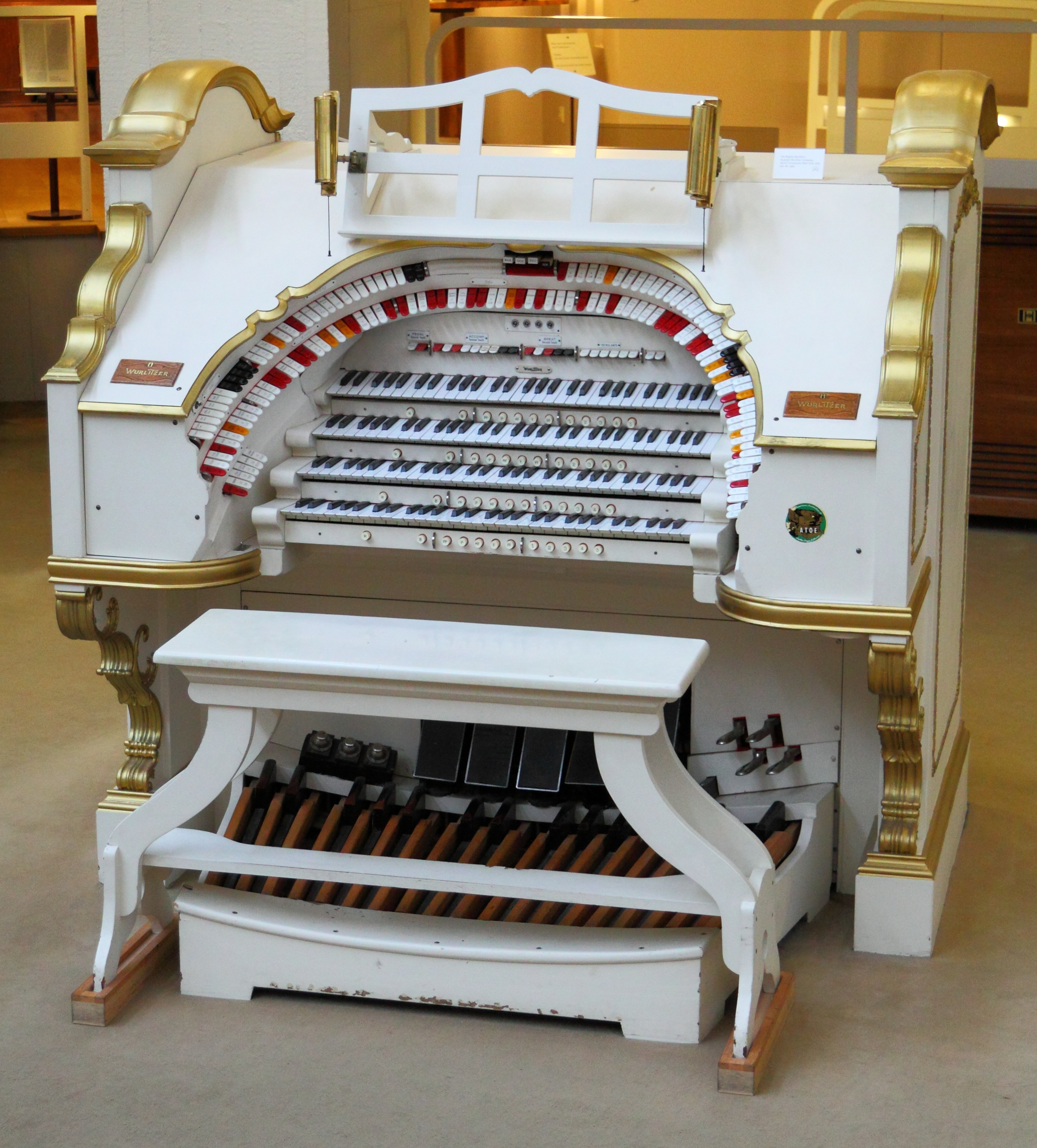
Mighty Wurlitzer type 250, Berlin Musical Instrument Museum

Perhaps the most famous instruments Wurlitzer built were its pipe organs (from 1914 until 1943), which were installed in theatres, homes, churches, and other venues. These were marketed as The Mighty Wurlitzers.

Robert Hope-Jones is considered the inventor of the theatre organ. Between 1887 and 1911 his company employed 112 workers at its peak, producing 246 organs. But shortly after merging his organ business with Wurlitzer, he committed suicide in 1914 in Rochester, New York, frustrated by his new association with the Wurlitzer company, it is said. Moving the business to their North Tonawanda Barrel Organ Factory, from 1914 to 1942, Wurlitzer built over 2,243 pipe organs: 30 times the rate of Hope-Jones company, and more theatre organs than the rest of the theatre organ manufacturers combined.

A number were shipped overseas, with the largest export market being the United Kingdom. The first of these theatre pipe organs to be shipped to the United Kingdom was dispatched from the North Tonawanda factory on 1 December 1924. It opened at its first location – The Picture House in Walsall, at the end of January 1925. This particular instrument (Britain's oldest Wurlitzer organ) is now located at the Congregational Church in Beer, Devon. Regular concerts and shows are hosted on the Beer Wurlitzer.

The largest Wurlitzer organ originally built (in terms of pipes), was the four-manual / 58-rank (set of pipes) instrument at Radio City Music Hall in New York City. The Music Hall instrument is actually a concert instrument, capable of playing a classical as well as non-classical repertoire. It, along with the organ at the Paramount Theatre in Denver Colorado are the only Wurlitzer installations still in use that have dual consoles. While Denver's is the typical "master-slave" system, Radio City is the only surviving original Wurlitzer installation to have two identical and completely independent consoles playing the same organ. Both instruments have been substantially altered in more recent years.

5-Manual theatre organ consoles are extremely rare, and only three were built by Wurlitzer:

- Opus 1351 (28 ranks), originally installed in the Michigan Theatre, in Detroit. The organ was removed in 1956 and is now installed in a private residence in Racine, Wisconsin. Six additional ranks were added, to make it a 34-rank.
- Opus 1587 (21 ranks), originally installed in the Marbro Theatre, in Chicago. It is now installed at the Providence Performing Arts Center in Rhode Island.
- Opus 1942 (21 ranks), originally installed in the Paradise Theatre, in Chicago.

In 1955, a group of enthusiasts met in the dining room of Richard Simonton, an early investor of Muzak and formed the American Theatre Organ Enthusiasts (ATOE) to preserve remaining theatre organs, including those by other builders, such as Morton, Möller, Kimball, Marr and Colton, Barton, and Kilgen. The ATOE is now known as the American Theatre Organ Society (ATOS). A similar society formed in the UK in 1952 known as the Cinema Organ Society.

=== Jukeboxes ===
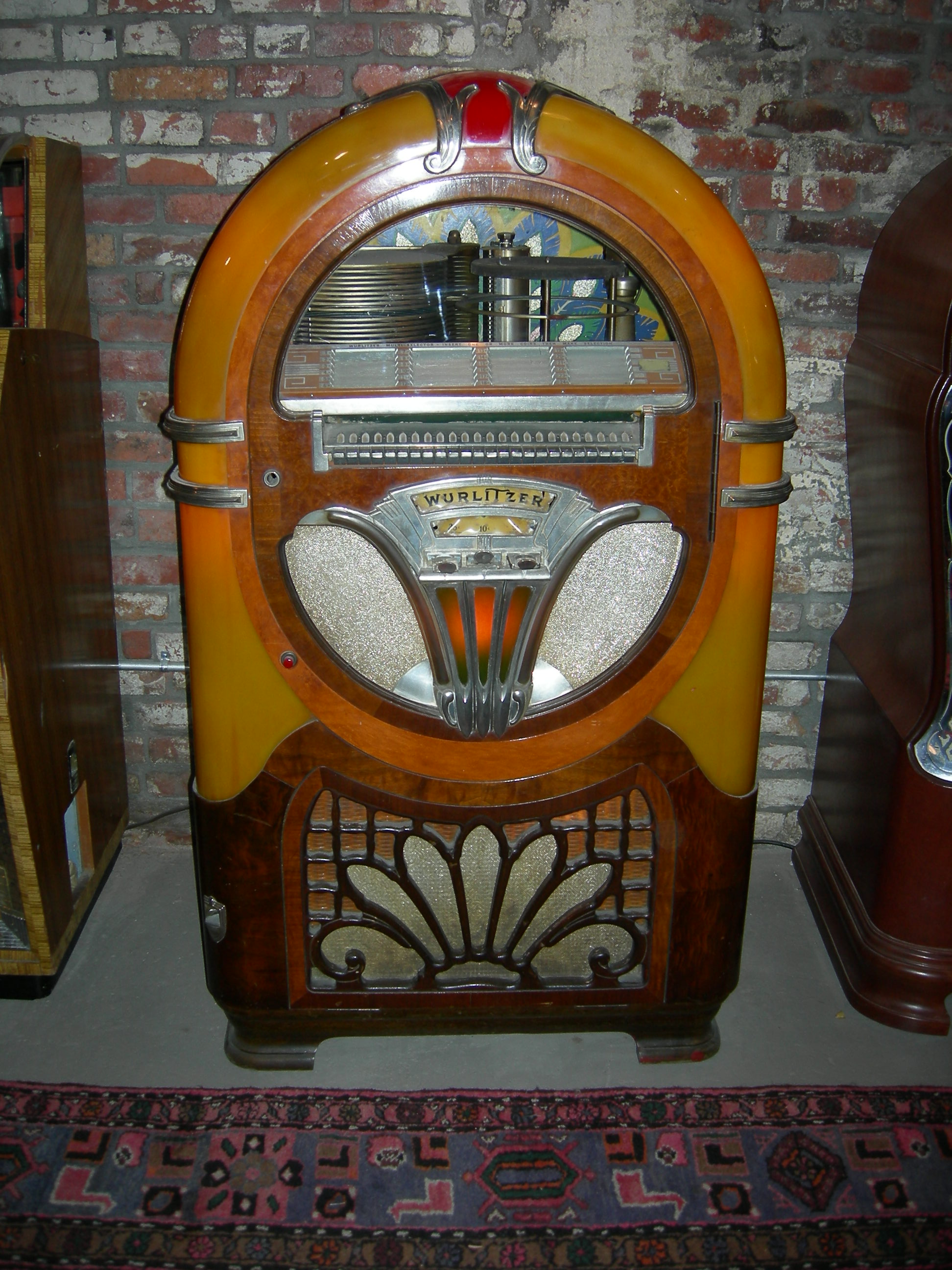
Wurlitzer 24-disc jukebox

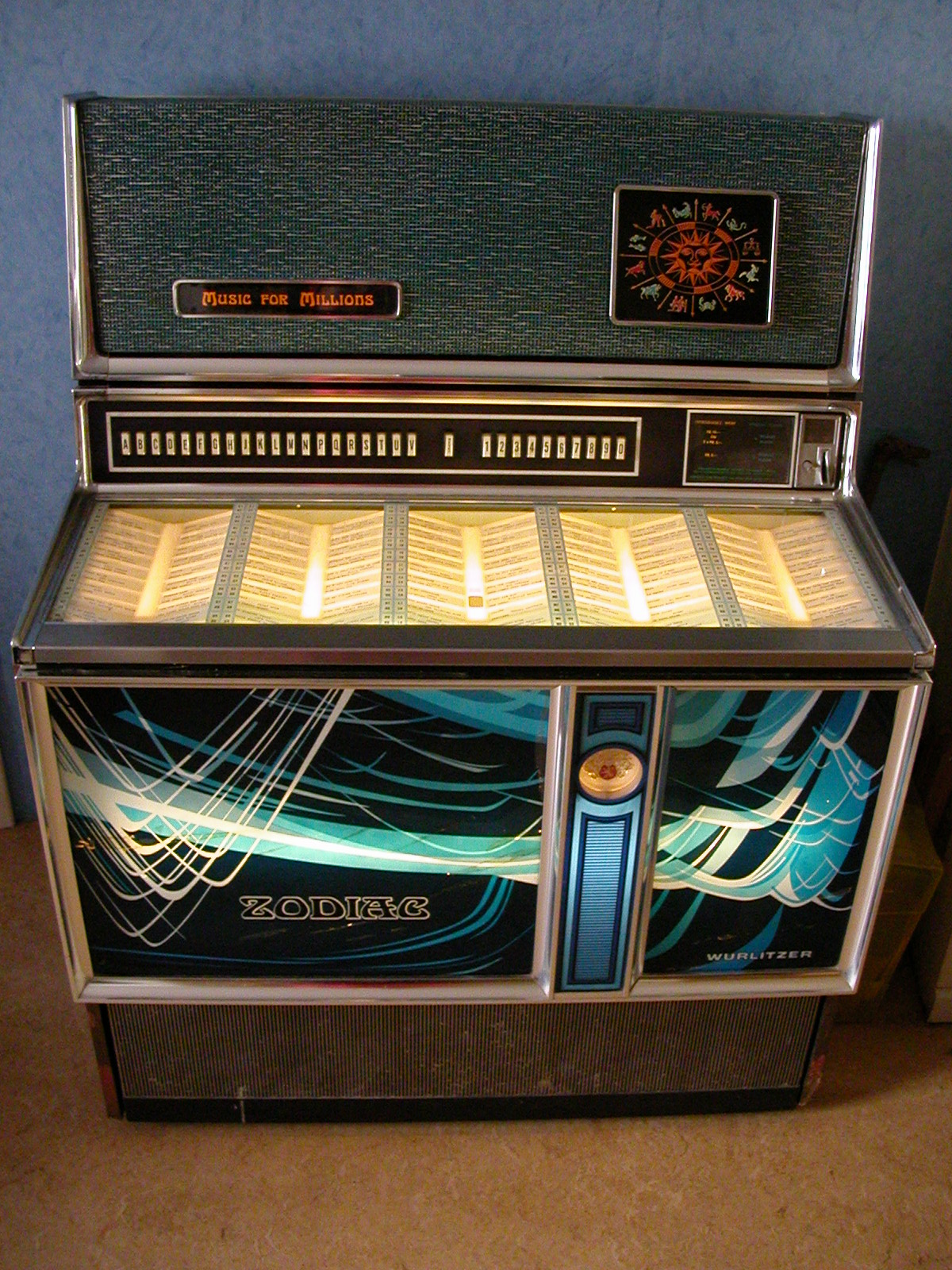
Wurlitzer 3500 jukebox (1971)

The Wurlitzer was the iconic jukebox of the Big Band era, to the extent that Wurlitzer came in some places to be a generic name for any jukebox. (In Hungarian, "wurlitzer" still means "jukebox", for example – despite Hungarian only using the letter W for words of foreign origin). Wurlitzer's success was due to a first rate marketing department (headed by future Indiana Senator Homer Capehart), the reliable Simplex record changer, and the designs of engineer Paul Fuller who created many cabinet styles in the "light-up" design idiom. Another significant factor contributing to Wurlitzer's success was the end of Prohibition in 1933 and the resulting increase in the market for coin-operated music machines in bars and dance halls.

Wurlitzer's original jukeboxes played only ten 78 rpm records, one side only, later expanded to 24. With the advent of smaller 45 rpm records, Wurlitzer was beat to the punch by Seeburg mechanisms which could play both sides of 50 different records, yielding 100 song choices. Although Wurlitzer ceded the crown of industry leader to rival Seeburg in the 1950s, Fuller's designs are so emblematic of jukeboxes in general that 1940s era Wurlitzers are often used to invoke the Rock n' Roll period in films and television. Wurlitzer struggled on for 20 years or so and made one final effort to keep its jukebox business viable with a nostalgic 1971 model called the "1050". The model did not sell well and only 1,600 units were produced. The jukebox line was sold to a German company in 1973.

Already in 1960, Wurlitzer founded a wholly owned subsidiary in Hullhorst, Germany, the DEUTSCHE WURLITZER GMBH, which was building electronic organs, vending machines, mostly cigarette vendors, and jukeboxes for the European market. Deutsche Wurlitzer was at that time a major factor in Europe for vending machines and coin-operated phonographs, the internal word for jukeboxes. In 1974, when Wurlitzer in the US ceased to build jukeboxes, Deutsche Wurlitzer continued and served the European markets and partly also the USA by own distributors. Deutsche Wurlitzer GmbH was sold in 1985 to the Australian "Nelson Group of Companies, based in Sydney, New South Wales, Australia. As it is said below Gibson Guitar Corporation bought Deutsche Wurlitzer by acquiring Baldwin Piano Company, who bought the US Wurlitzer company before. The Australian owned German company continued to manufacture vending machines and jukeboxes and was acquired by Gibson Guitar around 2008. Reason was, that the major shareholder of the Gibson Group would not like the German company to have the right to use the WURLITZER name and logo. in 2013, Deutsche Wurlitzer went out of business and the remaining part was sold to German investors. An attempt to continue with products and a new name was not successful.

Although production of Wurlitzer jukeboxes in Germany ended in 2013, the brand was reintroduced in 2024 when Sound Leisure, a British manufacturer of classic styled jukeboxes, partnered with the Wurlitzer family. The new model is an official tribute to the 1940s Wurlitzer 1015 and is available in CD, 45 rpm vinyl, and LP vinyl formats.

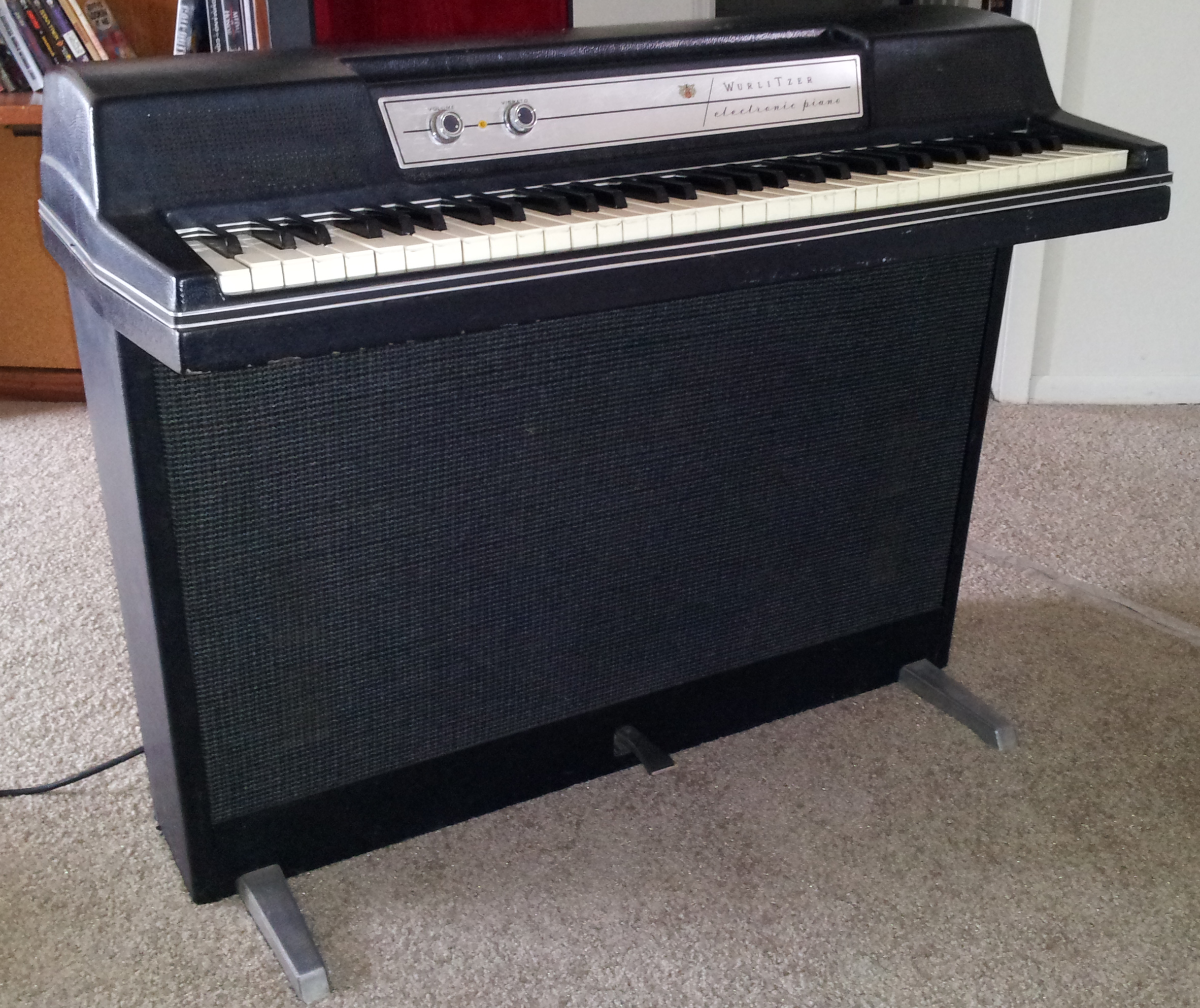
Wurlitzer 210 electric piano

=== Electric pianos ===
From 1955 to 1982, the company also produced the Wurlitzer electric piano series, an electrically amplified piano variant.

=== Electric guitars ===
In 1966, music store owner Howard Holman used his contacts at the Martin Band Instrument Company, owned by Wurlitzer at that time, to convince Wurlitzer to distribute a line of electric guitars manufactured by Holman's start-up company in Kansas. Wurlitzer became the sole distributor of guitars made by the Holman-Woodell Company of Neodesha, Kansas.

The guitar labels reflected Wurlitzer's Elkhart, Indiana, location, but with the exception of a handful of prototypes made above Holman's music store in Independence, Kansas, the guitars themselves were built in a small two-story building on Main Street in Neodesha. Three models were available: the Cougar, Wildcat and Gemini, all of which were functionally similar but featured different body shapes. The majority of the Kansas-made instruments were six-string guitars, with only a handful of basses being manufactured. Distinguishing features of the first Wurlitzer branded guitars are the W-shaped cut-out in the tremolo mounting plate and the Rock/Jazz selection rocker switch above each pick-up. Another feature of the earliest Wurlitzer electrics was that they were wired for stereo output. In 1967, Wurlitzer ceased its affiliation with the Holman-Woodell Company, possibly due to problems with the finish on Holman-Woodell guitars which resulted in many instruments being returned to the factory.

Beginning in 1967, Wurlitzer-branded guitars were manufactured by Welson in Italy, and the Wurlitzer line expanded to include semi-hollow body electric as well as acoustic guitars. Wurlitzer continued to distribute Welson-made guitars under the Wurlitzer name until 1969 when Wurlitzer stopped selling guitars under its own name.
