= Earl Valiquette =

Canadian football player

Profile
- Positions: Tackle, Guard

Personal information
- Born: June 16, 1921; Orillia, Ontario
- Died: June 18, 1975 (aged 54); Columbus, Ohio
- Listed height: 5 ft 11 in (1.80 m)
- Listed weight: 205 lb (93 kg)

Career history
- 1947–1949: Hamilton Wildcats
- 1950: Edmonton Eskimos
- 1951–1952: Hamilton Tiger-Cats

Earl J. Valiquette (June 16, 1921 – June 18, 1975) was a Canadian football player who played for the Hamilton Wildcats, Edmonton Eskimos and Hamilton Tiger-Cats. Born in Ontario, Canada, Valiquette took up football at North Tonawanda High School in New York and played semi-professionally prior to his service with the United States Navy during World War II. Upon his return from the conflict, he played for the Hamilton Wildcats for three seasons, before making a move to the Edmonton Eskimos in 1950 that was contested by his former team. He returned to Hamilton after one year and played with the newly merged Tiger-Cats for the final two seasons of his playing days. By profession, he had a career with the Carborundum Company in the United States, and was its plant manager in Logan, Ohio at the time of his death in June 1975. A local football scholarship was later established in his name.

== Early life ==
Valiquette was born in Orillia, Ontario as one of five children of Henry Valiquette and Alice LaCombe. His football career began at North Tonawanda High School in North Tonawanda, New York where, as a tackle, he received all-conference honors. Upon graduation, he played semi-professional football in the Niagara Falls area for several years before joining the United States Navy and serving in World War II in the South Pacific.

== Professional football ==
Valiquette returned to North America in 1946 and entered the Ontario Rugby Football Union (ORFU), joining the Hamilton Wildcats in 1947. Playing as a tackle and a guard, he appeared in ten regular season games in his first year with the Wildcats, winning nine and losing one, for a record of 9–1–0. This helped them reach the ORFU finals, where Hamilton lost 3–15 to the Ottawa Trojans. The following year, the Wildcats joined the Interprovincial Rugby Football Union (IRFU), but won only one of their twelve games, drawing one and losing the other ten. Nonetheless, Valiquette was nominated for the Jeff Russel Memorial Trophy, which was given annually to the best player in the IRFU, although the eventual winner that year was Eric Chipper of the Ottawa Rough Riders.

The Wildcats performed even worse the following season, losing all twelve of their games. The team then merged with the Hamilton Tigers to form the Hamilton Tiger-Cats, at which point Valiquette and his teammate Jackie Stewart signed with the Edmonton Eskimos of the Western Interprovincial Football Union. The Tiger-Cats, however, felt that Valiquette and Stewart had signed contracts with Hamilton before Edmonton, thus believing that Hamilton had the rights to both players and threatening legal action to force them remain with the Tiger-Cats. The Canadian Rugby Union eventually ruled that Edmonton had the rights to Valiquette and Stewart and, while Stewart decided to remain with the Tiger-Cats, Valiquette went to Edmonton. The Eskimos went 7–7–0 in the regular season, finishing in third place, and then went on to defeat the Saskatchewan Roughriders in the semi-finals, before losing the divisional finals to the Winnipeg Blue Bombers.

Valiquette was traded back to Hamilton the next season by Edmonton in exchange for George Festeryga. In 1951 the Tiger-Cats finished at the top of their division in regular season play, with a record of 7–5–0, defeating the Toronto Argonauts in the semi-finals, but ultimately losing the divisional finals to the Ottawa Rough Riders. In 1952, Valiquette's last season in professional football, the Tiger-Cats again finished first in regular play, with a record of 9–2–1, but lost the final to the Argonauts. During his playing career, Valiquette stood 5 feet, 11 inches (180 centimeters) and weighed 205 pounds (93 kilograms).

== Later life ==
Valiquette had joined the Carborundum Company in Niagara Falls, New York in 1941 and advanced through the company over the next three decades. His earlier positions gave him the flexibility of working professionally at the same time that he was developing his football career. He eventually moved to Logan, Ohio and reached the post of that city's plant manager in May 1969. He was active in his local community as a member of the Kiwanis, and served on the board of directors of the Logan Trade Club prior to his death. He also remained athletically active in golf.

Valiquette was still employed as the Logan plant's manager at the time of his death on June 18, 1975, in Columbus, Ohio, at the age of 54, after being in poor health for a number of months. Earlier in the year he had accepted his company's "Outstanding Chapter Award" among 16 management clubs for his plant's "considerable achievements in civic activities, programming, attendance and membership activity." Valiquette was survived by his wife, Alda, one son, James, three daughters, Kathleen, Jo Ann, and Judith, and his mother. His funeral was held on June 23 and he was buried in Mount Olivet Cemetery in Kenmore, New York. A few months after his death, his employer announced the establishment of the $250 Earl J. Valiquette Memorial Scholarship, which was to be given annually in support of the financial needs of a Logan High School football senior. The prize was first awarded in May 1976. Valiquette was also a member of the Hamilton Hall of Fame.
