= Rattletrap =

Rattlettrap may refer to:

- "Death Sex Rattletrap" (1989), a song by Chainsaw Kittens, an alternative rock band
- Richard Hudson Rattletrap, a character in The Disappointment, one of the first American operas, it was to have been performed on 20 April 1762 in Philadelphia
- Rattletrap (Transformers) - a fictional character.
- Slang for a decrepit car
