= Eugene de Kleist =

German organ builder (1853–1911)

Baron Frederick Joseph Eugene de Kleist (18 January 1853 – 1911), was a pioneering German organ builder, who in founding the North Tonawanda Barrel Organ Factory, started the American style of Band organs.

Eugene de Kleist was born in Düsseldorf on 18 January 1853, the son of Baron Ewald and his Belgium-born wife Charlotte de Kleist (née Heyden). At the end of his formal schooling, he joined the Prussian Army, and fought in the Franco-Prussian War. After the end of hostilities, he trained as a barrel organ builder with the French company Limonaire Frères, in the Black Forest town of Waldkirch.

In 1880, De Kleist moved to London, England, where he started his own organ building business. Almost from the start of its foundation, De Kleist built contacts in the United States, and commuted regularly across the Atlantic Ocean. After the United States Government announced the imposition of import tariffs from 1893 on new organs, he was pursued by Allan Herschell, to persuade him to set up in business in the United States, and hence supply the various fairground ride manufacturers with locally made European quality barrel organs.

In 1892 De Kleist liquidated his London business and moved to the then unincorporated village of North Tonawanda, New York, backed by Allan Herschell and hence close to his Herschell Armitage Company factory. The location had developed a reputation as an excellent site for those reliant on the lumber trade, and easy access to all of North America via its excellent transport links. De Kleist established the North Tonawanda Barrel Organ Factory, and began producing organs suitable for a variety of fairground rides. As parts were not subject to the import tariffs, many of his early organs were built from parts imported from the French and German factories of his old employer, Limonaire Frères.

As production grew, De Kleist approached other musical instrument manufacturers to create new instruments under their brands. One of these companies was the Wurlitzer company of Cincinnati, Ohio. Wurlitzer said no to buying any of De Kleist's existing barrel-organ based products, but said that they would buy a coin-operated piano. As development of the Wurlitzer Tonophone progressed, in 1897 the business name was changed to the DeKleist Musical Instrument Manufacturing Company, after De Kleist agreed to sell the company’s products exclusively to Wurlitzer.

The Tonophone brought about a commercial agreement between De Kleist and Wurlitizer, cemented in 1901 after Allan Herschell left the Herschell Armitage Company due to financial complications. This allowed De Kleist to buy Herschell Armitage out, and seek new investment from his association with Wurlitzer.

Having been voted in previously as president of the Common Council of North Tonawanda, in November 1906 he was elected Mayor of the city for a term of two years. Wurlitzer resultantly bought him out of the organ building business in 1908, renaming it the Rudolph Wurlitzer Company of North Tonawanda.

After his term as mayor ended, and suffering from ill health, De Kleist retired with his wife Charlotte (née Chelius) to Berlin in 1911, dying in Biarritz, France in 1913 from a heart attack. He left his only son, August, and two daughters, who had chosen to remain in the United States.
