= Buffalo Public Schools abuse reporting controversy =

Viral controversy about child safety in Buffalo Public Schools

In 2025, the school district of Buffalo, New York, Buffalo Public Schools, came under fire as allegations were made that they were covering up and obstructing investigations into child abuse and sexual abuse within the district. These allegations came from Richard Hy, a YouTuber and special victims unit detective for the Buffalo Police Department, whose allegations on the Unsubscribe podcast went viral online. The school board initially denied the allegations and hired a private law firm as an independent investigator. With limited access to documents and individuals, the investigation found that while the district had not intentionally obstructed investigations, its actions were the result of systemic failures in communications and policies by the school district.

== Background ==
=== Buffalo Public Schools ===
Buffalo Public Schools is the government body responsible for managing public education in the city of Buffalo, located in Erie County of western New York. In the 2024-2025 school year, over 30,000 students attended one of 60 public schools within the district. At the time of the controversy, the school district did not have a signed school resource officer agreement with the Buffalo Police Department, despite the school board passing a resolution calling to move forward on such an agreement in December 2024. The 2 agencies instead worked together in what was described as a "handshake deal several administrations ago". The only published protocol by the school district on police interaction was a 2024-2025 emergency handbook. Sources also told WGRZ that payments to BPD for SRO services were often late for as long as years. Prior to the controversy in July 2023, an elementary school principal had been placed on administrative leave after being accused of bullying and sexually abusing a student.

=== Richard Hy ===
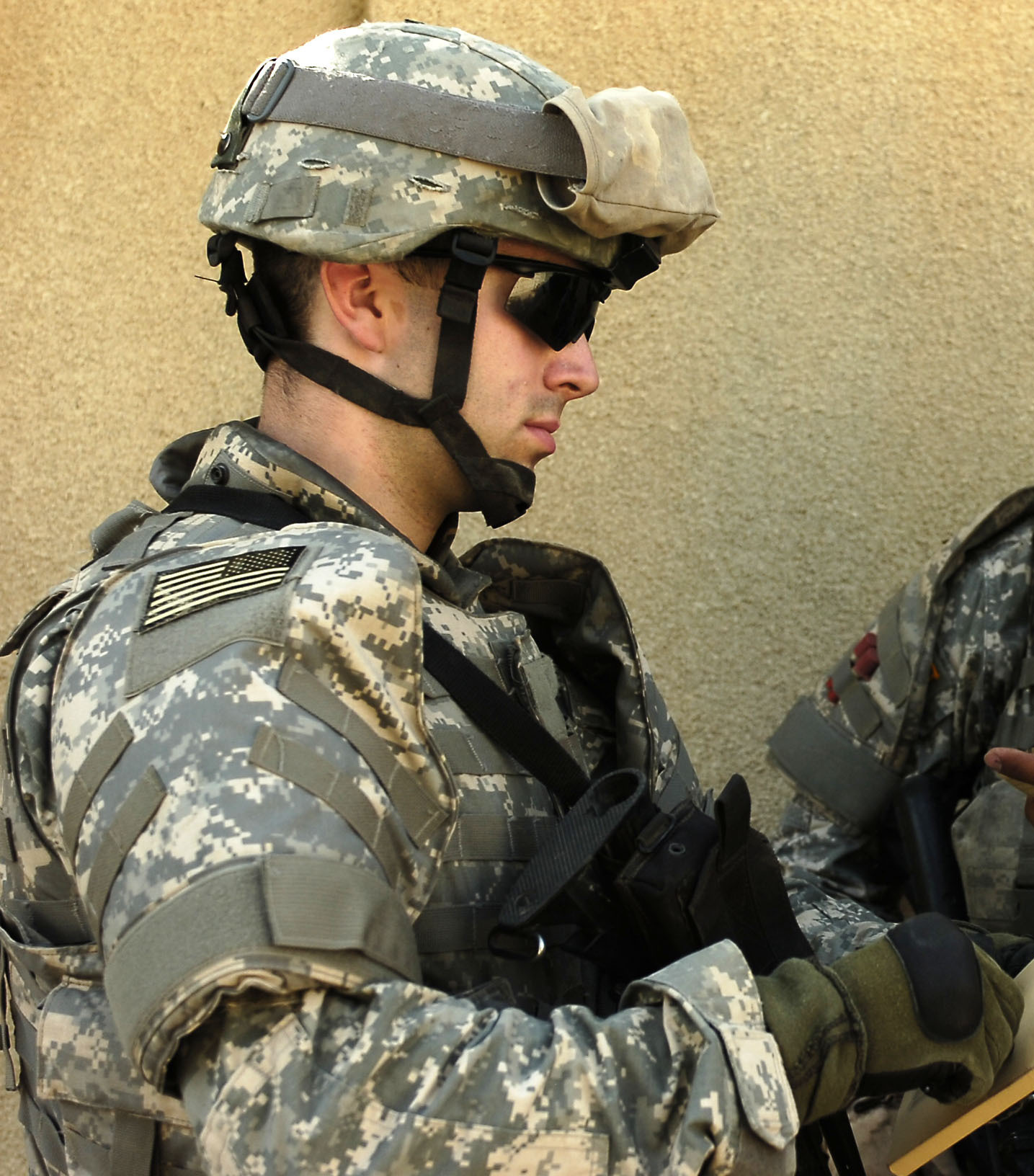
Hy during a military deployment in 2006, prior to his employment as a police officer.

Richard Hy is a Special Victims Unit detective for the Buffalo Police Department who had been working for the department since 2012. During his time as a police officer, Hy would begin posting videos to Vine then YouTube about law enforcement and military-related commentary and comedy under the handle Angry Cops. Hy had been promoted to the rank of lieutenant in 2023 before returning to the position of detective at some point prior to September 2024.

Hy's history with the Buffalo Police Department has been highly controversial, having a long history of misconduct reports. By February 2022, he had been subject to 23 internal affairs investigations over on- and off-duty behavior and found to have been acting in misconduct on 3 different occasions by the New York State Attorney's Law Enforcement Misconduct Investigation Office. The resulting investigation recommended that BPD should create a plan to monitor Hy's conduct and impose consequences for any in the future. WKBW-TV also reported in 2023 that Hy was listed on the Brady list of the Erie County District Attorney's Office. Hy has alleged that his social media platform had stunted his career growth, where his use of social media had resulted in 2 suspensions from the department.

=== Attempted kidnapping incident ===
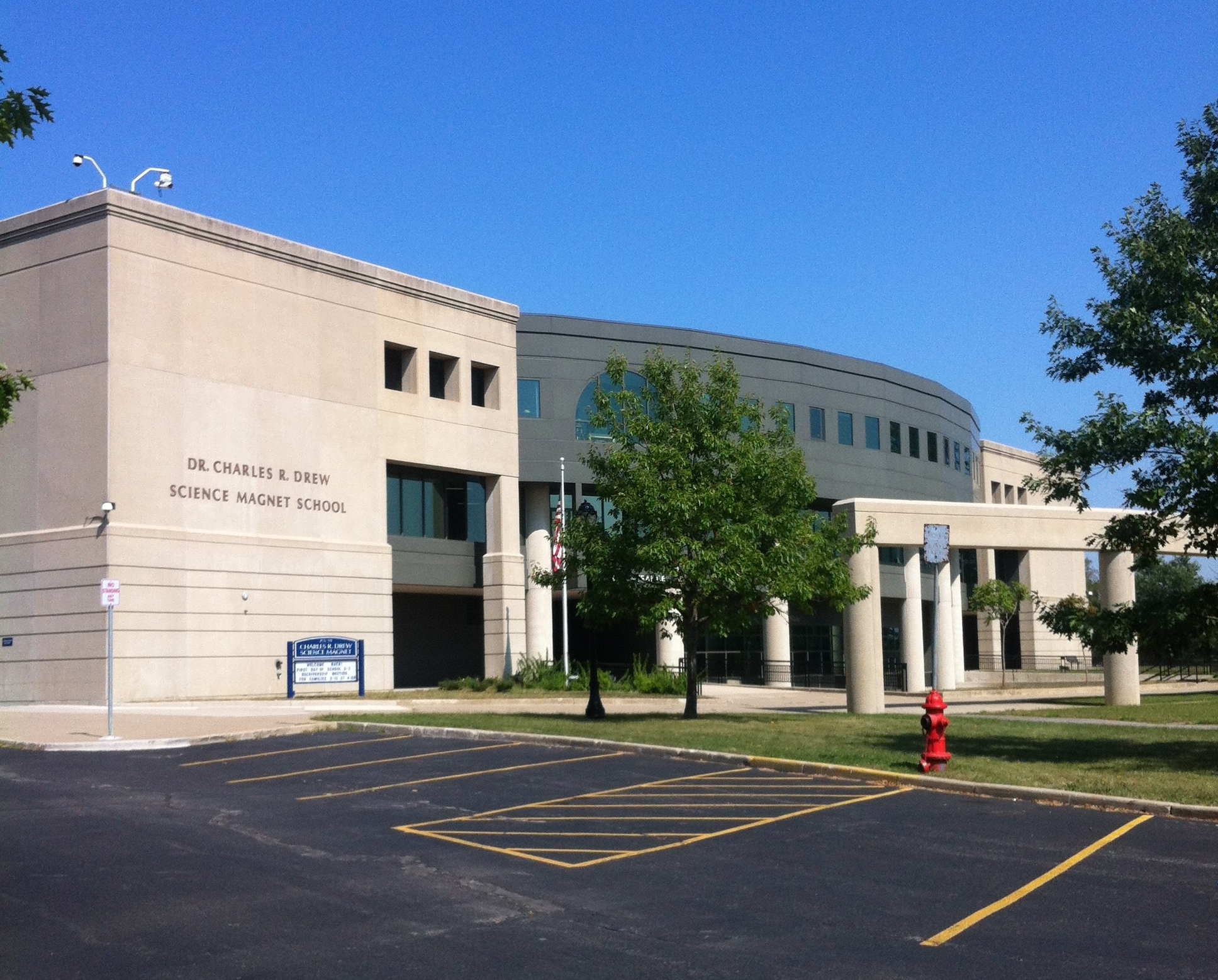
Dr. Charles R. Drew Science Magnet School, where Cronin attempted to kidnap at least one student.

In February 2025, 30-year-old Illinois man Shane Cronin entered Dr. Charles R. Drew Science Magnet School without authorization, approached two students, and attempted to lure and kidnap one of them. After a school employee noticed Cronin and asked him to leave, Cronin subsequently punched and shoved the employee to the ground. He would be arrested and charged with one count of attempted kidnapping, among other crimes, in early May 2025. Cronin would plead not guilty to the charges and would be held without bail.

== Allegations ==
External videos
- Podcasts featuring Hy and his allegations
- Your Kids Are In Danger - SVU Detective Exposes Buffalo School System
- PROOF Buffalo Schools Are Covering Up Child Abuse & Obstructing Justice Part 1
- ALARMING PROOF: Buffalo Schools EXPOSED For Hiding Child Abuse Evidence | Unsubscribe Podcast Ep 214
- ‘Angry Cops’ Richard Hy: Exposes Child Abuse Cover-Ups | BRCC #344

On April 26, 2025, on the Unsubscribe podcast, Hy alleged that the Buffalo Public Schools district had covered up and refused to work with law enforcement in cases of child abuse and sexual assaults, particularly sexual assaults between students. He also stated that Buffalo Public Schools officials and attorneys had obstructed evidence and ignored subpoenas and court orders to cover up child abuse and sexual abuse within the district. This information was released in a YouTube video entitled "Your Kids Are In Danger - SVU Detective Exposes Buffalo School System", which had over 1 million views by April 29, 2025. Hy stated that the Erie County District Attorney's office and his superiors were also frustrated, to which they replied with no comment on concerns about compromising ongoing investigations. Hy provided examples in his allegations, including an incident in which he alleged an investigation he undertook which involved a child who had told her counselor that she was being physically abused and did not report the abuse until the child showed up to school with bruises, despite being a mandated reporter.

Hy's allegations also referenced Cronin's attempted kidnapping, who would be charged for his crimes shortly after Hy's allegations in May 2025. Though Cronin was only charged with one count of attempted kidnapping, Hy further alleged that a Cronin had attempted to kidnap a second student and that the school did not notify the student's parents. Hy also alleged that the school deleted surveillance footage of the incident, and both the footage and in turn the second student was discovered through a school employee who was able to pass the deleted footage to the district attorney. Cronin would later plead guilty to his charges and was sentenced to 5 years in state prison followed by 5 years of supervised release.

Buffalo Public Schools responded to Hy by stating it was "prepared to vigorously address these untruths." The Buffalo Police Benevolent Association, the police union for the Buffalo Police Department, released a statement backing Hy and his claims. The Erie County District Attorney's Office and the Buffalo Police Department acknowledged Hy's allegations but declined to comment in order to maintain the integrity of their investigations.

In May 2025, Hy appeared on the Unsubscribe podcast again, and stated that an alleged rape of a student had been improperly handled by multiple teachers. He further alleged on the Black Rifle Coffee Podcast that teachers and school aides used school bathrooms as "time-out" rooms for students, claiming that the lights would be turned off and an adult would put their foot against the door to prevent them from leaving.

== Investigation ==
In June 2025, the School Board unanimously selected the Buffalo-based law firm Rupp Pfalzgraf LLC from a pool of 14 applying firms to conduct an independent investigation into Hy's allegations. 66 individuals were interviewed as part of the investigation according to Rupp Pfalzgraf and the school district. A representative for Rupp Pfalzgraf stated that they did not have access to all related documents or individuals as they would have required the ability to issue subpoenas in order to obtain them.

In February 2026, Rupp Pfalzgraf released their report, containing several redactions with the purpose of maintaining student privacy. The report stated that while the investigators did not find evidence of coverups or obstruction, they did find "systemic challenges requiring attention, including communication protocols, evidence-preservation procedures, training, and coordination between schools and law enforcement and related entities." The report specifically found instances of bad communication and reporting in connection with evidence not received by Hy as part of a sexual assault case, a failure to enter a lockdown instead of a shelter-in-place procedure during the kidnapping incident involving Cronin, and lack of staff training after a teacher accidentally gave a student candy laced with THC and the responding school resource officer reportedly resisted EMTs attempting to take the student to receive further medical attention. In spite of the lack of evidence of any coverups, a representative for Rupp Pfalzgraf stated "there is some validity to what [Hy] said."

=== Responses ===
Buffalo Public Schools encouraged members of the public to read the report. They also stated that the school board was in the process of evaluating and prioritizing the recommendations made in it. Two school board members promised families that changes would be made to district safety protocols.

The report was criticized by parents for lacking new information. Edward Speidel, President of the District Parent Coordinating Council, criticized the amount of material hidden under redactions which spanned up to entire pages and further claimed that teachers regularly contacted his organization in confidence to report misconduct. He was happy, however, that the allegations were being acknowledged by the district.

At the school board meeting following the release of the report, the report was not a topic on the agenda and was not discussed outside of one teacher in attendance who brought it up as an issue. When subsequently asked by WGRZ, the district stated that changes were being made but would likely not be discussed publicly to maintain school safety and protocols.
