= Tonio di Paolo =

American opera singer

Tonio di Paolo is an American opera singer. He began his career in the 1970s as a baritone but since the late 1970s has portrayed roles as a leading tenor. His performance credits include appearances with the Metropolitan Opera, the Lyric Opera of Chicago, the San Francisco Opera, the Houston Grand Opera, the Canadian Opera Company, and the Hamburg State Opera among other companies. He has created roles in the world premieres of operas by composers Samuel Adler, David Carlson, John Harbison, and Augusta Read Thomas. He retired from the stage in 2010.

== Life and career ==
Born in North Tonawanda, New York, di Paolo is the son of Lynne and Frank di Paolo. As a child he attended Colonel Payne Elementary School, Al Payne Avenue Junior High, and North Tonawanda High School. He was highly influenced by the music teachers at these schools, and by the musicians at his family church; the Ascension Roman Catholic Church in North Tonawanda. He studied at the Eastman School of Music. He also participated in masterclasses with Luciano Pavarotti at the Juilliard School.

In 1976 di Paolo made his New York City performance debut in Conrad Susa's Transformations with the Manhattan Theatre Club. That same year he created the role of Meanwell in the world premiere of Samuel Adler's The Disappointment at the Library of Congress. On 18 November 1976 he portrayed Henri de Valois in the United States premiere of Emmanuel Chabrier's Le roi malgré lui with the Juilliard Opera. In 1979 he created the role of Florizel in the world premiere of John Harbison's Winter's Tale at the San Francisco Opera.

In 1980 di Paolo was the tenor soloist in the Faure Requiem at Carnegie Hall with the New York Choral Society under conductor Robert De Cormier. In 1981 he was the tenor soloist in Gian Carlo Menotti's Missa 'O Pulchritudo with the Westminster Cathedral Choir, the Charleston Symphony Orchestra, and conductor Joseph Flummerfelt at the Spoleto Festival USA. In 1982 he portrayed Beppe in Pagliacci at the Houston Grand Opera and made his debut at the Lyric Opera of Chicago as Aldred in Die Fledermaus. In 1983 he appeared at the Connecticut Opera as the Duke of Mantua in Rigoletto, and sang as Nemorino in L'elisir d'amore at the Washington National Opera.

In 1984 di Paolo appeared as Rodolfo in La bohème at the Canadian Opera Company. That same year he sang Nemerino again for his debut with the Seattle Opera. He returned to Seattle several more times during the 1980s for performances of Rodolfo (1985), Edgardo di Ravenswood in Lucia di Lammermoor (1986), and the Duke of Mantua (1988). He returned to the Lyric Opera of Chicago in 1986 to portray Edgardo di Ravenswood to Edita Gruberova's Lucia. In 1987 he performed the title role in Pietro Mascagni's L'amico Fritz at the John F. Kennedy Center for the Performing Arts. In 1988 he made his debut at the Hamburg State Opera as Rodolfo. In 1989 he portrayed Romeo in Roméo et Juliette at the Tulsa Opera, sang Rodolfo to Ilona Tokody's Mimi with the Opera Company of Boston under conductor Sarah Caldwell, and was the tenor soloist in the Verdi Requiem with the London Symphony Orchestra.

In 1990 di Paolo made his debut at the Metropolitan Opera as Alfred in Die fledermaus. In 1991 he portrayed Cavaradossi to Diana Soviero's Tosca at the Opéra de Montréal. In 1992 he returned to Chicago to portray Riccardo in Verdi's Un ballo in maschera. In 1994 he created the role of Edgar Allan Poe in the world premiere of Augusta Read Thomas's Ligeia at the Evian Festival. In 1996 he portrayed Adam in the world premiere of David Carlson's Dreamkeepers with the Utah Opera. In 1998 he performed the role of Mario Cavaradossi in Puccini's Tosca at the Minnesota Opera and portrayed the title role in Gounod's Faust at the Calgary Opera. In 1999 he performed the role of Radames in Aida at the Arizona Opera.

In 2000 di Paolo was the featured soloist in a concert with the Baltimore Symphony Orchestra. In 2001 he portrayed the title role in Don Carlos and the Duke of Mantua at the Arizona Opera and Canio in Pagliacci at the Minnesota Opera. In 2002 he performed the role of Don Jose in Carmen at the Central City Opera. In 2003 he portrayed Calaf in Turandot at the Austin Lyric Opera and Radames at the Atlanta Opera. In 2004 he appeared at the Utah Opera as Dick Johnson in Puccini's La fanciulla del West. He reprised the role of Canio in 2009 at the Sugar Creek Opera and Opera Omaha. He retired in 2010.
