= North Tonawanda High School =

Public, coeducational school in North Tonawanda, New York, USA

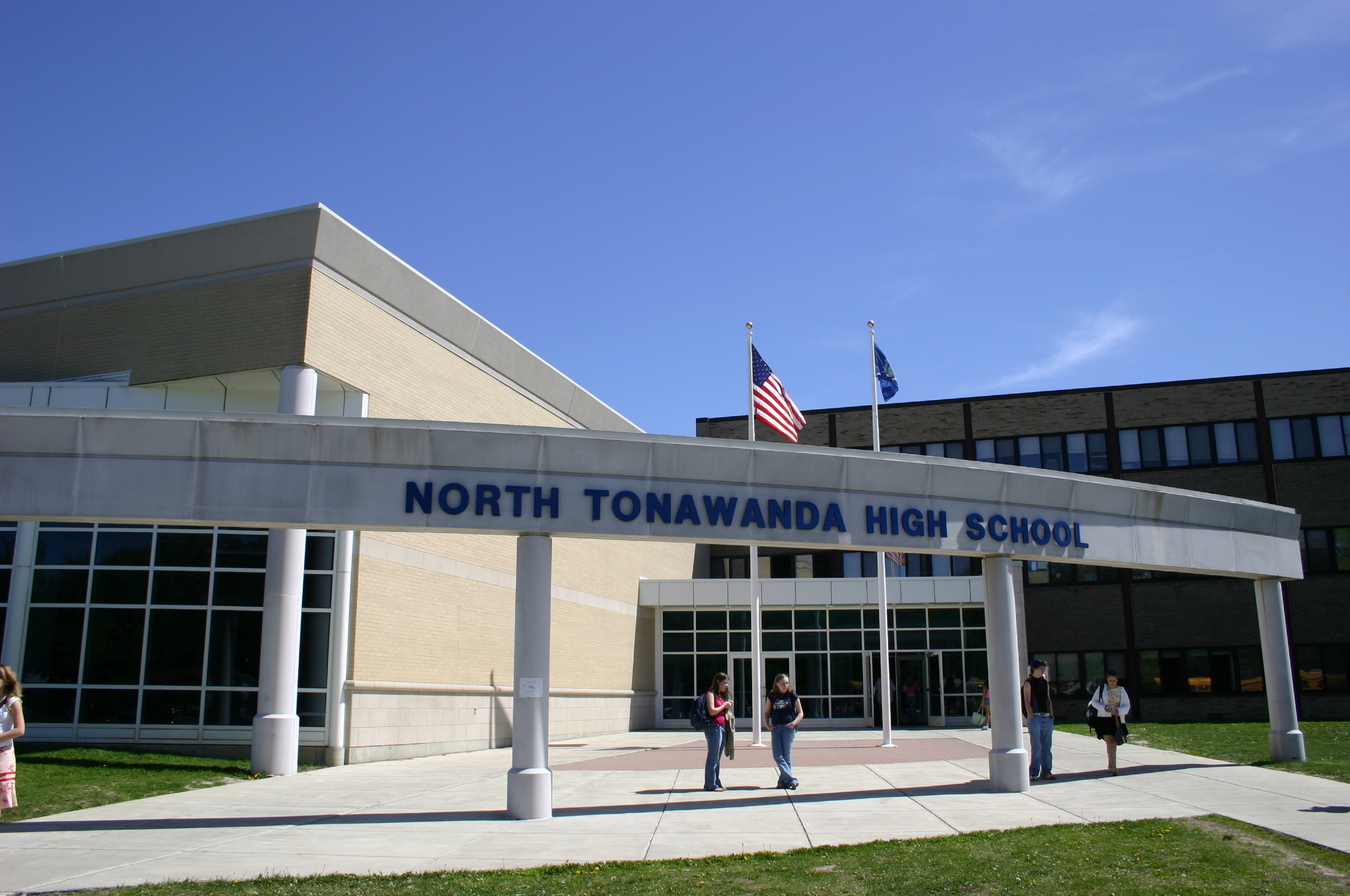

Location
- 405 Meadow Drive; North Tonawanda, (Niagara County), New York 14120; USA; 43.050764°N 78.870764°W

Information
- Type: Public, Coeducational
- School board: North Tonawanda School Board
- School district: North Tonawanda City School District
- NCES District ID: 3621240
- Superintendent: Jeff Jachkewski
- CEEB code: 334-230
- NCES School ID: 4009000100115
- Principal: Bradley Rowles
- Teaching staff: 86.63 (FTE)
- Grades: 9-12
- Student to teacher ratio: 11.23
- Colors: Red and Blue
- Athletics conference: Section VI
- Mascot: Lumberjack
- Newspaper: The Horizon
- Yearbook: North Star
- Feeder schools: North Tonawanda Middle School
- Website: North Tonawanda High School

North Tonawanda High School (NTHS) is a public high school located in North Tonawanda, New York. N.T.H.S. is the high school for the North Tonawanda City School District. The current principal is Bradley Rowles.

== Academics ==
=== Academies ===
North Tonawanda High School houses five smaller career academies: The Academy of Business and Finance, The Academy of Engineering & Architecture, the Academy of Information Technology, the Academy of International Studies, and the Academy of Health Science. Each academy accepts around twenty new students each school year, wherein each student takes a track of classes within that discipline to prepare students for further exploration of that career strand in college.

== History ==
North Tonawanda High School was built in 1962. The building opened on September 5, 1962 and was dedicated on October 14, 1962.

=== Selected former principals ===
Previous assignment and reason for departure denoted in parentheses

- George L. Lowry–1927-1962 (Teacher - North Tonawanda High School, named Principal of North Tonawanda Junior High)
- Earl Fonner–1962-1972 (Assistant Principal - North Tonawanda High School, retired)
- B. Frank Sheppard–?-1979 (Assistant Principal - North Tonawanda Middle School, retired)
- John T. Mahoney–1979-1987 (Principal - Perry Junior/Senior High School, resigned)
- Joseph Burruano–1987-1990 (Principal - Payne Junior High School, retired)
- Martin R. Heavey, Jr.–1990-1993 (House II Principal - Orchard Park High School, named Principal of Cleveland Hill High School)
- Franklin D. Ruggiero–1993-1999 (Principal - Jefferson Middle School, died)
- Albert J. Almansberger–1999-2005 (Principal - Keshequa Junior-Senior High School, retired)

James Fisher (retired 2022)

== Notable alumni, teachers and coaches ==
- Maryalice Demler, television news anchor
- Tonio di Paolo, opera singer
- Jill Krowinski, politician
- Stan Rojek, baseball player
- Roman Piskor, American football player
- John Olszowka, historian
- Earl Valiquette, Canadian football player
- Richard Hy, police officer and YouTuber known as Angry Cops
