= Roman Piskor =

American football player (1917–1981)

- Piskor in 1946 while with the Yankees

No. 41, 45
- Position: Tackle

Personal information
- Born: August 9, 1917; North Tonawanda, New York, U.S.
- Died: August 1981 (aged 63–64); Niagara, New York, U.S.
- Listed height: 6 ft 0 in (1.83 m)
- Listed weight: 245 lb (111 kg)

Career information
- High school: North Tonawanda
- College: Niagara University

Career history
- New York Yankees (1946); Cleveland Browns (1947); Chicago Rockets (1948)

Awards and highlights
- AAFC champion (1947)

Career statistics
- Games: 34
- Stats at Pro Football Reference

Roman John "Ray" Piskor (August 19, 1917 – August 1981) was an American football tackle who played three seasons in the All-America Football Conference (AAFC) between 1946 and 1948. Piskor played for the New York Yankees, Cleveland Browns and the Chicago Rockets. Piskor grew up in North Tonawanda, New York and attended Niagara University, where he was a star lineman. After several years in the Army Air Force during World War II, he was signed by the Yankees in 1946. Piskor was traded to the Browns the following year, when the team won the AAFC championship. He spent a final season with the Rockets in 1948.

== High school and college career ==
Piskor attended North Tonawanda High School in North Tonawanda, New York. He enrolled at Niagara University in 1938 and was a star lineman on the school's football team. Piskor joined the Army Air Force in July 1942 during World War II and did his basic training in Atlantic City, New Jersey. Piskor was a member of an Eastern All-Army team coached by Robert Neyland in 1942. He later transferred to a base in Greensboro, North Carolina and played for its Tech Hawks football team. He went to fight overseas in 1944 with the Third Air Force.

== Professional career ==
After his discharge from the Air Force, Piskor joined the New York Yankees of the All-America Football Conference (AAFC) in 1946. The Yankees finished the year with a 10–3–1 win-loss-tie record and faced the Cleveland Browns in the AAFC championship. The Yankees lost the game 14–9. Piskor, who worked for the Yankees as an accountant in the offseason, was sent to the Buffalo Bills in 1947 and then traded to the Browns for John Duda and Jack Carpenter. Cleveland finished the season with a 12–1–1 record and won the AAFC championship, beating the Yankees in the title game for the second year in a row. Piskor was sent to the Chicago Rockets in 1948 as part of a league-led effort to balance out talent among the AAFC's teams. He spent one season with the Rockets before retiring from professional football.
