= Yankee Doodle =

Patriotic Anglo-American song

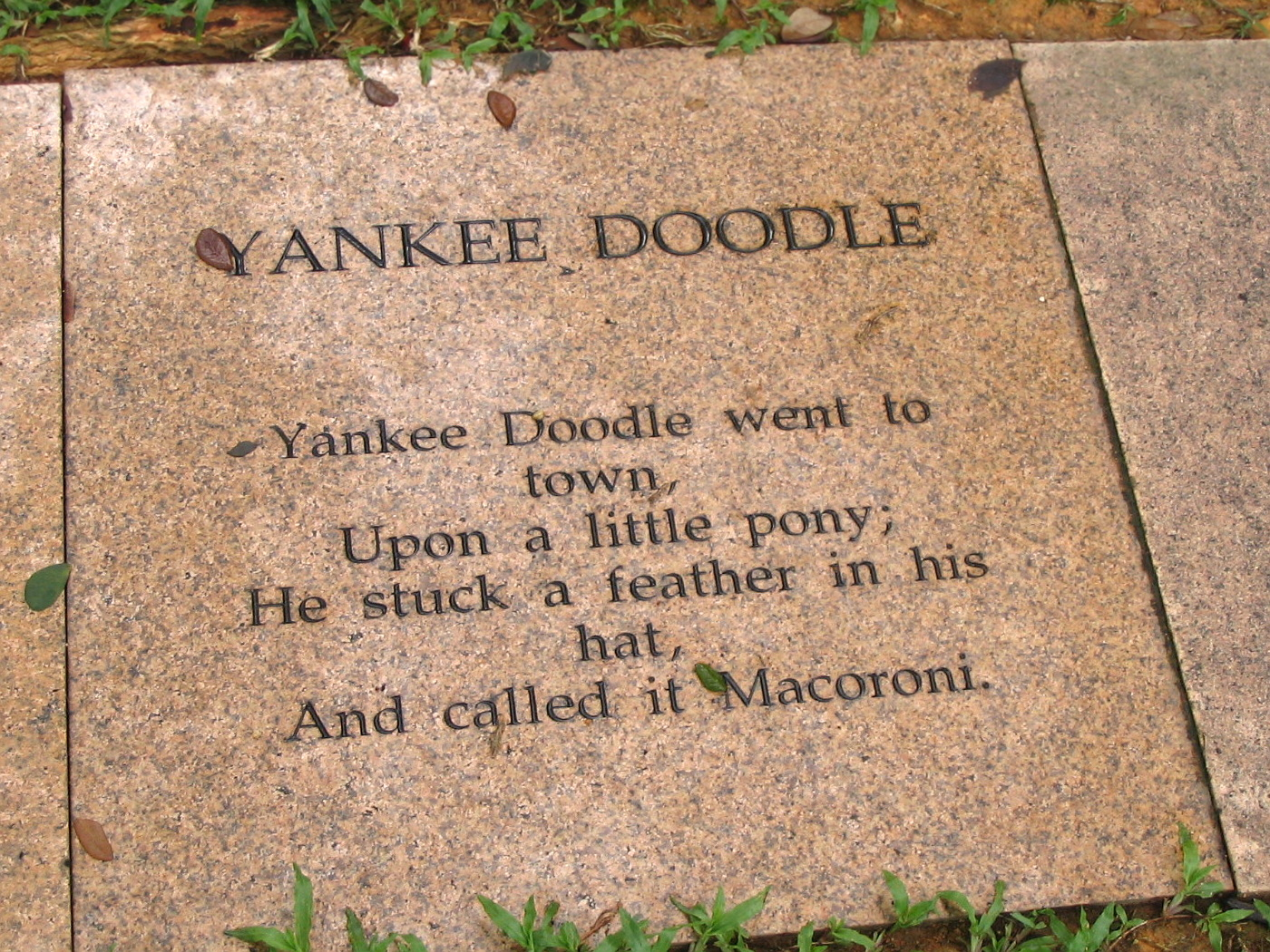
- The first verse and refrain of "Yankee Doodle", engraved on the footpath in a park

Song
- Published: c. 1756
- Lyricists: Richard Shuckburgh, Edward Bangs

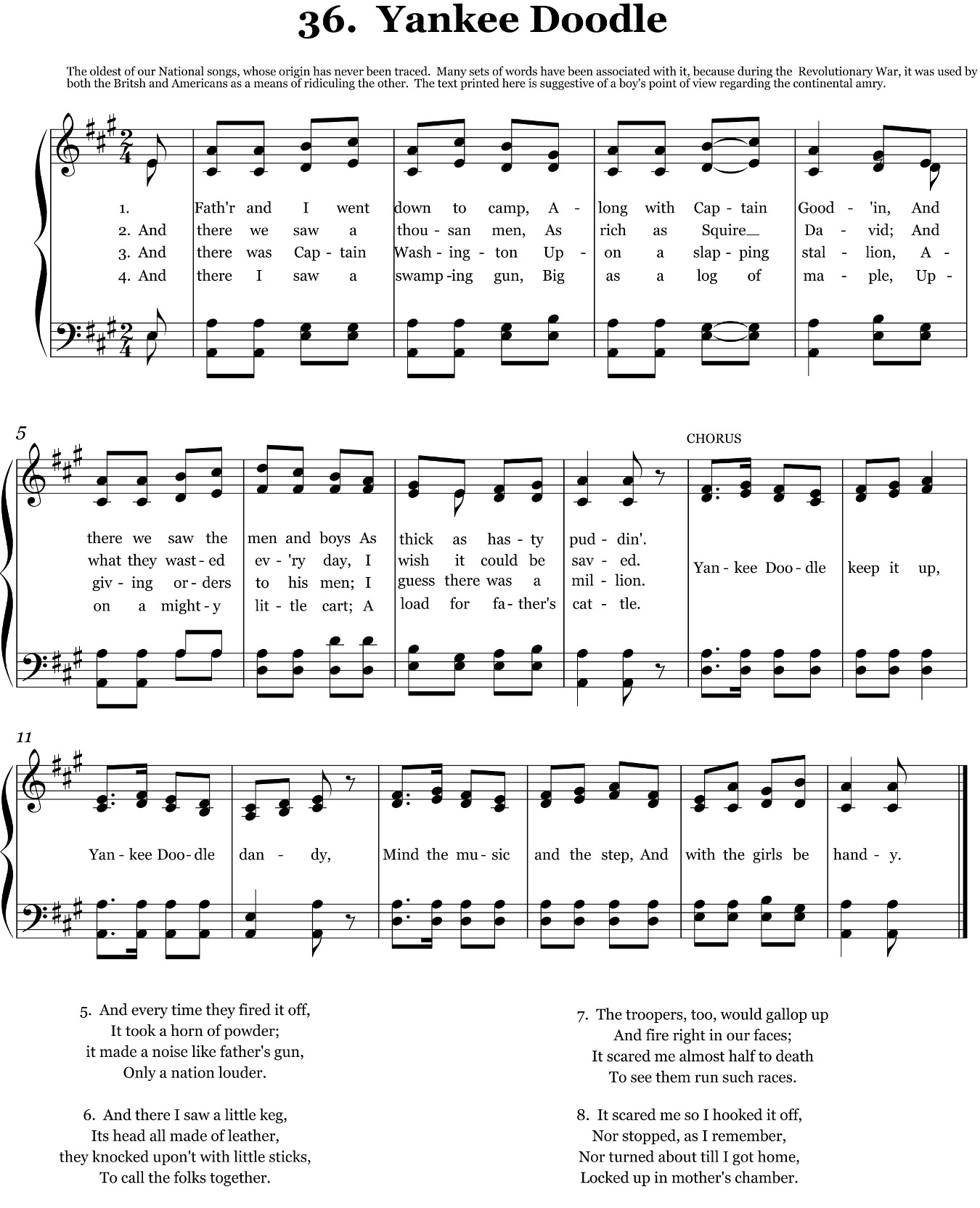
Sheet music for Yankee Doodle

1. Yankee Doodle Variations
Performed by Carrie Rehkopf

2. Yankee Doodle
Choral version by United States Army Chorus

"Yankee Doodle" is a traditional song and nursery rhyme, the early versions of which predate the Seven Years' War and American Revolutionary War. It is often sung patriotically in the United States today. It is the state song of the U.S. state of Connecticut. It served as one of the de facto national anthems of the United States, along with Hail, Columbia and My Country, 'Tis of Thee, before the official adoption of The Star-Spangled Banner as the national anthem of the United States on 3 March 1931. Its Roud Folk Song Index number is 4501.

== Origin ==
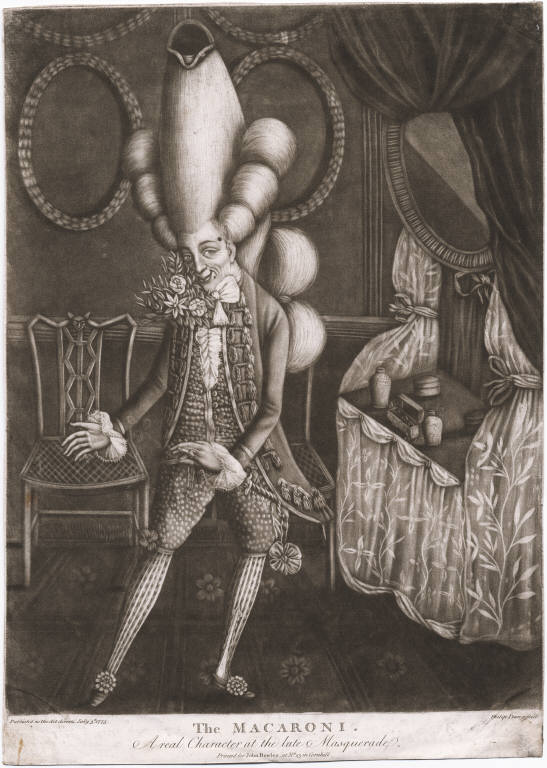
"The Macaroni. A real Character at the late Masquerade", a 1773 mezzotint by Philip Dawe

The tune of "Yankee Doodle" is thought to be much older than the lyrics, being well known across western Europe, including England, France, the Netherlands, Hungary, and Spain. The melody of the song may have originated from an Irish tune "All the way to Galway", in which the second strain is identical to Yankee Doodle. There are rumors that the earliest words of "Yankee Doodle" came from a Middle Dutch harvest song which is thought to have followed the same tune, supposedly dating back as far as 15th-century Holland. It supposedly contained mostly nonsense words in English and Dutch: "Yanker, didel, doodle down, Diddle, dudel, lanther, Yanke viver, voover vown, Botermilk und tanther." Farm laborers in Holland were paid "as much buttermilk (Botermelk) as they could drink, and a tenth (tanther) of the grain".

The term Doodle first appeared in English in the early 17th century and is thought to be derived from the Low German dudel, meaning "playing music badly", or Dödel, meaning "fool" or "simpleton". The Macaroni wig was an extreme fashion in the 1770s and became slang for being a fop. Dandies were men who placed particular importance upon physical appearance, refined language, and leisure hobbies. A self-made dandy was a British middle-class man who impersonated an aristocratic lifestyle. They notably wore silk strip cloth, stuck feathers in their hats, and carried two pocket watches with chains—"one to tell what time it was and the other to tell what time it was not".

The macaroni wig was an example of such Rococo dandy fashion, popular in elite circles in Western Europe and much-mocked in the London press. The term macaroni was used to describe a fashionable man who dressed and spoke in an outlandishly affected and effeminate manner. The term pejoratively referred to a man who "exceeded the ordinary bounds of fashion" in terms of clothes, fastidious eating, and gambling.

In British conversation, the term "Yankee doodle dandy" implied unsophisticated misappropriation of upper-class fashion, as though simply sticking a feather in one's cap would transform the wearer into a noble. Peter McNeil, a professor of fashion studies, claims that the British were insinuating that the colonists were lower-class men who lacked masculinity, emphasizing that the American men were womanly.

=== Early versions ===
The song was a pre-Revolutionary War song originally sung by British military officers to mock the disheveled, disorganized colonial "Yankees" with whom they served in the French and Indian War. It was written at Fort Crailo around 1755 or 1758 by British Army surgeon Richard Shuckburgh while campaigning in Rensselaer, New York. The British troops sang it to mock American soldiers as simpletons who thought that they were stylish simply by sticking a feather in their hats. It was also embraced by American troops, who added verses to it that mocked the British and hailed George Washington. By 1781, "Yankee Doodle" had become a song of national pride among Americans.

According to one account, Shuckburgh wrote the original lyrics after seeing the appearance of Colonial troops under Colonel Thomas Fitch, the son of Connecticut Governor Thomas Fitch. According to the Online Etymology Dictionary, "the current version seems to have been written in 1776 by Edward Bangs, a Harvard sophomore who also was a Minuteman." He wrote a ballad with 15 verses which circulated in Boston and surrounding towns in 1775 or 1776.

A bill was introduced to the House of Representatives on July 25, 1999, recognizing Billerica, Massachusetts, as "America's Yankee Doodle Town". After the Battle of Lexington and Concord, a Boston newspaper reported:

Upon their return to Boston [pursued by the Minutemen], one [Briton] asked his brother officer how he liked the tune now, – "Dang them", returned he, "they made us dance it till we were tired" – since which Yankee Doodle sounds less sweet to their ears.

The earliest known version of the lyrics comes from 1755 or 1758 (the date of origin is disputed): The first verses reads:

Brother Ephraim sold his Cow
And bought him a Commission;
And then he went to Canada
To fight for the Nation;

But when Ephraim he came home
He proved an arrant Coward,
He wouldn't fight the Frenchmen there
For fear of being devoured.

The sheet music which accompanies these lyrics reads, "The Words to be Sung through the Nose, & in the West Country drawl & dialect." The tune also appeared in 1762 in The Disappointment, a comic ballad opera from Pennsylvania colony, with bawdy lyrics about the search for Blackbeard's buried treasure by a team from Philadelphia. An alternate verse that the British are said to have marched to is attributed to an incident involving Thomas Ditson of Billerica, Massachusetts. In March 1775, Ditson attempted to illegally buy the Brown Bess musket of a soldier of the 47th Regiment of Foot in Boston; after a group of the soldier's comrades spotted the transaction as it was occurring, they tarred and feathered Ditson in order to prevent any such purchases from happening in the future. Ditson eventually managed to acquire a musket and fought at the Battles of Lexington and Concord. For this reason, the town of Billerica is called the home of "Yankee Doodle":

Yankee Doodle came to town,
For to buy a firelock,
We will tar and feather him,
And so we will John Hancock.

Another pro-British set of lyrics believed to have used the tune was published in June 1775 following the Battle of Bunker Hill:

The seventeenth of June, at Break of Day,
The Rebels they supriz'd us,
With their strong Works, which they'd thrown up,
To burn the Town and drive us.

"Yankee Doodle" was played at the British surrender at Saratoga in 1777. A variant is preserved in the 1810 edition of Gammer Gurton's Garland: Or, The Nursery Parnassus, collected by Francis Douce, now in the Bodleian Library, Oxford:

Yankee Doodle came to town,
How do you think they serv'd him?
One took his bag, another his scrip,
The quicker for to starve him.

== Full version ==
The Spirit of '76 (aka Yankee Doodle)
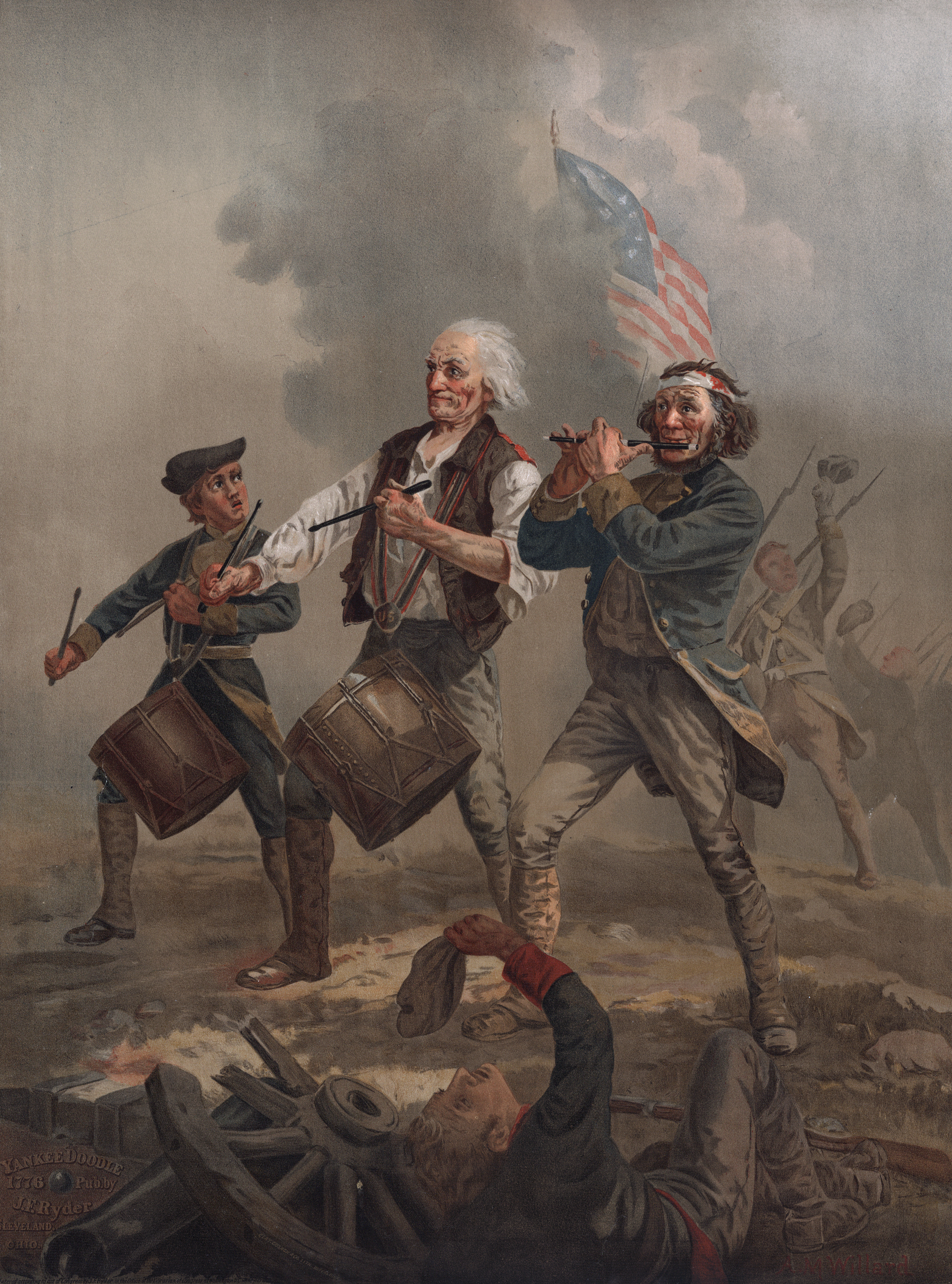
- Artist: Archibald Willard
- Year: c. 1875
- Type: Oil
- Dimensions: 61 cm × 45 cm (24 in × 18 in)
- Location: Abbot Hall, Marblehead Massachusetts

The full version of the song as it is known today:

Yankee Doodle went to town
A-riding on a pony,
Stuck a feather in his cap
And called it macaroni.

[Chorus]
Yankee Doodle, keep it up,
Yankee Doodle dandy,
Mind the music and the step,
And with the girls be handy.

Father and I went down to camp,
Along with Captain Gooding, (Note: Captain William Gooding of Dighton, Massachusetts, commanded a militia company during the French and Indian War.)
And there we saw the men and boys
As thick as hasty pudding.

[Chorus]

And there we saw a thousand men
As rich as Squire David,
And what they wasted every day,
I wish it could be savèd.

[Chorus]

The 'lasses they eat every day,
Would keep a house a winter;
They have so much, that I'll be bound,
They eat it when they've a mind to.

[Chorus]

And there I see a swamping (Note: Very large; huge.) gun
Large as a log of maple,
Upon a deuced little cart,
A load for father's cattle.

[Chorus]

And every time they shoot it off,
It takes a horn of powder,
And makes a noise like father's gun,
Only a nation (Note: A corruption of damnation. Immense, enormous; very, extremely.) louder.

[Chorus]

I went as nigh to one myself
As 'Siah's underpinning;
And father went as nigh again,
I thought the deuce was in him.

[Chorus]

Cousin Simon grew so bold,
I thought he would have cocked it;
It scared me so I shrinked it off
And hung by father's pocket.

[Chorus]

And Cap'n Davis had a gun,
He kind of clapt his hand on't
And stuck a crooked stabbing iron
Upon the little end on't

[Chorus]

And there I see a pumpkin shell
As big as mother's basin,
And every time they touched it off
They scampered like the nation.

[Chorus]

I see a little barrel too,
The heads were made of leather;
They knocked on it with little clubs
And called the folks together.

[Chorus]

And there was Cap'n Washington,
And gentle folks about him;
They say he's grown so 'tarnal proud
He will not ride without 'em.

[Chorus]

He got him on his meeting clothes,
Upon a slapping stallion;
He sat the world along in rows,
In hundreds and in millions.

[Chorus]

The flaming ribbons in his hat,
They looked so tearing fine, ah,
I wanted dreadfully to get
To give to my Jemima.

[Chorus]

I see another snarl of men
A-digging graves, they told me,
So 'tarnal long, so 'tarnal deep,
They 'tended they should hold me.

[Chorus]

It scared me so, I hooked it off,
Nor stopped, as I remember,
Nor turned about till I got home,
Locked up in mother's chamber.

[Chorus]

== Tune ==
The tune shares with the English language nursery rhymes "Simple Simon", "Jack and Jill", and "Lucy Locket", as well as the Japanese dōyō "Alps Ichiman Jaku". It also inspired the theme tune for the children's television series, the 1960s US cartoon series Roger Ramjet, Barney & the Backyard Gang, and Barney & Friends. Danish band Toy-Box sampled the tune in their song "E.T".

== Notable renditions ==
The American state broadcaster Voice of America (VOA) uses the tune of Yankee Doodle as their interval signal. There is uncertainty over the origin of the VOA's decision to use the tune. In his 1990 memoir Being Red, Howard Fast claimed that while working as the VOA's chief news writer and news director in 1943, he selected "as a joke" Yankee Doodle for the broadcaster's interval signal.

I established contact at the Soviet embassy with people who spoke English and were willing to feed me important bits and pieces from their side of the wire. I had long ago, somewhat facetiously, suggested “Yankee Doodle” as our musical signal, and now that silly little jingle was a power cue, a note of hope everywhere on earth, conveyed by short wave as well as by our four-hour American BBC. When I sat down to write “Good morning, this is the Voice of America,” I now have a grasp of things.

== See also ==
- Yankee Doodle Dandy, 1942 musical film
- "The Yankee Doodle Boy", 1904 song
