= North Tonawanda Barrel Organ Factory =

Organ manufacturer in New York, U.S.

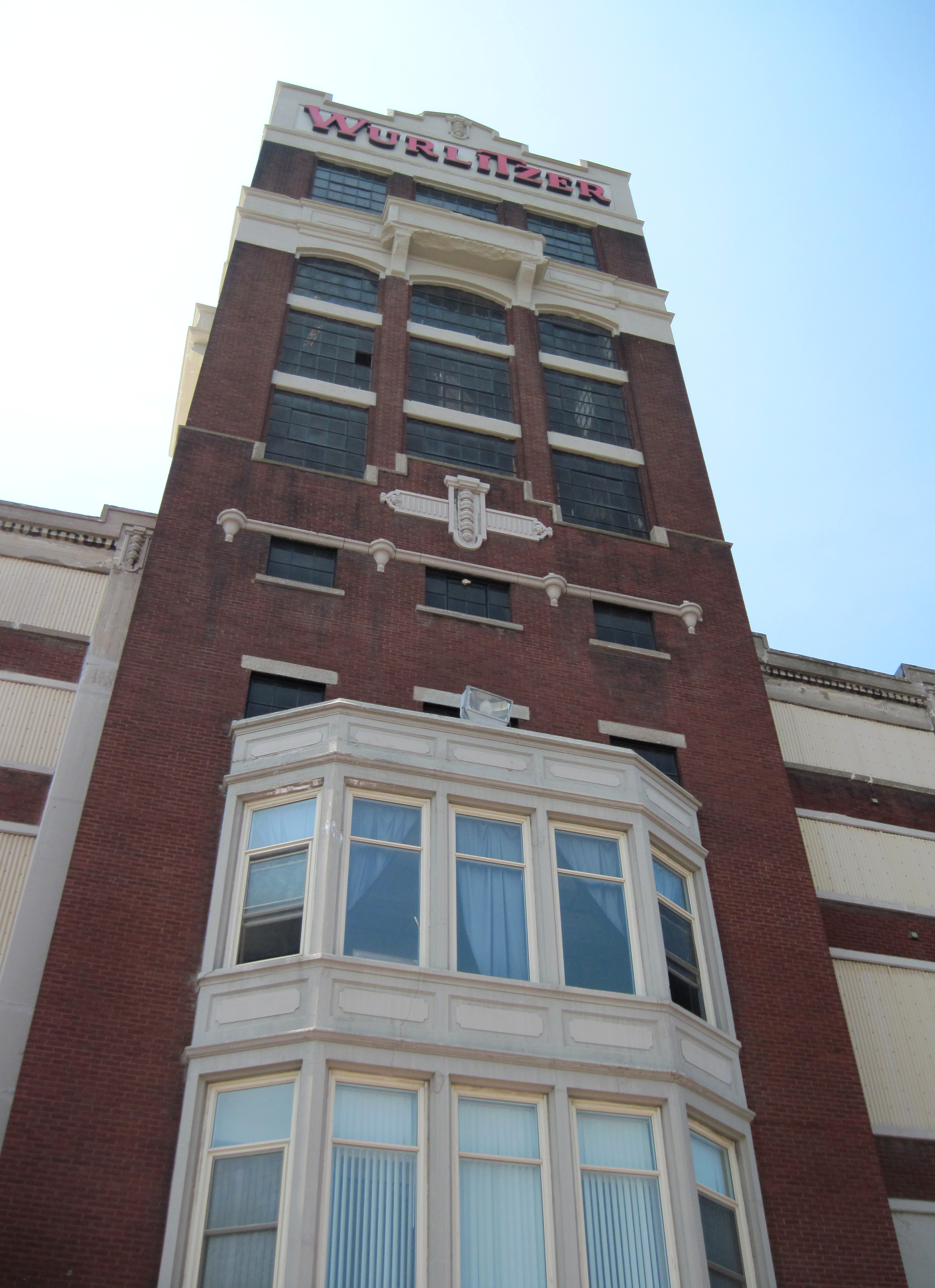
- Front tower, 2012
- Alternative names: The Wurlitzer Building

General information
- Location: North Tonawanda, New York, United States
- Coordinates: 43°3′40″N 78°50′35″W
- Current tenants: Multiple
- Completed: Original portion 1893, added to until the 1950s

Technical details
- Structural system: Reinforced concrete
- Floor area: 750,000 square feet (70,000 m^{2})

Website
- thewurlitzerbuilding.com

The North Tonawanda Barrel Organ Factory was a street organ manufacturing company and building, located in North Tonawanda, New York. Started by expatriate German Eugene de Kleist with backing from Allan Herschell, the company was later purchased by the Wurlitzer company.

== Foundations ==
In 1892, the United States government imposed high import tariffs on both street and fairground organ importation. At this time only the French company of Gavioli had an office established in North America, but the move deterred other European organ manufacturers from doing the same. The result was that embryonic American fairground ride manufacturers were now starved of high-quality instruments to attract fair goers, resulting in lower sales.

In 1883, William Herschell, son of carousel builder Allan Herschell, traveled to London, England to meet former Limonaire Frères employee Eugene de Kleist. Backed by Herschell, in 1893 de Kleist set up band organ production in what was then part of Martinsville, New York (soon to be incorporated as North Tonawanda, New York), founding the North Tonawanda Barrel Organ Factory. As parts were not subject to the import tariffs, many of the companies early organs had Limonaire components. The company produced a range of barrel organ based products, suited for all ranges of fairground attraction.

== Wurlitzer Tonophone ==
As production grew, de Kleist approached other musical instrument manufacturers to create new instruments under their brands. One of these companies was the Wurlitzer company of Cincinnati, Ohio. Wurlitzer said no to buying any of De Kleist's existing barrel-organ based products, but said that they would buy a coin-operated piano. As development progressed, in 1903 the business was incorporated as the DeKleist Musical Instrument Manufacturing Company.

The Tonophone, played by a pinned cylinder instead of being operated by direct mechanical linkages, was pneumatically operated. The cylinder pins lifted levers which opened valves to a pneumatic mechanism which operated the piano. First shown at the 1901 Pan-American Exposition, the Tonophone won a gold medal at the exhibition, and went on to be a commercial success. Today, there are thought to be fewer than four complete and working Tonophones left in the world.

== Rudolph Wurlitzer Company ==
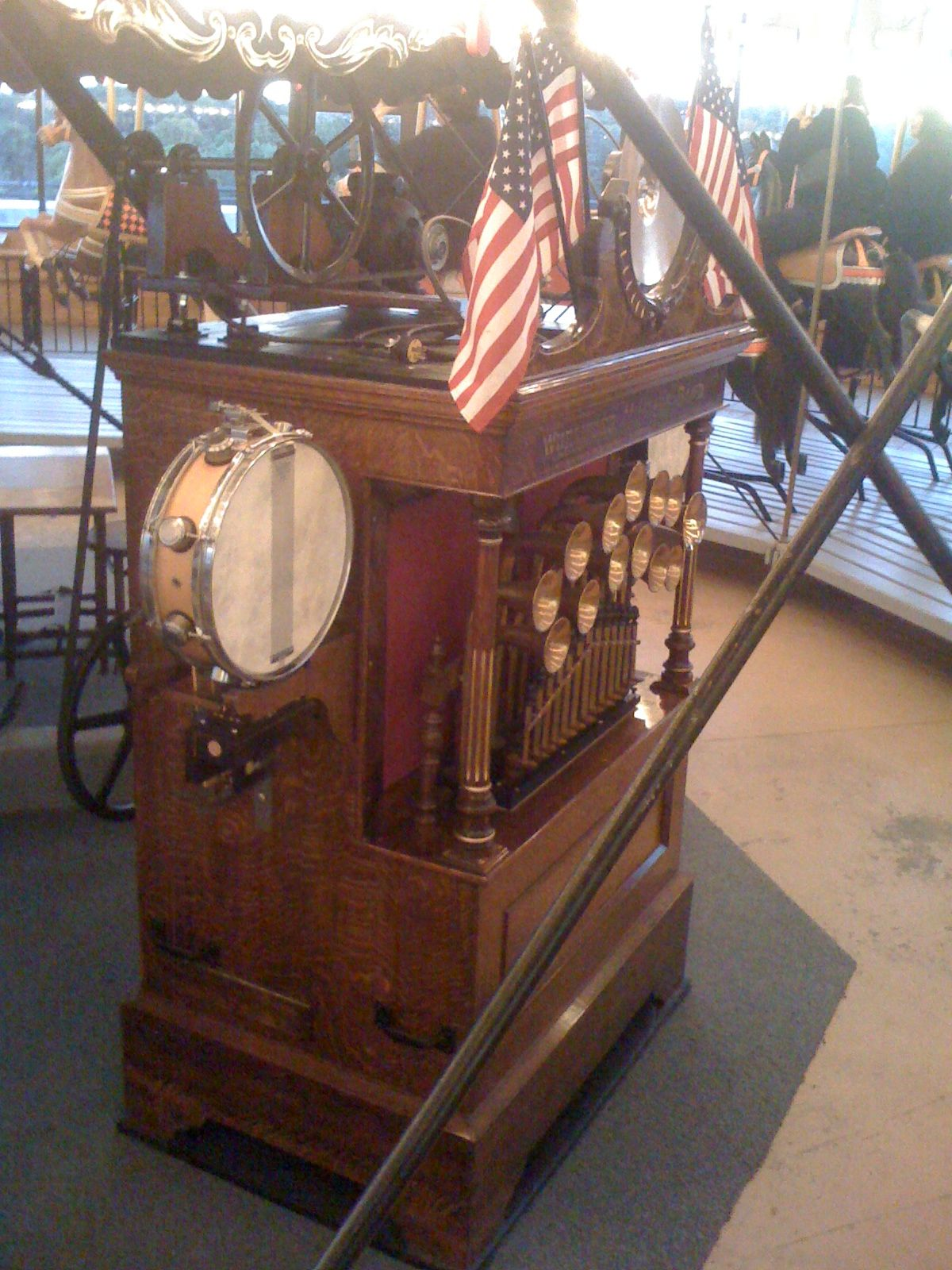
A carousel band organ produced by the Rudolph Wurlitzer Company of North Tonawanda

The Tonophone brought about a commercial agreement between de Kleist and Wurlitzer, cemented in 1901 after Allan Herschell left the Armitage Herschell Company due to financial complications. This allowed de Kleist to buy Armitage Herschell out, and seek new investment from his association with Wurlitzer. After de Kleist was voted in as mayor of North Tonawanda in 1906, Wurlitzer bought him out of the business in 1908. After his term as mayor ended, suffering from ill health, de Kleist retired to Berlin in 1911, dying in Biarritz, in 1913 from a heart attack.

The company was renamed the Rudolph Wurlitzer Company of North Tonawanda. This allowed the company to invest in new technology, resulting in the adoption of electric motors, and the music source was changed from pinned barrels to perforated paper rolls similar to a player piano roll. Some larger organs such as the style 157 and style 165 have duplex roll frames, on which one roll plays while the other rewinds, allowing for continuous music. Each paper roll contained about 10 songs, but during the Great Depression, this was changed to 6 longer songs, in order to save money on arranging.

The only substantial changes between these organs and the originals they were based upon is that the Wurlitzer models is that they operated on Wurlitzer's unique roll scale. These included the 46-note style 125 roll (used by styles 104, 105, 125, and smaller organs that saw less production), the wider 46-mote 150 roll (used by styles 146, 153, and other less common mid-size styles), or the still wider 75-note 165 roll (used by styles 157, 165, and larger special organ models). Due to Wurlitzer's success and domination of the market, many smaller American manufacturers adopted scales similar to Wurlitzer's, but to little effect.

During the Great Depression leading up to the end of production of organs, various cost-cutting measures were made, such as the substitution of brass horn and trumpet pipes for ones made of wood (though arguably, the brass pipes produced a shrill and unpleasant sound, thus causing the change to the mellower wooden sound).

The production of Wurlitzer organs ceased in 1942, the last organ to leave the factory being a style 165 organ in a 157 case (done because Wurlitzer had an extra 157 case still in the factory and the owner didn't mind the change).

After the end of World War II, during which the company helped develop and then produce the variable timing proximity fuze for the US Navy, production changed to producing a variety of items, including radios, jukeboxes and electronic organs. The plant closed in 1973 and was purchased, in the early 1980s, by a group of investors with the goal of turning the old plant into an industrial park.

== Present ==
Today the building is now home to a wide array of tenants, ranging from high visibility tenants like Platters Chocolates and Woodcock Brothers Brewing Company to various light industrial, high technology, and commercial businesses, lawyers' offices, and a medical billing company. The building's current owner has gone to great lengths trying to preserve this massive building. They are in an ongoing restoration project, and have replaced the original Wurlitzer sign with a new one along with many other countless and mostly unseen projects to continuously modernize the building while maintaining its historical integrity.

== See also ==
- Band organ
- Rudolph Wurlitzer Company # Band organs
  - List of Wurlitzer Band Organs
