= Dick Block =

Historic commercial building in New York, United States

- U.S. National Register of Historic Places
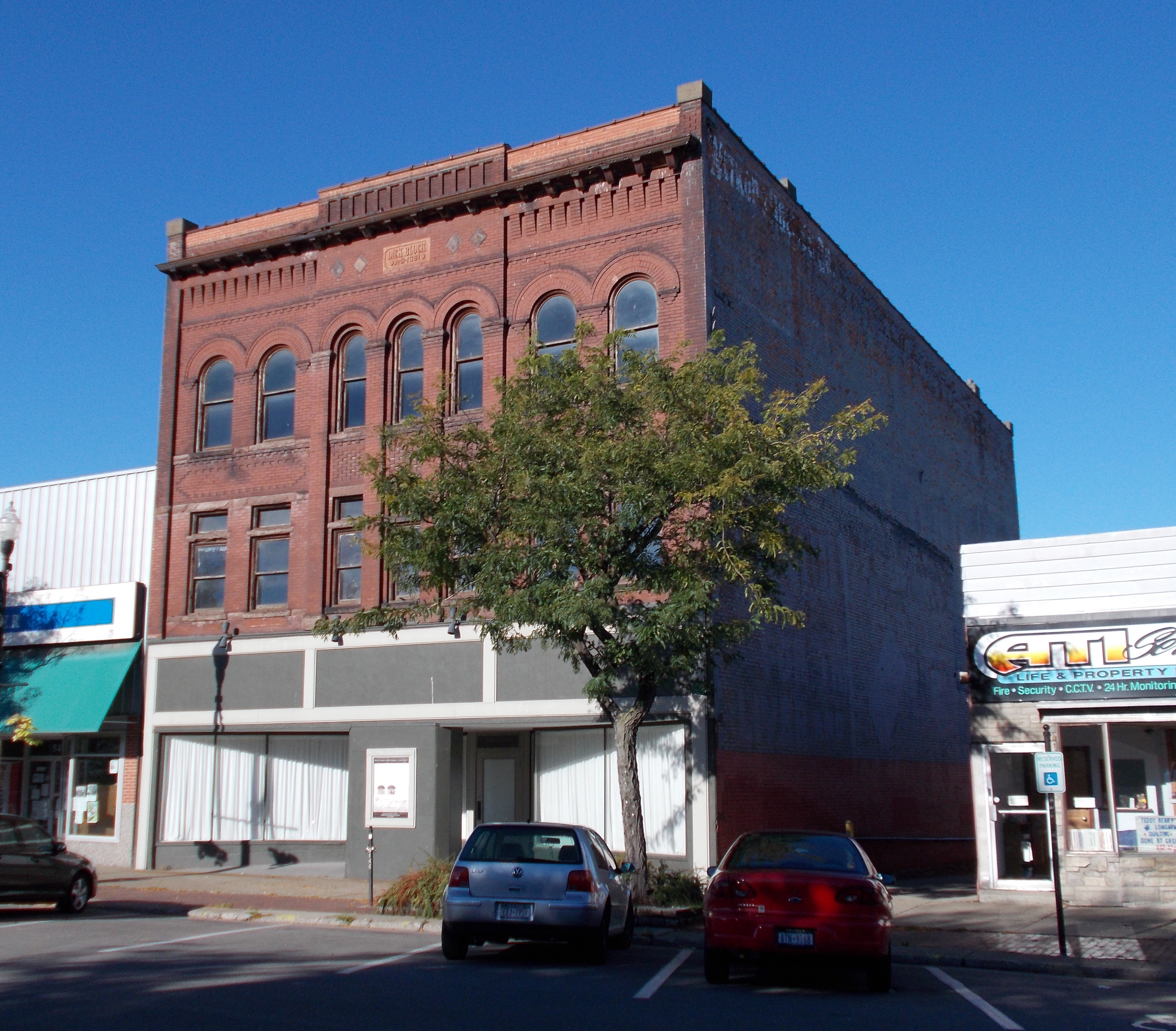
- The Dick Block, September 2012

- Location within New York Location within the United States
- Location: 62 Webster St, North Tonawanda, New York
- Coordinates: 43°01′25″N 78°52′40″W
- Area: less than one acre
- Built: 1891
- Architectural style: Romanesque Revival
- NRHP reference No.: 12000957
- Added to NRHP: November 21, 2012

Dick Block is an historic commercial building located at North Tonawanda in Niagara County, New York. Built in 1891, it is a three-story, three-bay, red-brick building in the Romanesque Revival style. It features rounded windows and arches, rusticated stone detailing, and ornamental brickwork. The first-floor storefronts were modernized about 1946, when the building was occupied by the Witkop and Holmes Company furniture store.

It was listed on the National Register of Historic Places in 2012.
