= North Tonawanda City School District =

School district in the U.S. state of New York

North Tonawanda City School District is a public school district that covers North Tonawanda, New York. The school district consists of 3,371 students (2017) in grades PreK-12 (One PreK center, three K-3 elementary schools, one 4-6 intermediate school, one 7-8 middle school, and one 9-12 high school).

The superintendent is Jeff Jachlewski.

== Schools ==
=== PreK ===
- Ohio (operated by Carousel Academy) Built in 1962. Opened on September 5, 1962 and dedicated on November 11, 1962

=== Elementary (K-3) ===
- Drake Elementary School (Built in 1956) Opened on November 13, 1956
- Ohio Elementary School (Built in 1962) Opened on September 5, 1962 and dedicated on November 11, 1962
- Spruce Elementary School (Built in 1953) Opened on September 8, 1954 and dedicated on March 13, 1955

==== Former ====
- Gilmore Elementary School - Opened in 1926, closed on June 22, 2012.

=== Intermediate (4-6) ===
- North Tonawanda Intermediate School (formerly North Tonawanda Middle School) - Built in 1966 as Dr. Thaddeus F. Reszel Junior High School. Opened on April 22, 1968 and dedicated on October 20, 1968

=== Middle (7-8) ===
North Tonawanda Middle School (formerly Meadow Elementary School) - Opened on September 4, 1963 and dedicated on September 29, 1963

==== Former ====
George L. Lowry Middle School - Built in 1925 (cornerstone laid on May 23, 1925) as the former North Tonawanda High School. Opened on September 7, 1926 and closed on June 30, 2004. Dedicated on November 12, 1926

=== High (9-12) ===
- North Tonawanda High School
