= Richard Hy =

YouTuber and police officer

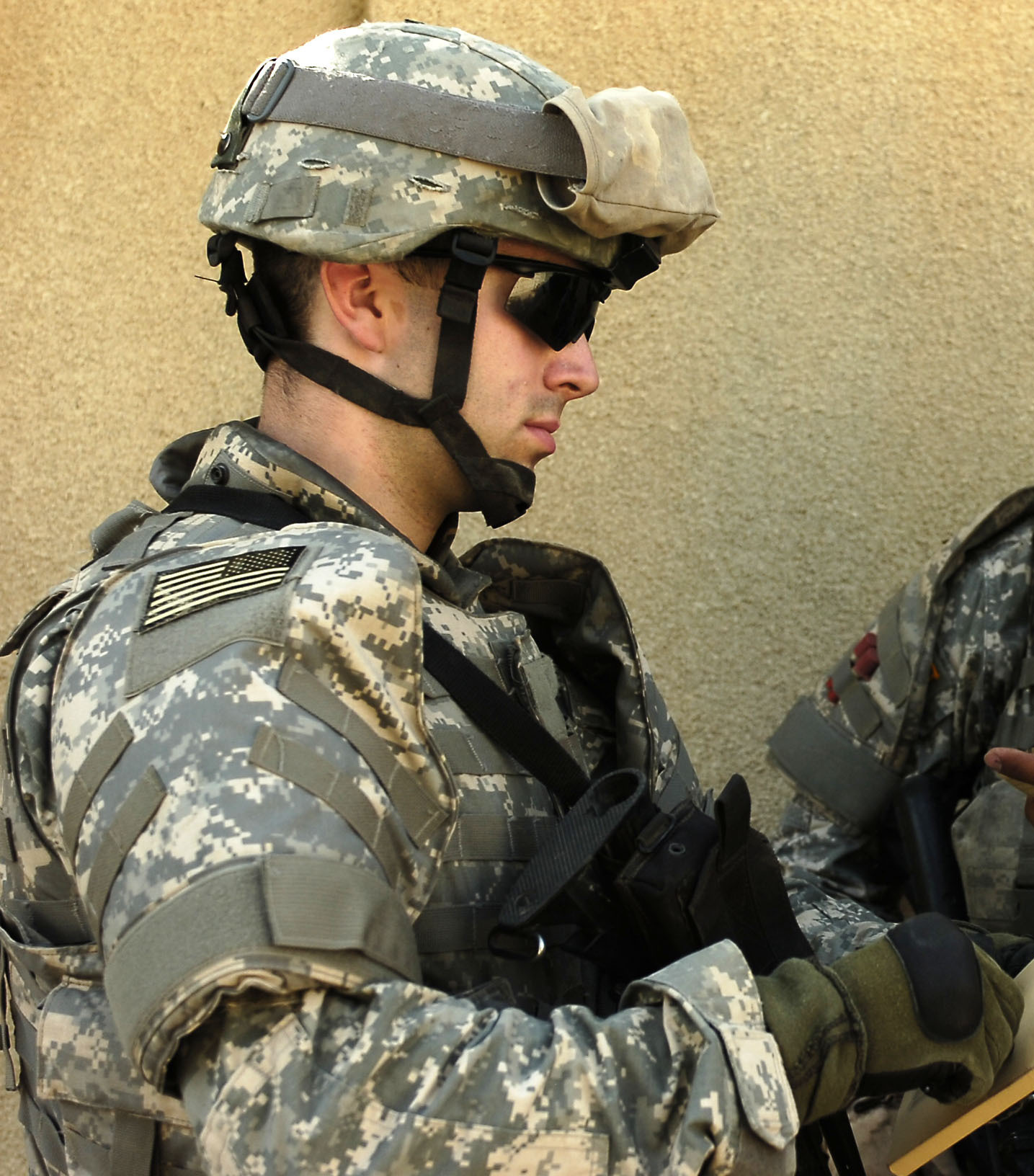
- Hy in 2006
- Born: Richard N. Hy; 1987 or 1988 (age 38–39)
- Education: North Tonawanda High School
- Occupations: YouTuber; police detective; drill instructor
- Police career
- Country: United States
- Department: Buffalo Police Department
- Service years: 2012–Present
- Rank: Detective
- Military career
- Allegiance: United States
- Branch: New York Army National Guard
- Service years: 2005–Present
- Rank: Staff Sergeant
- Awards: Combat Action Badge

YouTube information
- Channel: Angry Cops
- Years active: 2017–present
- Genres: vlogging; commentary; comedy
- Subscribers: 1.55 million
- Views: 499 million
- Last updated: October 13th, 2026

Richard N. Hy, also known as Angry Cops, is an American YouTuber, Special Victims Unit detective for the Buffalo Police Department, and US Army Drill Sergeant. His YouTube channel consists of vlogs, commentary, and skits related to law enforcement and military subjects. He has been subject to controversy at multiple points in his policing career, over multiple incidents, on- and off-duty. In 2025, Hy made allegations that Buffalo Public Schools had obstructed investigations into child abuse and sexual abuse crimes.

== Early life ==
Hy graduated from North Tonawanda High School in 2005.

== Military career ==
Hy became a US Army reservist immediately after graduating high school. He completed basic training on October 14, 2005 from Fort Jackson, South Carolina as part of D Company, 2nd Battalion, 39th Infantry Regiment. He was honored as having achieved the highest possible score on the end-of-cycle physical fitness test. He then started his military career as a civil affairs specialist in the 402nd Civil Affairs Battalion.

Hy served on two combat tours in Iraq and has been awarded the Combat Action Badge.

As of 2020, he is a staff sergeant and training non-commissioned officer for the recruiting battalion of the New York Army National Guard.

== Social media career ==
Hy's social media presence goes back as far as September 2014. He started out by posting footage and humorous skits related to police work on the now defunct short-form content platform Vine. His YouTube channel was created on February 16, 2017.

Hy's posts on different social media platforms have resulted in two suspensions from the Buffalo Police Department, in 2016 and 2017 respectively. WIVB-TV reported that his social media activity had also gotten him in trouble twice with superiors in the military as well as more times in the police department. He has alleged that his social media presence has stunted his career growth as a police officer.

On March 4, 2021, Hy uploaded a video to his YouTube channel detailing allegations by soldiers of 2nd Battalion, 30th Infantry Regiment at Fort Polk, Louisiana that Command Sgt. Maj. Albert Buchinski had forced soldiers to remain outside during a January field exercise without reporting to aid stations, under threat of non-judicial punishment, resulting in several cases of hypothermia and trench foot. While no punishment was administered, Buchinski allegedly criticized soldiers for receiving treatment, believing their gear should have kept them dry. The commanding officer of the battalion, Lt. Col. Benjamin Jackman, contacted Hy, claiming his information was bad. Hy was then subject to investigations by the New York National Guard, to determine if any of his actions had broken military regulations, and the Buffalo Police Department, who had received a complaint from Jackman's wife that her husband and Buchinski were defamed by Hy, and that he had violated their social media policy. BPD exonerated Hy of any wrongdoing in April.

Hy's social media platforms were estimated to be worth over $750,000 as of 2022.

On September 15, 2024, Hy uploaded a video to YouTube criticizing the establishment and fundraising efforts of a Veterans of Foreign Wars post inside the Sterling Correctional Facility in Colorado, believing that the crimes of its members were too heinous to warrant them being a part of the organization. VFW was subject to a wave of criticism following the video, which ultimately culminated in a new guideline on October 11 that convicted felons currently serving time would no longer be able to join the organization. This resulted in the post falling below the 10-member minimum requirement, in turn resulting in the group shutting down. VFW Adjutant General Dan West stated that there was no plan to reinstitute the post or establish any new ones at a correctional facility.

== Law enforcement career ==
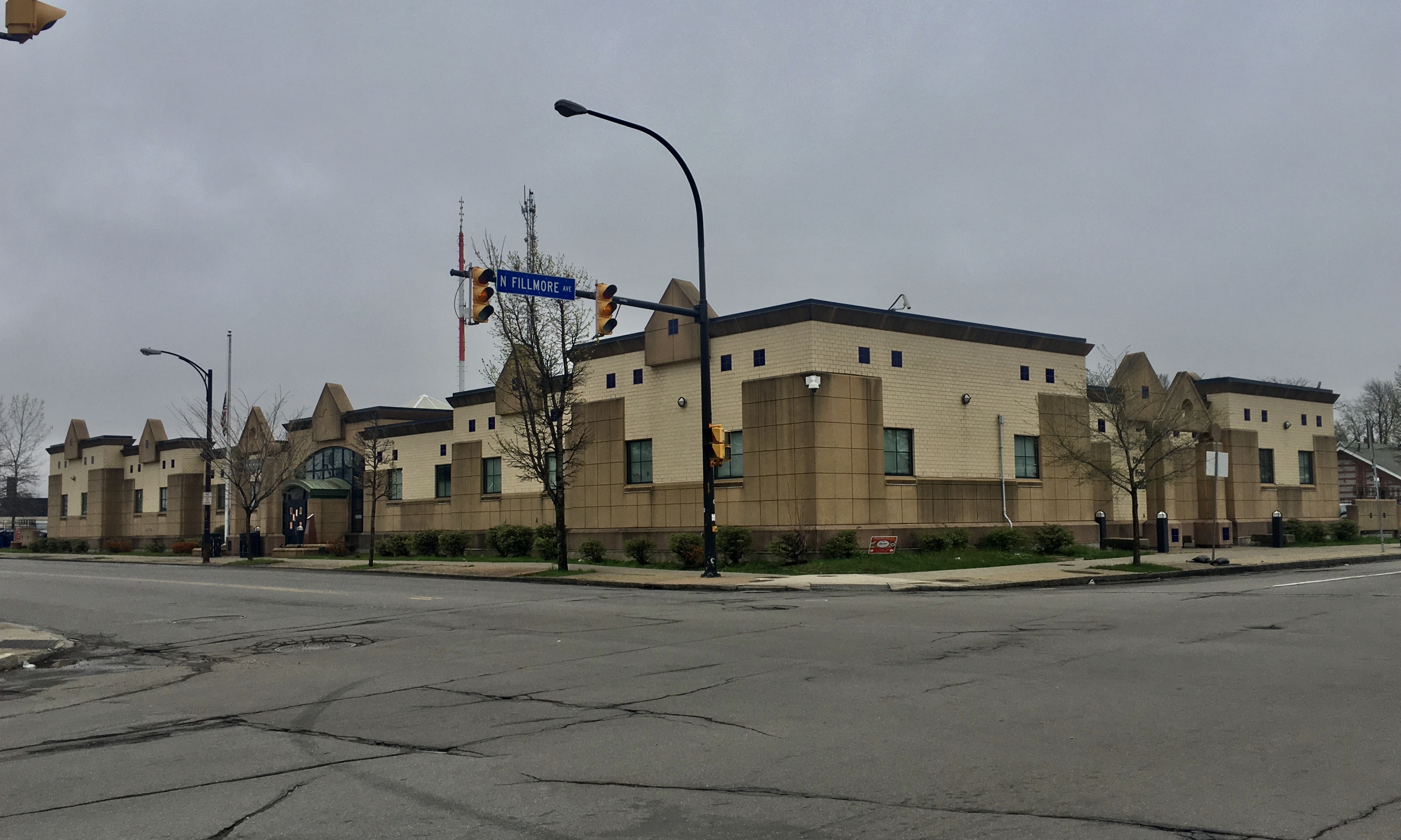
District C Police Station in Buffalo, New York, where Hy was briefly stationed in 2013.

Hy joined the Buffalo Police Department in 2012, starting out by patrolling the A district in South Buffalo. In 2013, Hy transferred to the C district, composed of predominantly black neighborhoods, then to E district, also composed of predominantly minority groups.

In 2014, Hy joined Strike Force, a special unit targeting gangs, drugs, and firearms. He was subject to two use-of-force complaints while in the unit, though internal affairs dubbed these incidents "not sustained". Hy's friends reported in February 2016 that he had made over 300 arrests and confiscated over 20 illegal firearms up to that point while he was part of the unit.

By 2015, Hy had four use-of-force complaints on record, all of which were deemed either "not sustained" or "unfounded" by internal affairs. In October 2015, Hy was recorded in a struggle with a man, and was accused by bystanders of choking him. It was later confirmed that Hy was attempting to prevent the man from choking on 39 bags of cocaine that he had swallowed before he was taken to the hospital.

In 2016, Hy was temporarily suspended from his position without pay for violating social media rules by the Buffalo Police Department, particularly for creating videos while on the job, and mostly on police property. On September 13, 2016, Hy was suspended from the department again. He was charged with second-degree harassment, third-degree assault, and criminal obstruction of breathing after he and another officer got into a fight with local teenagers filming a rap video. The police report stated that Hy had threatened and berated the group and headbutted one in the face after they refused to give him the passcode to their cellphone. He also chased down the same victim and choked him in a headlock. Police reported that he appeared intoxicated and that his breath smelled of alcohol as Hy presented a bag of cannabis he had taken from them. Hy reportedly also referred to the teens using the n-word. Hy pleaded guilty to one charge of disorderly conduct, and was fined and sentenced to 50 hours of community service.

In 2017, Hy was suspended again for posting a video to Facebook of his interactions while on duty of a woman struggling to stand. Hy stated it was due to heroin, and that he thought the video served as a PSA on drug addiction.

External videos
- Judge Grisanti and the Angry Cop

In early June 2020, Hy was among the 57 officers on the Buffalo Police Department's Emergency Response team who resigned from the team during the Buffalo police shoving incident. On June 22, 2020, Hy was involved in the arrest of then-New York Supreme Court Justice Mark Grisanti. Hy was recorded reprimanding Grisanti for name-dropping political and law enforcement connections while officers were trying to deescalate a fight between Grisanti and his neighbors. A 2024 investigation by the New York State Attorney General's Office found that this was unprofessional behavior constituting misconduct.

On September 3, 2020, Hy was recorded fighting a man while off-duty and in army uniform, for which he was subject to an internal investigation by the Buffalo Police Department. Witnesses reported the man had been acting erratically for hours, running through traffic, yelling obscenities, and spitting. Police and a social worker had been called to the scene earlier, but did not believe the man threatened himself or others. Witnesses then reported that Hy had warned the man to get out of the street. The man responded by cursing at Hy, hitting and spitting on his SUV, and assaulting him with a skateboard, after which Hy claimed to defend himself, and sat on the man until the arrival of uniformed officers. Witness and expert opinion has been mixed in regards to Hy's response to the situation. Hy was exonerated by the internal investigation in 2021. The Investigative Post noted at this time that Hy was currently assigned to D district and had made $99,582 as a police officer during the previous fiscal year.

Hy was found by the New York State Attorney's Law Enforcement Misconduct Investigation Office to have acted in misconduct during an arrest of a 14-year-old suspected of armed robbery on July 18, 2021, by using excessive force and referring to the suspect as "fat boy". On July 19, 2021, Hy pursued a group of motorcyclists and reversed his car into a motorcyclist identified as Curtis Lee Dean, who had slowed behind his car. The subsequent interaction between Dean and Hy was recorded by bystanders. A lawsuit naming Hy was filed by Dean on August 30, 2022 over the incident. A 2024 investigation by the New York State Attorney General's Office found that Hy's actions constituted misconduct. In 2025, the city of Buffalo paid $65,000 to settle the lawsuit.

In October 2021, Hy and his attorney alleged in a press release that he had been repeatedly passed up for promotion due to his YouTube videos in violation of his First Amendment rights. The Buffalo Police Benevolent Association held the position that Hy should be promoted, though its president, John Evans, noted he might be held back due multiple other unnamed reasons outside of his activity on social media.

By February 2022, Hy had been subject to 23 internal affairs investigations for on- and off-duty behavior. During this month, he was also referred to the New York Attorney General's Law Enforcement Misconduct Investigative Office.

In 2023, Hy was promoted to the rank of lieutenant, with a yearly salary of $94,528. WKBW-TV reported in September 2023 that the Erie County District Attorney's Office had Hy listed on their Brady list.

A report from the New York Attorney General's Law Enforcement Misconduct Investigative Office from September 5, 2024 found that Hy had "engaged in a pattern of misconduct of escalating encounters with civilians, including by using physical force, discourtesy, and unprofessional conduct", and suggested that the Buffalo Police Department should create a plan to monitor Hy's conduct and impose consequences for any future misconduct. The report also noted that Hy had decided to return to being a detective and was currently assigned to Buffalo's D district.

In 2026, Hy mistakenly closed the missing persons file on Nurul Amin Shah Alam, a Rohingya refugee from Myanmar who had previously been taken by United States Customs and Border Protection and left at a Tim Hortons coffee shop miles from his home without the knowledge of his family. According to unnamed sources, Hy was under the belief that ICE had Shah Alam in custody when closing the case before it was reopened hours later. The next day, Shah Alam was found dead several miles from where he was left. Buffalo Police told news outlet Investigative Post that it was unlikely Hy would face any professional repercussions for the incident.

=== Buffalo Public Schools allegations ===
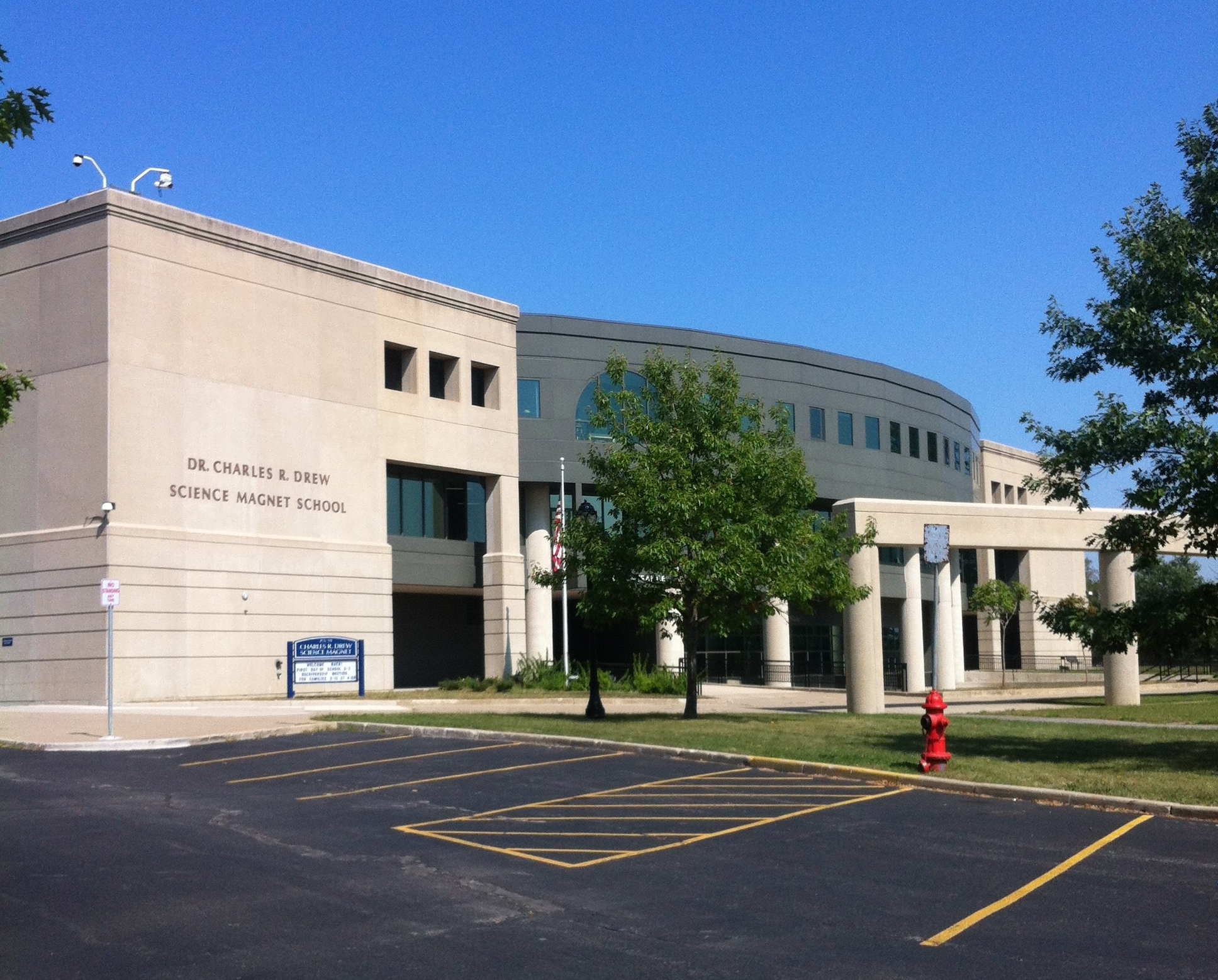
Dr. Charles R. Drew Science Magnet School, where an individual referenced by Hy in his allegations was accused of kidnapping a student.

External videos
- Your Kids Are In Danger - SVU Detective Exposes Buffalo School System

On April 26, 2025, on the Unsubscribe podcast, Hy alleged that the Buffalo Public Schools district had covered up and refused to work with law enforcement in cases of sexual assaults and abuse. He also stated that Buffalo Public Schools officials and attorneys had obstructed evidence and ignored subpoenas and court orders to cover up child abuse and sexual abuse within the district. This information was released in a YouTube video entitled "Your Kids Are In Danger - SVU Detective Exposes Buffalo School System", which had over 1 million views as of April 29, 2025. Hy stated that the Erie County District Attorney's office and his superiors were also frustrated, to which they replied with no comment on concerns about compromising ongoing investigations. After these allegations were made, a 30-year-old referenced by Hy in his allegations was charged with second-degree kidnapping, two counts of luring a child to commit a felony, three counts of endangering the welfare of a child, four counts of burglary, and five counts of assault causing injury on school ground, after being accused of kidnapping a student from Dr. Charles R. Drew Science Magnet School in February 2025.

In May 2025, Hy appeared on the Unsubscribe podcast again, and stated that an alleged rape of a student had been improperly handled by multiple teachers. He further alleged on the Black Rifle Coffee Podcast that teachers and school aides used school bathrooms as "time-out" rooms for students, claiming that the lights would be turned off and an adult would put their foot against the door to prevent them from leaving.

In June 2025, the School Board selected Rupp Pfalzgraf LLC to conduct an independent investigation into Hy's allegations. In February 2026, Rupp Pfalzgraff released their report, containing several redactions with the purpose of maintaining student privacy. The report stated that while the investigators did not find evidence of coverups or obstruction, they did find "systemic challenges requiring attention, including communication protocols, evidence-preservation procedures, training, and coordination between schools and law enforcement and related entities." The report specifically found instances of bad communication and reporting in connection with evidence not received by Hy as part of a sexual assault case, a failure to enter a lockdown instead of a shelter-in-place procedure during the kidnapping incident, and lack of staff training after a teacher accidentally gave a student candy laced with THC. In spite of the lack of evidence of any coverups, a representative for Rupp Pfalzgraf stated "there is some validity to what [Hy] said."
