= United States Post Office (North Tonawanda, New York) =

- US Post Office--North Tonawanda
- U.S. National Register of Historic Places
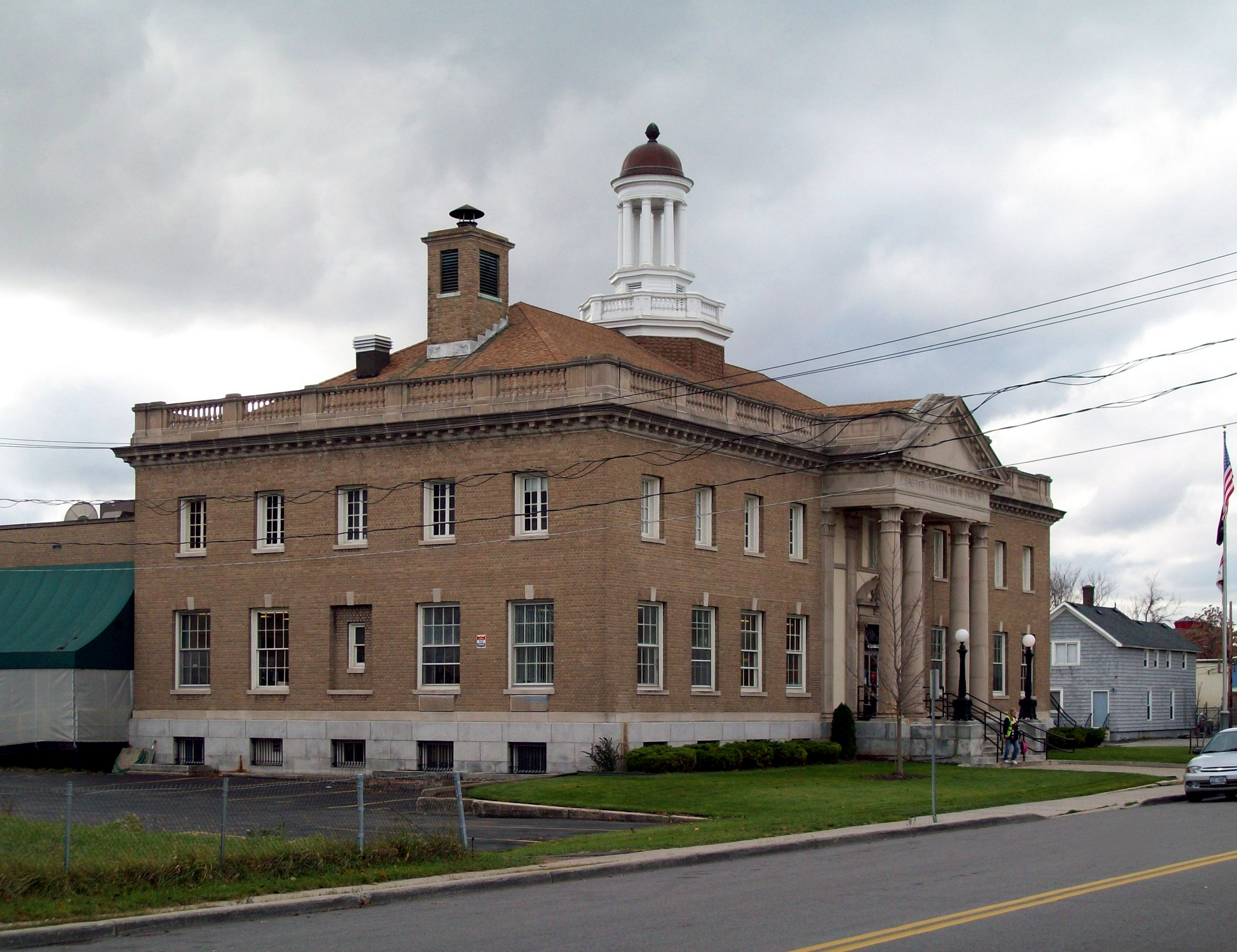
- North Tonawanda Post Office, November 2008

- Location within New York Location within the United States
- Interactive map showing the location for U.S. Post Office-North Tonawanda
- Location: 141 Goundry St., North Tonawanda, New York
- Coordinates: 43°1′29″N 78°52′23″W
- Built: 1912
- Architect: Wenderoth, Oscar; US Treasury Department
- Architectural style: Classical Revival
- MPS: US Post Offices in New York State, 1858-1943, TR
- NRHP reference No.: 88002357
- Added to NRHP: May 11, 1989

US Post Office—North Tonawanda is a historic post office building located at North Tonawanda in Niagara County, New York. It was designed and built in 1912, and is one of the number of post offices in New York State designed by the Office of the Supervising Architect of the Treasury Department, Oscar Wenderoth. The two story building is in the Classical Revival style and features a colossal central portico with two pairs of coupled columns resting on granite pedestals and an elegant domed cupola.

It was listed on the National Register of Historic Places in 1989.
