= The Disappointment =

1767 American ballad opera

The Disappointment, or The Force of Credulity is a ballad opera composed by Samuel Adler in two acts with a prologue and epilogue, to a text by an unknown author writing under the pseudonym "Andrew Barton". William Peterson, in 1766, claimed that the opera was written by a "son of Philadelphia College," leading to speculation that the author may have been Francis Hopkinson or Jacob Duché. In his book on American drama, Walter Meserve claims that the author was named Thomas Forrest. Regarded as one of the first American operas, it was to have been performed on April 20, 1762 in Philadelphia but was cancelled at the last moment.

Samuel Adler reconstructed the score for a performance on October 29, 1976 at the Library of Congress in Washington, as part of the Bicentennial celebrations of the United States of America. A critic published a lukewarm review of the performance at the time.

== Selected liner notes from first recording, 1976 ==
TV-S 34650 The Disappointment (1767) America's First Ballad Opera by Andrew Barton

Musical Setting by Samuel Adler Research by Jerald Graue and Judith Layng Produced by Donald Hunsberger Directed by Edward Berkeley Musical Direction by Robert Spillman

Original Cast of the Library of Congress Eastman School of Music Production

In April 1767, the Philadelphia public was primed for a theatrical event of uncommon interest. The most illustrious acting company in the colonies, David Douglass’ American Company, was preparing Andrew Barton's ballad opera, The Disappointment, or, the Force of Credulity, for presentation at the handsome new Southwark Theatre. English plays and comic or sentimental operas had formed the staple repertoire of the company for some years, but Barton's farce had signal im¬portance because it was the first ballad opera written by an American for American audiences. Moreover, its subject matter was closely linked to the concerns of the Philadelphia citizenry. It cleverly satirized the government of King George, but it also offered lampoons of several individuals living in Philadelphia at that time.

Alas, perhaps the comic barbs were too sharp and too close to home; the opera was not performed as planned, and a terse explanatory note in the Pennsylvania Gazette of April 22 announced that the play's “personal reflections” rendered it “unfit for the stage.” It still seems remarkable that Barton's vivacious comedy could have remained un¬produced for more than two hundred years, especially since historians have long recognized the play's intrinsic merit. The reasons for this dormancy must be sought in the peculiar nature of ballad operas in the 18th century. Such works often became modest best-sellers as published librettos, and indeed Barton's opera sold impressively in this form, first when it was published in New York in 1767, then later when a revised Philadelphia version appeared in 1796. However, the librettos contain no music whatever; the songs that occur throughout the play exist as texts only, along with the titles of the popular songs whose tunes would have been used for the songs in the play. Presumably, the musical arrangements for The Disappointment were discarded upon its cancellation or have been lost during the many years since. While librettos could be printed in many copies, musical arrangements typically were made in one copy only, for one particular production. Consequently, scores or parts for ballad operas have vanished in all except a mere handful of cases.

A reconstruction of the music for The Disappointment is desirable above all because the play is manifestly attractive, but also because it is a significant landmark in the history of the American musical theatre. Aside from its position as the earliest indigenous American opera it is believed to contain the earliest mention of the time honored tune, “Yankee Doodle.” -

To mark the 200th birthday of the United States, the Music Division of the Library of Congress and the University of Rochester's Eastman School of Music chose to sponsor the reconstruction and production of this first American opera. The task of creating a musical complement for the play was undertaken by Samuel Adler and Jerald Graue of the Eastman School, in a composer-scholar collaboration, and their work was materially facilitated by the investigations of Judith Layng of Hiram College. The principal problems of the reconstruction fell into three general areas: the identification of the tunes themselves in early sources, the creation, of stylistically appropriate settings, and the determination of the size and make-up of the orchestra. In each problem area, two central requirements were regarded as paramount—that the new musical settings should be informed by the flavor and conditions of the opera's 18th-century origins, and that the final product should sacrifice none of the charm, vitality, and immediacy that were the hallmarks of ballad opera during the colonial period. This recording presents the newly created musical portion of The Disappointment, and Barton's entertaining theatre piece may finally begin to reach its intended public.

== Cast ==
- Quadrant—Milford Fargo
- Washball—John Maloy
- Parchment—Arden Hopkin
- McSnip—Richard Hudson
- Rattletrap—William Sharp
- Topinlift—Richard Reif
- Raccoon—Joseph Bias
- Moll Placket—Elaine Bonazzi
- Miss Lucy-Ruth Weniger-Denison
- Meanwell- Tonio DiPaolo

== Synopsis ==
=== Act I ===
Scene 1 Three of the humorists meet in a tavern to discuss the forged documents and fabricated story that will convince the dupes that the location of one of Blackbeard's treasures has been discovered. Rattletrap, designated to impersonate a conjurer, joins the others before the dupes arrive. The dupes are then cleverly drawn into the conspiracy, and they delight at the prospect of such a windfall. (Opening Song, Airs 1-3)

Scene 2. Trushoop, who has been keeping late hours in order to plan for the recovery of the treasure, finds himself locked out of his own house at night. His wife has little sympathy for his plight, since Trushoop's vow of secrecy has left his tardiness unexplained.

Scene 3. Moll Placket has no difficulty in prying the secret of the treasure from her keeper, Raccoon. She in turn decides that she will desert him as soon as he has made her wealthy. (Airs 4 and 5)

Scene 4. Hum, Quadrant, and Rattletrap confer in a street to ensure that all preparations for the treasure hunt have been made, including a spectacular phony display of magic by Rattletrap.

Scene 5. McSnip abuses and insults the employees at his tailor's shop, since he anticipates that he will have little use for them in the future. (Air 6)

Scene 6. Lucy and Meanwell find their marriage plans obstructed, because Washball has suddenly decided that a rich man's niece might find a more suitable mate. Washball arrives and drives Meanwell from his house. (Air 7)

Scene 7, The humorists and dupes together make final preparations for their nighttime treasure hunt. Each member of the party declares his readiness and courage in the face of the anticipated dangers. (Airs 3-10)

=== Act II ===
Scene I. Moll Placket is pleasantly occupied with a sailor, Topinlift, when Raccoon returns home unexpectedly. The sailor hides under the bed, but Raccoon's suspicions are aroused. Topinlift finally manages an escape when Moll pretends that she is conjuring up a beneficent spirit to aid Raccoon in his quest for the treasure. (Airs 11-13)

Scene 2. The search party reaches the place where the treasure is buried. Rattletrap impresses the dupes with a mock ritual that is supposed to divine the location of the chest and free the treasure from the spirits of the dead. The dupes, thoroughly frightened but still determined, finally raise the chest from the earth and agree to carry it to Washball's house, where the treasure can be divided on the following day. (Air 14)

Scene 3. Meanwell persuades Lucy to marry him despite her uncle's objections. (Air 15)

Scene 4. Washball decides to increase his share of the treasure by informing the king's tax collector of the discovery. The wealth could then be divided between Washball and the king. The collector agrees to appear at Washball's house.

Scene 5. The treasure hunters gather at Washball's home and are astonished when Washball appears with the king's agent. Hum secretly informs the collector of the nature of the prank, while the rest of the group angrily berates Washball for betraying his fellows. The chest is pried open, and its contents are revealed—bricks and stones. The dupes are despondent. Their aspirations are dashed, and their gullibility is now a public spectacle. The situation is eased by the appearance of Lucy and Meanwell, who have just been married and now seek Washball's blessing. The dupes all repent of their foolishness and resolve to live better lives in the future. (Airs 16-15 and a Country dance)

Epilogue. The principal characters appear on the stage, some singing fragments of songs, and each comments on the play's reception by the audience. (Closing Song)
