= North Tonawanda, New York =

North Tonawanda
- City
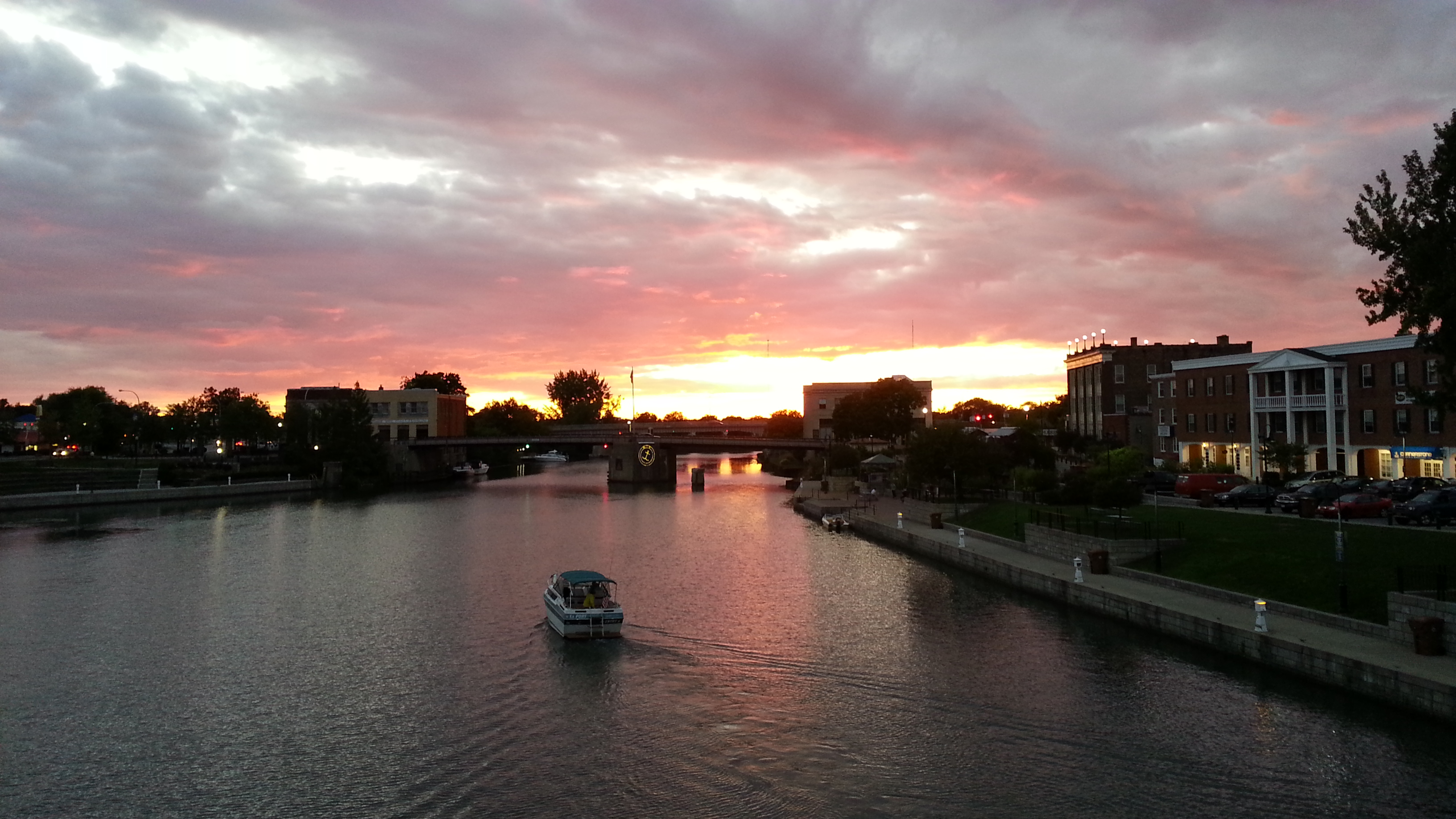
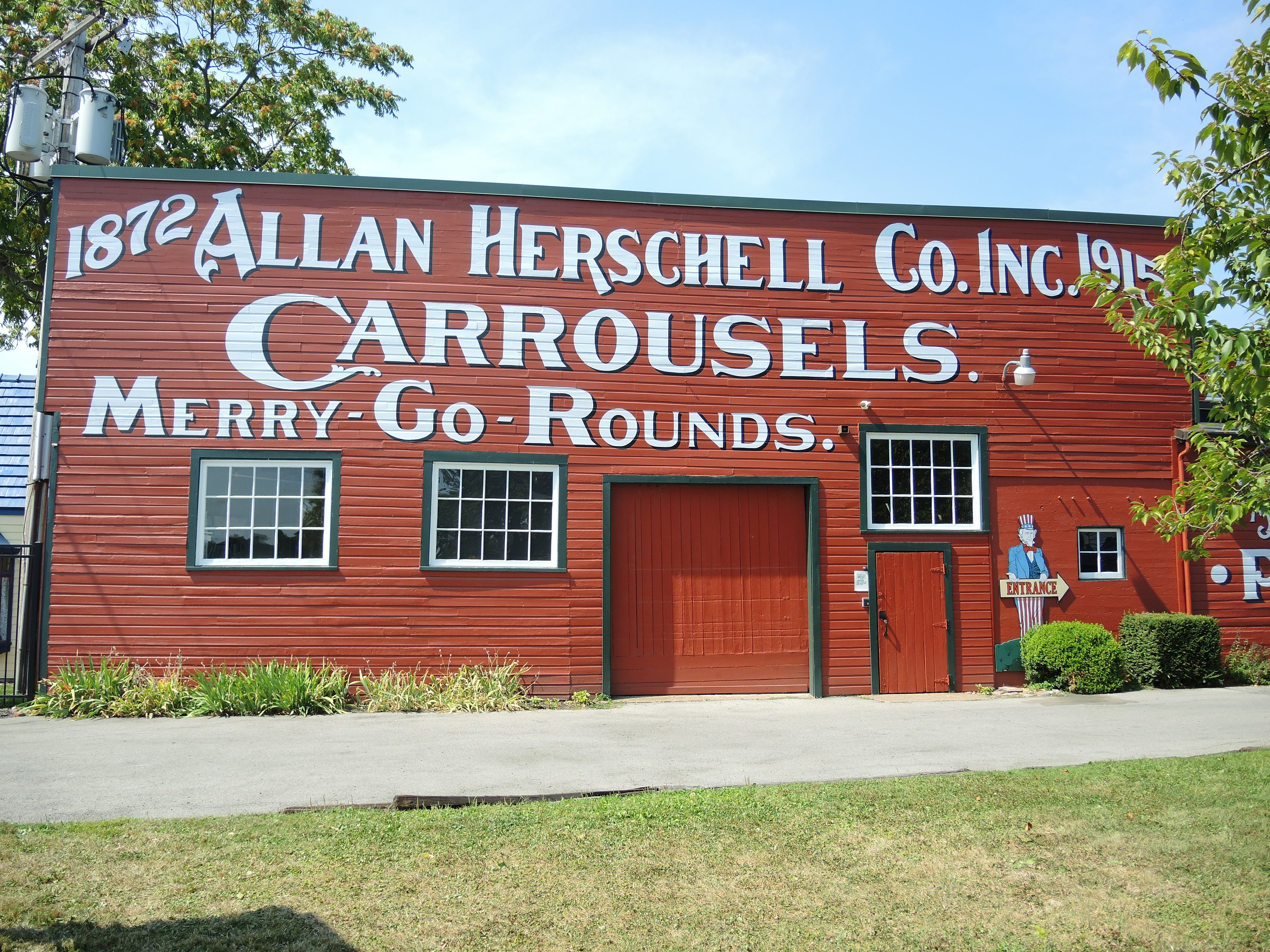
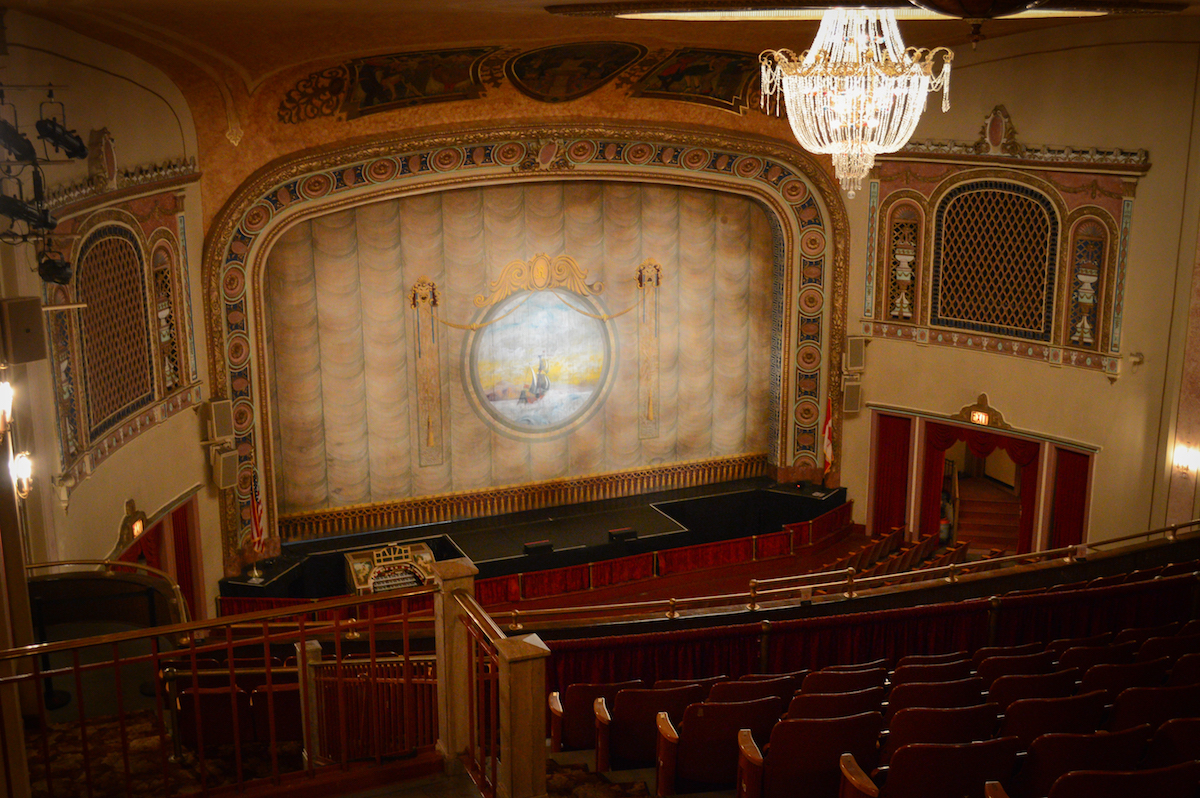
- Left to right from top: Gateway Harbor, Herschell Carrousel Factory Museum, Riviera Theatre
- Nickname: N.T.
- Location in Niagara County and the state of New York
- Coordinates: 43°2′28″N 78°52′8″W
- Country: United States
- State: New York
- County: Niagara

Government
  - Type: Mayor-Council
  - Mayor: Austin J. Tylec (D)

Area
  - Total: 10.90 sq mi (28.22 km^{2})
  - Land: 10.09 sq mi (26.14 km^{2})
  - Water: 0.80 sq mi (2.08 km^{2})
- Elevation: 574 ft (175 m)

Population (2020)
  - Total: 30,496
  - Density: 3,021.5/sq mi (1,166.62/km^{2})
- Time zone: UTC-5 (Eastern (EST))
  - Summer (DST): UTC-4 (EDT)
- ZIP code: 14120
- Area code: 716
- FIPS code: 36-53682
- GNIS feature ID: 0958935
- Website: City website

North Tonawanda is a city in Niagara County, New York, United States. As of the 2020 census, North Tonawanda had a population of 30,496. It is part of the Buffalo-Niagara Falls metropolitan area. The city is named after Tonawanda Creek, its southern border.

Tonawanda in the Seneca language means "swift-running water". Tonawanda Creek, which flows into the Niagara River, once had large stretches of rapids (see Rapids, New York) until it was tamed with the construction of the Erie Canal.

The city also calls itself the "Lumber City," due to its past primary industry, and it once was the largest port on the Great Lakes during the height of the Erie Canal. Along Goundry Street are mansions built for the lumber barons, including 208 Goundry Street, called Kent Place, designed by Stanford White. Many of the local residents refer to the city as the "Jewel of Niagara County" due to its geographical setting between the Niagara River and Erie Canal. Street signs on the borders of town welcome visitors to the "Home of the Carousel".

== History ==
After the first settlers arrived in 1809, North Tonawanda became part of the town of Wheatfield, New York, in Niagara County, from May 1836. An abortive attempt at a village containing portions in two counties and two towns from January 1854 until April 1857, it was part of the Niagara County/Town of Wheatfield component, with the other portion in Erie County and the Town of Tonawanda. The experiment was abandoned after New York removed the village's North Tonawanda component. Oral history claims a dispute between merchants was the cause, but the combination of communities in two counties and two towns was unwieldy. After becoming a village on May 8, 1865 (still in the Town of Wheatfield, but as part of Martinsville, New York), North Tonawanda was incorporated as a city on April 24, 1897.

North Tonawanda is on the north side of the Erie Canal/Tonawanda Creek, across from Erie County, New York, and the communities of the City of Tonawanda and the Town of Amherst. The Town of Wheatfield borders North Tonawanda on the north and east; the Niagara River serves as its western border, as Tonawanda Creek is its southern border. North Tonawanda is the second-largest city in Niagara County, after Niagara Falls, New York.

North Tonawanda is known as the Lumber City, because it was from the mid-19th century through the 1970s, a lumber transportation and forwarding center of significance because of the ready availability of lumber. It was the birthplace of the Herschell-Spillman Company/Allan Herschell Co., one of the leading manufacturers of carousels in America, and is now the home of the Herschell Carrousel Factory Museum. In 1888, Herschell attracted expatriate Belgian Eugene de Kleist to North Tonawanda, who started the North Tonawanda Barrel Organ Factory to produce band organs. Taken over in 1909 by the Rudolph Wurlitzer Company after De Kleist became mayor of North Tonawanda in 1906, Wurlitzer became one of the largest musical instrument-manufacturing plants in the world. The Ray H. Bennett Lumber Co., one of more than 150 lumber companies to have called North Tonawanda home, produced kit homes sold around the US and Canada for 70 years. Richardson Boat, Buffalo Bolt, Durez Chemical, National Grinding Wheel, Taylor Devices, International Paper, Tonawanda Iron and Steel, Riverside Chemical, and hundreds of other successful manufacturing businesses called North Tonawanda home.

The Railroad Museum of the Niagara Frontier occupies a 1923 Erie Railroad station on Oliver Street. The Riviera Theater and Performing Arts Center on Webster Street, in a restored Italian Renaissance-style building, features plays, concerts, movies, and other events, and its 1926 "Mighty Wurlitzer" organ is featured in monthly organ concerts. The theater is one of only a handful in the United States with projectors capable of showing nitrate film prints in common use before about 1951. The Ghostlight Theatre is a community theater in a century-old church. The former Carnegie Library is home to the Carnegie Art Center. An E. B. Green-designed building houses the Buffalo Suzuki Strings Musical Arts Center. An active arts community has developed in the downtown area as well. The North Tonawanda History Museum no longer occupies the former G. C. Murphy Co. store building on Webster Street in the heart of the downtown historic district.

Parks in North Tonawanda include Veteran's Park, which has a monument to U.S. Seabees and one to the U.S. Marines, and is working on one to Vietnam War Veterans; Gateway Harbor Park, along the Erie Canal, the site of the annual Canal Fest in July and free concerts and other activities; the 53-acre (210,000 m^{2}) Gratwick-Riverside Park along the Niagara River; and Pine Woods Park, Mayor's Park, and the North Tonawanda Botanical Gardens with a boat launch.

The Buffalo Norsemen played their home games in North Tonawanda during their existence.

== Geography ==
North Tonawanda is located at 43°2′28″N 78°52′8″W (43.041006, -78.868920).

The Erie Canal defines the southern and the majority of the eastern borders of the city, with the rest of the eastern border made up of Sweeney Street and Old Falls Boulevard. Niagara Falls Boulevard (US Route 62) defines the northeastern border of the city. The majority of the northern border of the city is a line that runs east-west just above Forbes Terrace, mostly paralleling Ruie Road, with the rest of the northern border being a short northwesterly line that runs from Ward Road to Witmer Road. The western edge of the city is defined by the Niagara River and a line that runs just west of and parallel to Witmer Road. Also, at the southwest corner of the city is Tonawanda Island, which is separated from the mainland by the Little River (Part of the East Branch of the Niagara River) and is part of the city.

The edge of North Tonawanda is sometimes hard to find, because the southern parts of both the Towns of Wheatfield and Pendleton use the same zip code as North Tonawanda, 14120.

=== Climate ===
Climate data for North Tonawanda, New York (1991–2020 normals, extremes 1982–present)
Month	Jan	Feb	Mar	Apr	May	Jun	Jul	Aug	Sep	Oct	Nov	Dec	Year
Record high °F (°C)	66 (19)	74 (23)	82 (28)	93 (34)	94 (34)	95 (35)	100 (38)	97 (36)	95 (35)	87 (31)	80 (27)	72 (22)	100 (38)
Mean maximum °F (°C)	55.1 (12.8)	55.2 (12.9)	66.9 (19.4)	79.2 (26.2)	86.1 (30.1)	90.2 (32.3)	91.2 (32.9)	90.3 (32.4)	87.3 (30.7)	78.8 (26.0)	67.7 (19.8)	56.5 (13.6)	93.0 (33.9)
Mean daily maximum °F (°C)	33.2 (0.7)	35.5 (1.9)	44.1 (6.7)	56.9 (13.8)	69.8 (21.0)	78.8 (26.0)	82.8 (28.2)	81.5 (27.5)	74.3 (23.5)	61.2 (16.2)	49.2 (9.6)	38.0 (3.3)	58.8 (14.9)
Daily mean °F (°C)	24.9 (−3.9)	26.2 (−3.2)	34.0 (1.1)	45.2 (7.3)	57.2 (14.0)	66.9 (19.4)	70.9 (21.6)	69.7 (20.9)	62.4 (16.9)	50.8 (10.4)	40.0 (4.4)	30.6 (−0.8)	48.2 (9.0)
Mean daily minimum °F (°C)	16.7 (−8.5)	16.9 (−8.4)	23.8 (−4.6)	33.5 (0.8)	44.6 (7.0)	55.0 (12.8)	59.1 (15.1)	57.8 (14.3)	50.4 (10.2)	40.4 (4.7)	30.7 (−0.7)	23.1 (−4.9)	37.7 (3.2)
Mean minimum °F (°C)	−0.6 (−18.1)	0.4 (−17.6)	7.4 (−13.7)	22.2 (−5.4)	32.2 (0.1)	42.4 (5.8)	49.6 (9.8)	47.9 (8.8)	37.4 (3.0)	27.8 (−2.3)	18.4 (−7.6)	7.1 (−13.8)	−4.0 (−20.0)
Record low °F (°C)	−12 (−24)	−15 (−26)	−8 (−22)	15 (−9)	25 (−4)	35 (2)	41 (5)	36 (2)	27 (−3)	21 (−6)	10 (−12)	−9 (−23)	−15 (−26)
Average precipitation inches (mm)	3.19 (81)	2.44 (62)	2.94 (75)	3.64 (92)	3.38 (86)	3.30 (84)	3.46 (88)	3.10 (79)	3.90 (99)	3.94 (100)	3.46 (88)	3.39 (86)	40.14 (1,020)
Average snowfall inches (cm)	22.9 (58)	16.1 (41)	13.1 (33)	2.7 (6.9)	0.0 (0.0)	0.0 (0.0)	0.0 (0.0)	0.0 (0.0)	0.0 (0.0)	0.5 (1.3)	6.0 (15)	18.5 (47)	79.8 (203)
Average extreme snow depth inches (cm)	9.5 (24)	9.1 (23)	7.9 (20)	1.0 (2.5)	0.0 (0.0)	0.0 (0.0)	0.0 (0.0)	0.0 (0.0)	0.0 (0.0)	0.2 (0.51)	2.4 (6.1)	6.7 (17)	13.3 (34)
Average precipitation days (≥ 0.01 in)	20.0	15.8	15.1	14.3	13.3	12.3	11.2	10.6	11.3	14.6	14.5	18.2	171.2
Average snowy days (≥ 0.1 in)	16.5	13.1	8.4	3.0	0.0	0.0	0.0	0.0	0.0	0.2	4.6	11.6	57.4
Source: NOAA

== Buildings ==
North Tonawanda is home to many historic mansions and a historic cemetery. The city has a number of properties on the National Register of Historic Places. The old Wurlitzer Organ Factory is now leased to various light industrial, high technology, and commercial businesses.

The North Tonawanda City Market, established in 1908, is the oldest farmer's market in Niagara County. It is open three days a week year-round, but is busiest in the summer and early fall, when more than 70 area farmers sell there.

=== Historic sites ===
These historic sites in North Tonawanda are of such significance as to be listed on the National Register of Historic Places.

	Site name	Image	Location	Date added
1	Riviera Theatre		67 Webster Street	March 20, 1980
2	Herschell Carrousel Factory Museum		180 Thompson St.	April 18, 1985
3	United States Post Office		141 Goundry St.	May 11, 1989
4	Carnegie Library		249 Goundry St.	July 14, 1995
5	Dick Block		62 Webster St.	November 21, 2012
6	Herschell–Spillman Motor; Company complex		184 Sweeney St.	June 5, 2013

== Demographics ==
Historical population
Census	Pop.	Note	%±
1880	1,492		—
1890	4,793		221.2%
1900	9,069		89.2%
1910	11,955		31.8%
1920	15,482		29.5%
1930	19,019		22.8%
1940	20,254		6.5%
1950	24,731		22.1%
1960	34,757		40.5%
1970	36,012		3.6%
1980	35,760		−0.7%
1990	34,989		−2.2%
2000	33,262		−4.9%
2010	31,568		−5.1%
2020	30,496		−3.4%
U.S. Decennial Census

=== 2020 census ===
As of the 2020 census, North Tonawanda had a population of 30,496. The median age was 43.9 years. 17.8% of residents were under the age of 18 and 20.5% of residents were 65 years of age or older. For every 100 females there were 97.2 males, and for every 100 females age 18 and over there were 96.0 males age 18 and over.

100.0% of residents lived in urban areas, while 0.0% lived in rural areas.

There were 14,108 households in North Tonawanda, of which 21.8% had children under the age of 18 living in them. Of all households, 39.9% were married-couple households, 22.4% were households with a male householder and no spouse or partner present, and 29.5% were households with a female householder and no spouse or partner present. About 36.5% of all households were made up of individuals and 14.4% had someone living alone who was 65 years of age or older.

There were 15,087 housing units, of which 6.5% were vacant. The homeowner vacancy rate was 0.8% and the rental vacancy rate was 7.5%.

Racial composition as of the 2020 census
Race	Number	Percent
White	27,988	91.8%
Black or African American	462	1.5%
American Indian and Alaska Native	157	0.5%
Asian	220	0.7%
Native Hawaiian and Other Pacific Islander	8	0.0%
Some other race	234	0.8%
Two or more races	1,427	4.7%
Hispanic or Latino (of any race)	946	3.1%

=== 2000 census ===
As of the 2000 census, 33,262 people, 13,671 households, and 8,981 families were residing in the city. The population density was 3,293.2 inhabitants per square mile (1,271.5/km^{2}). The 14,425 housing units had an average density of 1,428.2 per square mile (551.4/km^{2}). The racial makeup of the city was 97.86% White, 0.29% African American, 0.34% Native American, 0.53% Asian, 0.30% from other races, and 0.68% from two or more races. Hispanics or Latinos of any race were 1.09% of the population.

Of the 13,671 households, 30.2% had children under 18 living with them, 50.8% were married couples living together, 11.1% had a female householder with no husband present, and 34.3% were not families. About 29.5% of all households were made up of individuals, and 12.8% had someone living alone who was 65 or older. The average household size was 2.43 and the average family size was 3.03.

In the city, the age distribution was 23.7% under 18, 8.6% from 18 to 24, 28.9% from 25 to 44, 23.1% from 45 to 64, and 15.6% who were 65 or older. The median age was 38 years. For every 100 females, there were 94.6 males. For every 100 females 18 and over, there were 90.6 males.

The median income for a household in the city was $39,154, and for a family was $50,219. Males had a median income of $36,551 versus $25,129 for females. The per capita income for the city was $19,264. 7.2% of the population and 5.4% of families were below the poverty line. Of the total people living in poverty, 9.1% were under 18 and 6.1% were 65 or older.

== Schools ==
The public schools of North Tonawanda are the North Tonawanda High School, North Tonawanda Middle School, Drake Elementary School, North Tonawanda Intermediate School, Spruce Elementary School, and Ohio Elementary School.

== Essential services ==
- North Tonawanda City School District
- North Tonawanda Police Department
- North Tonawanda Public Library
- DeGraff Memorial Hospital, part of Kaleida Health
- North Tonawanda Fire Department (Combination Fire Dept): The department consists of 38 full-time career firefighters and volunteer firefighters from the Columbia Hook and Ladder Co. #1, Active Hose Co. #2, Live Hose Co. #4, Rescue Fire Co. #5, Gratwick Hose Co. #6, and the Sweeney Hose Co. #7. The NTFD has five stations and six apparatuses - three engines, a ladder truck, a light rescue, and a command car. Staffing consists of four platoons.

== Notable people ==
- Ted Barrett, MLB umpire
- Rudy Bozak, notable engineer
- Cindy Bradley, jazz trumpet player
- Jim Britton, retired MLB pitcher
- Rita Kogler Carver, studio designer
- Eugene de Kleist, organ builder
- Maryalice Demler, former Miss New York
- Tonio di Paolo, opera singer
- Phil Fasciana, death metal guitarist
- Ed Harmon, professional football player
- Bret Hoffmann, death metal vocalist
- Jim Hurtubise, automobile racer
- Edward C. Kuhn, U.S. military coat-of-arms designer
- William Larson, photographer
- Robert Mangold, artist
- George D. Maziarz, politician
- Bernard Joseph McLaughlin, auxiliary bishop of Buffalo Diocese
- Hans Oldag, German-born American long-distance runner
- Jamin Olivencia, professional wrestler
- John Olszowka, historian
- Robert G. Ortt, politician
- Gladys Parker, comic-strip artist
- Lewis S. Payne, former New York state senator
- Roman Piskor, NFL football player
- James Rand Jr., industrialist
- Stan Rojek, MLB player
- Geoff Sanderson, former NHL player
- Paul Schaus, sledge hockey gold medalist
- Robin Schimminger, politician
- Don Smith, Olympic rower
- Henry P. Smith III, politician
- Paul Van Arsdale, hammered dulcimer player
- Andy Williams, guitarist in Every Time I Die

== See also ==
- Tonawanda (disambiguation)
