= George Festeryga =

Profile
- Positions: Running back, Defensive back, Quarterback

Personal information
- Born: July 31, 1926; Hamilton, Ontario, Canada
- Died: January 7, 2010 (aged 83); Port Perry, Ontario, Canada
- Listed height: 5 ft 11 in (1.80 m)
- Listed weight: 182 lb (83 kg)

Career history
- 1947–1948: Hamilton Tigers
- 1949: Montreal Alouettes
- 1950: Saskatchewan Roughriders
- 1951–1952: Edmonton Eskimos

Awards and highlights
- Grey Cup champion (1949)

George Festeryga (July 31, 1926 – January 7, 2010) was a Grey Cup champion Canadian Football League player.

A graduate of the Hamilton Tigers junior and senior program, the big and talented Festeryga joined the Montreal Alouettes in 1949. Playing 9 regular season games, he was an integral part of their first Grey Cup championship. He later played for the Saskatchewan Roughriders and finished his career in 1952 after 2 seasons with the Edmonton Eskimos.

He later became a breeder of Appaloosa horses and Murray Grey cattle.
