= Prince George, Duke of Cumberland =

Prince George, Duke of Cumberland may refer to either of the following two British princes:

- Prince George of Denmark, the first British Royal Consort
- George V of Hanover, a grandchild of George III of the United Kingdom
