= Mrs. Pack =

English wet nurse to the son of future Queen Anne

Mrs. Pack (died 1694) was a wet nurse to the infant William, Duke of Gloucester (1689–1700); she was believed indispensable to the boy's health, and because of that, came to exercise considerable control over the household of his mother, the future Queen Anne. She has been called a forerunner of the British nanny.

== Background ==
After the Glorious Revolution of 1688, which deposed James II of England and VII of Scotland, Mary II of England came to the throne with her husband William III. The couple, first cousins, was childless. Her younger sister, Princess Anne, married to Prince George of Denmark, her second cousin, had repeatedly attempted to have children, but had had a succession of miscarriages and short-lived daughters. Were Queen Mary and Princess Anne to die childless, Parliament would have to make provision for the succession, as all other near heirs were Catholic and thus unacceptable. Should Parliament do so, its choice might not be seen as legitimate by some, and the legitimacy of the succession might be questioned, with revolt possible. It was seen as far preferable that one of Anne's children take the throne after the death of their mother, should the King and Queen not have children themselves. The birth in 1689 of a boy, William Henry, soon made Duke of Gloucester by his uncle and aunt, was a source of expectation and hope.

== Discovery of a wet nurse ==
With the birth of Prince William, all precautions known at that time were taken. Doctors were in constant attendance on the young royal duke. Prayers were said for him almost continuously. Nonetheless, the infant duke failed to thrive, and had convulsions. Wet nurses were commonly used, especially for well-to-do women who could not (or did not want to) breast-feed their children themselves, and one was sought who might succor the young Duke of Gloucester. Three different wet nurses were tried in turn; each was judged unsatisfactory.

The unsatisfactory nurses were paid five guineas apiece, a huge sum, and an even larger reward was announced for one who might save the heir. At this, country women converged on Hampton Court Palace. Among them was Mrs. Pack, a Quaker from Kingston Wick. As she sat in the Presence Room with her one-month-old child, Prince George passed by and noticed her because of "her breasts, which were gigantic". He ordered Mrs. Pack to go in to his son, and to feed him. She did so, and whether because of that, or for some other reason, the baby recovered.

== Servant and later life ==
With the life of the second-in-line to the throne apparently depending on Mrs. Pack and her milk, she had immense power in the royal household. Orders were given that she was not to be contradicted. Already a heavy woman, she devoted herself to food and drink. When the Princess's household removed to Craven House in Kensington for the better air, Mrs. Pack was given entire control of the nursery wing. She managed to preserve her power past the weaning of the Duke, but could not win the boy's affection. She died when he was aged five, and Queen Mary asked her nephew if he was sorry at her death. "No, Ma'am," he replied.

The son she had with her when she came to Hampton Court was fostered with the royal family, and Joel Pack became a clerk to the Admiralty. Author Jonathan Gathorne-Hardy, taking note of the authority she had over the nursery, considered her to be a prototype of the English nanny.

== Cited works ==
- Gathorne-Hardy, Jonathan (1972), The Rise and Fall of the British Nanny, Arrow Books Ltd., ISBN 978-0-340-12679-0, OCLC 595798
