= Blood ritual =

Any ritual that involves the intentional release of blood

A blood ritual is any ritual that involves the intentional release of blood.

== Description ==
Some blood rituals involve two or more parties cutting themselves or each other followed by the consumption of blood. The participants may regard the release or consumption of blood as producing energy useful as a sexual, healing, or mental stimulus. In other cases, blood is a primary component as the sacrifice, or material component for a spell. Blood rituals are practiced by various groups of people, including those with religious or political affiliations. Some of the rituals involving blood have been practiced for many centuries, and are still being practiced in the 21st century.

Blood rituals often involve a symbolic death and rebirth, as literal bodily birth involves bleeding. Blood is typically seen as very powerful, and sometimes as unclean. Blood sacrifice is sometimes considered by the practitioners of prayer, ritual magic, and spell casting to intensify the power of such activities.

== Aztecs ==
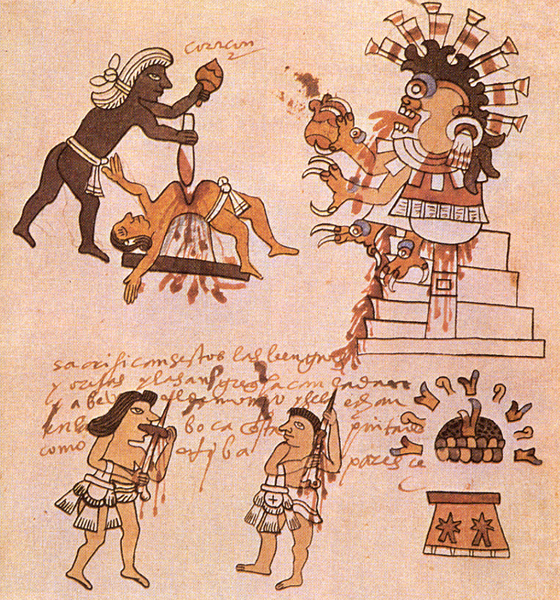
The Aztec priests regularly performed religious rituals of offering still-beating hearts to the gods. The two people below pierce their tongues and ear in a religious ceremony.

The Aztecs participated in blood rituals around 500 years ago. The blood in the rituals has a symbolic meaning, depending on the group and ritual being performed.

Around 1376 to 1521 AD, Aztecs used blood and sacrifice frequently as an offering to the Sun God. The Aztecs saw death as part of life, just like birth. They believed the gods sacrificed their own blood to create the universe, so in turn, the Aztecs offered blood to the Gods as a sort of reciprocal exchange and gift for their creations. Furthermore, the supply of ritual blood was believed to maintain plentiful fertile crops and aid in the continuation of the Aztec world. The author Jasmyne Pendragon, who has a bachelor of archaeology, stated in her article "The Purpose of Aztec Blood Rituals Part 1", that "The Aztecs lifestyles were governed by a need to supply fresh-blooded sacrificial victims to the sun god who required the hearts of men to give life to the world and assist the souls of dead warriors to the Aztecs version of heaven". The rituals maintained a relationship between Aztecs and their gods. The Aztecs believed the gods would provide plentiful crops and healthy long lives as long as blood was ritually given. If blood was not sacrificed to the gods, the humans believed they would be punished and endure excessive pain "more violent than any man could ever do".

== India ==
Some Indians practice a political ritual voluntarily where the people donate blood as a way to remember politicians who have died. The blood donation is literally a donation to people who need transfusions The participants donate at donation camps during the birthday or the anniversary of the politician's death. Jacob Copeman, a lecturer in social anthropology at the University of Edinburgh in Scotland, states in his article "Blood Will Have Blood: A Study in Indian Political Ritual" that Prime Minister Indira Gandhi and Rajiv Gandhi are the two politicians who are mainly "remembered" during the blood donations. These two politicians were assassinated and seen as dying for India, or important individuals who "…shed their blood for the nation". According to Copeman, in a speech Indira Gandhi made in 1984, she "…strikingly associated her blood with the health of the nation. Her blood would continue to nurture the nation even after her death…". The reason behind the donation is to keep life going or to give the individuals receiving the blood more time to live. The reason why the politicians are involved with this is because the donors are making a connection with the dead, symbolizing the blood being donated to the blood of the politician being honored. This is important because even though these people died, they are still helping preserve life, by the people of India donating blood in their honor.

== Other regions ==
Some radical movements among Shi’ite Muslims practiced a ritual called Matam in 2002 in Britain. However, this practice in popular culture of Shi'ite Muslim communities is considered excessive, violent, and wrong.

Body piercing can also be part of a blood ritual, as it can result in the release of blood. Piercing has been practiced in a number of indigenous cultures throughout the world, usually as a symbolic rite of passage, a symbolic death and rebirth, an initiation, or for reasons of magical protection.

A common blood ritual is the blood brother ritual, which began in ancient Europe and Asia. Two or more people, typically male, intermingle their blood in some way. This symbolically brings the participants together into one family. This can be an unsafe practice where blood-borne pathogens are concerned; the use of safe, sterilized equipment such as a lancet can mitigate this problem.

The Native American Sun Dance is usually accompanied by blood sacrifice.

== In the Bible ==
Blood rites are deeply embedded in both the Hebrew Bible and Christian tradition, serving as means of covenant-making, purification, sacrifice, identity, and relationship with the divine.

=== Hebrew Bible ===
Ancient Israelite rites manipulated sacrificial animal blood in various ways, sprinkling, pouring, daubing, or placing on altar horns or sacred objects, with each form shaped by legal, ritual, and symbolic concerns. One of the central theological motifs is that “the life is in the blood” (Book of Leviticus 17:11), which both grounds the prohibition against consuming blood and justifies the various rituals involving blood.

One prominent example is found in the Book of Exodus 24:3-8, which describes a covenant ceremony between God and the Israelites at Mount Sinai. The ritual described in this passage is a key example of the use and significance of blood in biblical tradition. The ritual involves the sacrifice of animals and the division of their blood into two halves, with one half sprinkled on the altar, representing God, and the other half sprinkled on the people.

Scholars like William K. Gilders trace how ritual law and narrative texts treat blood, noting that while many laws stipulate what to do with the blood, few texts explain why beyond reference to life and sacredness.

=== Christian New Testament / Theology ===
Another example of biblical blood ritual is found in John 6:54-57, in which John the Apostle recited the words of Jesus, highlighting the importance of the Eucharist for the sake of gaining eternal life. In this recitation, he explains that in order to gain everlasting life, his followers must eat his flesh and drink his blood. This was expanded upon in 1 Corinthians 10:16, in which the cup of blessing and bread are described as representations of the blood and body of Christ.

In Christian tradition, Jesus’ words at the Last Supper inaugurate a new covenant “in my blood” (e.g., Matthew 26:28; 1 Corinthians 11:25). The Eucharist ritualistically participates in this covenant, with the symbolism of Jesus’ blood standing for forgiveness, life, and relationship with God. Recent literary and ritual studies emphasize its role in forming and sustaining the Christian community.

== See also ==
- Black magic
- Blooding
