= Wet nurse =

Woman who breastfeeds and cares for another's child

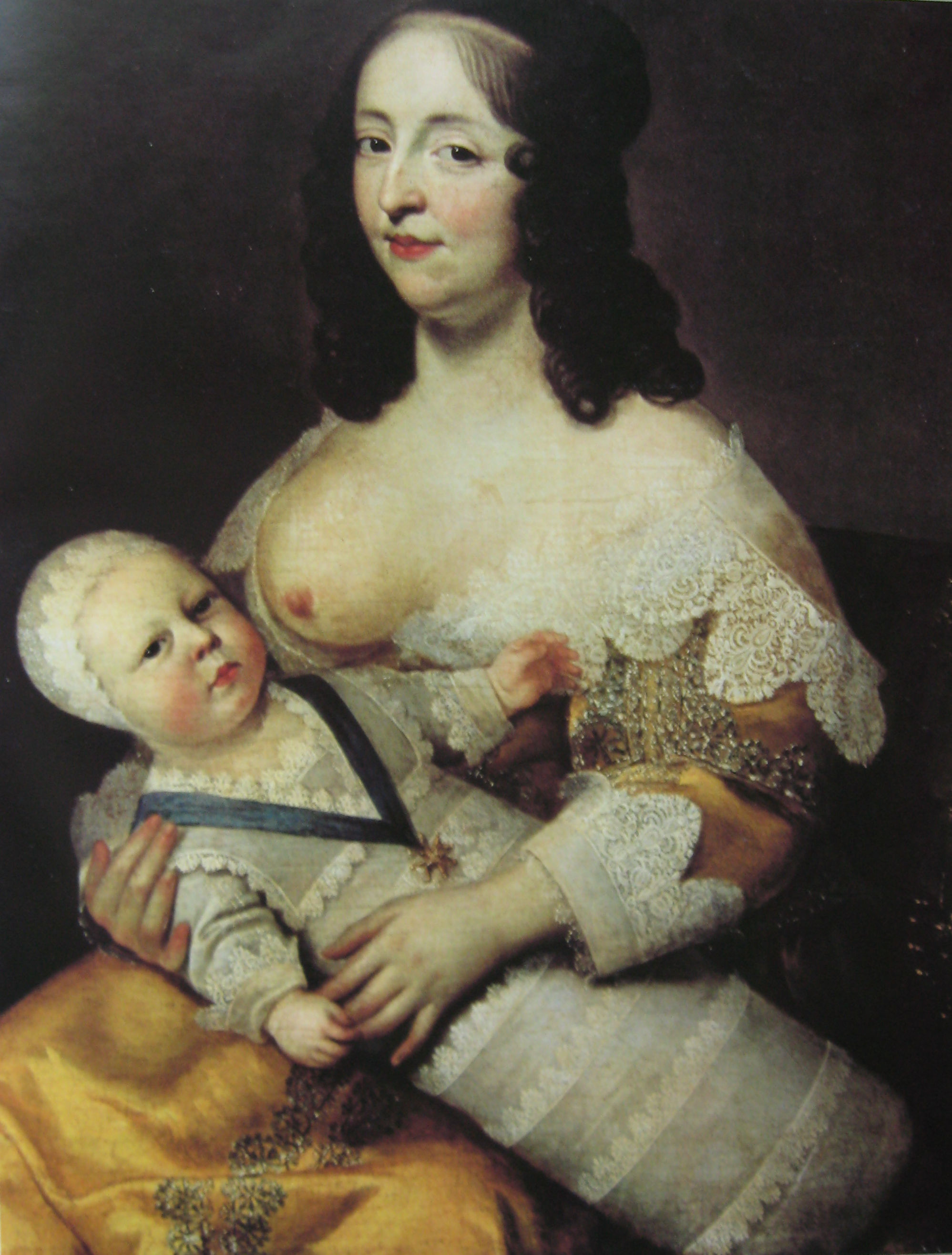
Louis XIV as an infant, with his wet nurse Longuet de la Giraudière

A wet nurse is a woman who breastfeeds and cares for another's child. Wet nurses are employed if the mother dies, if she is unable to nurse the child herself sufficiently, or if she chooses not to do so. Wet-nursed children may be known as "milk-siblings", and in some societies, the families are linked by a special relationship of milk kinship. Wet-nursing existed in societies around the world until the invention of reliable formula milk in the 20th century. The practice has made a small comeback in the 21st century.

== Reasons ==
A wet nurse can help when a mother is unable or unwilling to breastfeed her baby. Before the development of infant formula in the 20th century, wet-nursing could save a baby's life.

There are many reasons why a mother is unable to produce sufficient breast milk, or in some cases to lactate at all. For example, she may have a chronic or acute illness, and either the illness itself, or the treatment for it, reduces or stops her milk. This absence of lactation may be temporary or permanent.

There was a greater need for wet nurses when the rates of infant abandonment and maternal death, during and shortly after childbirth, were high. There was a concurrent availability of lactating women whose own babies had died.

Some women chose not to breastfeed for social reasons. For upper-class women, breastfeeding was considered unfashionable, in the sense that it not only prevented them from being able to wear the fashionable clothing of their time, but it was also thought to ruin their figures. Hiring a wet nurse was less expensive than having to hire someone else to help run the family business and/or take care of the family household duties in their place. Some women chose to hire wet nurses purely to escape from the confining and time-consuming chore of breastfeeding.

== Eliciting milk ==
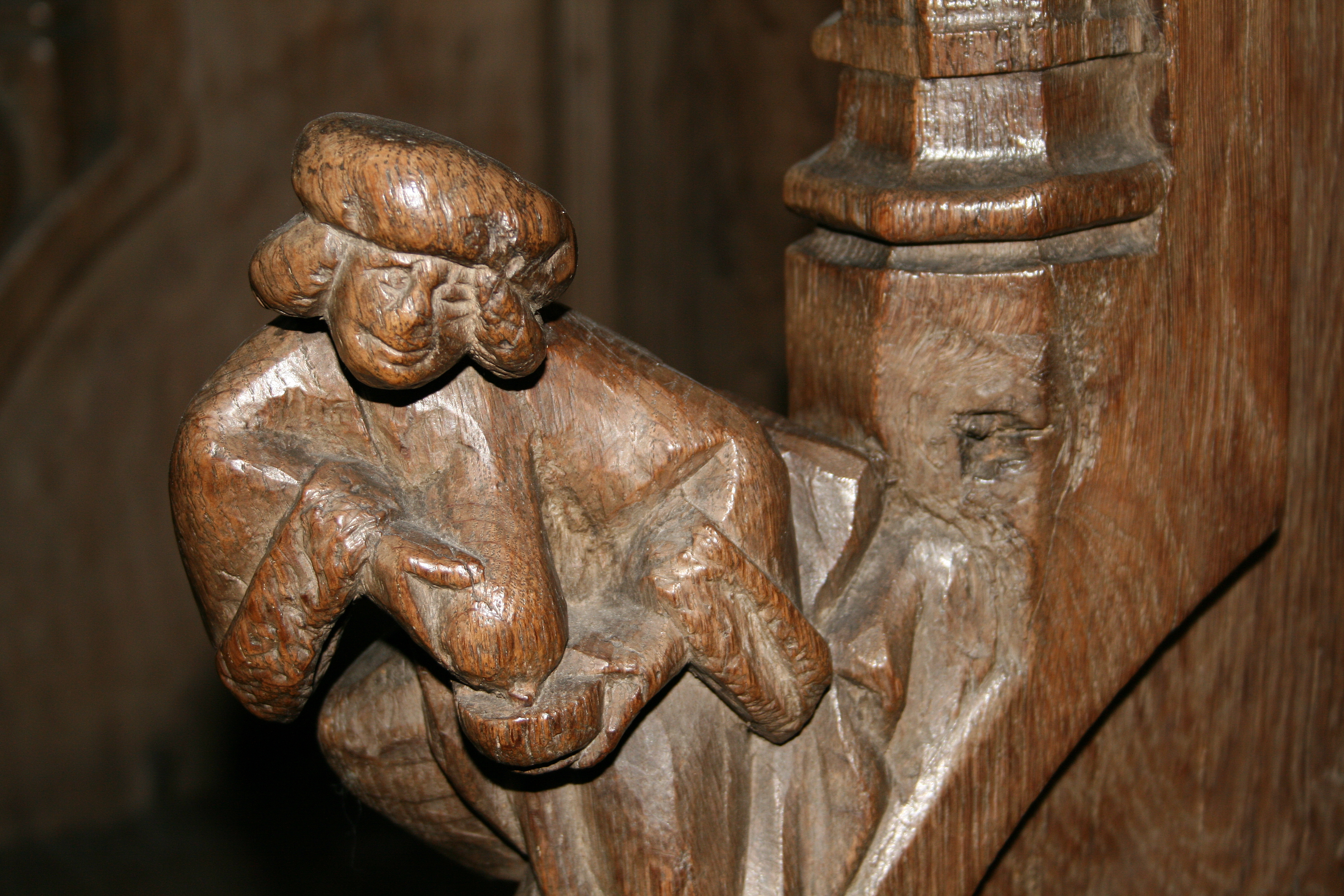
A 16th-century carving in a Belgian church, showing a woman expressing her milk into a bowl

A woman can only act as a wet nurse if she is lactating (producing milk). It was once believed that a wet nurse must have recently undergone childbirth in order to lactate. This is not necessarily the case, as regular breast stimulation can elicit lactation via a neural reflex of prolactin production and secretion. Some women have been able to establish lactation using a breast pump, in order to feed an infant.

Gabrielle Palmer, author of The Politics of Breastfeeding, states:

There is no medical reason why women should not lactate indefinitely or feed more than one child simultaneously (known as 'tandem feeding')...some women could theoretically be able to feed up to five babies.

== Historical and cultural practices ==
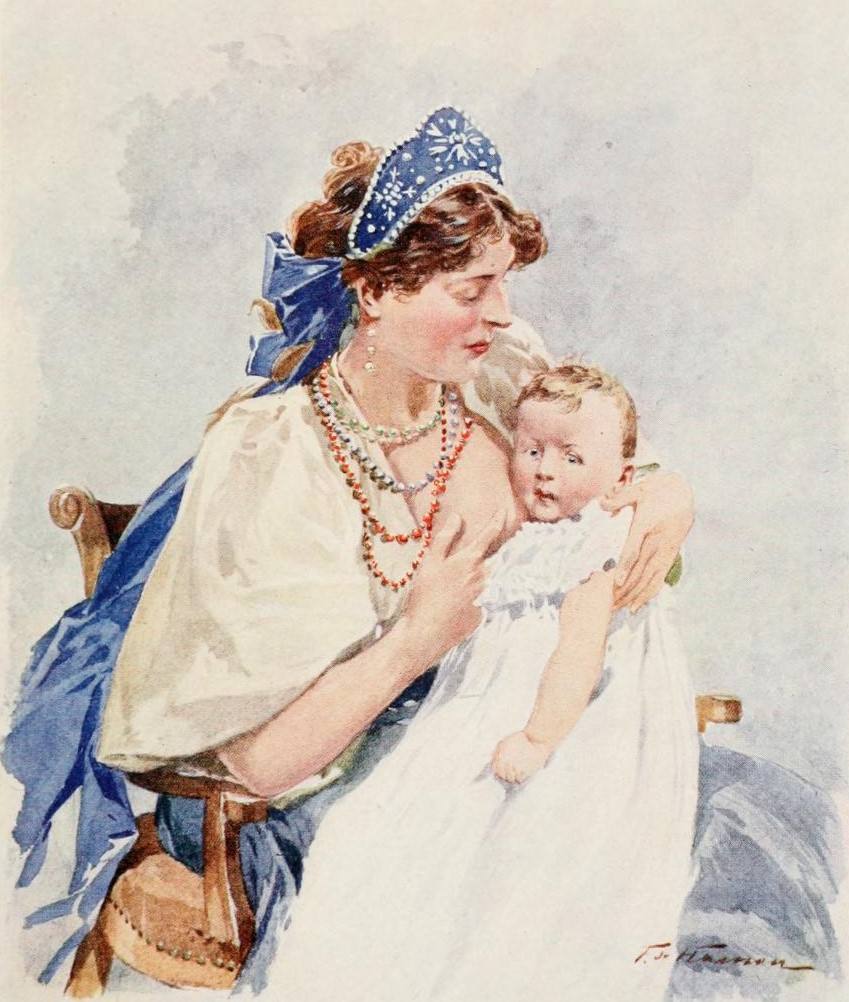
A Russian wet nurse, c. 1913

Wet nursing is an ancient practice, common to many societies. It has been linked to social class, where monarchies, the aristocracy, nobility, or upper classes had their children wet-nursed for the benefit of the child's health, and sometimes in the hope of becoming pregnant again quickly. Exclusive breastfeeding inhibits ovulation in some women (lactational amenorrhea). Poor women, especially those who suffered the stigma of giving birth to an illegitimate child, sometimes had to give their baby up temporarily to a wet nurse, or permanently to another family. The woman herself might in turn become wet nurse to a wealthier family, while using part of her wages to pay her own child's wet nurse.

In pre-modern times, it was incorrectly believed that wet nurses could pass on personality traits to infants, such as acquired characteristics.

=== Mythology ===
Many cultures feature stories, historical or mythological, involving superhuman, supernatural, human, and in some instances, animal wet nurses. The Bible refers to Deborah, a nurse to Rebekah, wife of Isaac and mother of Jacob (Israel) and Esau. In Greek mythology, Eurycleia is the wet nurse of Odysseus. In Roman mythology, Caieta was the wet nurse of Aeneas. In Burmese mythology, Myaukhpet Shinma is the nat (spirit) representation of the wet nurse of King Tabinshwehti. In Hawaiian mythology, Nuakea is a beneficent goddess of lactation; her name became the title for a royal wet nurse, according to David Malo.

The importance of the wet nurse to ancient Roman culture is indicated by the founding myth of Romulus and Remus, who were abandoned as infants but nursed by the she-wolf, as portrayed in the Capitoline Wolf bronze sculpture. The goddess Rumina was invoked among other birth and child development deities to promote the flow of breast milk.

=== Ancient Rome ===
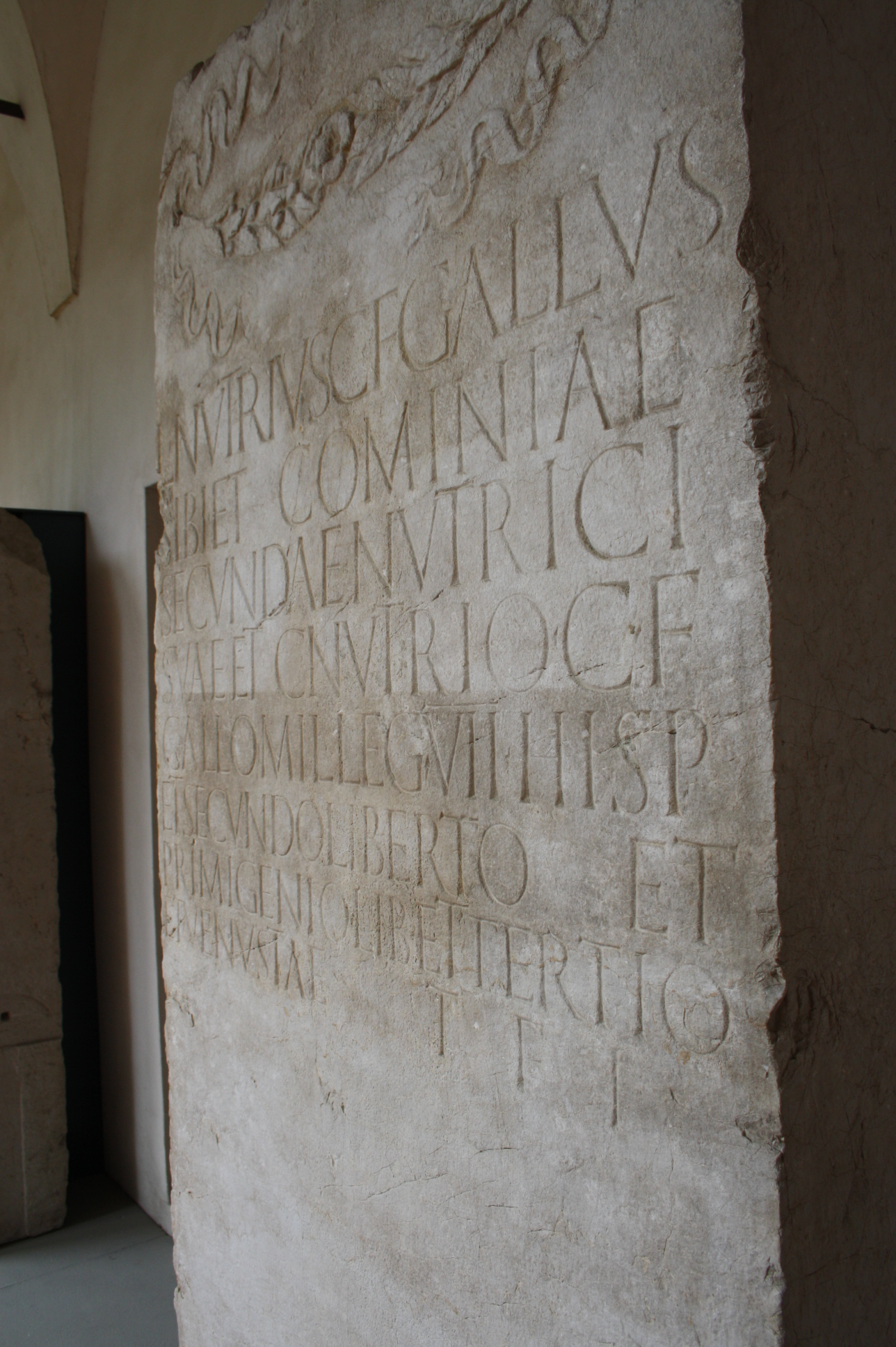
A funerary stele (akin to a gravestone) erected by Roman citizen Lucius Nutrius Gallus in the 2nd half of the 1st century AD for himself, his wet nurse, and other members of his family and household

In ancient Rome, well-to-do households would have had wet nurses (Latin nutrices, singular nutrix) among their slaves and freedwomen, but some Roman women were wet nurses by profession, and the Digest of Roman law even refers to a wage dispute for wet-nursing services (nutricia). The landmark known as the Columna Lactaria ("Milk Column") may have been a place where wet nurses could be hired. It was considered admirable for upperclass women to breastfeed their own children, but unusual and old-fashioned in the Imperial era. Even women of the working classes or slaves might have their babies nursed, and the Roman-era Greek gynecologist Soranus offers detailed advice on how to choose a wet nurse. Inscriptions such as religious dedications and epitaphs indicate that a nutrix would be proud of her profession. One even records a nutritor lactaneus, a male "milk nurse" who presumably used a bottle. Greek nurses were preferred, and the Romans believed that a baby who had a Greek nutrix could imbibe the language and grow up speaking Greek as fluently as Latin.

=== India ===
By the 1500s, a wealthy mother who did not use a wet nurse was worthy of remark in India. The child was not "put out" of the household; rather, the wet nurse was included within it. The imperial wet nurses of the Mughal court were given honours in the Turco-Mongol tradition.

=== United Kingdom ===
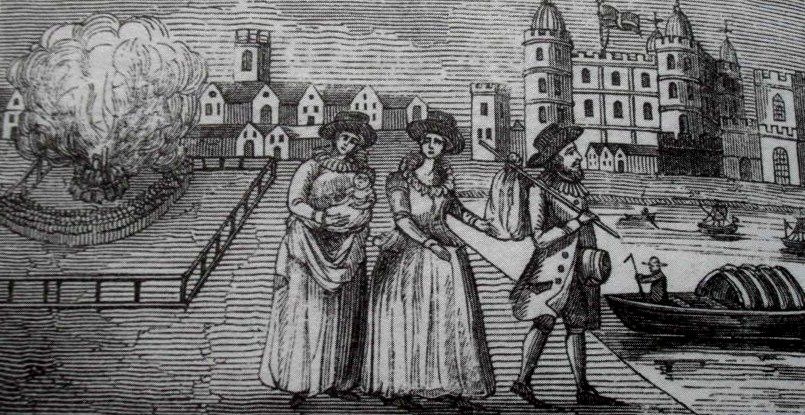
Catherine Willoughby, formerly Duchess of Suffolk, and her later husband Richard Bertie, are forced into exile, taking their baby and wet nurse.

Wet nursing used to be commonplace in the United Kingdom. Working-class women both provided and received wet-nursing services.

Taking care of babies was a well-paid, respectable, and popular job for many working-class women. In the 18th century, a woman would earn more money as a wet nurse than an average man could as a labourer. Up until the 19th century, most wet-nursed infants were sent far from their families to live with their new caregiver for up to the first three years of their life. As many as 80% of wet-nursed babies who lived like this died during infancy.

During the Victorian era, women took in babies for money and nursed them themselves or fed them with whatever was cheapest. This was known as baby-farming; poor care sometimes resulted in high infant death rates. The wet nurse at this period was most likely a single woman who previously had given birth to an illegitimate child. There were two types of wet nurses by this time: those on poor relief, who struggled to provide sufficiently for themselves or their charges, and the professionals, who were well paid and respected.

Upper-class women tended to hire wet nurses to work within their own homes, as part of a large household of servants.

Wet nurses also worked at foundling hospitals, establishments for abandoned children. Their own children would likely be sent away, normally brought up by the bottle rather than being breastfed. Valerie Fildes, author of Breasts, Bottle and Babies: A History of Infant Feeding, argues that "In effect, wealthy parents frequently 'bought' the life of their infant for the life of another."

Wet nursing decreased in popularity during the mid-19th century, as medical journalists wrote about its previously undocumented dangers. Fildes argued that "Britain has been lumped together with the rest of Europe in any discussion of the qualities, terms of employment and conditions of the wet nurse, and particularly the abuses of which she was supposedly guilty." C. H. F. Routh, a medical journalist writing in the late 1850s, listed the evils of wet nursing, such as the abandonment of the wet nurses' own children, higher infant mortality, and an increased physical and moral risk to a nursed child. While this argument was not founded in any sort of proof, the emotional arguments of medical researchers, coupled with the protests of other critics, slowly increased public knowledge; the practice declined, replaced by maternal breastfeeding and bottle-feeding.

=== France ===
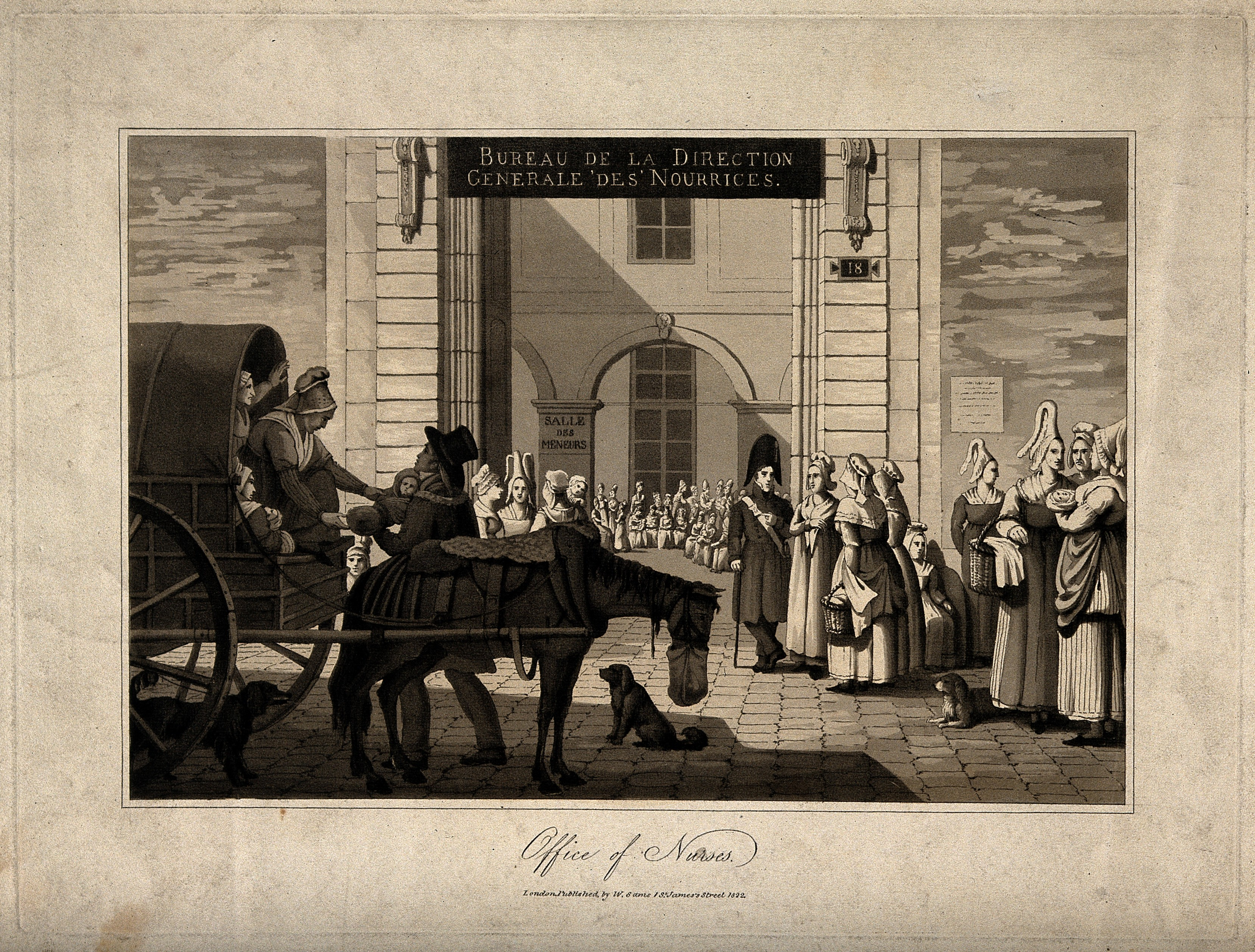
The bureau of wet nurses in Paris

Wet-nursing was reported in France in the time of Louis XIV, the mid-17th century. By the 18th century, approximately 90% of infants were wet-nursed, mostly sent away to live with their wet nurses. In Paris, only 1,000 of the 21,000 babies born in 1780 were nursed by their own mothers. The high demand for wet nurses coincided with the low wages and high rent prices of this era, which forced many women to have to work soon after childbirth. This meant that many mothers had to send their infants away to be breastfed and cared for by wet nurses even poorer than themselves. With the high demand for wet nurses, the price to hire one increased as the standard of care decreased. This led to many infant deaths. In response, rather than nursing their own children, upper-class women turned to hiring wet nurses to come live with them instead. In entering into their employer's home to care for their charges, these wet nurses had to leave their own infants to be nursed and cared for by women far worse off than themselves, and who likely lived at a relatively far distance away.

The Bureau of Wet Nurses was created in Paris in 1769 to serve two main purposes: it supplied parents with wet nurses, as well as helping lessen the neglect of babies by controlling monthly salary payments. In order to become a wet nurse, women had to meet a few qualifications, including physical fitness and good moral character; they were often judged on their age, their health, the number of children they had, as well as their breast shape, breast size, breast texture, nipple shape, and nipple size, since all these aspects were believed to affect the quality of a woman's milk. In 1874, the French government introduced a law named after Théophile Roussel, which "mandated that every infant placed with a paid guardian outside the parents' home be registered with the state so that the French government is able to monitor how many children are placed with wet nurses and how many wet-nursed children have died".

Wet nurses were hired to work in hospitals to nurse babies who were premature, ill, or abandoned. During the 18th and 19th centuries, congenital syphilis was a common cause of infant mortality. The Vaugirard hospital in Paris began to use mercury as a treatment; however, it could not be safely administered to infants. In 1780, it began the process of giving mercury to wet nurses, who could then transmit the treatment in their milk to infected infants.

The practice of wet-nursing was still widespread during World War I, according to the American Red Cross. Working-class women would leave their babies with wet nurses so they could get jobs in factories.

=== United States ===
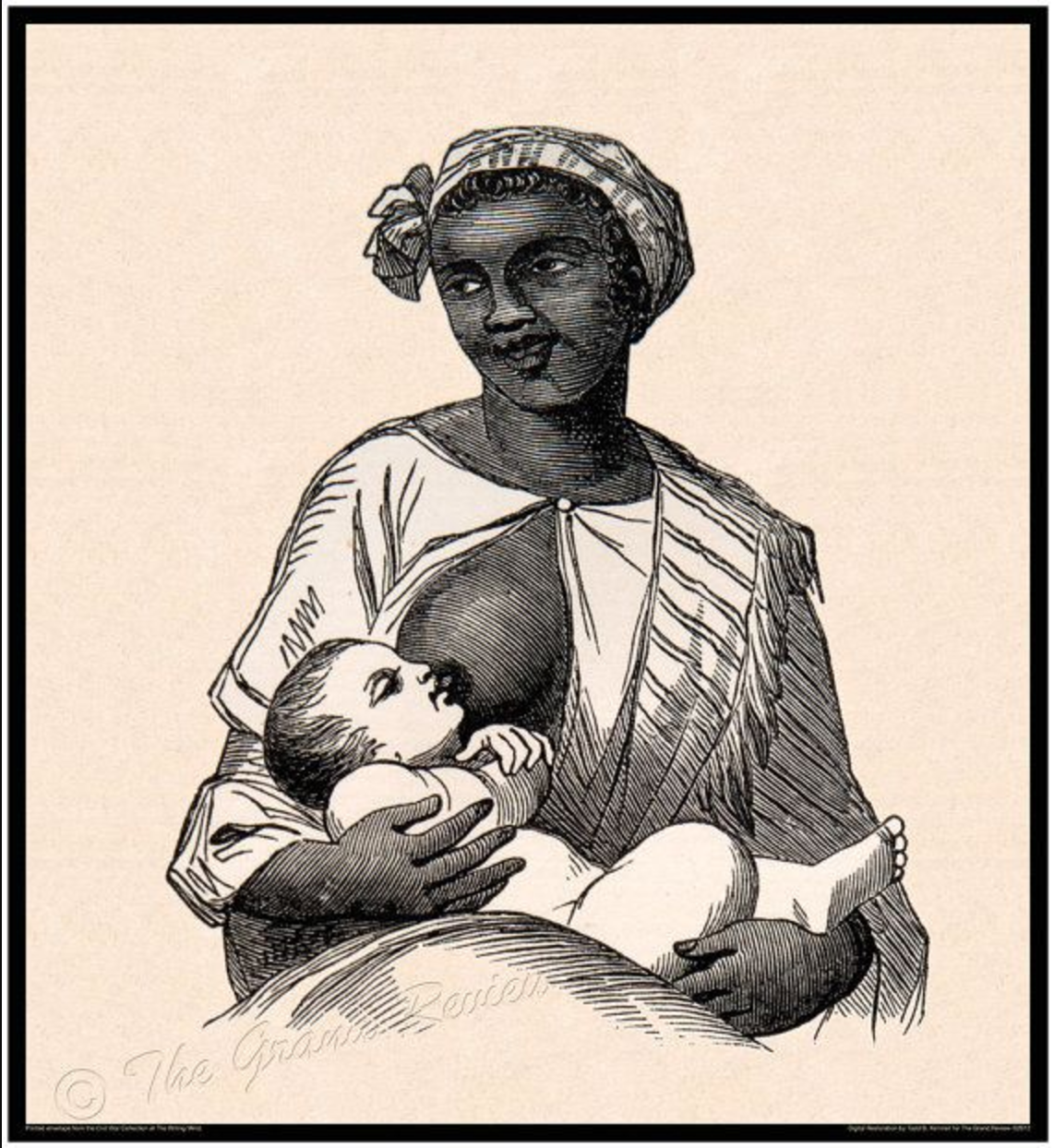
Enslaved black woman wet-nursing white infant

British colonists brought the practice of wet-nursing with them to North America. Since the arrangement of sending infants away to live with wet nurses was the cause of so many infant deaths, by the 19th century, Americans adopted the practice of having wet nurses live with the employers in order to nurse and care for their charges. This practice had the effect of increasing the death rate for wet nurses' own babies. Many employers would have only kept a wet nurse for a few months at a time since it was believed that the quality of a woman's breast milk would lessen over time.

Child-minding, different from wet-nursing, was also commonly an additional job on top of child rearing and nursery tending. Employed wet nurses were typically paid low wages and worked long hours. Workers in the 1900s demanded work contracts to provide stable wages. Wet nursing work was rarely consistent; wet nurses were stereotypically poor ladies from rural areas who offered their services for fees.

Since there were no official records kept pertaining to wet nurses or wet-nursed babies, historians lack the knowledge of precisely how many infants were wet-nursed and for how long, whether they lived at home or elsewhere, and how many lived or died. The best source of evidence is found in the "help wanted" ads of newspapers, through complaints about wet nurses in magazines, and through medical journals that acted as employment agencies.

==== Slavery ====
In the Southern United States before the Civil War, it was common practice for enslaved black women to be forced to be wet nurses to their owners' children. In some instances, the enslaved child and the white child would be raised together in their younger years. (Sometimes both babies would be fathered by the same man, the slave-owner; see Children of the plantation.) Visual representations of wet-nursing practices in enslaved communities are most prevalent in representations of the Mammy archetype caricature. Images such as the one in this section represent both a historically accurate practice of enslaved black women wet-nursing their owner's white children, as well as sometimes an exaggerated racist caricaturization of a stereotype of a "Mammy" character.

=== Egypt ===
From the mid-1800s to the mid-1900s, and especially after World War I, thousands of Slovene peasant women migrated via Trieste to the cosmopolitan port city of Alexandria. There, these aleksandrinke undertook various sorts of domestic work for elite Levantine households—"the highly mobile upper strata of Ottoman millets, Jewish, Maronites, Melkite active in international commerce". Enough served as wet nurses that this occupation became almost synonymous with Slovene domestic workers, which resulted in some stigma back home. Married women could leave Alexandria and return to their home village, where they would conceive and bear a child and leave the infant to the care of relatives or a hired wet nurse, while they returned to Egypt to seek new employment and a new charge to nurse.

This constitutes the origin of the archetype of the aleksandrinka as a wet nurse, which came to overpower any other representation of the aleksandrinstvo, despite the fact that empirical evidence demonstrates that only a tiny fraction of aleksandrinke at any time worked as wet nurses. The majority of aleksandrinke were working as nannies or chamber maids, they were not breastfeeding the children they were taking care of. The emphasis on lactaction, which marks the hypersexualization of the aleksandrinstvo, was part of the rhetorical stigma surrounding this phenomenon in Slovenia.

=== Brazil ===
During the 18th and 19th centuries, the use of enslaved wet nurses was considered fashionable among the upper class. Before the late 19th century, white women's breasts were believed to produce poor-quality milk. In his 1933 book Casa-Grande e Sanzala, Brazilian sociologist Gilberto Freyre blamed white women's inability to breastfeed on their incompatibility with the hot Brazilian climate and their young age of marriage and pregnancy. Black women, despite being considered inherently immoral and of poor-quality health, were believed to produce large amounts of high-quality milk due to their 'sanguine nature'. During the mid-19th century, free black women and lower-class white women also became wet nurses, a practice labeled as "mercenary breastfeeding" by the Brazilian elite.

The services of wet nurses were advertised in newspapers. Enslaved wet nurses were often advertised as being "skilled" domestic laborers with other abilities, such as cooking and laundry, to increase their appeal. Thanks to these skills, wet nurses could remain employed in a household after the baby was weaned as amas secas or "dry nurses". Furthermore, while childbirth is a necessary component of milk production, the child of the enslaved wet nurse was rarely a consideration. Some advertisements would even specify that the fate of the child was on the whims of the purchaser, stating that the mother could be sold with or without her child.

During the late 19th century, there was a shift in medical belief about the safety of the practice of enslaved wet nursing. Black wet nurses were blamed for the high infant mortality rate. One concern was the spread of syphilis, as enslavers would hide the syphilitic nature of their enslaved wet nurses to protect their financial interests. They also feared undesirable moral characteristics could be transferred from the wet nurse to the infant through her breast milk. Some medical professionals and hygienists raised concerns over the effect of forced separation of an enslaved mother and her biological child on the quality of her milk and her ability to care for charge. Her milk was not just believed to be less nutritious but actively poisonous and even deadly to the infant that she was breastfeeding. Abolitionists utilized these health concerns to advocate for the end of slavery.

Wet nurses were also hired by or rented out to rodas dos expotos in order to feed orphaned and abandoned infants.

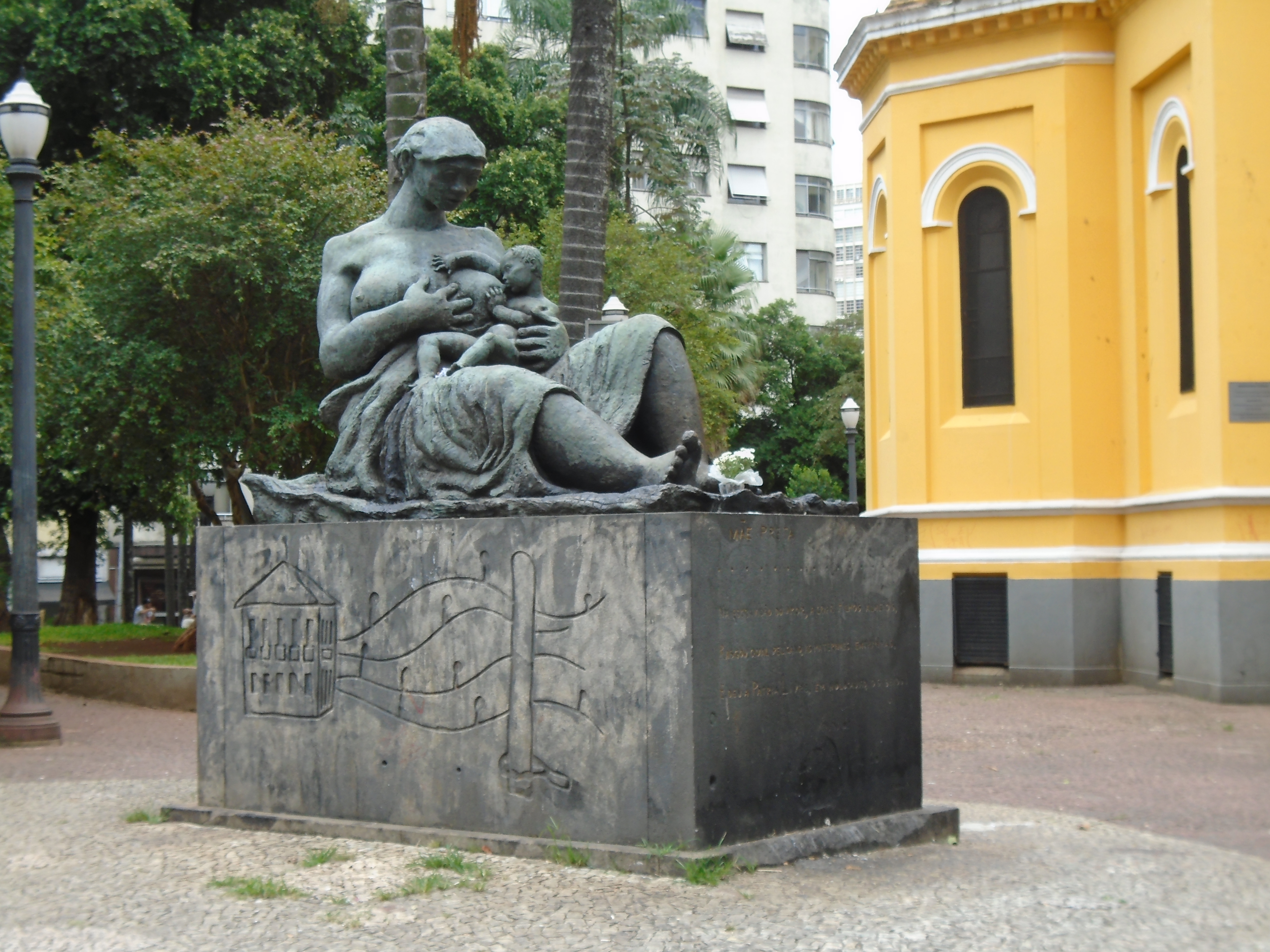
Julio Guerra, Monumento Mãe Preta (Monument to the Black Mother), 1955, São Paulo, Brazil.

Mãe Preta

After the abolition of slavery, there was a shift in the rhetoric used to discuss enslaved black wet nurses. While the medical literature of the 19th century referred to them as amas de liete (literally "mistresses of milk"), or nutriz ("nurse"), the sociological and common literature of the 20th century began referring to black enslaved wet nurses as mãe preta or "black mother".

The Monumento Mãe Preta (Monument of the Black Mother) by Julio Guerra, located in São Paulo, is the best-known piece of artwork depicting the black wet nurse in Brazil. Since it was put up in 1955, it has been a site of organizing for black activists in São Paulo and of religious expression for practitioners of Candomblé.

=== Haiti/Saint Domingue ===
During the 18th century, wet nursing in colonial Saint-Domingue typically occurred on plantations and in rural areas.

French medical professionals argued against the use of enslaved wet nurses, fearing that infants would contract a poor temperament and morals through the breast milk. There were also societal concerns over the presence of an enslaved black woman as a maternal figure within the home. Enslavers and colonial authors feared that this presence would weaken the racial stratification of society.

Enslaved women on plantations would also use their breast milk to feed the children of other enslaved women on the plantation to allow for more women to work in the field. This practice was often more similar to communal mothering than true wet nursing.

Contemporary Haitian views on wet nursing find the practice to be inferior to maternal breastfeeding or formula feeding, and it is therefore rarely practiced. Breast milk is viewed as dynamic, changing texture and nutritional value with the age of the baby, leading to the belief that wet nursing provides sub-optimal nutrition.

=== Cuba ===
In the 18th and 19th centuries, the use of enslaved wet nurse labor was common among the Cuban elite. Enslavers would advertise the services of their enslaved wet nurses in newspapers. It was common practice to mention how long it had been since the enslaved mother had given birth, but mentions of the actual child were rare.

While it was not a common practice, it was possible for enslaved women to use wet nursing as a means of earning a wage to pay for their freedom through coartación.

Wet nurses were also used for the foundlings that were left in tornos. While the elite would have the wet nurse in their home to care for their charge, foundlings were placed in the home of the wet nurse until they were five. The wet nurses were paid a yearly wage of 50 pesos per child by the church that ran the tornos.

== Relationships ==
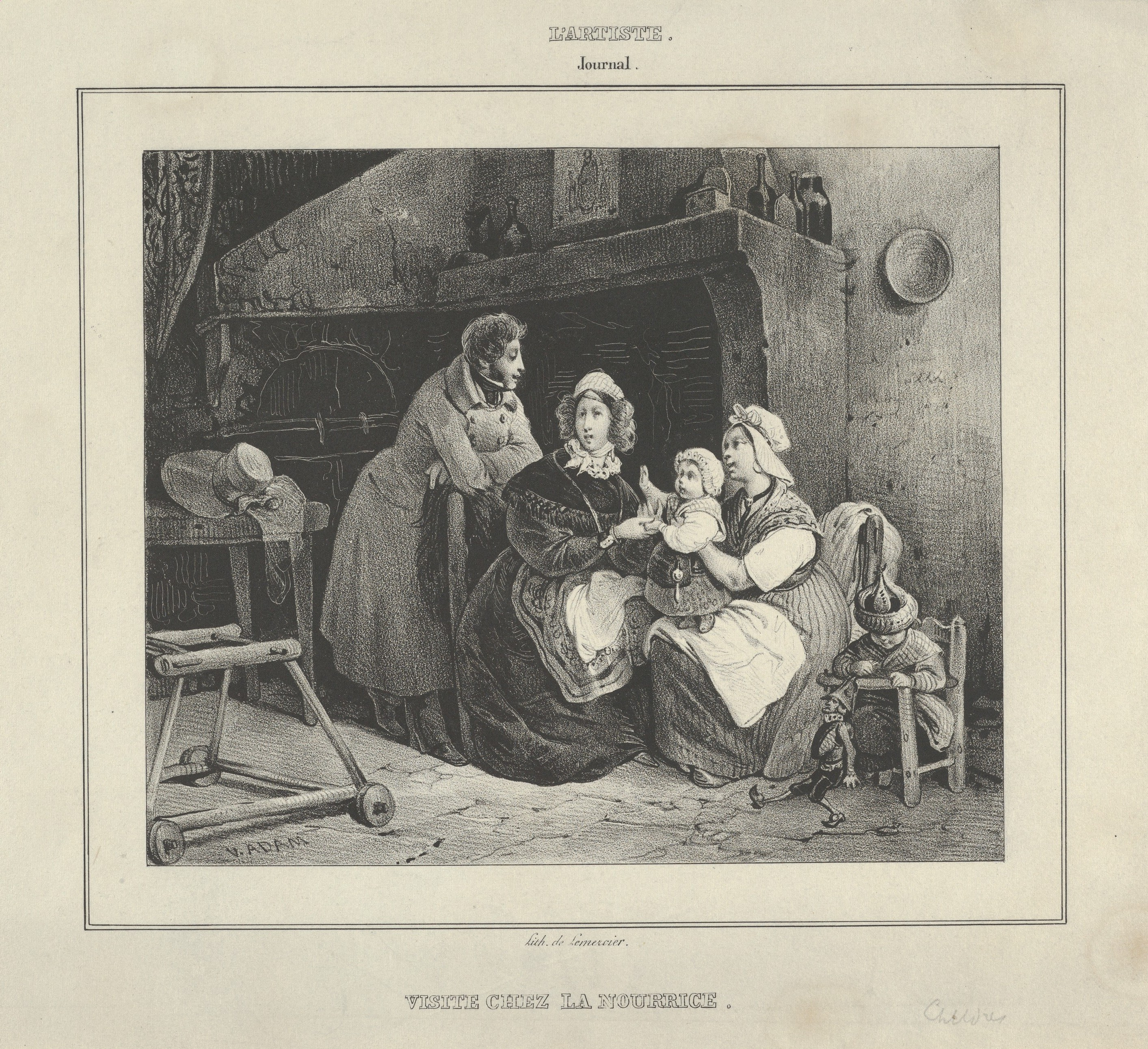
"Visite Chez la Nourrice" ("Visit to the Wet nurse") by Victor Adam

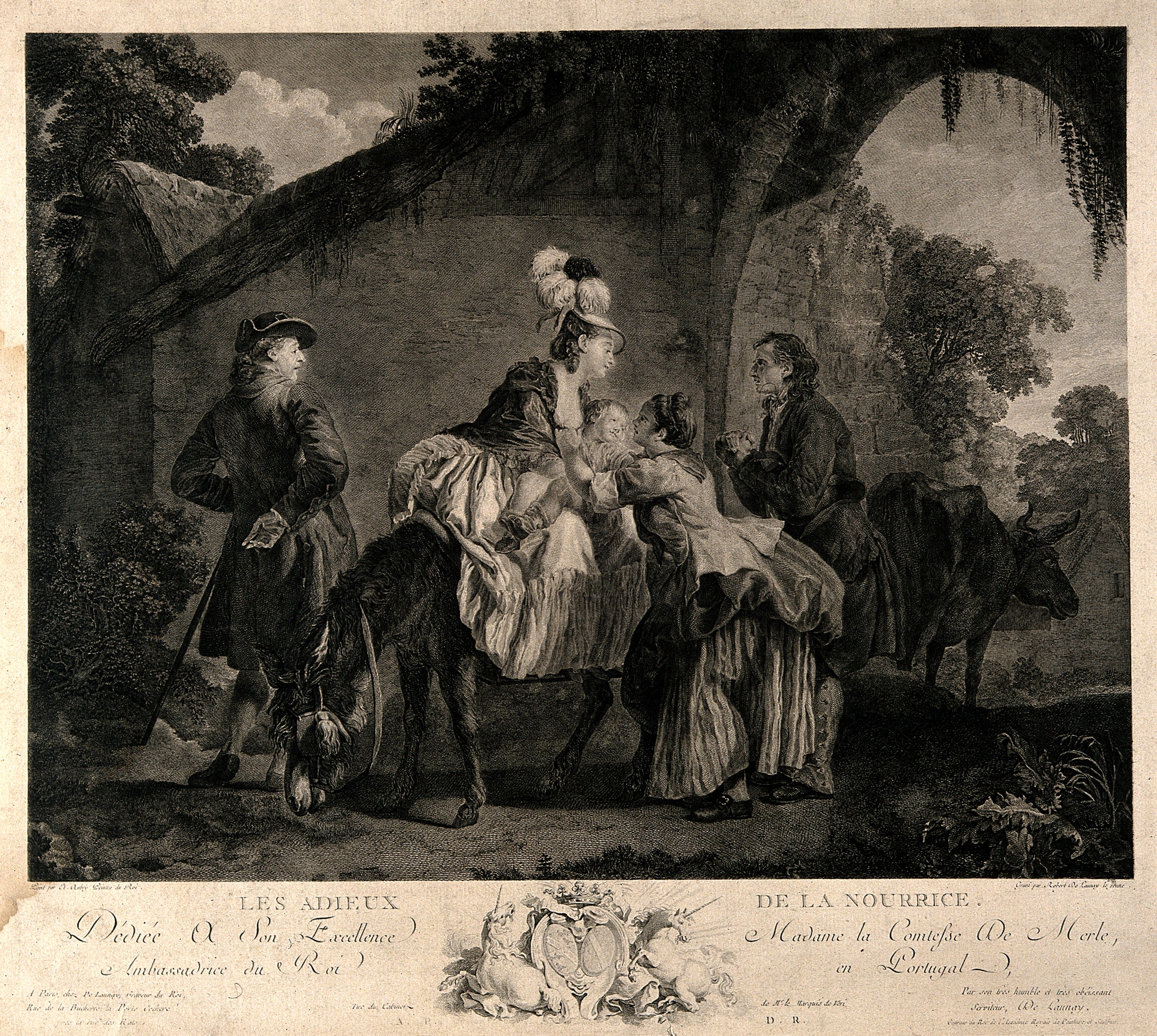
An infant who has been living with a wet nurse being taken away from its foster parents by its natural mother. By Étienne Aubry.

Sometimes, the infant was placed in the home of the wet nurse for several months, as was the case for Jane Austen and her siblings. The Papyrus Oxyrhynchus 91, a receipt from AD 187, attests to the ancient nature of this practice. Sometimes, the wet nurse came to live with the infant's family, filling a position between the monthly nurse (for the immediate post-partum period) and the nanny.

In some societies, the wet nurse was hired as any other employee. In others, however, she had a special relationship with the family, which could incur kinship rights. In Vietnamese family structure, for example, the wet nurse is known as Nhũ mẫu, mẫu meaning "mother". Islam has a highly codified system of milk kinship known as rada. George III of the United Kingdom, born two months premature, had a wet nurse whom he so valued all his life, that her daughter was appointed laundress to the Royal Household, "a sinecure place of great emolument".

Mothers who nurse each other's babies are engaging in a reciprocal act known as cross-nursing or co-nursing.

== Current attitudes in Western countries ==
In contemporary affluent Western societies such as the United States, the act of nursing a baby other than one's own often provokes cultural discomfort. When a mother is unable to nurse her own infant, an acceptable mediated substitute is expressed milk (or especially colostrum), which is donated to milk banks, analogous to blood banks, and processed there by being screened, pasteurized, and usually frozen. Infant formula is also widely available, which its makers claim can be a reliable source of infant nutrition when prepared properly. Dr. Rhonda Shaw notes that Western objections to wet nurses are cultural:

The exchange of body fluids between different women and children, and the exposure of intimate bodily parts make some people uncomfortable. The hidden subtext of these debates has to do with perceptions of moral decency. Societies with breast fetishes tend to conflate the sexual and erotic breast with the functional and lactating breast.

For some Americans, the subject of wet-nursing is becoming increasingly open for discussion. During a goodwill tour to Sierra Leone with UNICEF in 2008, American Mexican actress Salma Hayek decided to breastfeed a local infant in front of the accompanying film crew. The sick one-week-old baby had been born the same day but a year later than Hayek's daughter, who had not yet been weaned.

== Current situation elsewhere ==
Wet nurses are still common in many developing countries, although the practice poses a risk of infections, such as HIV. In China, Indonesia, and the Philippines, a wet nurse may be employed in addition to a nanny as a mark of aristocracy, wealth, and high status. Following the 2008 Chinese milk scandal, in which contaminated infant formula poisoned thousands of babies, the salaries of wet nurses there increased dramatically.

== Notable wet nurses ==
In Ancient Egypt, Maia was the wet nurse of King Tutankhamun. Sitre In, the nurse of Hatshepsut, was not a member of the royal family but received the honour of a burial in the royal necropolis in the Valley of the Kings, in tomb KV60. Her coffin has the inscription wr šdt nfrw nswt In, meaning Great Royal Wet Nurse In.

In Asia, Lady Kasuga was the wet nurse of the third Tokugawa shōgun, Iemitsu. Lu Lingxuan was a lady in waiting who served as wet nurse to the emperor Gao Wei. She became exceedingly powerful during his reign and was often criticized by historians for her corruption and treachery. Chinese emperors honoured the Nurse empress dowager. Wet nurses were also common during the Mughal period, with almost every Mughal prince having one. Some prominent ones are Maham Anga for Akbar and Dai Anga for Shah Jahan. Shin Myo Myat was the mother of King Bayinnaung of the Toungoo dynasty of Burma (Myanmar), and the wet nurse of King Tabinshwehti. The last Emperor of China, Puyi, described Wang Lianshou as being the only person who was able to control him: "from my infancy until the time I grew up, only my wet nurse, because of her simple language, was able to make me grasp the idea that I was like other people."

In the Ottoman Empire, after the slave Zafire Hatun gave birth to her son Osman, she was selected to be the wet nurse of future sultan Mehmed IV. Mehmed's father, Sultan Ibrahim, is said to have taken a liking to Zafire, and he reportedly began to favour Osman over Mehmed, eventually resulting in Zafire and Osman leaving the harem.

In Europe, Hodierna of St Albans was the mother of Alexander Neckam and wet nurse of Richard I of England, and Mrs. Pack was a wet nurse to William, Duke of Gloucester (1689–1700). Geneviève Poitrine was a wet nurse of the Dauphin of France, Louis Joseph, son of King Louis XVI and Queen Marie Antoinette. Poitrine was accused of transmitting tuberculosis to the Dauphin and triggering his infant death when aged seven, although since very few pre-adolescent children die from TB, this accusation may have been the result of a misdiagnosis.

Some non-royal wet nurses have also been written about. Halimah bint Abi Dhuayb was the foster mother and wet nurse of the Islamic prophet Muhammad. Petronella Muns was, with her employer, the first Western woman to visit Japan. Naomi Baumslag, author of Milk, Money and Madness, described the legendary capacity of Judith Waterford: "In 1831, on her 81st birthday, she could still produce breast milk. In her prime she unfailingly produced two quarts (four pints or 1.9 litres) of breast milk a day."

== See also ==
- Roman Charity, works of art based on the story of a daughter feeding her dying father.
- Selling Mother's Milk: The Wet-Nursing Business in France, 1715–1914, a history of wet nurses in France.
