= Blooding (hunting) =

Hunting ritual with ancient roots

Blooding is an initiation ritual in hunting. An article on blooding in the British royal family says "Spreading blood on a person’s face is an ancient ritual performed to celebrate a hunter’s first successful kill." The ritual of blooding continues today, among hunters—especially upon children.

In his memoir Spare, Prince Harry described how he was forcibly blooded at age 15 by his guide Sandy Masson who cut open the stag Harry had shot, pushed Harry's head inside the carcass, and held it there while Harry struggled to free himself. When Sandy released him, Harry tried to wipe the blood from his face, but Sandy insisted that he "Let it dry.”

It was Sandy Masson, too, who had blooded The Prince of Wales years earlier. Painter André Durand has created "First Blood", a painting imaginatively depicting a 14-year-old Prince William wearing ermine robes and his face blooded, with a dead stag.

Tom Quinn, author of Gilded Youth, a book examining the ways in which members of the royal family raise their children, writes that few expect The Princess of Wales (the wife of Prince William) will allow her children, Prince George and Prince Louis to be initiated with the blooding ritual which, in the royal family's tradition, sees young princes smeared with the blood of their first kills.

== Controversy ==
In 1914, humanitarian and animal rights campaigner Henry Stephens Salt wrote an essay "The Blooding of Children" declaring that there are no more “loathsome” traditions connected with "sport" than blooding. That essay was published in the book Killing for Sport: Essays by Various Writers (1914), edited by Salt.

== In the news ==
The blooding of a 13-year-old American boy was in the news in September 2024.

== Risks ==
Scott Durham, a scientist studying deer, has said: "... it’s theoretically possible that one of a few neurological viral diseases could be contracted if an infected deer’s blood came in contact" with a human's skin.

== See also ==
- Blood ritual
- Hubert of Liège
- Fox hunting
- Kublai Khan was blooded in 1226 at age 11
- Hulegu Khan was blooded in 1226 at age 9
- Ghazan Khan was blooded in 1280 at age 8
- Prince William, Duke of Gloucester was blooded in 1696 at age 7
- Henry Somerset, 10th Duke of Beaufort was blooded about 1910 at age 10
