= Christen Jensen Lodberg =

Christen Jensen Lodberg (31 October 1625 - 12 June 1693) was a Danish bishop.

Born in Todbøl, Lodbjerg Parish, his father, Jens Christensen, was a farmer. In his eleventh year, he went to the small grammar school in Thisted, and then to Viborg, from Viborg perhaps to Odense and finally to Roskilde school, from which he graduated in 1647. During his studies, he returned to the farm to help out.

After completing his theological studies and accumulating some money, he traveled abroad in 1652, partly helped by a scholarship. Beset by lack of funds, he may have enlisted as a soldier on his travels, first in Naples, where he is said to have become acquainted with a Spanish general, under whom he served one and a half years in the Spanish guard.

After his return in 1657, he took a master's degree, gave philosophical lectures and released some physico-astronomical theses, one of which, Philosophical-theological study on the first 2 verses of Genesis, attracted attention.

After again having been abroad, as the steward of a young nobleman, he became in 1663 professor at Sorø Academy, which had been in decline. In 1665 he was called to court as tutor to the King of Denmark's younger son, Prince George of Denmark. He was appointed dean of Roskilde in 1666, while continuing to be the prince's confessor. In 1681, he became bishop of Ribe and the following year a doctor of theology.

In 1671, he married Johanne Eilertz (1649-1714), daughter of Alderman Jacob Eilertz of Copenhagen.

He died in Ribe, and was buried in Roskilde Cathedral.

His son Jacob Lodberg was Bishop of Odense.
