= Selling Mother's Milk =

1982 book by George D. Sussman

Selling Mothers' Milk: The Wet-Nursing Business in France, 1715–1914
- Author: George D. Sussman
- Publisher: University of Illinois Press
- Publication date: 1 December 1982
- Pages: 232
- ISBN: 978-0252009198

Selling Mother's Milk: The Wet-Nursing Business in France, 1715–1914 is a 1982 book by George D. Sussman that is about the history of wet nurses in France. The author attempted to find a correlation between the population decline in France and the practice of wet nursing.

== Content ==
The book's coverage starts in 1715 when wet nurses were common in France, and continues to the Roussel Law in 1874 and follows the practice of paid wet nursing until the practice declined at the outset of World War I. The 1874 Roussel Law allowed the government to monitor wet nursing by requiring every infant that was placed with a guardian to be registered with the state.

The babies were sent to a wet nurse for a year or two, although there was an "at least one-in-three chance" of the children never returning to their parents due to poor care. Parents who sent their children included artisans and shopkeepers, but they were not the poorest class of people and at times have spent the money meant for the wet nurses elsewhere. Sussman states that the practice of rural wet nursing declined due to the changing family attitude towards young children, safe breastfeeding methods becoming possible, and that outside work for married women in France became less important compared to raising their children.

Until the 1900s, French wives having careers was important for the family to survive and these families often saved enough money to send their babies to rural wet nurses. The demand for wet nurses was higher than the number that was available. The nurses were not allowed to become pregnant again due to those pregnancies "spoiling" their milk. Sussman thought that the mortality rate of the practice and how slow the population grew in France during the 1800s were related.

== Publication ==
Prior works on the subject of wet nursing were about if mothers were concerned with their newborns based on whether they would breastfeed them or not. Sussman studied the parents and motives of everyone involved while showing the inner-workings of the wet nurse business. The author used the medical literature available about wet nursing to write about the babies' treatment and mortality from the 1700s to the 1800s. The book was published by the University of Illinois Press in 1982.

== Reception ==
Edward Shorter of The American Historical Review concluded his review with, "But this modest, well-researched study clears away much of the underbrush for other scholars who will want to know about the emotional significance of this singular custom." Paul G. Spagnoli, writing for The Journal of Interdisciplinary History said, "His book deserves the attention of an audience eager for a respite from volumes without being any more useful."
