= Prince George of Denmark =

Consort of Queen Anne from 1702 to 1708

- Duke of Cumberland
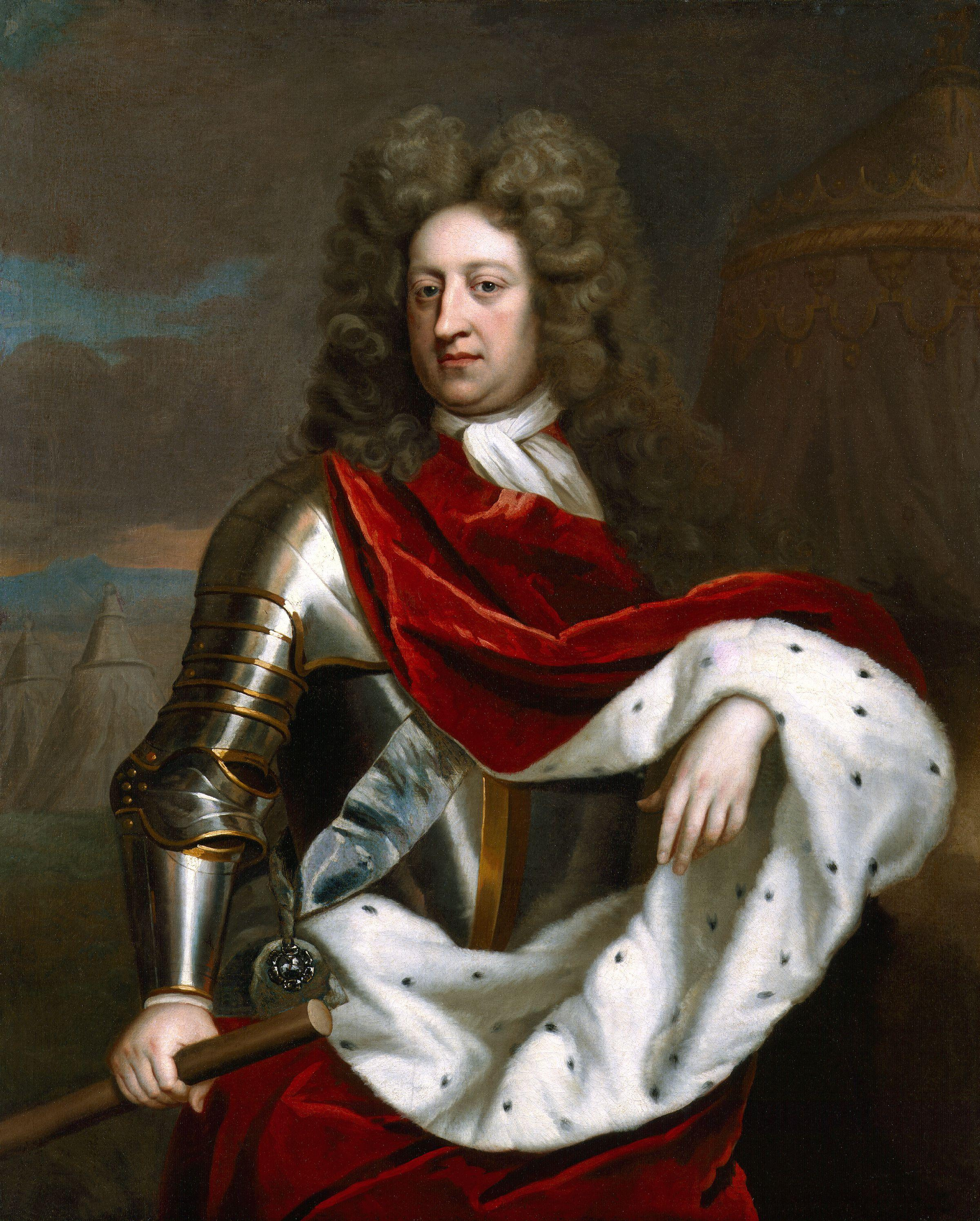
- Portrait c. 1705

Consort of the British monarch
- Tenure: 8 March 1702 – 28 October 1708
- Born: 2 April 1653 (Note: The date is occasionally given as 29 February, 21 April, or 11 November 1653, but 2 April is the date on his coffin plate.); Copenhagen Castle, Copenhagen, Denmark
- Died: 28 October 1708 (aged 55); Kensington Palace, London, England
- Burial: 13 November 1708; Westminster Abbey
- Spouse: Anne, Queen of Great Britain (m. 1683)
- Issue more...: Prince William, Duke of Gloucester
- House: Oldenburg
- Father: Frederick III of Denmark
- Mother: Sophie Amalie of Brunswick-Lüneburg
- Religion: Lutheran

Prince George of Denmark and Norway, Duke of Cumberland (Danish: Jørgen; 2 April 1653 – 28 October 1708), was the husband of Anne, Queen of Great Britain. He was the consort of the British monarch from Anne's accession on 8 March 1702 until his death in 1708.

The marriage of George and Anne was arranged in the early 1680s with a view to developing an Anglo-Danish alliance to contain Dutch maritime power. As a result, George was disliked by his Dutch brother-in-law, William of Orange, who was married to Anne's elder sister, Mary. Anne and Mary's father, the British ruler James II, was deposed in the Glorious Revolution in 1688, and William and Mary succeeded him as joint monarchs with Anne as heir presumptive. The new monarchs granted George the title of Duke of Cumberland.

William excluded George from active military service, and neither George nor Anne wielded any great influence until after the deaths of Mary and then William, at which point Anne became queen. During his wife's reign, George occasionally used his influence in support of his wife, even when privately disagreeing with her views. He had an easy-going manner and little interest in politics; his appointment as Lord High Admiral of England in 1702 was largely honorary.

Anne's seventeen pregnancies by George resulted in twelve miscarriages or stillbirths, four infant deaths, and a chronically ill son, Prince William, Duke of Gloucester, who died at the age of eleven. Despite the deaths of their children, George and Anne's marriage was a strong one. George died aged 55 from a recurring and chronic lung disease, much to the devastation of his wife, and he was buried in Westminster Abbey.

== Early life ==
George was born on 2 April 1653 at Copenhagen Castle, the younger son of Frederick III, King of Denmark and of Norway, and Sophie Amalie of Brunswick-Lüneburg. His mother was the sister of Ernest Augustus, Duke of Brunswick-Lüneburg, later Elector of Hanover. From 1661, his governor was Otto Grote, later Hanoverian minister to Denmark. Grote was "more courtier and statesman than educator" and when he left for the Hanoverian court in 1665, he was replaced by the more effective Christen Lodberg. George received military training, and undertook a Grand Tour of Europe, spending eight months in 1668–1669 in France and mid-1669 in England. His father died in 1670, while George was in Italy, and George's elder brother, Christian V, inherited the Danish throne. George returned home through Germany. He travelled through Germany again in 1672–1673, to visit two of his sisters, Anna Sophia and Wilhelmine Ernestine, who were married to the electoral princes of Saxony and the Palatinate.

In 1674, George was a candidate for the Polish elective throne, for which he was backed by King Louis XIV of France. George's staunch Lutheranism was a barrier to election in Roman Catholic Poland, and John Sobieski was chosen instead. In 1677, George served with distinction with his elder brother Christian in the Scanian War against Sweden.

As a Protestant, George was considered a suitable partner for the niece of King Charles II of England, Lady Anne. They were distantly related (second cousins once removed; they were both descended from King Frederick II of Denmark), and had never met. George was hosted by Charles II in London in 1669, but Anne was in France at the time. Both Denmark and Britain were Protestant, and Louis XIV was keen on an Anglo-Danish alliance to contain the power of the Dutch Republic. Anne's uncle Laurence Hyde, 1st Earl of Rochester, and the English Secretary of State for the Northern Department, Robert Spencer, 2nd Earl of Sunderland, negotiated a marriage treaty with the Danes in secret, to prevent the plans leaking to the Dutch. Anne's father, James, Duke of York, welcomed the marriage because it diminished the influence of his other son-in-law, William III of Orange, who was naturally unhappy with the match.

== Marriage ==
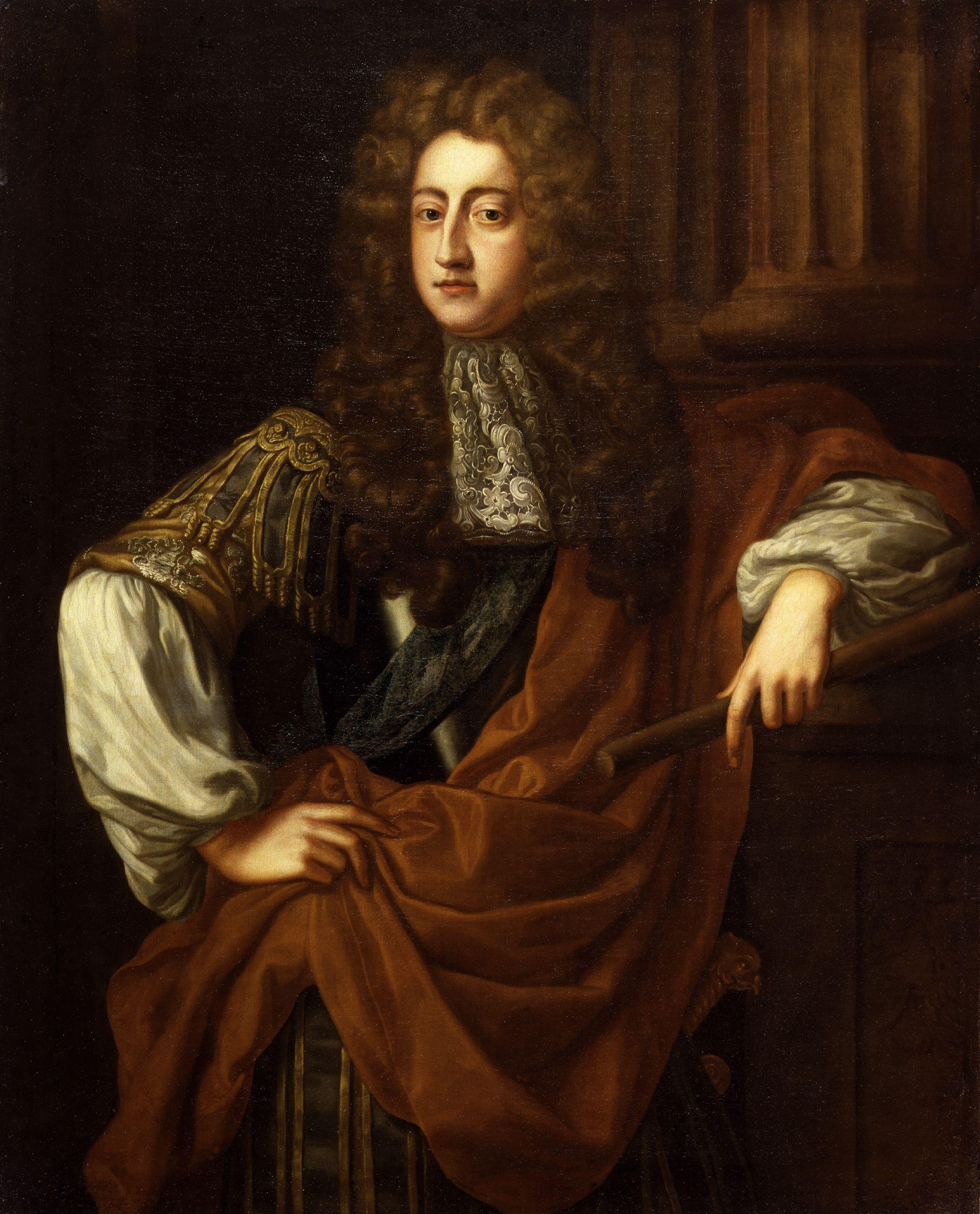
Portrait by John Riley, c. 1687

George and Anne were married on 28 July 1683 in the Chapel Royal at St James's Palace, London, by Henry Compton, the Bishop of London. The guests included King Charles II, Queen Catherine, and the Duke and Duchess of York. Anne was voted a parliamentary allowance of £20,000 a year, while George received £10,000 a year from his Danish estates, although payments from Denmark were often late or incomplete. King Charles gave them a set of buildings in the Palace of Whitehall known as the Cockpit (near the site of what is now Downing Street in Westminster) as their London residence.

George was not ambitious, and hoped to live a quiet life of domesticity with his wife. He wrote to a friend:

We talk here of going to tea, of going to Winchester, and everything else except sitting still all summer, which was the height of my ambition. God send me a quiet life somewhere, for I shall not be long able to bear this perpetual motion.

Within months of the marriage, Anne was pregnant but the baby, a girl, was stillborn in May. Anne recovered at the spa town of Tunbridge Wells, and over the next two years, she gave birth to two daughters in quick succession, Mary and Anne Sophia. In early 1687, within a matter of days, George and his two young daughters caught smallpox, and Anne suffered another miscarriage. George recovered, but both his daughters died. Lady Rachel Russell wrote that George and Anne had "taken [the deaths] very heavily. The first relief of that sorrow proceeded from the threatening of a greater, the Prince being so ill of a fever. I never heard any relation more moving than that of seeing them together. Sometimes they wept, sometimes they mourned in words; then sat silent, hand in hand; he sick in bed, and she the carefullest nurse to him that can be imagined." He returned to Denmark for a two-month visit in mid-1687, while Anne remained in England. Later that year, after his return, Anne gave birth to another dead child, this time a son.

In February 1685, King Charles II died without legitimate issue, and George's father-in-law, the Roman Catholic Duke of York, became king as James II in England and Ireland and James VII in Scotland. George was appointed to the Privy Council and invited to attend Cabinet meetings, although he had no power to alter or affect decisions. William of Orange refused to attend James's coronation largely because George would take precedence over him. Although they were both sons-in-law of King James, George was also the son and brother of a king and so outranked William, who was an elected stadtholder of a republic.

Anne's older sister Mary had moved to the Netherlands after her marriage to William of Orange. Protestant opposition to James was therefore increasingly focused around Anne and George instead of Mary, who was heir presumptive. The social and political grouping centred on George and Anne was known as the "Cockpit Circle" after their London residence. On 5 November 1688, William invaded England in an action, known as the "Glorious Revolution", which ultimately deposed King James. George was forewarned by the Danish envoy in London, Frederick Gersdorff, that William was assembling an invasion fleet. George informed Gersdorff that James's army was disaffected, and as a result he would refuse any command under James, but only serve as an uncommissioned volunteer. Gersdorff's alternative plan to evacuate George and Anne to Denmark was rejected by George. George accompanied the King's troops to Salisbury in mid-November, but other nobles and their soldiers soon deserted James for William. At each defection, George apparently exclaimed, "Est-il possible?" (Is it possible?). He abandoned James on 24 November, and sided with William. "So 'Est-il possible' is gone too", James supposedly remarked. In his memoirs, James dismissed George's defection as trivial, saying the loss of one good trooper was of more consequence, but Gersdorff claimed the defection greatly perturbed the King. The defection of George and other nobles was instrumental in whittling away the King's support. In December, James fled to France, and early the following year William and Mary were declared joint monarchs, with Anne as heir presumptive.

== Duke of Cumberland ==
Prince George of Denmark (Exhibition of Bill) Act 1688
- Act of Parliament
- Parliament of England
- Long title: An Act for exhibiting a Bill in this present Parliament, for naturalizing the most Noble Prince George of Denmarke.
- Citation: 1 Will. & Mar. c. 2 Pr.
- Territorial extent: England and Wales

Dates
- Royal assent: 3 April 1689
- Commencement: 13 February 1689 (Note: Start of session.)
Other legislation
Relates to	Prince George of Denmark (Naturalization and Precedence) Act 1688

Status: Current legislation

Prince George of Denmark (Naturalization and Precedence) Act 1688
- Act of Parliament
- Parliament of England
- Long title: An Act for the Naturalization of the most Noble Prince George of Denmark, and settling his Precedence.
- Citation: 1 Will. & Mar. c. 3 Pr.
- Territorial extent: England and Wales

Dates
- Royal assent: 9 April 1689
- Commencement: 13 February 1689
Other legislation
Relates to	Prince George of Denmark (Exhibition of Bill) Act 1688

Status: Current legislation

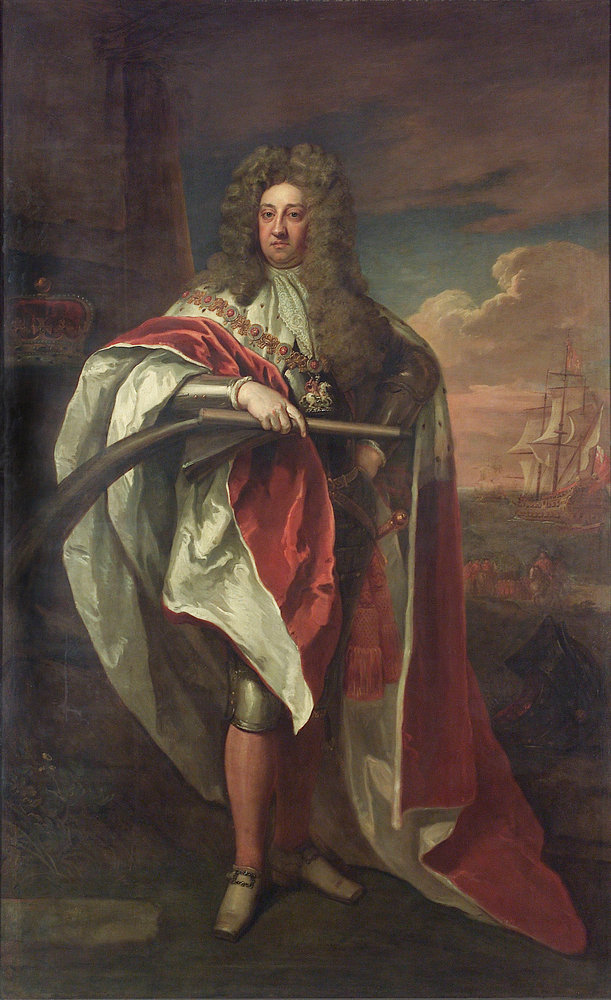
Prince George wearing a ducal robe with the collar of the Garter, by Godfrey Kneller, c. 1704. Behind him, a ship offshore is flying the Admiralty flag.

In early April 1689, William assented to a bill naturalizing George as an English subject, the Prince George of Denmark (Naturalization and Precedence) Act 1688 (1 Will. & Mar. c. 3) and George was created Duke of Cumberland, Earl of Kendal and Baron of Okingham (Wokingham) by the new monarchs. He took his seat in the House of Lords on 20 April 1689, being introduced by the Dukes of Somerset and Ormonde.

The mistrust between George and William was set aside during the revolution of 1688–89 but dogged relations during the latter's reign. George held mortgages on Femern, Tremsbüttel and Steinhorst, Schleswig-Holstein, which he surrendered to the Duke of Holstein as part of the peace of Altona of 1689 negotiated by William between Denmark and Sweden. William agreed to pay George interest and the capital in compensation, but George remained unpaid. During the military campaign against James's supporters in Ireland, George accompanied the Williamite troops at his own expense, but was excluded from command, and was even refused permission to travel in his brother-in-law's coach. Snubbed from the army by William, George sought to join the navy, without rank, but was again thwarted by his brother-in-law. When William's Dutch guards failed to salute George, Anne assumed they were acting under orders. George and Anne retired from court. Some degree of reconciliation was achieved following Queen Mary's sudden and unexpected death from smallpox in 1694, which made Anne heiress apparent. In November 1699, William finally recommended that Parliament pay the mortgage debt to George and, in early 1700, the debt was honoured.

By 1700, Anne had been pregnant at least seventeen times; twelve times, she miscarried or gave birth to stillborn children, and two of their five children born alive died within a day. The only one of the couple's children to survive infancy—Prince William, Duke of Gloucester—died in July 1700 at the age of 11. With Gloucester's death, Anne was the only person in the line of succession to the throne, as established by the "Glorious Revolution". To extend the line and secure the Protestant succession, Parliament passed the Act of Settlement 1701, which designated William and Anne's nearest Protestant cousins, the House of Hanover, as the next in line after Anne.

=== Consort of the Queen ===
George did not play a senior role in government until his wife Anne succeeded as queen on William's death in 1702. George was the chief mourner at William's funeral. Anne appointed him generalissimo of all English military forces on 17 April, and Lord High Admiral, the official but nominal head of the Royal Navy, on 20 May. Actual power at the Admiralty was held by George Churchill, whose elder brother was John Churchill, 1st Duke of Marlborough, a great friend of Anne's and the captain-general of English land forces. Prince George had known the Churchills for years: another brother Charles Churchill, had been one of his gentlemen of the bedchamber in Denmark, and Marlborough had accompanied George on his journey from Denmark to England for his marriage to Anne in 1683. George's secretary in the 1680s was Colonel Edward Griffith, brother-in-law of the Duchess of Marlborough, who was Anne's close confidante and friend. George followed William III as Captain-General of the Honourable Artillery Company, and was made Lord Warden of the Cinque Ports. Anne failed, however, in her attempts to persuade the States General of the Netherlands to elect her husband captain-general of all Dutch forces, to maintain the unified command of the Maritime Powers that William had held.

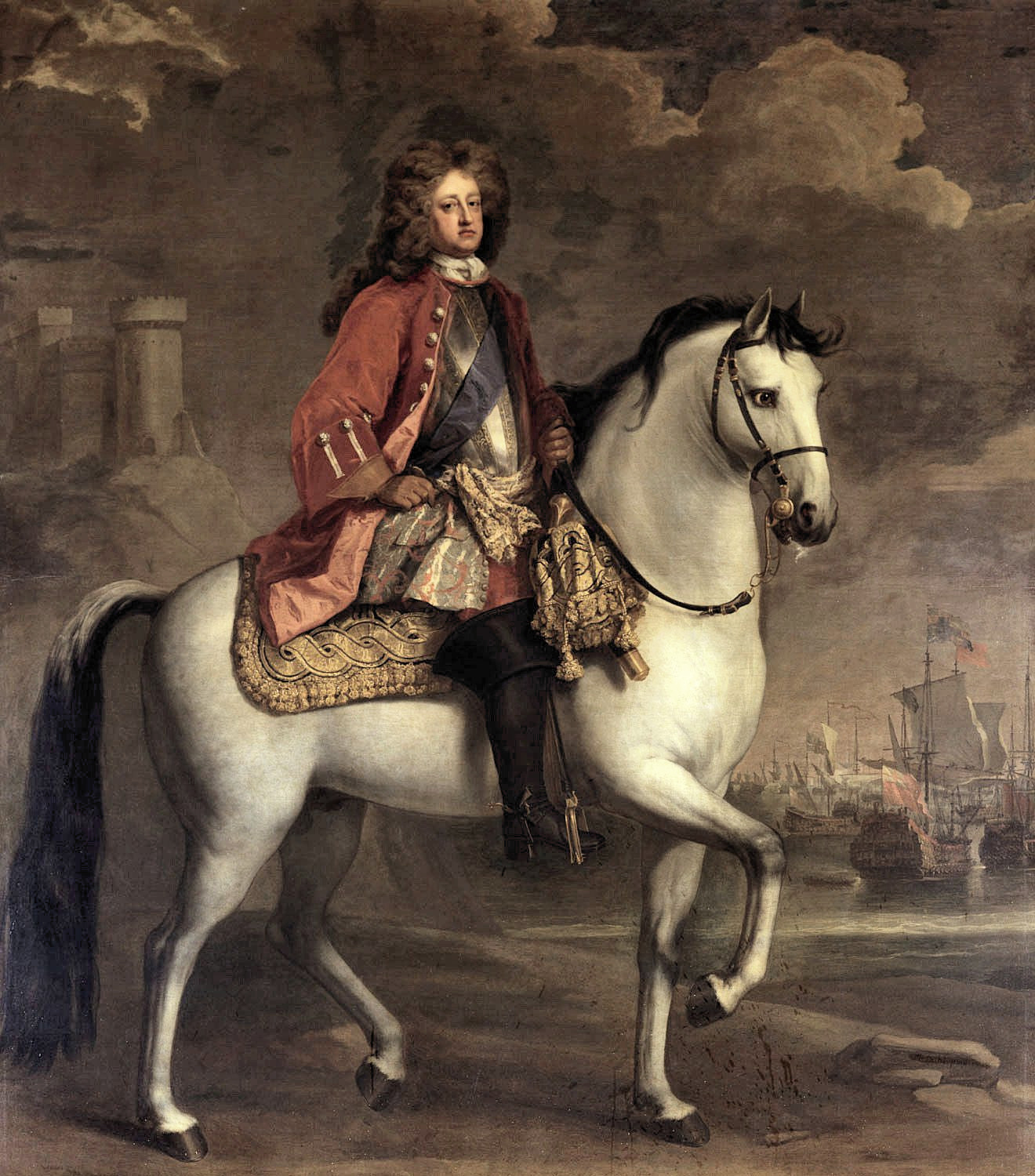
George on horseback, painted by Michael Dahl, 1704

Anne obtained a parliamentary allowance of £100,000 a year for George in the event of her death. The bill sped through the House of Commons easily but it was only narrowly passed by the House of Lords. Marlborough supported the bill, but one of the lords against was Marlborough's son-in-law, Charles Spencer, 3rd Earl of Sunderland. Marlborough dissuaded her from asking Parliament to make "her dearly loved husband King Consort".

Generally, during her reign, Anne and George spent the winter at Kensington and St James's Palaces, and the summer at Windsor Castle or Hampton Court Palace, where the air was fresher. George had recurrent asthma, and the cleaner air in the country was better for his breathing. They visited the spa town of Bath, Somerset, in mid-1702, on the advice of George's doctors, and again in mid-1703. They occasionally visited Newmarket, Suffolk, to view the horse racing. On one visit, Anne bought George a horse, Leeds, for the vast sum of a thousand guineas.

At the end of 1702, the Occasional Conformity Bill was introduced to Parliament. The bill aimed to disqualify Protestant Dissenters from public office by closing a loophole in the Test Acts, legislation that restricted public office to Anglican conformists. The existing law permitted nonconformists to take office if they took Anglican communion once a year. Anne was in favour of the measure, and forced George to vote for the bill in the House of Lords, even though, being a practising Lutheran, he was an occasional conformist himself. As he cast his vote, he reportedly told an opponent of the bill, "My heart is vid you" [sic]. The bill did not gather sufficient parliamentary support and was eventually dropped. The following year, the bill was revived, but Anne withheld support, fearing its reintroduction was a deliberate pretence to cause a quarrel between the two main political groups: the Tories (who supported the bill) and the Whigs (who opposed it). Once again it failed. George never became a member of the Church of England, which was headed by his wife throughout her reign. He remained Lutheran even after her accession, and had his own personal chapel.

In the first years of Anne's reign, the Whigs gained more power and influence at the expense of the Tories. In his capacity as Lord Warden of the Cinque Ports, George held influence in parliamentary boroughs on the south coast of England, which he used to support Whig candidates in the general election of 1705. In that year's election for Speaker of the House of Commons, George and Anne supported a Whig candidate, John Smith. George instructed his secretary, George Clarke, who was a Member of Parliament, to vote for Smith, but Clarke refused, instead supporting the Tory candidate William Bromley. Clarke was sacked, and Smith was elected.

== Illness and death ==
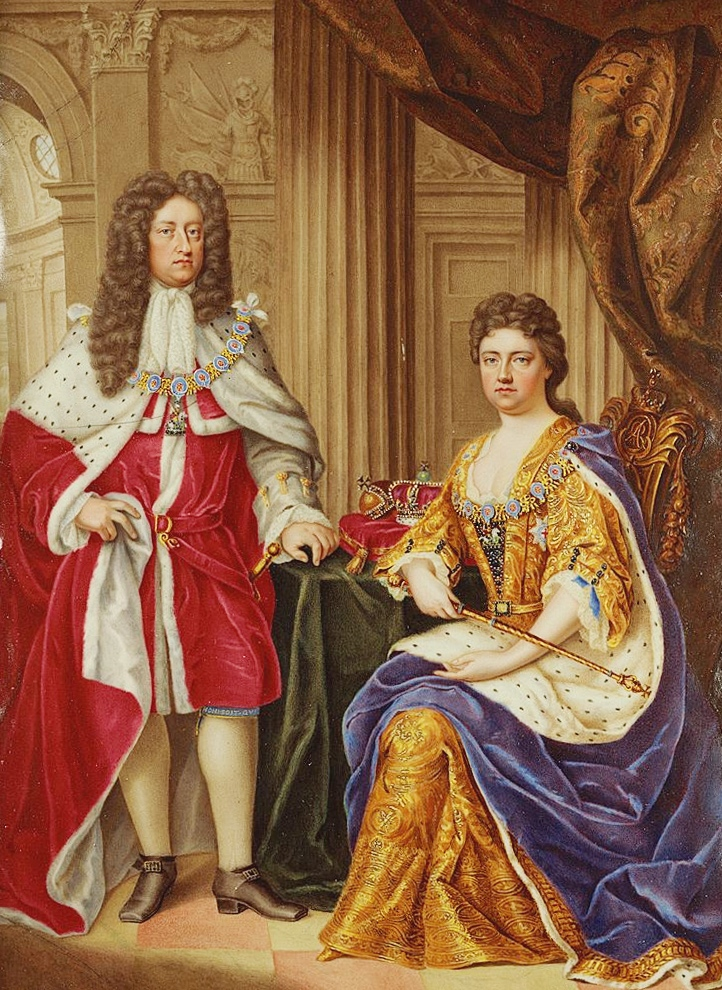
Enamel portrait of Prince George and his wife Queen Anne by Charles Boit, 1706

In March and April 1706, George was seriously ill. There was blood in his sputum, but he seemed to recover, although he was too ill to attend a thanksgiving service at St Paul's Cathedral in June for a British victory in the Battle of Ramillies. He missed another thanksgiving service in May 1707, to celebrate the union of England and Scotland, as he was recuperating at Hampton Court.

The Scilly naval disaster of 1707, in which a fleet commanded by Sir Cloudesley Shovell foundered, highlighted mismanagement at the Admiralty, for which George was nominally responsible. Pressure grew to replace Admiral Churchill with someone more dynamic. By October 1708, five powerful politicians, known as the Whig Junto—Lords Somers, Halifax, Orford, Wharton and Sunderland—were clamouring for the removal of both Prince George and Churchill. Marlborough wrote to his brother telling him to resign, but Churchill refused, protected by Prince George.

Amid the political pressure, George was on his deathbed, suffering from severe asthma and dropsy. He died at 1:30 pm on 28 October 1708 at Kensington Palace, aged 55. The Queen was devastated. James Brydges wrote to General Cadogan,

His death has flung the Queen into an unspeakable grief. She never left him till he was dead, but continued kissing him the very moment his breath went out of his body, and 'twas with a great deal of difficulty my Lady Marlborough prevailed upon her to leave him.

Anne wrote to her nephew, Frederick IV of Denmark, "the loss of such a husband, who loved me so dearly and so devotedly, is too crushing for me to be able to bear it as I ought." Anne was desperate to stay at Kensington with the body of her husband, but under pressure from the Duchess of Marlborough, she reluctantly left Kensington for St James's Palace. Anne resented the Duchess's intrusive actions, which included removing a portrait of George from the Queen's bedchamber and then refusing to return it, in the belief that it was natural "to avoid seeing of papers or anything that belonged to one that one loved when they were just dead". Anne and the Duchess had been very close, but their friendship had become strained over political differences. The immediate aftermath of George's death damaged their relationship further. He was buried privately at midnight on 13 November in Westminster Abbey.

== Legacy ==
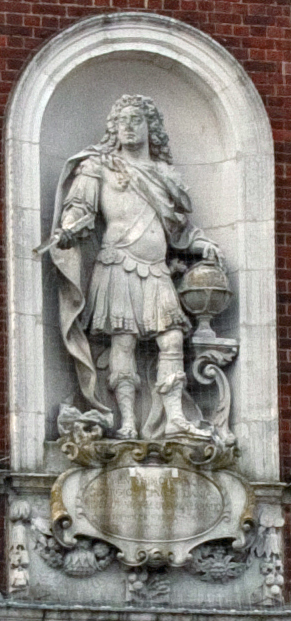
Statue of Prince George on Windsor Guildhall, erected 1713

Anne refused initially to appoint a new Lord High Admiral, and insisted on carrying out the duties of the office herself, without appointing a member of the government to take George's place. She burst into tears on the first occasion she was brought papers to sign in George's stead. Undeterred, the Junto demanded the appointment of Lord Orford, a member of the Junto and one of Prince George's leading critics, as First Lord of the Admiralty. Admiral Churchill retired, and Anne appointed the moderate Tory Lord Pembroke to lead the Admiralty, instead of a Whig. The Junto Whigs Somers and Wharton, however, were appointed to the Cabinet in Pembroke's vacated posts of Lord President of the Council and Lord Lieutenant of Ireland. The Whigs were still dissatisfied, and continued to pressure Pembroke and the Queen. Pembroke resigned after less than a year in office. Another month of arguments followed before the Queen finally consented to put Orford in control of the Admiralty as First Lord in November 1709.

=== Personal traits and portrayal ===
Charles II, Anne's uncle, famously said of Prince George, "I have tried him drunk, and I have tried him sober and there is nothing in him". He was quiet and self-effacing. John Macky thought him "of a familiar, easy disposition with a good sound understanding but modest in showing it ... very fat, loves news, his bottle & the Queen." In making fun of George's asthma, Lord Mulgrave said the Prince was forced to breathe hard in case people mistook him for dead and buried him. By the time of Queen Victoria, George had a reputation as a dullard, and was the target of disdain. Victoria hoped her own husband, Prince Albert, would never fill the "subordinate part played by the very stupid and insignificant husband of Queen Anne". In the 1930s, Winston Churchill said he "mattered very little", except to Anne.

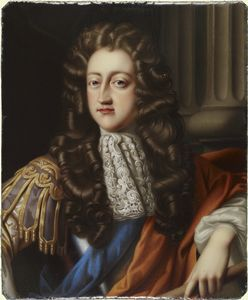
Miniature in the Royal Collection by Henry Pierce Bone, 1841. Purchased by Prince Albert.

He had little impact on the running of the navy, but he was interested enough in navigation and welfare at sea to sponsor the publication of John Flamsteed's Observations in 1704. He was not one of the most colourful political characters of his day—he was content to spend his time building model ships—but he was a loyal and supportive husband to Queen Anne. Their marriage was a devoted, loving and faithful one, though beset by personal tragedy.

The previous husband of a British queen regnant, William of Orange, had become king, refusing to take a subordinate rank to Mary. William and Mary had exemplified the traditional gender roles of seventeenth-century Europe: Mary was the dutiful wife and William held the power. George and Anne, however, reversed the roles: George was the dutiful husband and it was Anne who exercised the royal prerogatives. William had assumed incorrectly that George would use his marriage to Anne as a means of building a separate power base in Britain, but George never challenged his wife's authority and never strove to accrue influence. Anne occasionally used the image of wifely virtue to escape unpalatable situations by claiming, as a woman, she knew "nothing except what the prince tells me", but it was an artifice. Husbands had a legal right to their wife's property, and it was argued that it was unnatural and against the church's teachings for a man to be subject to his wife. George made no such claim or demand; he was content to remain a prince and duke. "I am her Majesty's subject", he said, "I shall do naught but what she commands me." In the words of historian Anne Somerset, "the fact that Prince George was widely regarded as a nonentity helped reconcile people to his anomalous status, and so, almost by accident, George achieved a major advance for feminism." Winston Churchill wrote that he

was a fine-looking man, tall, blond, and good-natured ... He was neither clever nor learned—a simple, normal man without envy or ambition, and disposed by remarkable appetite and thirst for all the pleasures of the table. Charles's well-known verdict ... does not do justice to the homely virtues and unfailing good-humour of his staid and trustworthy character.

The Prince of Denmark's March by Jeremiah Clarke was written in his honour, and Prince George's County, Maryland, was named after him in 1696. Portraits by Sir Godfrey Kneller are at the National Maritime Museum in Greenwich, Drumlanrig Castle in Dumfriesshire, and (in a double portrait with George Clarke) All Souls College, Oxford. Portraits in Denmark include one by Willem Wissing in the Reedtz-Thott collection and one by Karel van Mander in the national collection at Frederiksborg Palace.

Prince George was a character in the 2015 play Queen Anne by Helen Edmundson. Despite being alive and married to Queen Anne for the majority of the timeframe depicted in 2018 period comedy film The Favourite, he was not depicted at all.

== Titles, styles, honours and arms ==
=== Titles ===
- 2 April 1653 – 10 April 1689: His Royal Highness Prince George of Denmark and Norway
- 10 April 1689 – 28 October 1708: His Royal Highness Prince George of Denmark and Norway, Duke of Cumberland

=== Honours ===
- R af E: Knight of the Elephant, from birth
- KG: Knight of the Garter, 1 January 1684

Honorary military appointments

- 1689–1708: Colonel-in-Chief of the 3rd (Prince George of Denmark's) Regiment of Foot

Other appointments

- 1702–1708: Lord Warden of the Cinque Ports

=== Arms ===
The royal coat of arms of Denmark-Norway with a label of three points Argent, each with three Ermine points. The whole surmounted by a crown of a prince of Denmark and Norway. His crest was "out of a coronet Or, a demi-lion rampant guardant Azure, crowned of the first".

Coat of arms of Prince George, Duke of Cumberland, Knight of the Garter

== Issue ==
		Birth	Death	Notes
1	Stillborn daughter	12 May 1684		
2	Mary	2 June 1685	8 February 1687	died in early childhood
3	Anne Sophia	12 May 1686	2 February 1687	died in early childhood
4	Miscarriage	21 January 1687		
5	Stillborn son	22 October 1687		
6	Miscarriage	16 April 1688		
7	Prince William, Duke of Gloucester	24 July 1689	30 July 1700	
8	Mary	14 October 1690		died at birth
9	George	17 April 1692		died at birth
10	Stillborn daughter	23 March 1693		
11	Stillborn child	21 January 1694 (Note: Contemporary chronicler Narcissus Luttrell did not specify a gender, saying only that Anne "miscarried of a dead child". Modern historians Edward Gregg and Alison Weir do not agree on whether it was a son or possibly a daughter.)		
12	Miscarried daughter	17 or 18 February 1696		
13	Miscarriage	20 September 1696 (Note: Luttrell said Anne "miscarried of a son". Dr Nathaniel Johnson told Theophilus Hastings, 7th Earl of Huntingdon, in a letter dated 24 October 1696, "Her Royal Highness miscarried of two children, the one of seven months' growth, the other of two or three months, as her physicians and midwife judged: one was born the day after the other." If so, the smaller foetus was probably a blighted twin.)		
14	Miscarriage	25 March 1697		
15	Miscarriage	early December 1697 (Note: According to L'Hermitage, the Dutch resident in London, Anne miscarried twins who were "too early to determine their sex". Other sources say the pregnancy ended in a stillborn son, or "two male children, at least as far as could be recognised".)		
16	Stillborn son	15 September 1698		
17	Stillborn son	24 January 1700		

== Ancestry ==
Ancestors of Prince George of Denmark

8. Frederick II of Denmark
4. Christian IV of Denmark
9. Sophie of Mecklenburg-Güstrow
2. Frederick III of Denmark
10. Joachim Frederick, Elector of Brandenburg
5. Anne Catherine of Brandenburg
11. Catherine of Brandenburg-Küstrin
1. Prince George of Denmark
12. William, Duke of Brunswick-Lüneburg
6. George, Duke of Brunswick-Lüneburg
13. Dorothea of Denmark
3. Sophie Amalie of Brunswick-Lüneburg
14. Louis V, Landgrave of Hesse-Darmstadt
7. Anne Eleonore of Hesse-Darmstadt
15. Magdalene of Brandenburg

== Sources ==
Prince George of Denmark House of Oldenburg Born: 2 April 1653 Died: 28 October 1708
British royalty
Vacant Title last held by Mary of Modena as queen consort	Consort of the British monarch 1702–1708	Vacant Title next held by Caroline of Ansbach as queen consort
Honorary titles
Preceded by The Earl of Pembroke	Lord High Admiral; 1702–1708	Succeeded by The Queen
Preceded by The Earl of Romney	Lord Warden of the Cinque Ports; 1702–1708	Succeeded by The Duke of Dorset
