= Royal Collection =

Art collection of the British Royal Family

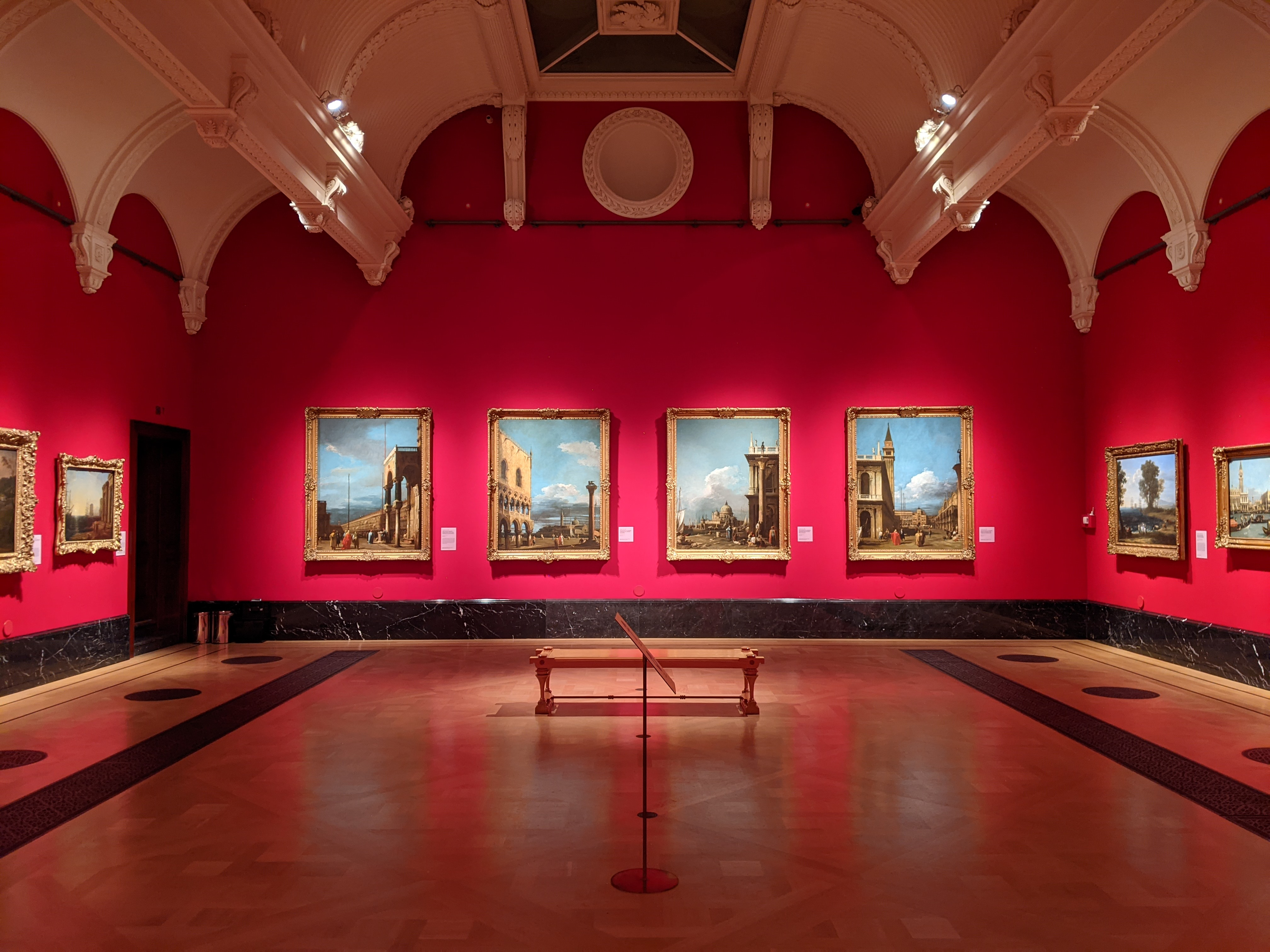
Art exhibition at the King's Gallery, Buckingham Palace (Note: Masterpieces from Buckingham Palace, May 2021 – February 2022. All these paintings normally hang in the palace's Picture Gallery. From left to right: Claude Lorrain, Harbour Scene at Sunset (1643); Canaletto, The Piazzetta Looking North-West with the Narthex of San Marco (c. 1723–24); Canaletto, The Piazzetta Looking towards San Giorgio Maggiore (c. 1723–24); Canaletto, The Piazzetta Looking towards Santa Maria della Salute (c. 1723–24); Canaletto, The Piazzetta Looking North towards the Torre dell'Orologio (c. 1723–24); Claude Lorrain, Coast Scene with the Rape of Europa (1667); Canaletto, The Bacino di San Marco on Ascension Day (c. 1733–34))

The Royal Collection of the British royal family is the largest private art collection in the world.

Spread among 13 occupied and historic royal residences in the United Kingdom, the collection is owned by King Charles III and overseen by the Royal Collection Trust. The British monarch owns some of the collection in right of the Crown and some as a private individual. It is made up of more than one million objects, including 7,000 paintings, more than 150,000 works on paper, this including 30,000 watercolours and drawings, and about 450,000 photographs, as well as around 700,000 works of art, including tapestries, furniture, ceramics, textiles, carriages, weapons, armour, jewellery, clocks, musical instruments, tableware, plants, manuscripts, books, and sculptures.

Some of the buildings which house the collection, such as Hampton Court Palace, are open to the public and not lived in by the royal family, whilst others, such as Windsor Castle and Kensington Palace, are both residences and open to the public. The public King's Gallery at Buckingham Palace in London was purpose-built in the mid-20th century to exhibit pieces from the collection on a rotating basis. There is a similar art gallery next to the Palace of Holyroodhouse in Edinburgh, and a Drawings Gallery at Windsor Castle. The Crown Jewels are on public display in the Jewel House at the Tower of London.

About 3,000 objects are on loan to museums throughout the world, and many others are lent on a temporary basis to exhibitions.

== History ==
Few items from before Henry VIII survive. The most important additions were made by Charles I, a passionate collector of Italian paintings and a major patron of van Dyck and other Flemish artists. He purchased the bulk of the Gonzaga collection from the Duchy of Mantua. The entire Royal Collection, which included 1,500 paintings and 500 statues, was sold after Charles's execution in 1649. The 'Sale of the Late King's Goods' at Somerset House raised £185,000 for the English Republic. Other items were given away in lieu of payment to settle the King's debts. A number of pieces were recovered by Charles II after the Restoration of the monarchy in 1660, and they form the basis for the collection today. The Dutch Republic also presented Charles with the Dutch Gift of 28 paintings, 12 sculptures, and a selection of furniture. He went on to buy many paintings and other works.

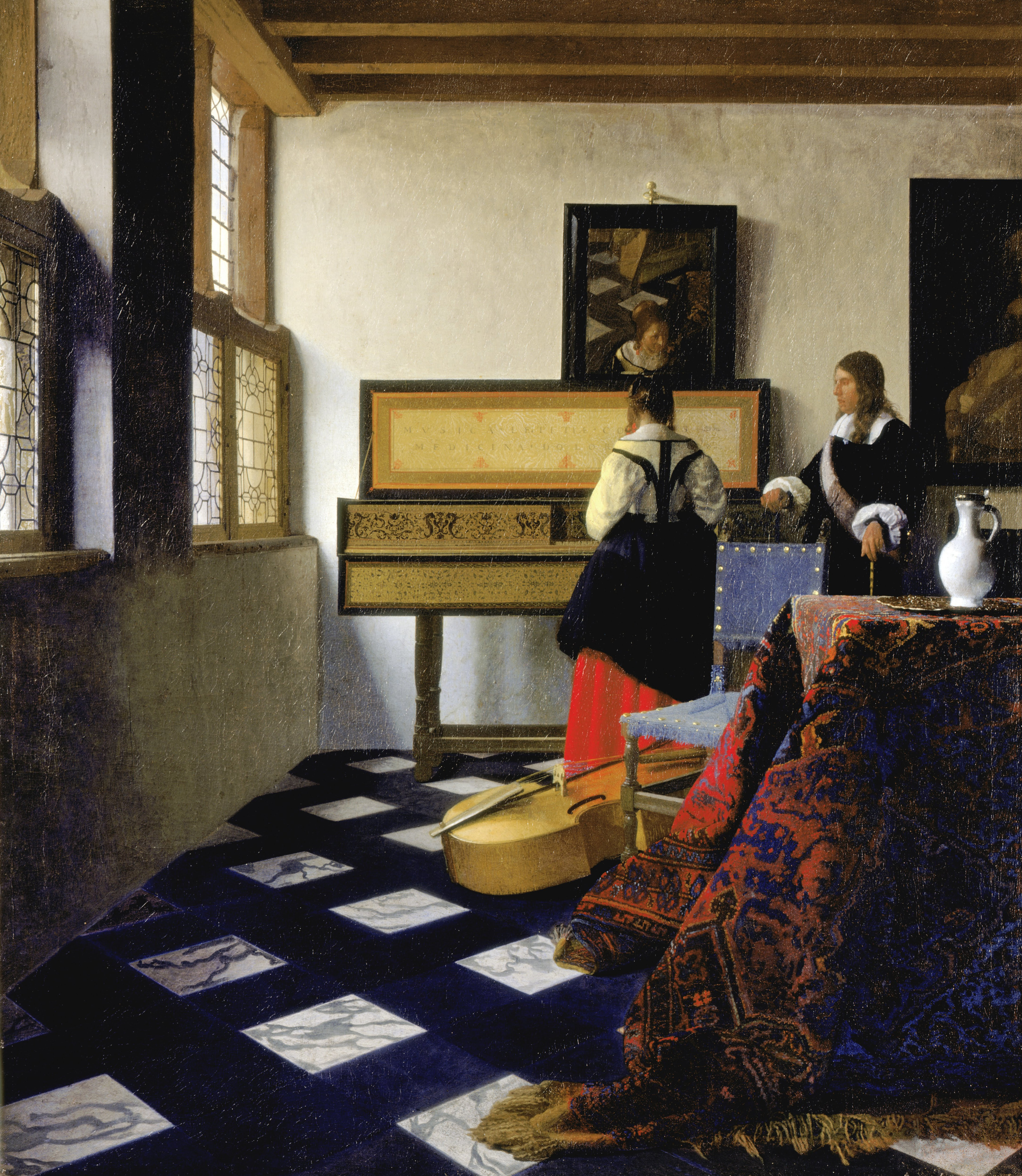
Johannes Vermeer, The Music Lesson, c. 1660, was acquired by George III in 1762.

George III was mainly responsible for forming the collection's outstanding holdings of Old Master drawings; large numbers of these, and many Venetian paintings including more than 40 Canalettos, joined the collection when he bought the collection of Joseph "Consul Smith", which also included a large number of books. Many other drawings were bought from Alessandro Albani, cardinal and art dealer in Rome.

George IV shared Charles I's enthusiasm for collecting, buying up large numbers of Dutch Golden Age paintings and their Flemish contemporaries. Like other English collectors, he took advantage of the great quantities of French decorative art on the London market after the French Revolution, and is mostly responsible for the collection's outstanding holdings of 18th-century French furniture and porcelain, especially Sèvres. He also bought much contemporary English silver, and many recent and contemporary English paintings. Queen Victoria and her husband Albert were keen collectors of contemporary and old master paintings.

Many objects have been given from the collection to museums, especially by George III and Victoria and Albert. In particular, the King's Library formed by George III with the assistance of his librarian Frederick Augusta Barnard, consisting of 65,000 printed books, was given to the British Museum and later transferred to the British Library, where they remain as a distinct collection. He also donated the "Old Royal Library" of some 2,000 manuscripts, which are still segregated as the Royal manuscripts. The core of this collection was the purchase by James I of the related collections of Humphrey Llwyd, John Lumley, 1st Baron Lumley, and the Henry FitzAlan, 19th Earl of Arundel. Prince Albert's will requested the donation of a number of mostly early paintings to the National Gallery, which Queen Victoria fulfilled.

=== Modern era ===
External videos
- The Royal Collection in the Reign of Queen Elizabeth II (53:08) – lecture by Caroline de Guitaut, the then Deputy Surveyor of the King's Works of Art, Haughton International Seminar 2023

Throughout the reign of Elizabeth II (1952–2022), there were significant additions to the collection through judicious purchases, bequests, and gifts from nation states and official bodies. According to guidelines drawn up in 1995 and updated in 2003, gifts given to the royal family by foreign heads of state and dignitaries in an official capacity cannot be sold or traded and automatically become part of the Royal Collection. Since 1952, approximately 2,500 works have been added to the Royal Collection. The Commonwealth is strongly represented in this manner: an example is 75 contemporary Canadian watercolours that entered the collection between 1985 and 2001 as a gift from the Canadian Society of Painters in Water Colour. Modern art acquired by Elizabeth II includes pieces by Sir Anish Kapoor, Lucian Freud, and Andy Warhol. In 2002 it was revealed that 20 paintings (excluding works on paper) were acquired by the Queen in the first 50 years of her reign, mostly portraits of previous monarchs or their close relatives. Eight were purchased at auction, six bought from dealers, three commissioned, two donated or bequeathed, and one was a purchase from Winchester Cathedral.

In 1987 a new department of the Royal Household was established to oversee the Royal Collection, and it was financed by the commercial activities of Royal Collection Enterprises, a limited company. Before then, it was maintained using the monarch's official income paid by the Civil List. Since 1993 the collection has been funded by entrance fees to Windsor Castle and Buckingham Palace.

In 2023, ten portraits in the collection were unveiled as Windrush: Portraits of a Pioneering Generation, marking the 75th anniversary of the arrival of HMT Empire Windrush in Britain. Commissioned by Charles III while Prince of Wales, the series included portraits of Delisser Bernard by Honor Titus, Edna Henry by Amy Sherald, and Carmen Munroe by Sonia Boyce. The works were exhibited at the Palace of Holyroodhouse and subsequently at the National Portrait Gallery in London.

== Collection ==
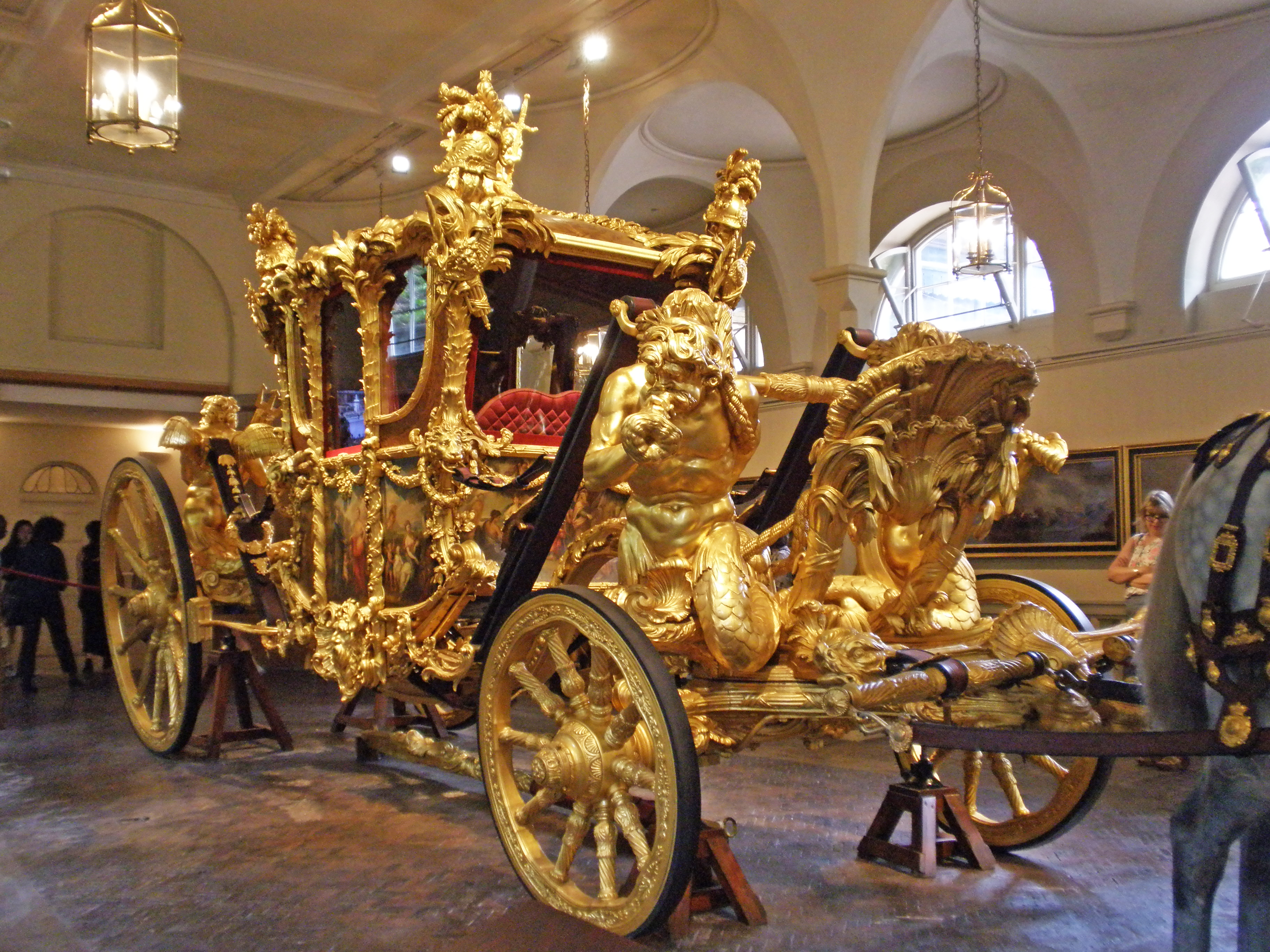
The oak-gilt Gold State Coach was commissioned by George III in 1760 and is housed at the Royal Mews.

A computerised inventory of the collection was started in early 1991, and it was completed in December 1997. The full inventory is not available to the public, though catalogues of parts of the collection – especially paintings – have been published, and a searchable database on the Royal Collection website is increasingly comprehensive, with 300,093 items accessible in August 2026.

About a third of the 7,000 paintings in the collection are on view or stored at buildings in London which fall under the remit of the Historic Royal Palaces agency: the Tower of London, Hampton Court Palace, Kensington Palace, Banqueting House, Whitehall, and Kew Palace.

The Jewel House at the Tower of London also house the Crown Jewels. A rotating selection of art, furniture, jewellery, and other items considered to be of the highest quality is shown at the King's Gallery, a purpose-built exhibition centre adjoining Buckingham Palace. Many objects are displayed in the palace itself, the state rooms of which are open to visitors for much of the year, as well as in Windsor Castle, Holyrood Palace in Edinburgh, the Royal Pavilion in Brighton, and Osborne House on the Isle of Wight. Some works are on long-term or permanent loan to museums and other places; the most famous of these are the Raphael Cartoons, in the Victoria and Albert Museum in London since 1865.

=== Paintings, prints and drawings ===
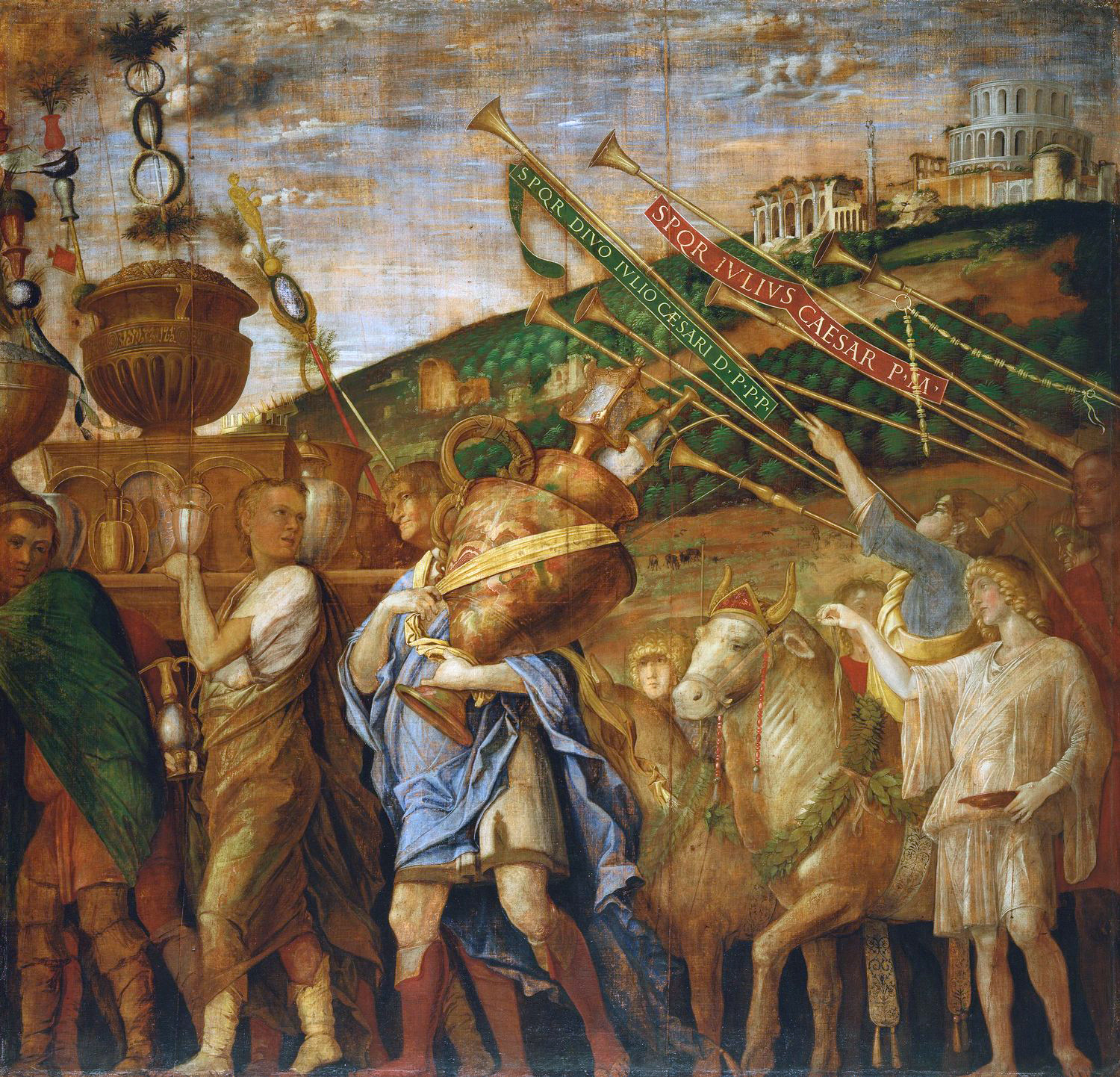
Andrea Mantegna, Triumphs of Caesar: The Vase Bearers, c. 1484–1492, acquired by Charles I

The collection's holdings of Western fine art are among the largest and most important assemblages in existence, with works of the highest quality, and, in many cases, artists' oeuvres cannot be fully understood without a study of the holdings contained within the Royal Collection. There are more than 7,000 paintings, spread across the Royal residences and palaces. The collection does not claim to provide a comprehensive, chronological survey of Western fine art but it has been shaped by the individual tastes of kings, queens and their families over the past 500 years.

The prints and drawings collection is based in the Print Room, Windsor, and is exceptionally strong, with famous holdings of drawings by Leonardo da Vinci (550), Raphael, Michelangelo and Hans Holbein the Younger (85). A large part of the Old Master drawings were acquired by George III. Starting in early 2019, 144 of Leonardo da Vinci's drawings from the Collection went on display in 12 locations in the UK. From May to October that year, 200 of the drawings were on display in the King's Gallery at Buckingham Palace.

Anglo-American
- Benjamin West – at least 60 paintings
Dutch (200+ works)
- Abraham Bloemaert – at least 1 painting
- Gerard ter Borch – at least 2 paintings
- Jan Dirksz Both – at least 1 painting
- Jan de Bray – at least 1 painting
- Hendrick ter Brugghen – at least 1 painting
- Aelbert Cuyp – at least 7 paintings
- Gerrit Dou – at least 4 paintings
- Frans Hals – at least 1 painting
- Hugo van der Goes – at least 1 painting
- Maarten van Heemskerck – at least 2 paintings
- Jan van der Heyden – at least 2 paintings
- Meyndert Hobbema – at least 2 paintings
- Melchior d'Hondecoeter – at least 4 paintings
- Gerard van Honthorst – at least 6 paintings
- Pieter de Hooch – at least 3 paintings
- Nicolaes Maes – at least 1 painting
- Jan Mertens the Younger – at least 1 painting
- Gabriel Metsu – at least 1 painting
- Daniël Mijtens – at least 9 paintings
- Adriaen van Ostade – at least 5 paintings
- Rembrandt – at least 6 paintings
- Salomon van Ruysdael – at least 1 painting
- Jacob Isaakszoon van Ruisdael – at least 1 painting
- Jan Steen – at least 7 paintings
- Adriaen van de Velde – at least 4 paintings
- Willem van de Velde the Younger – at least 7 paintings
- Johannes Vermeer – at least 1 painting (see image)
- Jan Weenix – at least 1 painting:
- Adriaen van der Werff – at least 1 painting
- Philip Wouwerman – at least 5 paintings
English
- William Beechey – at least 17 paintings
- Thomas Gainsborough – at least 33 paintings, including a rare mythological work, Diana and Actaeon
- William Hogarth – at least 3 paintings
- John Hoppner – at least 7 paintings
- Cornelis Janssens van Ceulen – at least 2 paintings
- Sir Godfrey Kneller – at least 15 paintings
- Edwin Henry Landseer – at least 100 paintings and drawings
- Thomas Lawrence – at least 50 paintings
- Peter Lely – at least 20 paintings
- Joshua Reynolds – at least 20 paintings
- George Stubbs – at least 18 paintings
- Sahara Longe - at least 1 painting
Flemish
- Jan Brueghel the Elder – at least 1 painting
- Pieter Bruegel the Elder – at least 1 painting
- Denys Calvaert – at least 1 painting
- Joos van Cleve – at least 4 paintings
- Pieter van Coninxloo – at least 1 painting
- Anthony van Dyck – at least 26 paintings
- Frans Francken the Younger – at least 1 painting
- Marcus Gheeraerts the Younger – at least 1 painting
- Frans Hals – at least 1 painting
- Jan Mabuse – at least 1 painting
- Quentin Matsys – at least 1 painting
- Hans Memling – at least 1 painting
- Frans Pourbus the younger – at least 2 paintings
- Jan Provoost – at least 1 painting
- Peter Paul Rubens – at least 13 paintings, 5 drawings (see image)
- David Teniers the Younger – at least 27 paintings
French
- François Clouet – at least 3 paintings
- Jean Clouet – at least 1 painting, 1 miniature
- Hippolyte Delaroche – at least 3 paintings
- Gaspard Dughet – at least 3 paintings
- Nicolas de Largillière – at least 1 painting
- Jean-Étienne Liotard – at least 16 paintings
- Claude Lorrain – at least 5 paintings
- Claude Monet – at least 1 painting
- Louis Le Nain – at least 1 painting
- Jean-Baptiste Pater – at least 4 paintings
- Nicolas Poussin – at least a large collection of his drawings at Windsor, second only to that in the Louvre
- Eustache Le Sueur – at least 1 painting
- Georges de La Tour – at least 1 painting
- Simon Vouet – at least 1 painting
German
- Albrecht Dürer – at least 1 painting
- Hans Holbein the Younger – at least 7 paintings, 80 drawings and 5 miniatures
- Lucas Cranach the Elder – at least 5 paintings
- Lucas Cranach the Younger – at least 1 painting
- Georg Pencz – at least 1 painting
- Franz Xaver Winterhalter – at least 120 paintings, 20 drawings & watercolours
- Johann Zoffany – at least 17 paintings
Italian
- Niccolò dell'Abbate – at least 1 painting
- Alessandro Allori – at least 1 painting
- Fra Angelico – at least 1 painting
- Jacopo Bassano – at least 6 paintings
- Leandro Bassano – at least 3 paintings
- Giovanni Bellini – at least 1 painting
- Gian Lorenzo Bernini – at least 50 drawings
- Francesco Borromini – at least 100 drawings
- Bronzino (Agnolo di Cosimo) – at least 1 painting
- Canaletto (Giovanni Antonio Canal) – at least 50 paintings and 140 drawings
- Caravaggio (Michelangelo Merisi da Caravaggio) – at least 2 paintings
- Polidoro da Caravaggio – at least 9 paintings
- Giovanni Cariani – at least 2 paintings
- Luca Carlevaris – at least 4 paintings
- Agostino, Annibale and Ludovico Carracci – at least 5 paintings, more than 350 drawings
- Cima da Conegliano – at least 1 painting
- Jacopo di Cione – at least 1 painting
- Antonio da Correggio – at least 2 paintings
- Giovanni Benedetto Castiglione – at least 260 drawings
- Bernardo Daddi – at least 1 painting
- Carlo Dolci – at least 1 painting
- Domenichino (Domenico Zampieri) – at least 1 painting, as well as 1,700 drawings in 34 albums, the Royal Collection's largest holdings by a single artist
- Dosso Dossi – at least 2 paintings
- Duccio – at least 1 painting
- Gentile da Fabriano – at least 1 painting
- Girolamo Forabosco – at least 1 painting
- Domenico Fetti – at least 14 paintings
- Lattanzio Gambara – at least 8 paintings
- Benvenuto Tisi (Il Garofalo) – at least 1 painting
- Raffaellino del Garbo – at least 1 painting
- Artemisia Gentileschi – at least 1 painting
- Orazio Gentileschi – at least 2 paintings
- Luca Giordano – at least 12 paintings
- Guercino (Giovanni Francesco Barbieri) – at least 1 painting, and largest group of Guercino drawings in the world, some 400 sheets, as well as 200 by his assistants and 200 other works
- Leonardo da Vinci – at least 600 drawings, finest collection of Leonardo drawings in the world
- Bernardino Licinio – at least 4 paintings
- Pietro Longhi – at least 2 paintings
- Lorenzo Lotto – at least 3 paintings – at least Portrait of Andrea Odoni
- Andrea Mantegna – at least 9 canvases known as The Triumphs of Caesar
- Ludovico Mazzolino – at least 1 painting
- Michelangelo – at least 20 drawings
- Parmigianino (Francesco Mazzola) – at least 2 paintings and 30 drawings
- Pietro Perugino – at least 1 painting
- Francesco Pesellino – at least 1 painting
- Pontormo (Jacopo da Pontormo) – at least 1 painting
- Raphael – at least 8 paintings, as well as an extensive collection of drawings. There are seven full-size cartoons for the tapestries designed to hang in the Sistine Chapel. During the eighteenth and early nineteenth centuries, Raphael attained the zenith of his reputation. Consequently, the Raphael Cartoons have become some of the most famous, and widely imitated, paintings in the world. Since 1865 they have been on loan from the Royal Collection to the V&A.
- Guido Reni – at least 1 painting
- Sebastiano Ricci – at least 14 paintings
- Girolamo Romanino – at least 1 painting
- Giulio Romano – at least 6 paintings
- Andrea Sacchi – at least 130 drawings
- Francesco de' Rossi (Il Salviati) – at least 1 painting
- Andrea del Sarto – at least 2 paintings
- Girolamo Savoldo – at least 2 paintings
- Andrea Schiavone – at least 2 paintings
- Bernardo Strozzi – at least 1 painting
- Zanobi Strozzi – at least 1 painting
- Tintoretto – at least 5 paintings
- Titian (Tiziano Vecelli) – at least 4 paintings
- Alessandro Turchi – at least 4 paintings
- Perin del Vaga – at least 2 paintings
- Giorgio Vasari – at least 1 painting
- Palma Vecchio – at least 2 paintings
- Paolo Veronese – at least 3 paintings
- Antonio Verrio – at least 1 painting
- Francesco Zuccarelli – at least 27 paintings, together with 8 works collaborated with Antonio Visentini
- Federico Zuccari – at least 1 painting

=== Furniture ===
The Royal Collection holds one of the largest and finest collections of classic French furniture to survive the French Revolution, totalling more than 300 items. The collection is noted for its encyclopedic range, as well as the works of some of the greatest cabinetmakers of the ancien régime.

French furniture
- Joseph Baumhauer – Bas d'armoire, c. 1765–70
- Pierre-Antoine Bellangé – at least 13 items, including:
  Deux paire de Pedestals, inset with porcelain plaques, c. 1820
  Paire de pier table, c. 1823–1824 (The Blue Drawing Room, Buckingham Palace)
  Paire de petit pier table, c. 1823–24 (The Blue Drawing Room, Buckingham Palace)
  Side table, c. 1820
  Paire de secretaire, c. 1827-28
  Paire de cabinets, (see pietra dura section), c. 1820
- André-Charles Boulle – at least 13 items, including:
  Armoire, c. 1700 (The Grand Corridor, Windsor Castle)
  Armoire, c. 1700 (The Grand Corridor, Windsor Castle)
  Cabinet (en première-partie), c. 1700 (The Grand Corridor, Windsor Castle)
  Cabinet (en contre-partie), c. 1700 (The Grand Corridor, Windsor Castle)
  Cabinet, (without stand, similar to ones in the State Hermitage Museum and the collections of the Duke of Buccleuch)
  Paire de bas d'armoire, (The Grand Corridor, Windsor Castle)
  Writing table, possibly delivered to Louis, the Grand Dauphin (1661–1711), c. 1680
  Paire de torchère, c. 1700
  Bureau Plat, c. 1710 (The Rubens Room, Windsor Castle)
  Petit gaines, attributed to., early 18th century
- Martin Carlin – at least 2 items:
  Cabinet (commode à vantaux), (see pietra dura section), c. 1778
  Cabinet, mounted with Sèvres plaques, c. 1783
- Jacob-Desmalter & Cie – at least 1 item:
  Bureau à cylindre, c. 1825
- Jacob Frères – at least 1 item:
  Writing-table, c. 1805
- Gérard-Jean Galle – at least 1 item:
  Candelabra x2, early 19th century
- Pierre Garnier – at least 2 items:
  Paire de cabinets, c. 1770
- Georges Jacob – at least 30 items, including:
  Petit sofa, c. 1790
  Tête-à-tête, c. 1790
  Fauteuil, c. 1790
  Lit à la Polonaise, c. 1790
  Small armchairs and settees, suite of 20, c. 1786
  Armchairs x4, c. 1786
- Gilles Joubert – at least 2 items:
  Pair of Pedestals, delivered for the bedroom of Louis XV at Versailles, c. 1762
- Pierre Langlois – at least 5 items, including:
  Commode, c. 1765 Deux paire de commode, c. 1763
- Étienne Levasseur – at least 7 items:
  Side-table, attributed to, c. 1770 Deux paire de gaines, attributed to, c. 1770 Deux secretaire, adapted from an Andre-Charles Boulle table en bureau, c. 1770
- Martin-Eloy Lignereux – at least 2 items:
  Paire de cabinets, (see pietra dura section), c. 1803
- Bernard Molitor – at least 3 items:
  Commode, c. 1780
  Paire de secretaires, c. 1815
- Bernard II van Risamburgh – at least 2 items:
  Centre-table, c. 1775
  Commode, c. 1745
- Jean Henri Riesener – at least 6 items:
  Commode, delivered to Louis XVI's "Chambre du Roi" at Versailles, c. 1774;
  Paire de encoignure, delivered to Louis XVI's "Chambre du Roi" at Versailles, c. 1774;
  Jewel-cabinet, delivered to Marie Joséphine of Savoy, c. 1787
  Writing-table, c. 1785
  Bureau à cylindre, c. 1775
- Sèvres – at least 1 item:
  Centre-table, 'The Table of the Grand Commanders', c. 1806–12 (The Blue Drawing Room, Buckingham Palace)
- Pierre-Philippe Thomire – at least 15 items, including:
  Pedestal, c. 1813
  Pedestal for the equestrian statue of Louis XIV, c. 1826
  Paire de candelabra, 8 light, c. 1828
  Torchères x11, c. 1814
  Clock, mounts attributed to., 1803
  Candelabra x2, early 19th century
- Benjamin Vulliamy & Benjamin Lewis Vulliamy – at least 4 items:
  Torchere x4, 1814
- Benjamin Vulliamy – at least 3 items:
  Candelabra x2, 1811
  Mantel clock, c. 1780
- Adam Weisweiler – at least 13 items:
  Cabinet, inset with a Sèvres plaque, late 18th century
  Cabinet, (see pietra dura section), 1780
  Side Table, (see pietra dura section), c. 1780
  Side Table, (see pietra dura section), c. 1785 (The Green Drawing Room, Buckingham Palace)
  Paire de pier-table, in chinoiserie style, c. 1787–1790
  Commode, c. 1785
  Console-table x4, c.1785
  Paire de petit bas d'armoire, manner of. boulle, late 18th century
Other European furniture
- Robert Hume (English) – at least 1 item:
  Pair of cabinets, (see pietra dura section), c. 1820
- Unknown (Flemish) – at least 2 items:
  Cabinet-on-stand, c. 1660
  Cabinet-on-stand, 17th century
- Johann Daniel Sommer (German) – at least 2 items:
  Pair of cabinets-on-stand, attributed to. (stands English), late 17th century
- Melchior Baumgartner (German) – at least 2 items:
  Organ Clock, 1664
  Cabinet, (see Pietra Dura section), c. 1660
- Unknown (Dutch) – at least 1 item:
  Secretaire-cabinet, in boulle marquetry, c. 1700
- Pietra Dura – at least 11 items:
  Cabinet, Augsburg, attributed to Melchior Baumgartner, c. 1660
  Cabinet, Italian, c. 1680
  Cabinet, Adam Weisweiler – at least inset with pietra dura panels, 1780 (The Green Drawing Room, Buckingham Palace)
  Side Table, Adam Weisweiler – at least inset with pietra dura panels, c. 1780 (The Silk Tapestry Room, Buckingham Palace)
  Cabinet (commode à vantaux), Martin Carlin – at least inset with pietra dura panels re-used from Louis XIVs great Florentine cabinets, c. 1778 (The Silk Tapestry Room, Buckingham Palace)
  Casket, Italian: Florentine, c. 1720
  Paire de cabinets, Martin-Eloy Lignereux – at least inset with Florentine plaques, c. 1803
  - Paire de cabinets, Pierre-Antoine Bellangé – at least inset with precious stones based on a Florentine design by Baccio del Bianco, c. 1820
  Pair of cabinets, Robert Hume, c. 1820 (The Crimson Drawing Room, Windsor Castle)
  Four Florentine pietra dura panels on 18th century cabinets, re-adapted, c. 1820s (The White Drawing Room, Buckingham Palace)
- Miscellaneous:
  Cabinet-on-stand, magnificent example composed of ebony, mid-17th century
  Bureau, magnificent example similar to a version in both the V&A and the Getty Center, 1690–95
  Bureaux Mazarin x2, in Boulle style, late 17th century
  Bureaux Mazarin x2, in Boulle style, c. 1700 (The Ballroom, Windsor Castle)
  Bureaux Mazarin, late 17th century (The West Gallery, Buckingham Palace)
  Deux paire de boulle bas d'cabinets

=== Sculpture and decorative arts ===
Clocks
- André-Charles Boulle – at least 4 items:
  Mantle clock, c. 1710 (The Green Drawing Room, Windsor Castle)
  Pedestal clock, (Similar to ones in Blenheim Palace, Palace of Versailles, Metropolitan Museum of Art, Frick Collection and the Cleveland Museum of Art)
  Pedestal clock, late 17th century;
  Pedestal clock, c. 1720
- Abraham-Louis Breguet – at least 1 item:
  Empire regulator clock, 1825
- De La Croix – at least 1 item:
  Large clock, raised on a bronze plaque plinth, c. 1775 (The East Gallery, Buckingham Palace)
- Gérard-Jean Galle – at least 1 item:
  Clock, figures and frieze representing the Oath of the Horaatii, early 19th century
- Jean-Pierre Latz – at least 2 items:
  Pedestal Clock, (reputed from the Chateau de Versailles), c. 1735–40
  Barometer and Pedestal, c. 1735
- Jean-Antoine Lépine – at least 1 item:
  Clock, in the form of an African Diana, the goddess of the Hunt, 1790 (The Blue Drawing Room, Buckingham Palace)
  Astronomical Clock, c. 1790 (The Blue Drawing Room, Buckingham Palace)
- Martin-Eloy Lignereux – at least 1 item:
  Clock, 1803
- Pierre-Philippe Thomire – at least 1 item:
  Clock, in the form of Apollo's chariot, c. 1805 (The State Dining Room, Buckingham Palace)
- Benjamin Vulliamy – at least 1 item:
  Clock, in the form of a bull, c. 1755–1760
- Benjamin Lewis Vulliamy – at least 1 item:
  Clock, fitted with three porcelain figures, c. 1788 (The State Dining Room, Buckingham Palace)
Decorative arts
- Matthew Boulton – at least 4 items:
  Two pairs of vases, c. late 18th century (The Marble Hall, Buckingham Palace)
- Fabergé – at least 3 Imperial Eggs and 1 Easter Egg
- Gérard-Jean Galle – at least 2 items:
  Candelabra x2, in the form of cornucopias, c. early 19th century
- François Rémond – at least 12 items:
  Candelabra x8, 4 pairs, c. 1787 (The Blue Drawing Room & The Music Room, Buckingham Palace)
  Candelabra x4, delivered to the comte d'Artois for the cabinet de Turc at Versailles, 1783 (The State Dining Room, Buckingham Palace)
- Pierre-Philippe Thomire – at least 3 items:
  Vase, c. early 19th century (The Music Room, Windsor Castle)
  Candelabra x2, malachite and bronze, early 19th century (The White Drawing Room, Buckingham Palace)
  Candelabra x2, malachite and bronze, c. 1828 (The State Dining Room, Buckingham Palace)
  Candelabra x4, figures of patinated bronze, c. 1810 (The East Gallery, Buckingham Palace)
- Kim Se-yong (ceramist) – at least 1 item: celadon openwork vase South Korean, c. 1999
- Shin Sang-ho – at least 2 items: celadon openwork vase South Korean, c. 1986
Porcelain
- Sèvres porcelain – Arguably the world's largest collection
- Chelsea porcelain – Complete service finished in 1763
Sculpture
- Antonio Canova – at least 3 items:
  Mars and Venus, c. 1815–1817 (The Ministers' Staircase, Buckingham Palace)
  Fountain nymph, 1819 (The Marble Hall, Buckingham Palace)
  Dirce, 1824 (The Marble Hall, Buckingham Palace)
- François Girardon – at least 1 item:
  Bronze equestrian statue of Louis XIV, after Girardon, c. 1700
- Louis-Claude Vassé – at least 1 item:
  Equestrian statue of Louis XV, a small reduction copy after the original by Edmé Bouchardon, c. 1764
- Antiquities – at least 2 items:
  British Bronze Age - the Rillaton Gold Cup, on long-term loan to the British Museum.
  Lely Venus, a Hellenistic statue of the "crouching Venus" type, bought by Charles I, on long-term loan to the British Museum.
Tapestries and carpets
- The Story of Abraham, set of 10, woven in Brussels in the 1540s for Henry VIII
- Gobelins – at least 36 items:
  Tapestry, four (from a series of twenty-eight designs) from the 'History of Don Quixote' given by Louis XVI to Richard Cosway, by whom presented to George IV, c. 1788
  Tapestry, eight from the series 'Les Portières des Dieux', c. 18th century
  Tapestry, four from the series 'Les Amours des Dieux', c. late 18th century
  Tapestry, eight from the series 'Jason and the Golden Fleece', 1776-1779
  Tapestry, seven from the series 'History of Esther', 1783
  Tapestry, three from the series 'Story of Daphnis and Chloë', 1754
  Tapestry, two from the series 'Story of Meleager and Atalanta', 1844

=== Costume ===
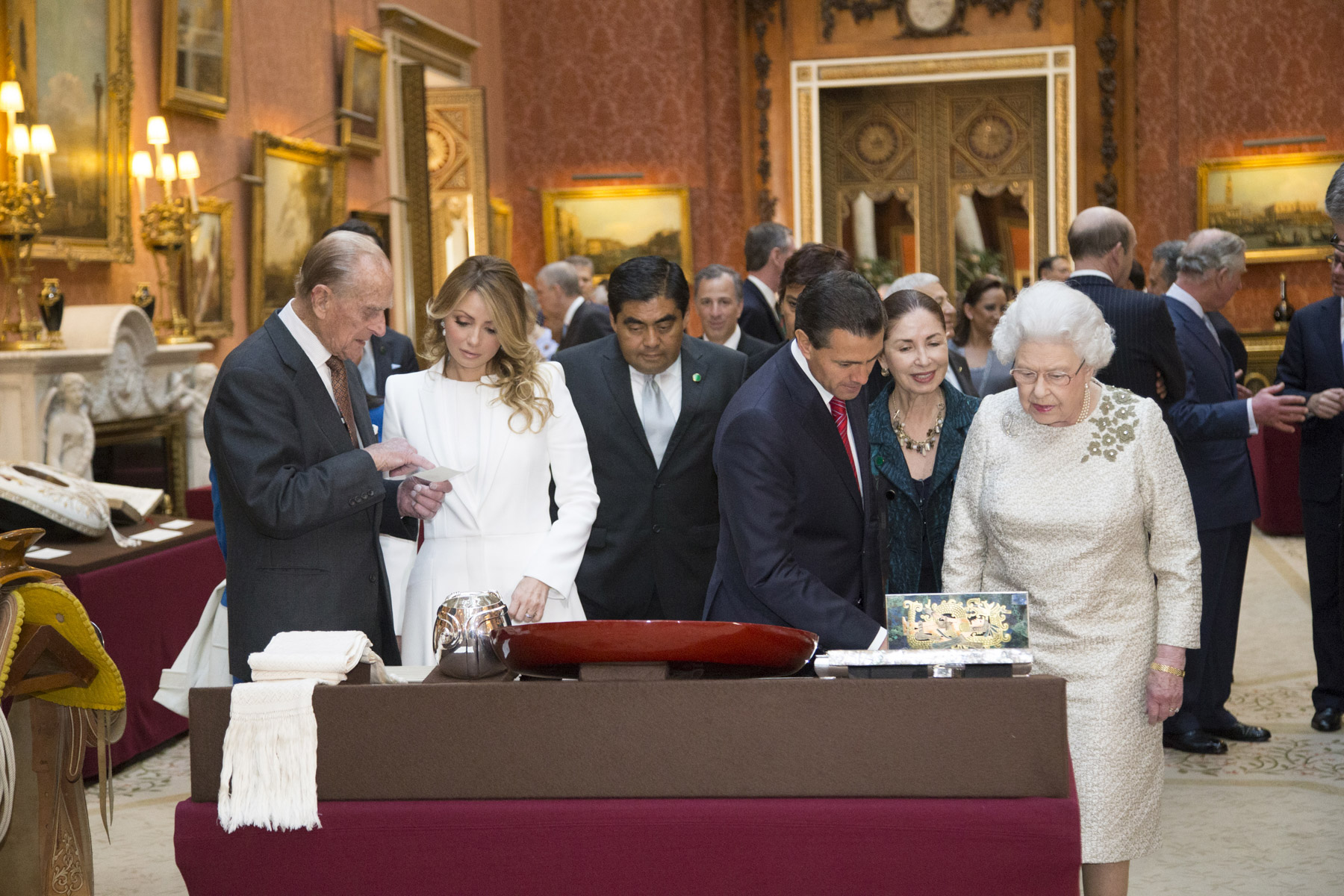
Queen Elizabeth II showing textiles and other works from the collection to the visiting President of Mexico, Enrique Peña Nieto, in 2015

The collection has a number of items of clothing, including those worn by members of the Royal family, especially female members, some going back to the early 19th century. These include ceremonial dress and several wedding dresses, including that of Queen Victoria which set the trend for white wedding dresses (1840). There are also servant's livery uniforms, and a number of exotic pieces presented over the years, going back to a "war coat" of Tipu Sultan (d. 1799). In recent years these have featured more prominently in displays and exhibitions, and are popular with the public.

=== Gems and jewels ===
A collection of 277 cameos, intaglios, badges of insignia, snuff boxes and pieces of jewellery known as the Gems and Jewels are kept at Windsor Castle. Separate from Elizabeth II's jewels and the Crown Jewels, 24 pre-date the Renaissance and the rest were made in the 16th to 19th centuries. In 1862, it was first shown publicly at the South Kensington Museum, now the Victoria and Albert Museum. Several objects were removed and others added in the second half of the Victorian period. An inventory of the collection was made in 1872, and a catalogue, Ancient and Modern Gems and Jewels in the Collection of Her Majesty The Queen, was published in 2008 by the Royal Collection Trust.

== Ownership ==
The Royal Collection is privately owned, although some of the works are displayed in areas of palaces and other royal residences open to visitors for the public to enjoy. Some of the collection is owned by the monarch personally, and everything else is described as being held in trust by the monarch in right of the Crown. It is understood that works of art acquired by monarchs up to the death of Queen Victoria in 1901 are heirlooms which fall into the latter category. Items the British royal family acquired later, including official gifts, can be added to that part of the collection by a monarch at their sole discretion. Ambiguity surrounds the status of objects that came into the possession of Elizabeth II during her 70-year reign. The Royal Collection Trust has confirmed that all pieces left to her by Queen Elizabeth The Queen Mother, which included works by Monet, Nash, and Fabergé, belonged to her personally. It was also confirmed that she owned the royal stamp collection, inherited from her father George VI, as a private individual.

Non-personal items are said to be inalienable as they can be willed to only the monarch's successor. The legal accuracy of this claim has never been substantiated in court. According to Cameron Cobbold, then Lord Chamberlain, speaking in 1971, minor items have occasionally been sold to help raise money for acquisitions, and duplicates of items are given away as presents within the Commonwealth. In 1995, Iain Sproat, then Secretary of State for National Heritage, told the House of Commons that selling objects was "entirely a matter for the Queen". In a 2000 television interview, the Duke of Edinburgh said that the monarch was "technically, perfectly at liberty to sell them".

Hypothetical questions have been asked in Parliament about what should happen to the collection if the UK ever becomes a republic. In other European countries, the art collections of deposed monarchies usually have been taken into state ownership or become part of other national collections held in trust for the public's enjoyment. Under the European Convention on Human Rights, incorporated into British law in 1998, the monarch may have to be compensated for the loss of any assets held in right of the Crown unless he or she agreed to surrender them voluntarily.

== Management ==
Logo of the Royal Collection Trust

A registered charity, the Royal Collection Trust was set up in 1993 after the Windsor Castle fire with a mandate to conserve the works and enhance the public's appreciation and understanding of art. It employs around 500 staff and is one of the five departments of the Royal Household. Buildings do not come under its remit. In 2012, the team of curatorial staff numbered 29, and there were 32 conservationists. Income is raised by charging entrance fees to see the collection at various locations and selling books and merchandise to the public. The Trust is financially independent and receives no Government funding or public subsidy. A studio at Marlborough House is responsible for the conservation of furniture and decorative objects.

Owing to the COVID-19 pandemic, the Trust lost £64 million during 2020 and announced 130 redundancies, including the roles of Surveyor of the Queen's Pictures and Surveyor of the Queen's Works of Art. The two posts were reinstated in December 2023.

The Royal Collection Trust is a company limited by guarantee, registered in England and Wales, and a Registered Charity. On its website, the Trust describes its purpose as overseeing the "maintenance and conservation of the Royal Collection, subject to proper custodial control in the service of the King and the nation". It also deals with acquisitions for the Royal Collection, and the display of the Royal Collection to the public.

=== Board of trustees ===
The Board of Trustees includes the following officers of the Royal Household: the Lord Chamberlain, the Private Secretary to the Sovereign and the Keeper of the Privy Purse. Other Trustees are appointed for their knowledge and expertise in areas relevant to the charity's activities. Currently, the trustees are:

- James Leigh-Pemberton (Chairman)
- Marc Bolland (Deputy Chairman)
- Brian Ivory
- Tony Johnstone-Burt
- Anna Keay
- Tonya Nelson
- Monisha Shah
- Andrew Parker, Baron Parker of Minsmere (Lord Chamberlain)
- Michael Stevens (Keeper of the Privy Purse)
- Clive Alderton (Private Secretary to the Sovereign)

=== Management Board ===
The Management Board is the committee responsible for the day-to-day running of the Royal Collection. It is appointed by the Board of Trustees.

It consists of:

- Tim Knox (Director of the Royal Collection)
- Keith Harrison (Finance Director)
- Michelle Lockhart (Commercial Director)

=== Operations Board ===
The Operations Board represents all areas of the Royal Collection Trust and focuses on high-level, operational issues and the delivery of Royal Collection Trust's strategy.

It consists of:

- Caroline de Guitaut, LVO, FSA (Surveyor of The King's Works of Art)
- Anna Reynolds, MVO (Surveyor of The King's Pictures)
- Stella Panayotova (Librarian and Assistant Keeper of The Royal Archives)
- Gwen Hamilton (Superintendent and Head of Visitor Operations – Palace of Holyroodhouse)
- Simon Maples (Head of Visitor Operations – London and Windsor)
- Kaneesha Bose (Head of Central Retail)
- Olivia Clear (Senior People Partner)

== Examples of the collection ==
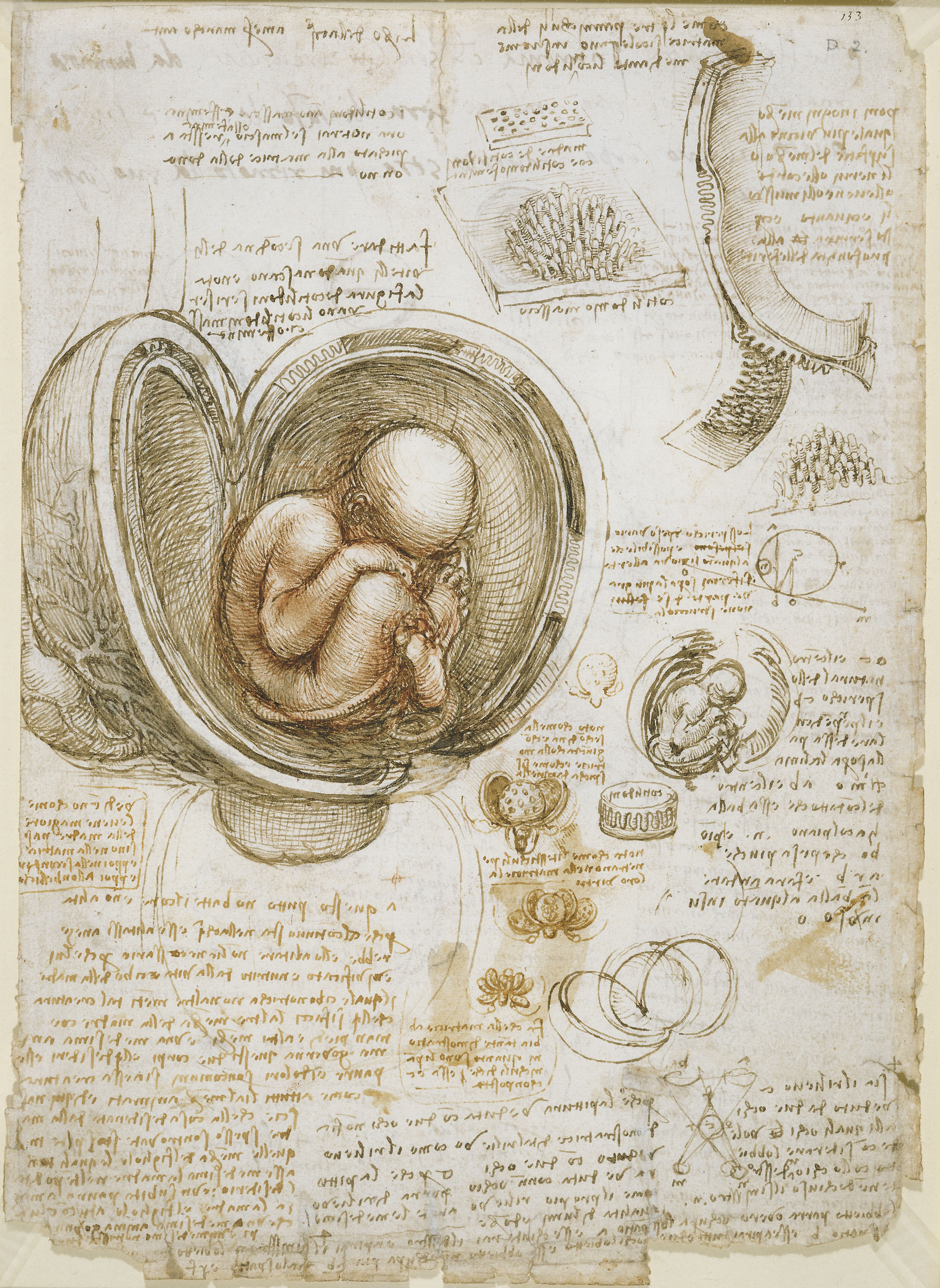
Leonardo da Vinci, Studies of the Fetus in the Womb, 1511

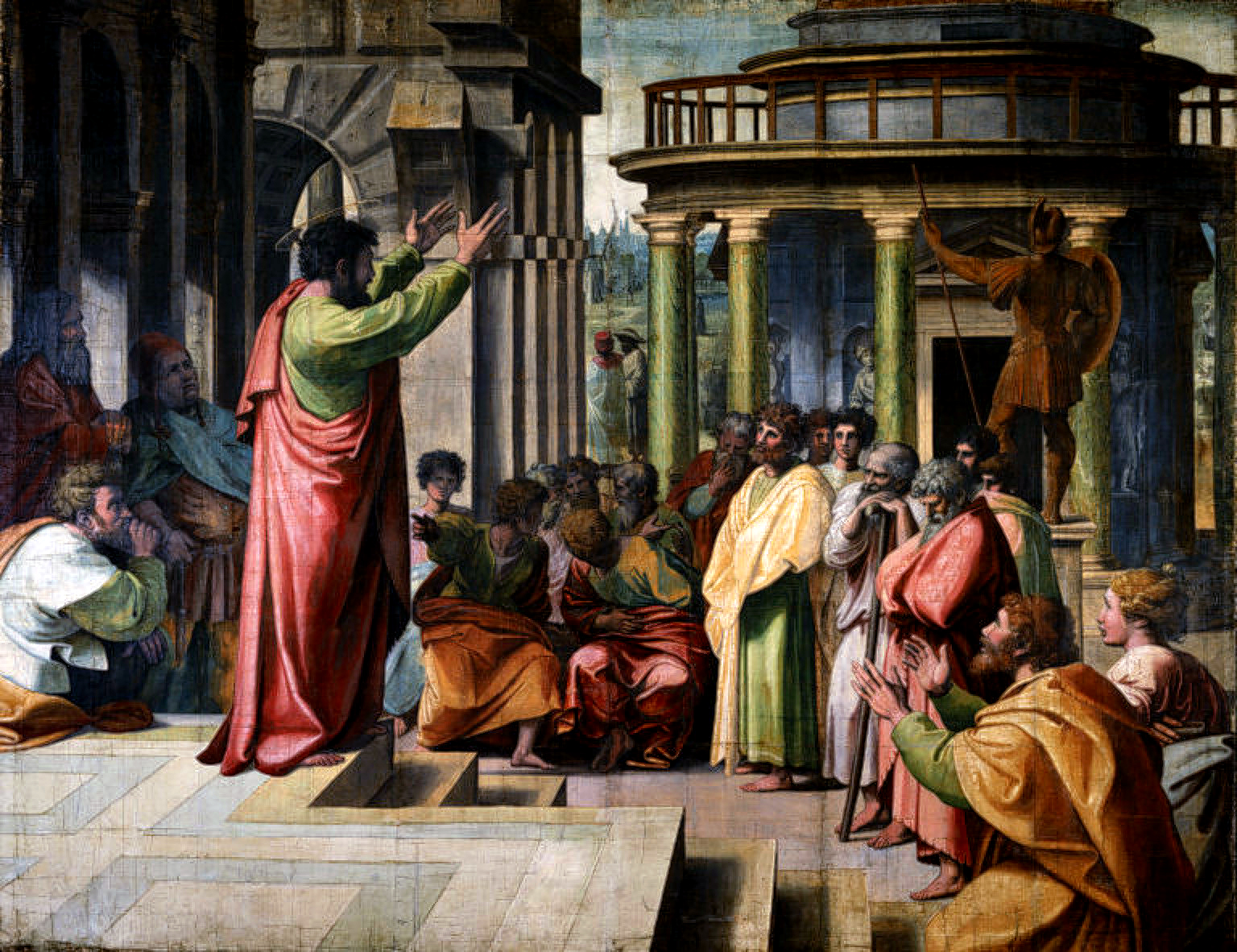
Raphael, Saint Paul Preaching in Athens, 1516 (on loan to the V&A)

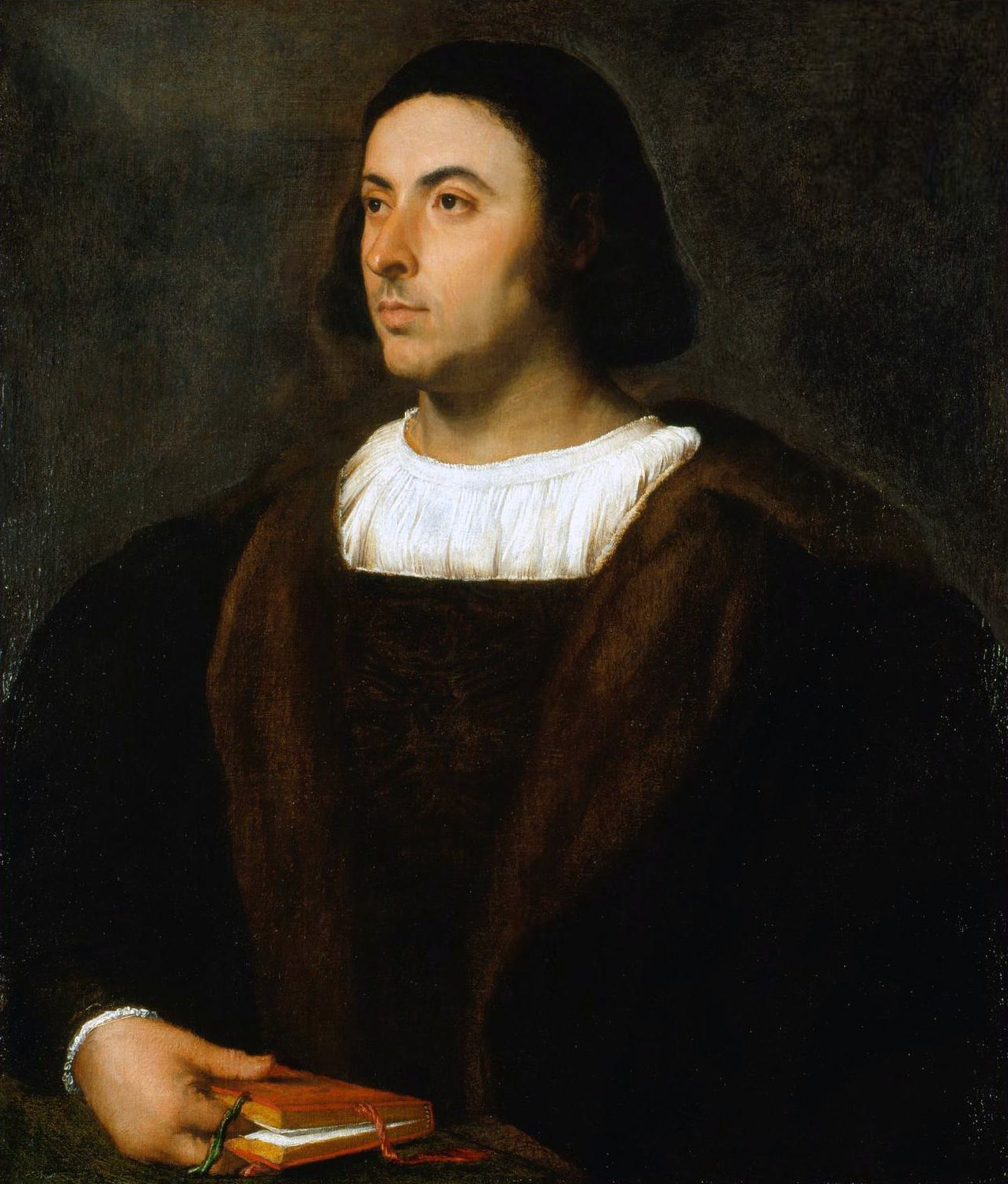
Titian, Portrait of Jacopo Sannazaro, 1514–18

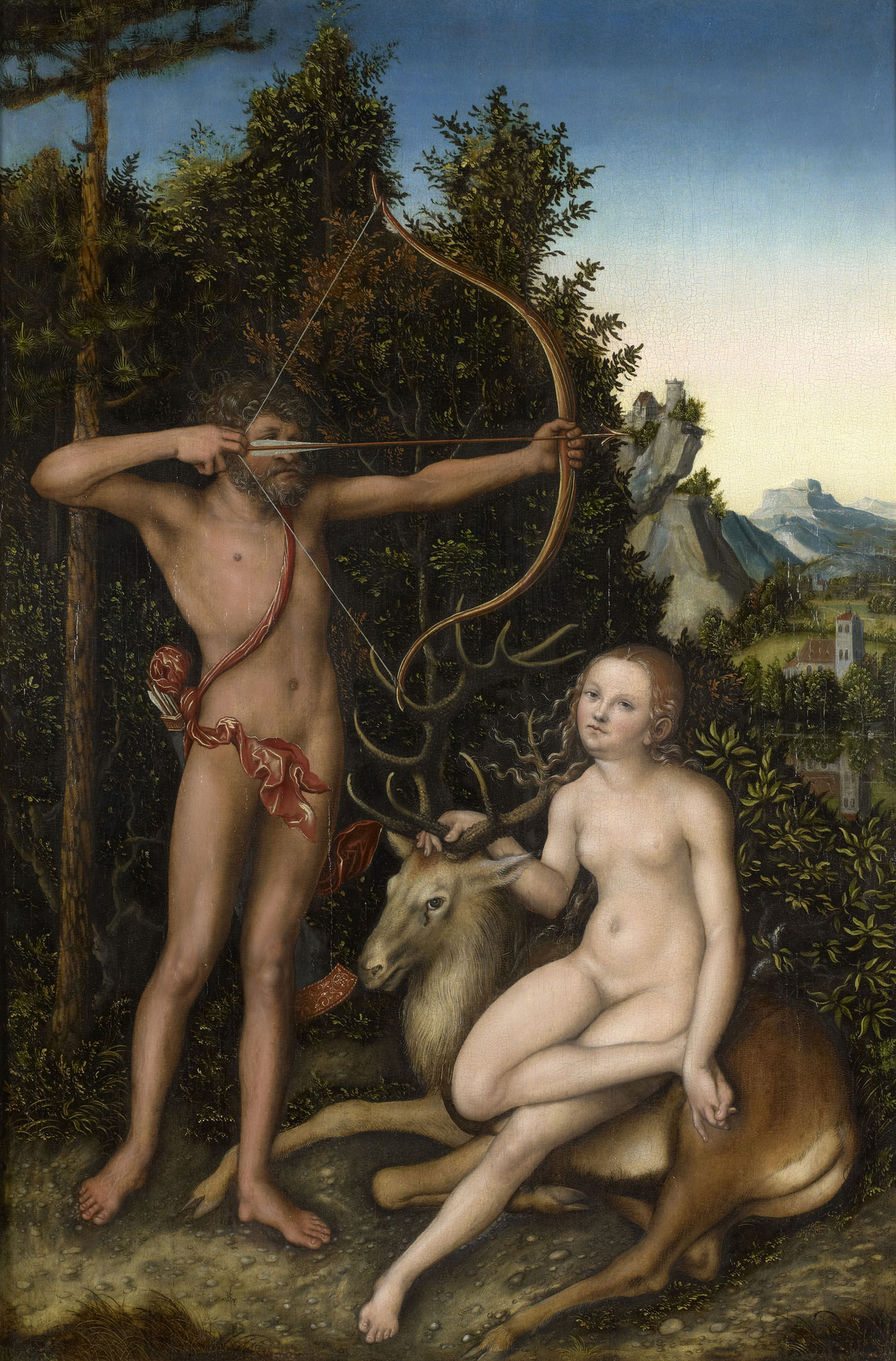
Lucas Cranach the Elder, Apollo and Diana, c. 1526

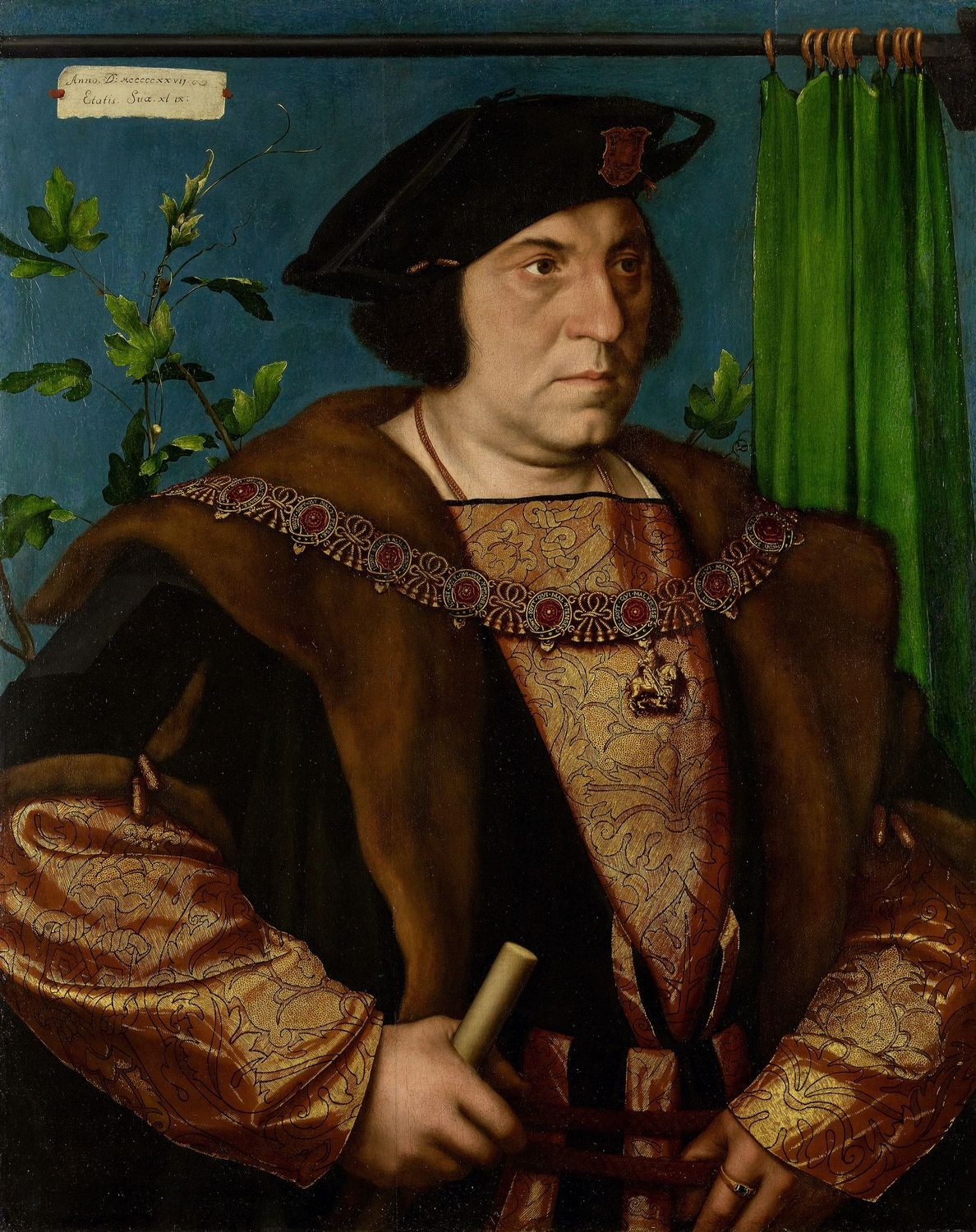
Hans Holbein the Younger, Portrait of Sir Henry Guildford, 1527

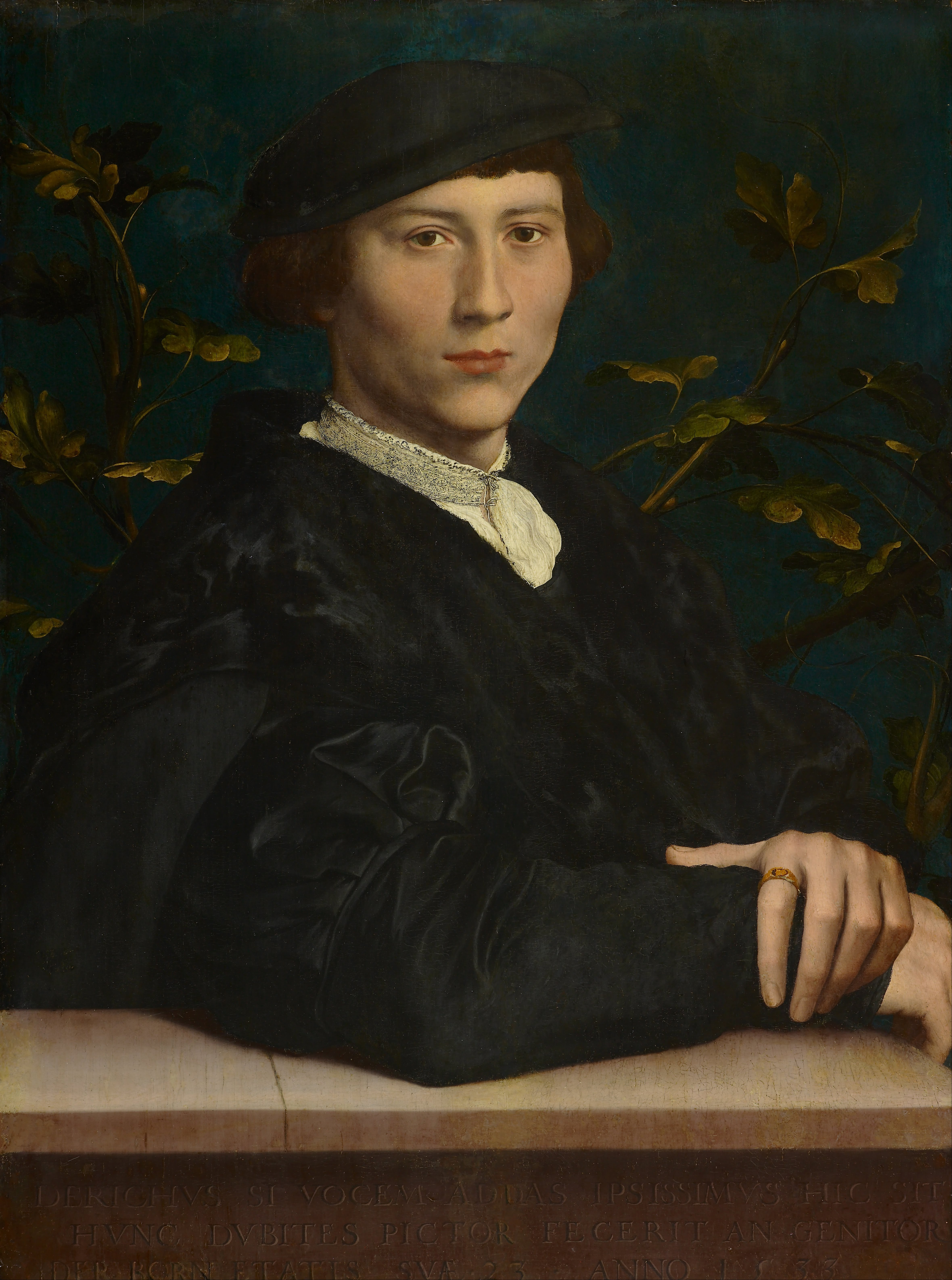
Hans Holbein the Younger, Portrait of Derich Born, 1533

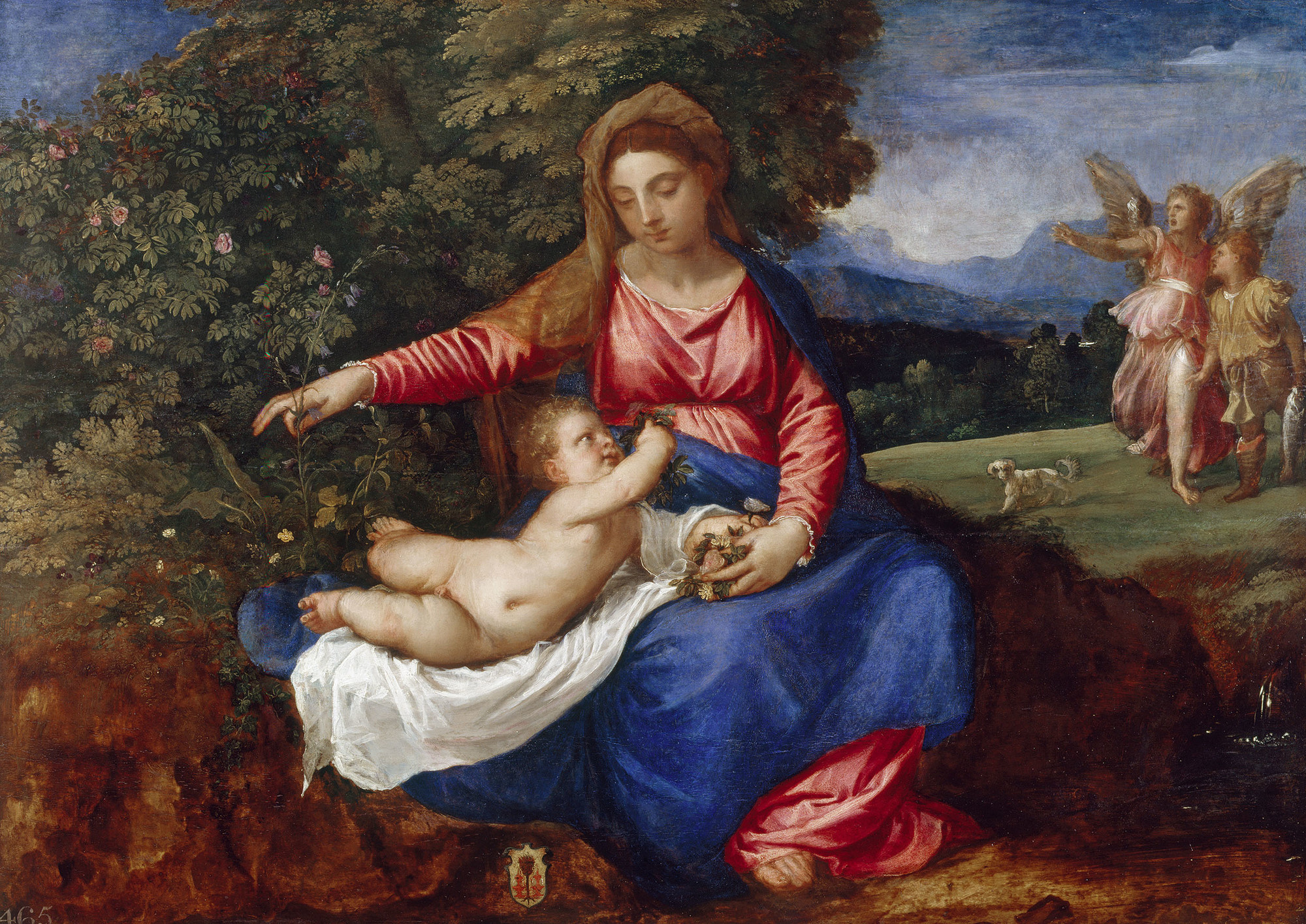
Titian, Madonna and Child in a Landscape with Tobias and the Angel, 1535–1540

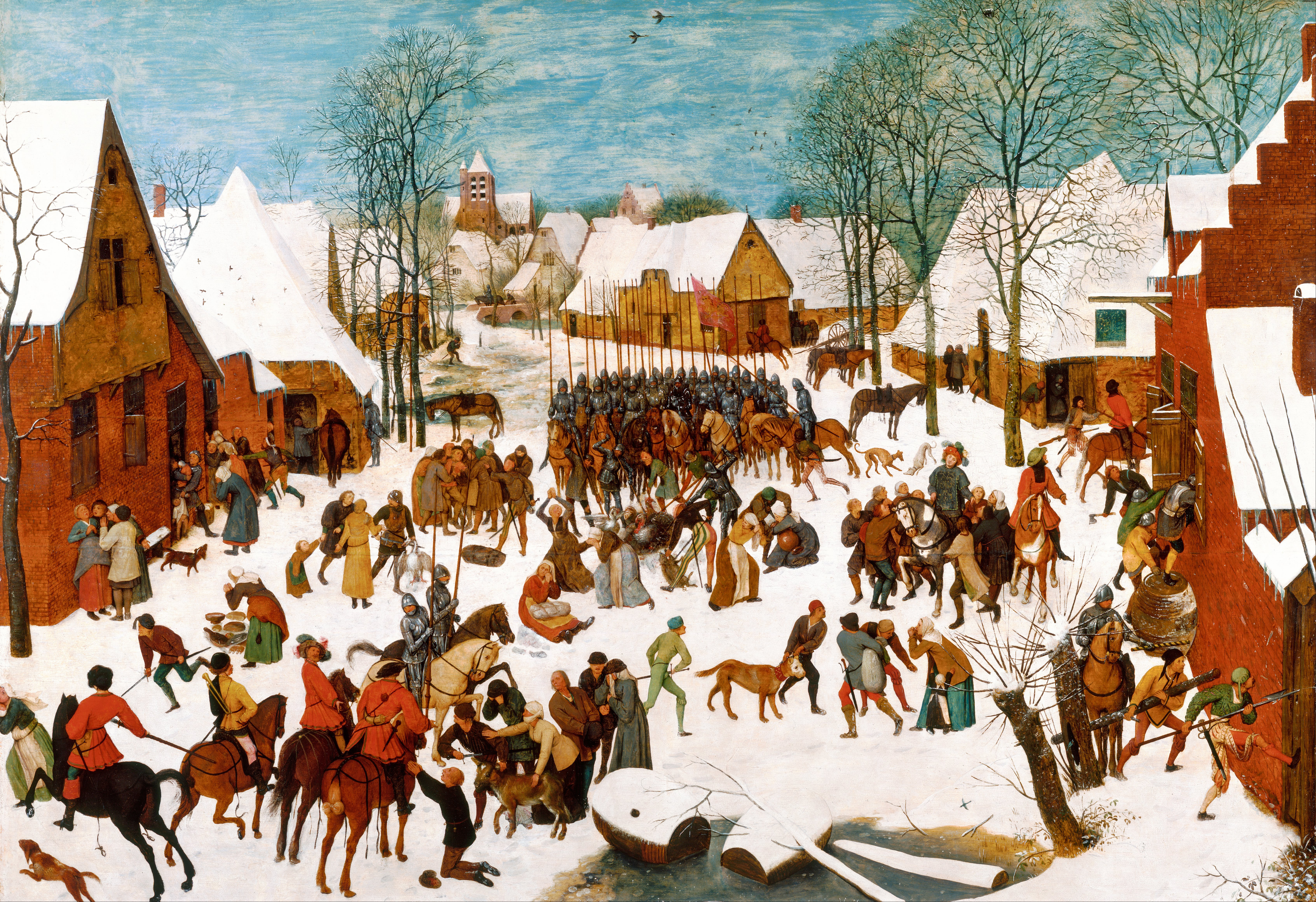
Pieter Bruegel the Elder, Massacre of the Innocents, 1565–1567

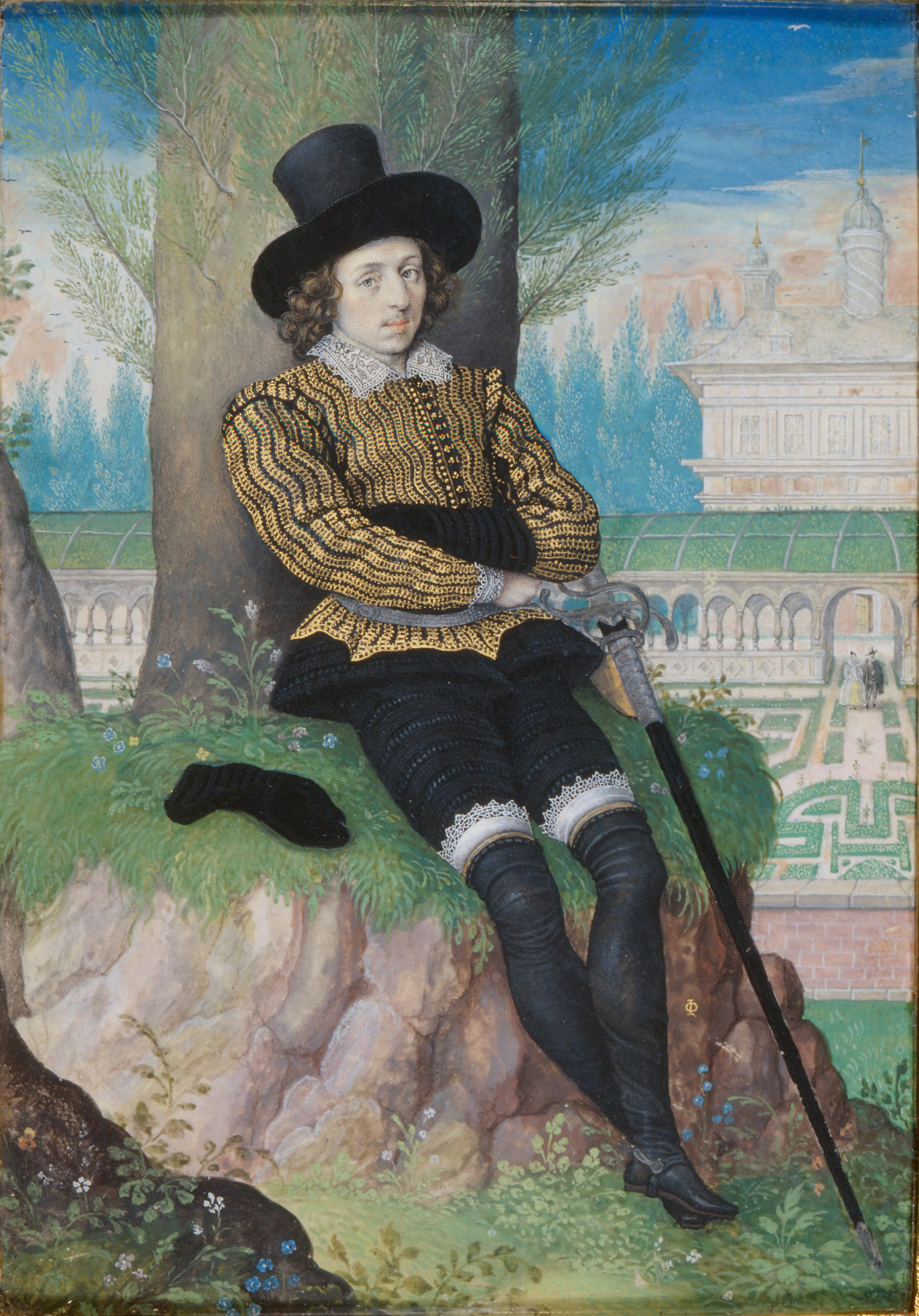
Isaac Oliver, Young Man Seated under a Tree (portrait miniature), c. 1590–1596

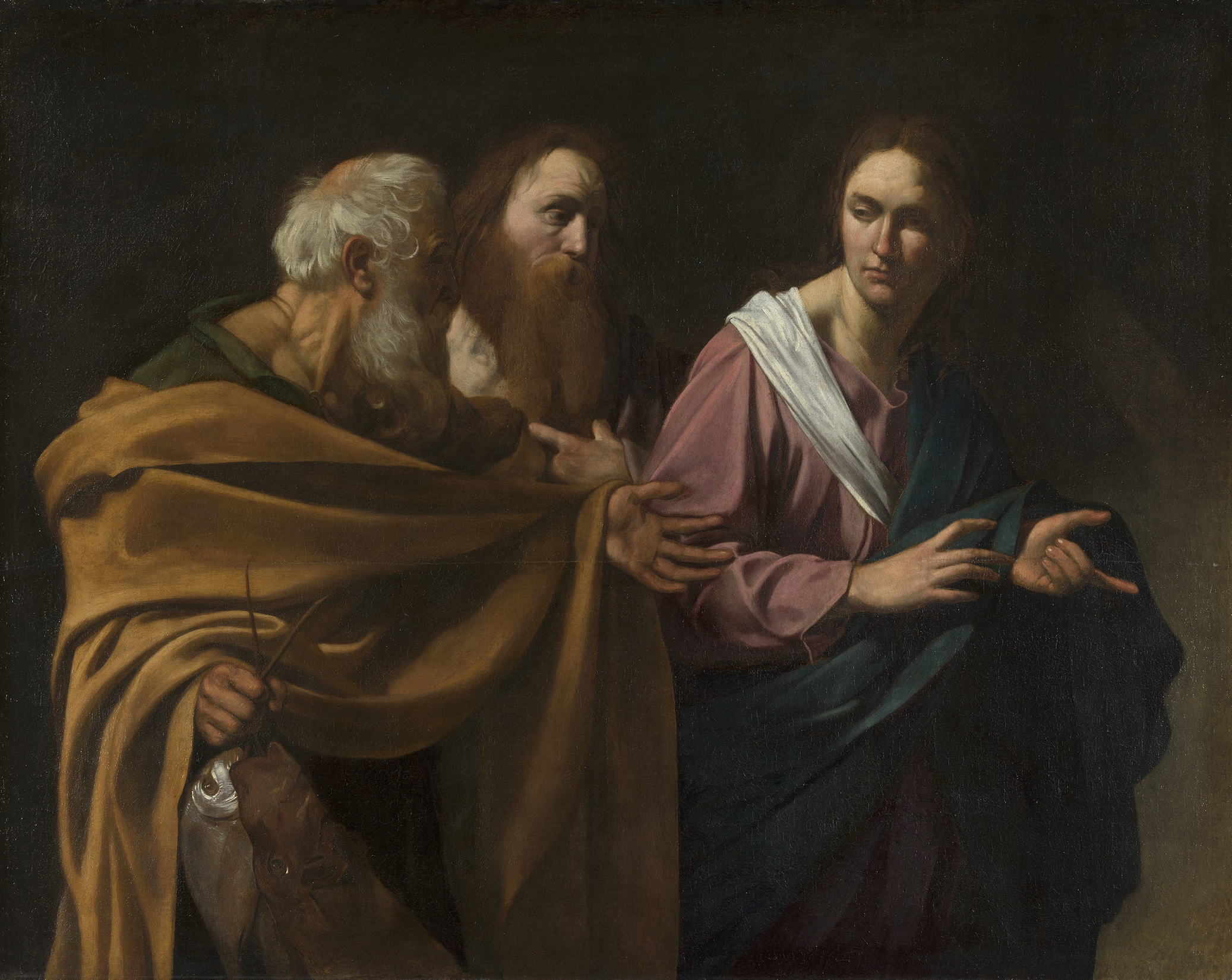
Caravaggio, The Calling of Saints Peter and Andrew, c. 1602–1604

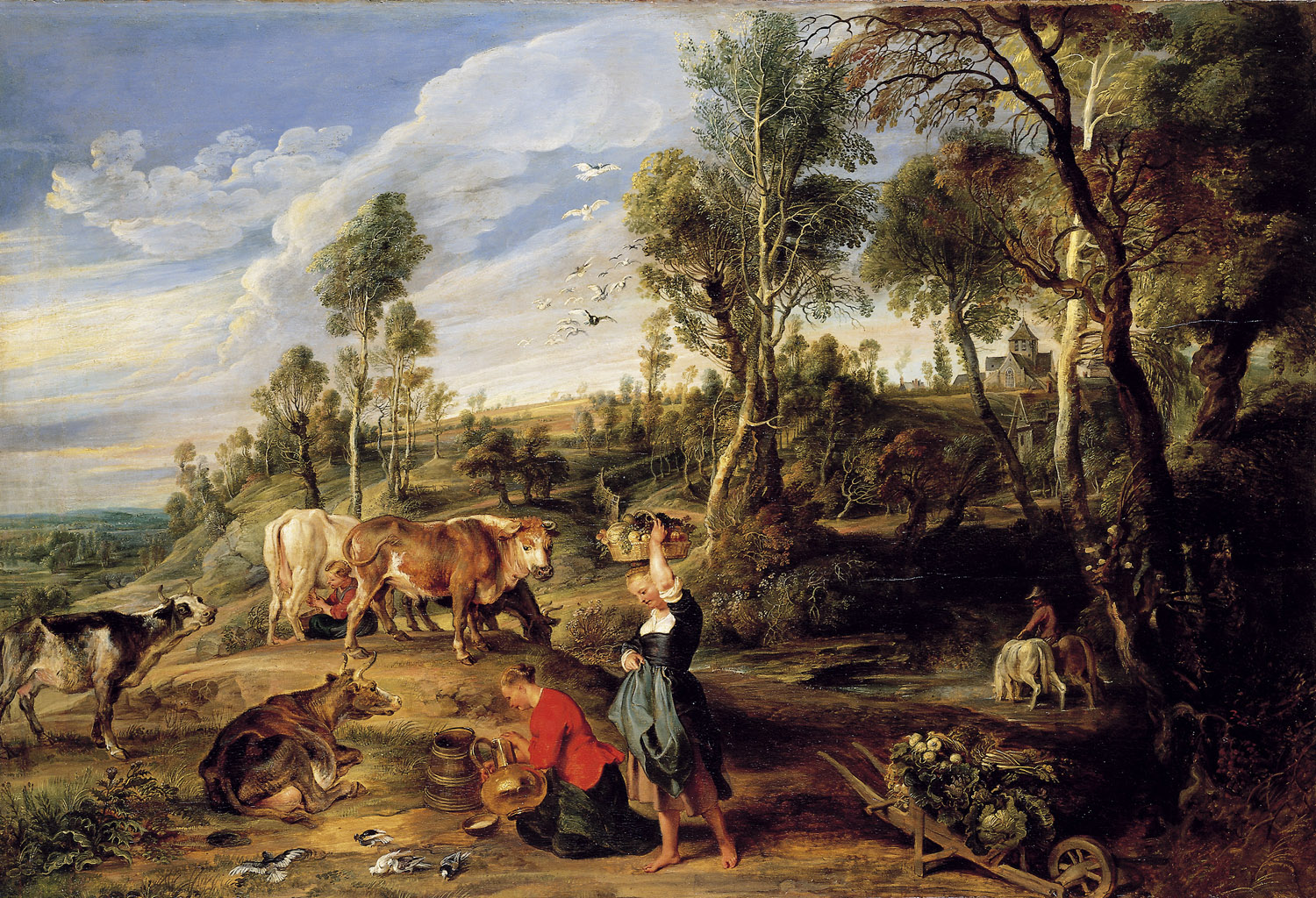
Peter Paul Rubens, Milkmaids with cattle in a landscape, 'The Farm at Laken', c. 1617–1618

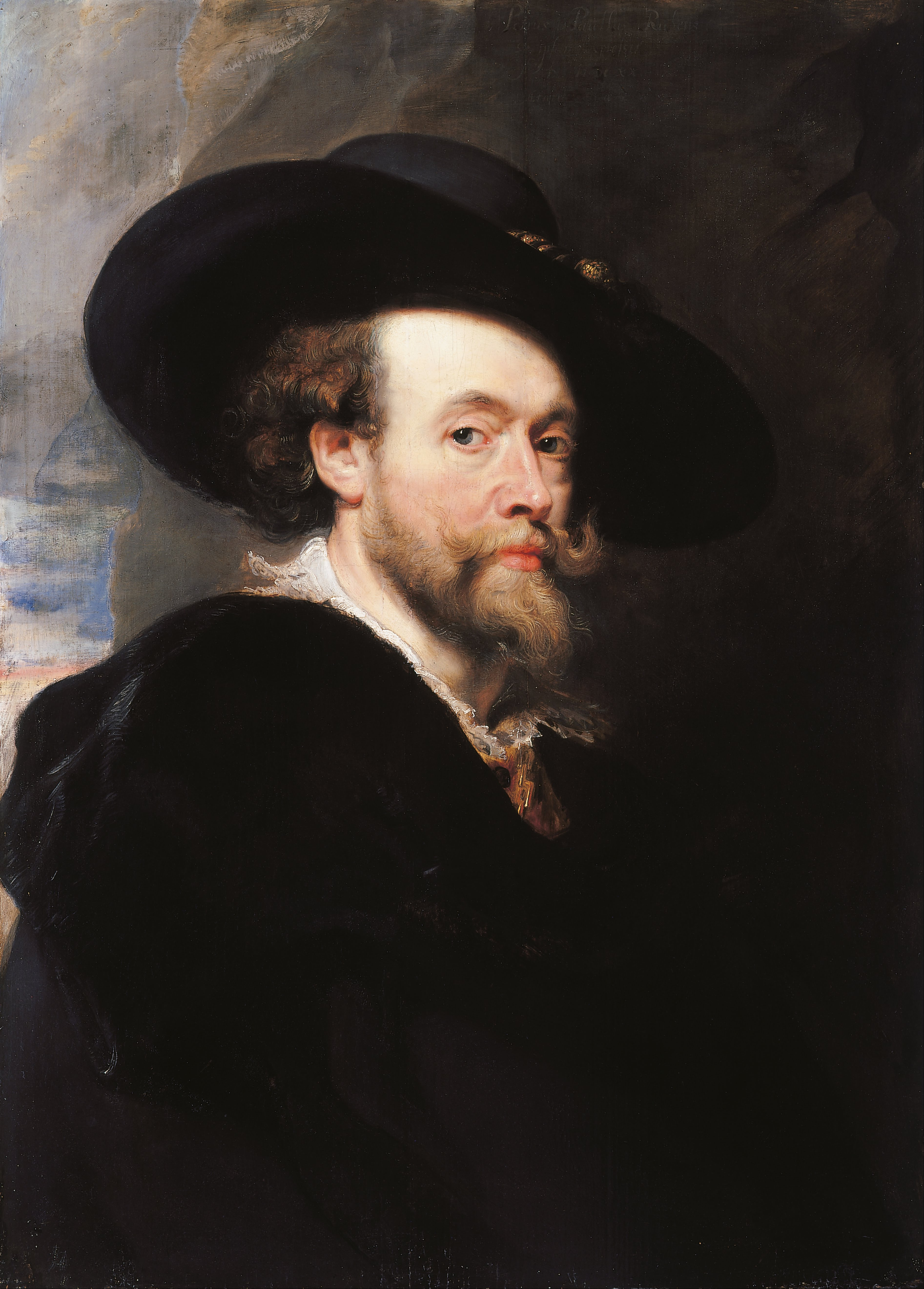
Peter Paul Rubens, Self-Portrait, 1623

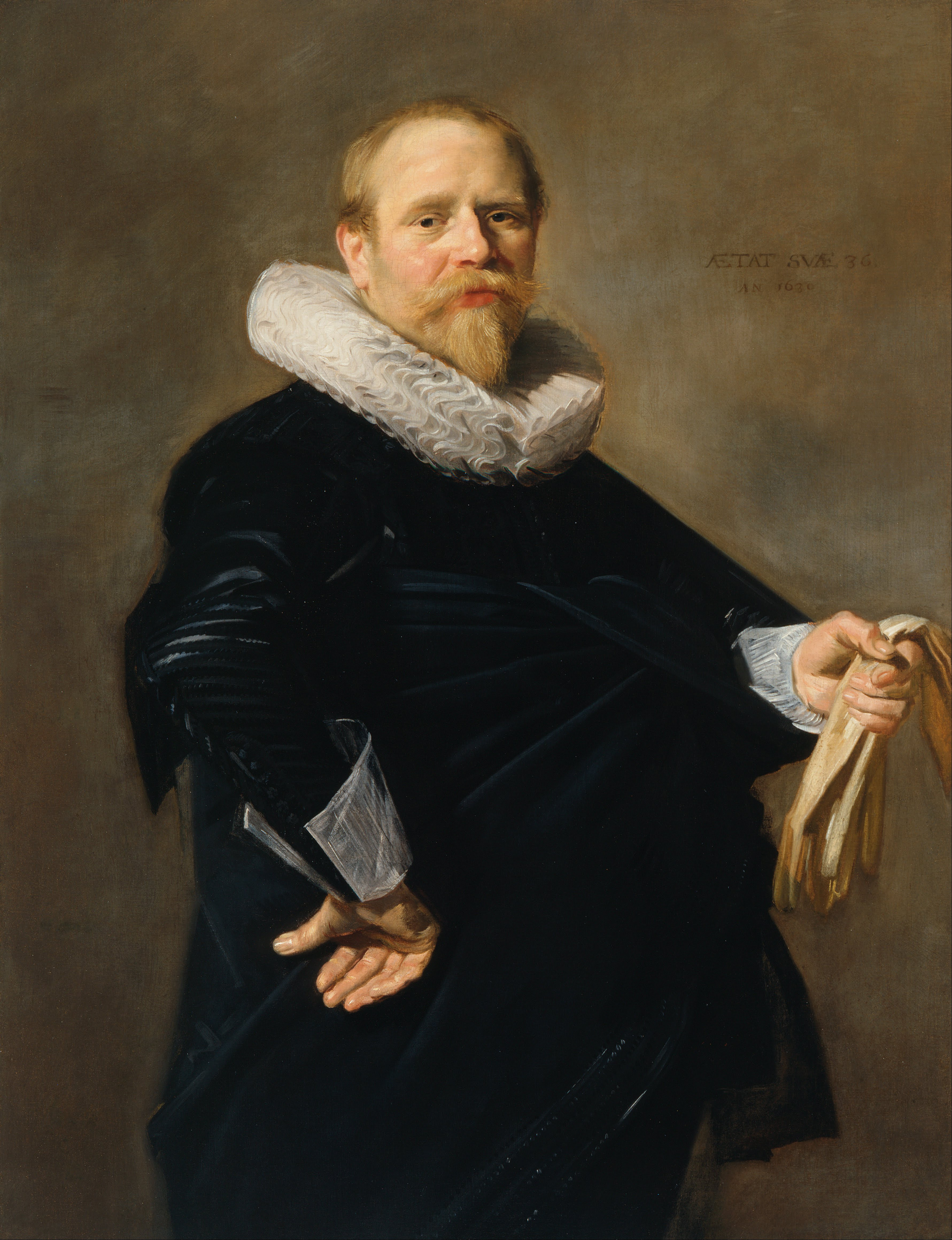
Frans Hals, Portrait of a Man, 1630

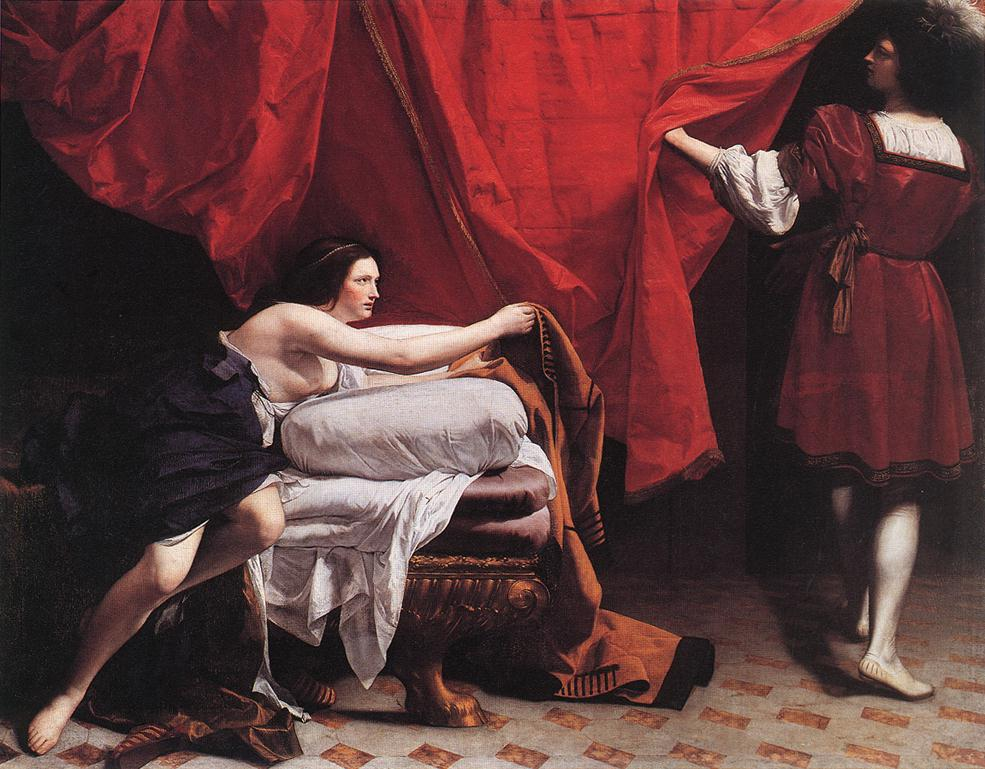
Orazio Gentileschi, Joseph and Potiphar's Wife, c. 1630–1632

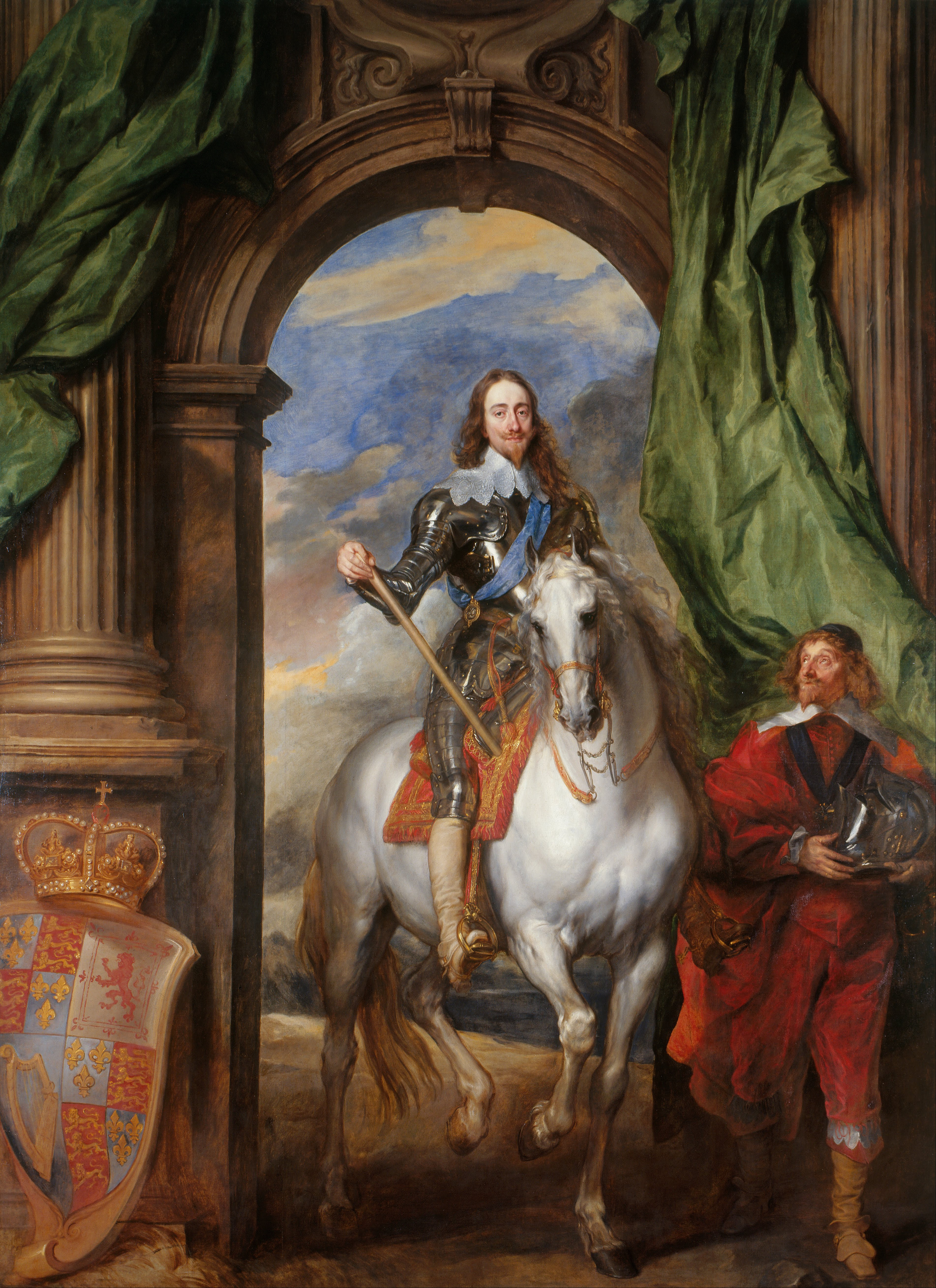
Anthony van Dyck, Charles I with M. de St Antoine, 1633

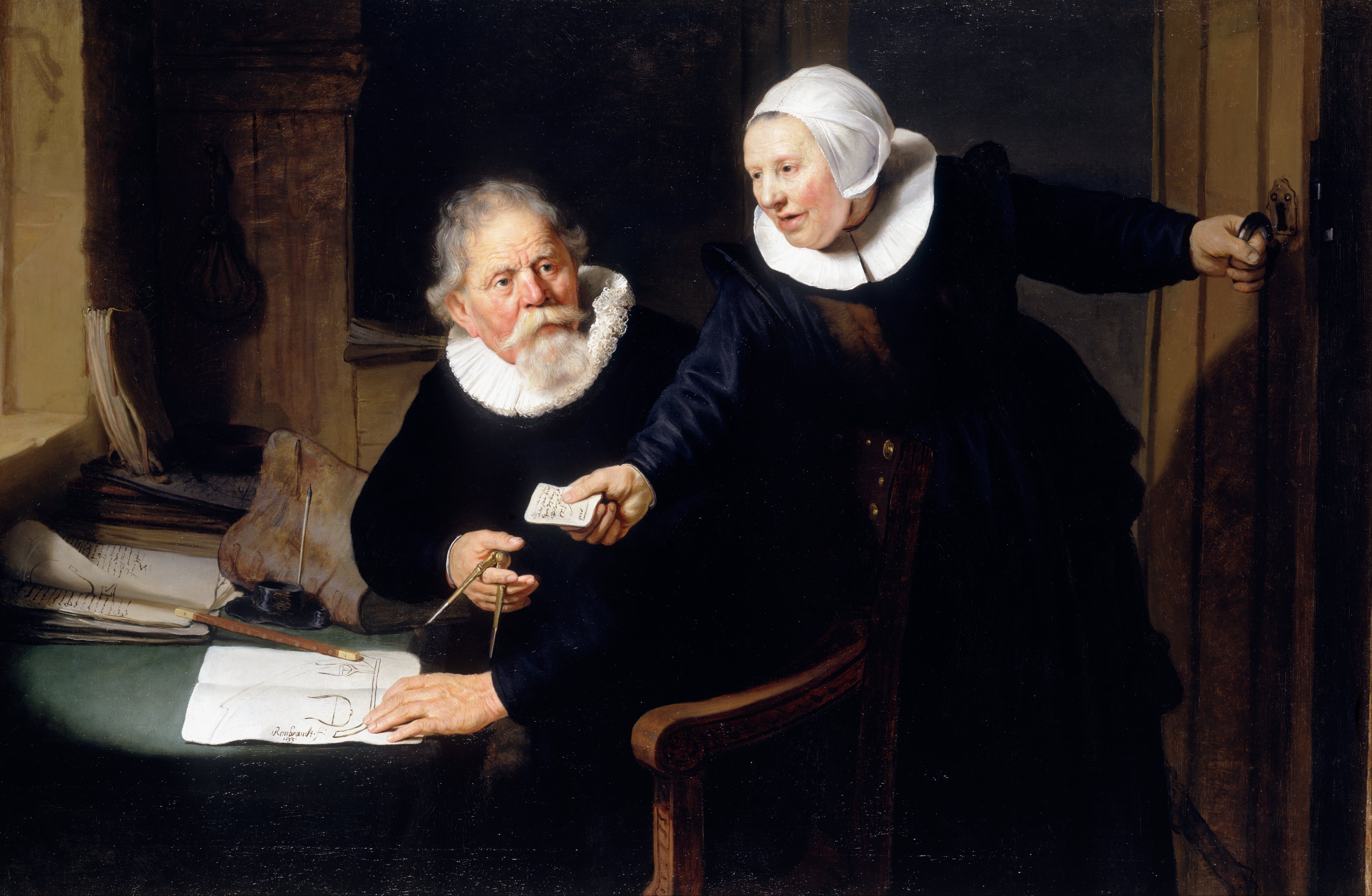
Rembrandt, The Shipbuilder and his Wife, 1633 (Jan Rijcksen (1560/2–1637) and his wife, Griet Jans)

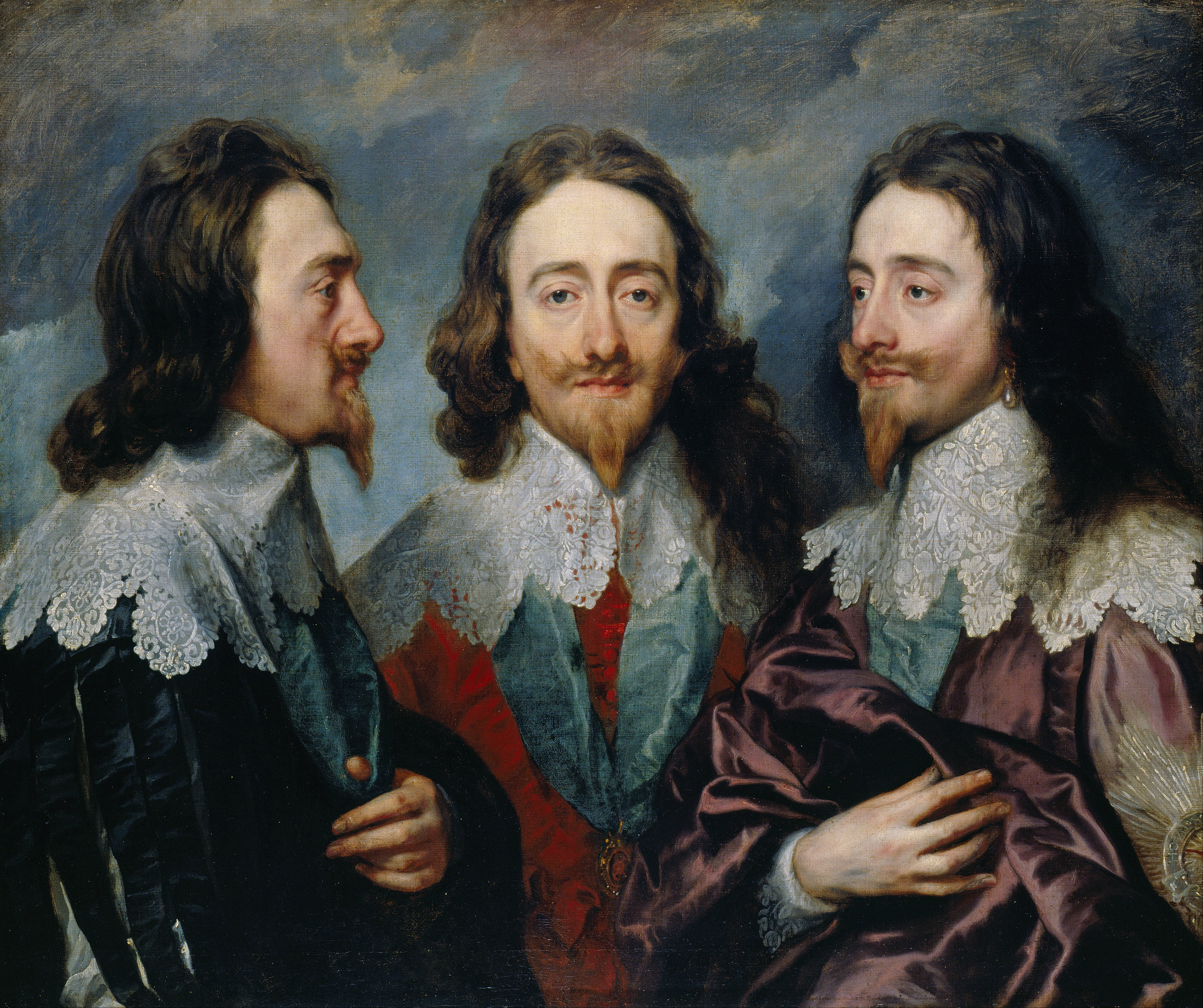
Anthony van Dyck, Charles I in Three Positions, c. 1635–1636

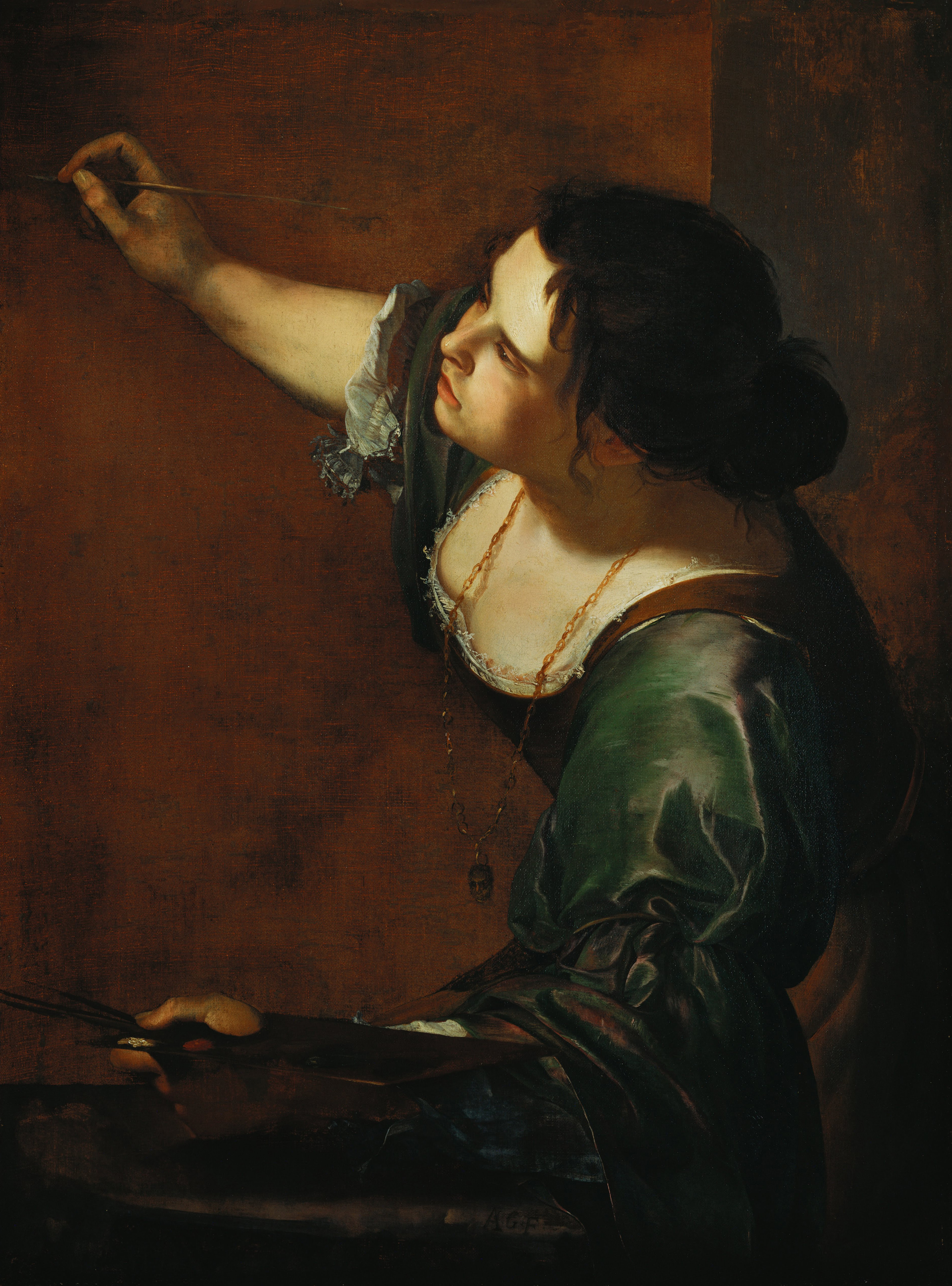
Artemisia Gentileschi, Self-Portrait as the Allegory of Painting, c. 1638–1639

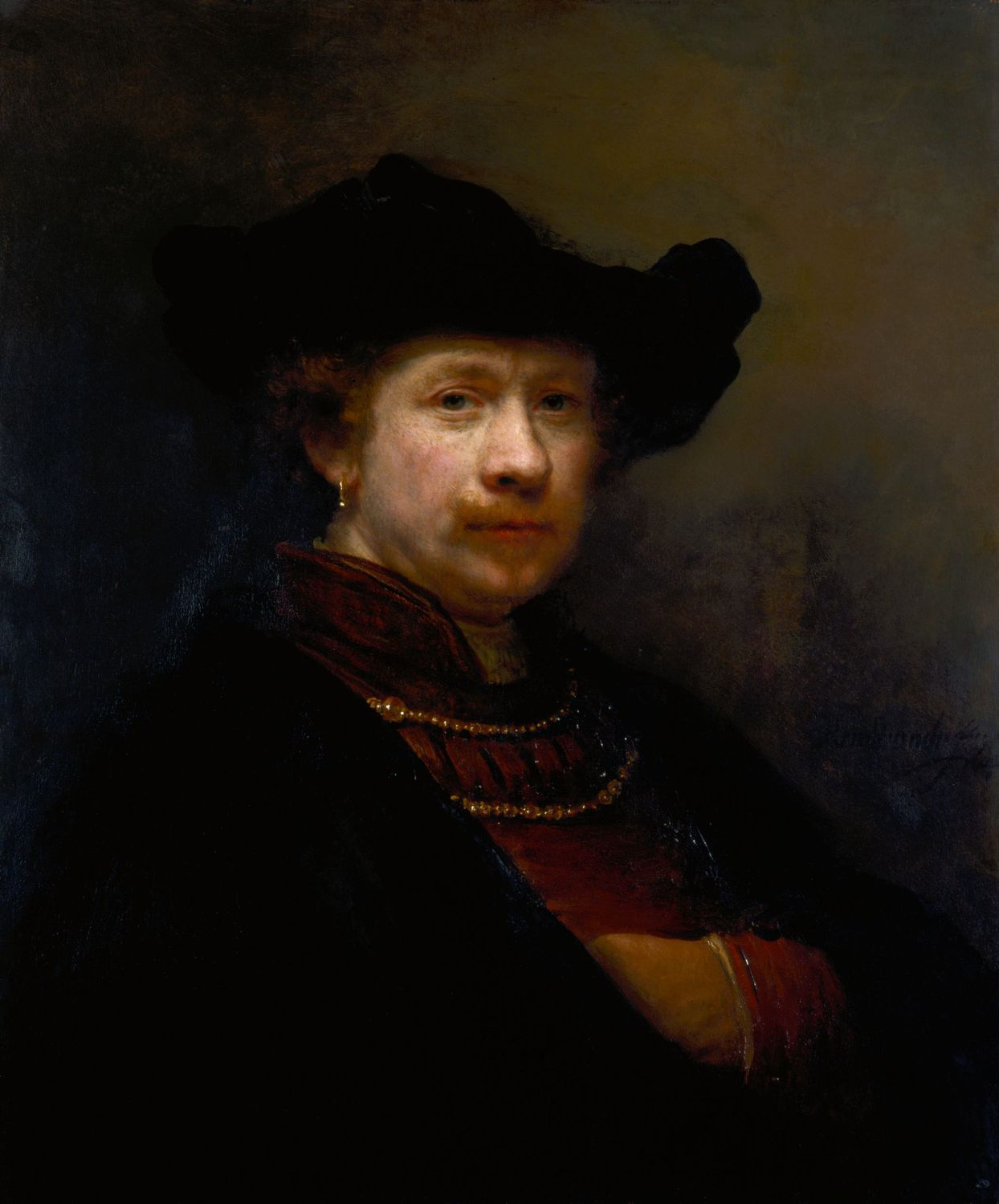
Rembrandt, Self-Portrait in a Flat Cap, 1642

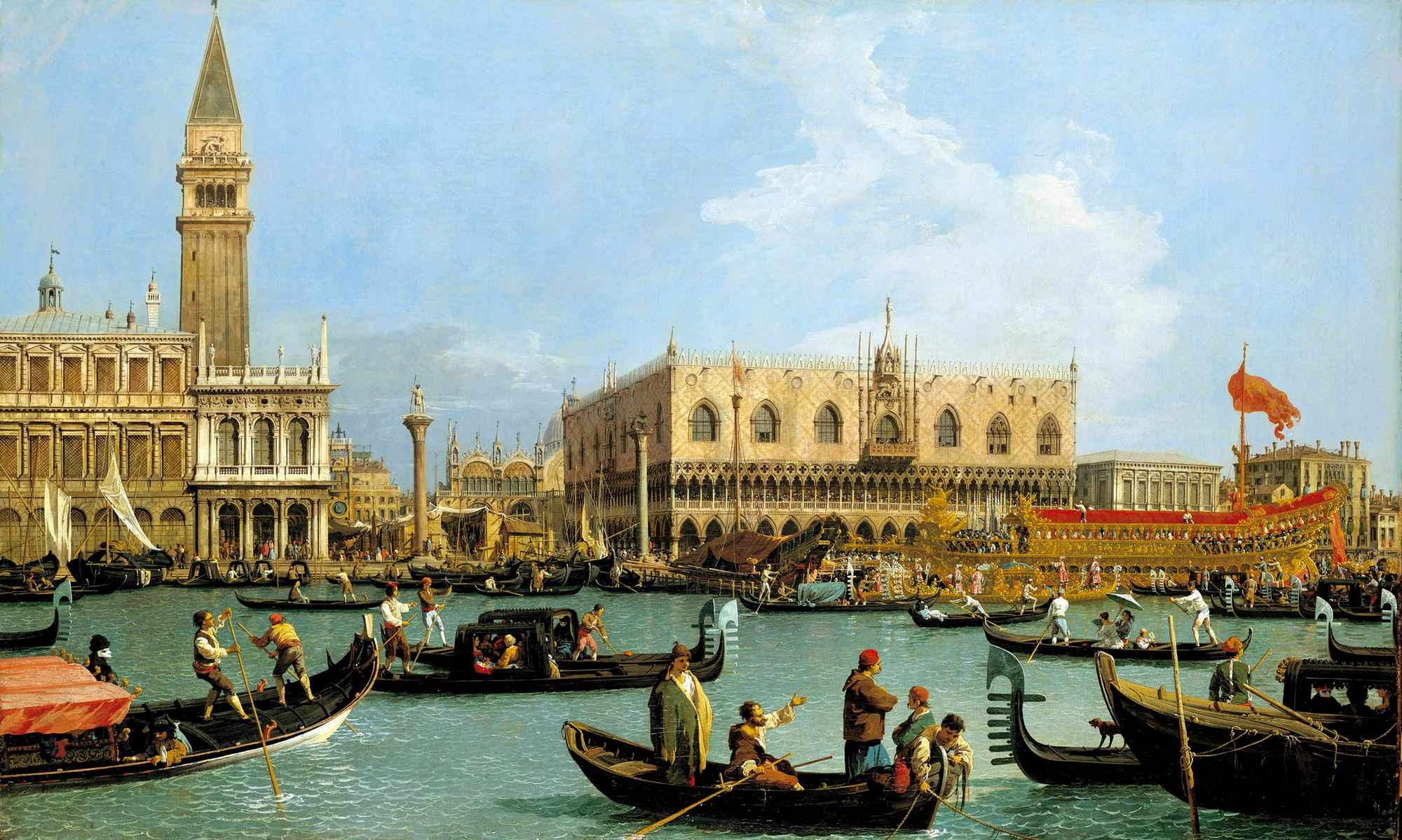
Canaletto, The Bacino di San Marco on Ascension Day, c. 1733–1734

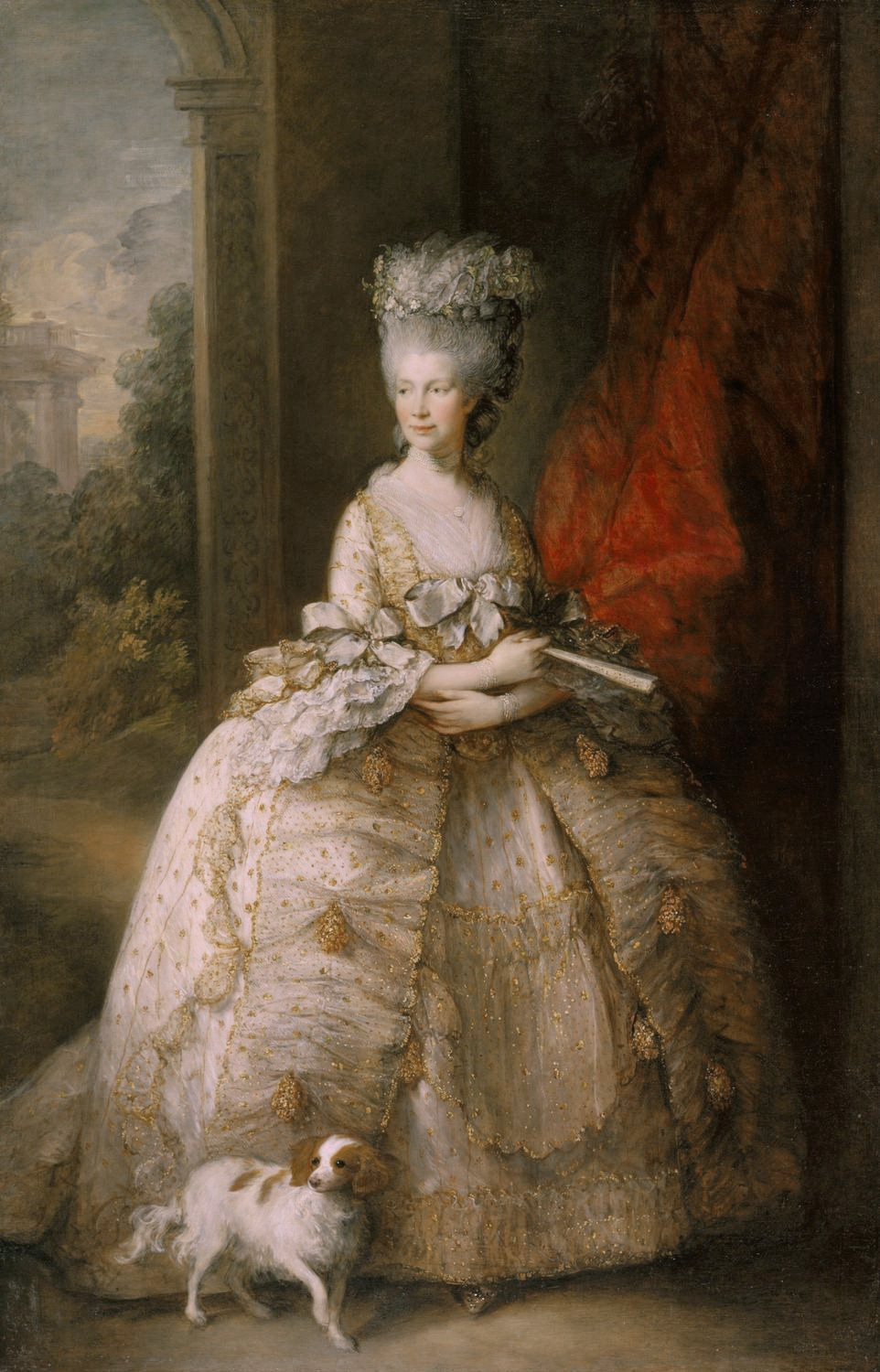
Thomas Gainsborough, Queen Charlotte, 1781

== See also ==
- Arts Council Collection
- Crown Collection
- Government Art Collection
- Parliamentary Art Collection
- Portland Collection
- Royal Armouries
- Royal Philatelic Collection
- Wallace Collection

== Bibliography ==
- Cahill, Kevin (2001). Who owns Britain. Canongate. ISBN 978-0-86241-912-7.
- Clayton, Martin; Whitaker, Lucy (2007). The Art of Italy in the Royal Collection: Renaissance & Baroque. Royal Collection Trust. ISBN 978-1-902163-29-1.
- Hall, Michael (2017). Art, Passion & Power: The Story of the Royal Collection. BBC Books. ISBN 978-1-785-94261-7.
- Hardman, Robert (2011). Our Queen. Random House. ISBN 978-1-4070-8808-2.
- Jackson, D. Michael (2018). The Canadian Kingdom: 150 Years of Constitutional Monarchy. Dundurn. ISBN 978-1-4597-4119-5.
- Lloyd, Christopher (1991), The Queen's Pictures, Royal Collectors through the centuries, National Gallery Publications, ISBN 0947645896.
- Lloyd, Christopher (1999). The Paintings in the Royal Collection: A Thematic Exploration. Royal Collection Enterprises. ISBN 978-1-902163-59-8.
- McClure, David (2015). Royal Legacy. Thistle. ISBN 978-1910198650.
- Morton, Andrew (1989). Theirs Is the Kingdom: The Wealth of the Windsors. Michael O'Mara Books. ISBN 978-0-948397-23-3.
- Paxman, Jeremy (2007). On Royalty. Penguin Adult. ISBN 978-0-14-101222-3.
- Piacenti, Kirsten Aschengreen; Boardman, John (2008). Ancient and Modern Gems and Jewels in the Collection of Her Majesty The Queen (PDF). Royal Collection Trust. ISBN 978-1-902163-47-5.
- Roberts, Jane, ed. (2002). Royal Treasures: A Golden Jubilee Celebration. Royal Collection Trust. ISBN 978-1-9021-6349-9.
