= Charles H. Cecil Studios =

Workshop in Florence, Italy

Coordinates: 43.770666°N 11.241027°E

"Painting from life" at Charles H. Cecil Studios

The Charles H. Cecil Studios is a private atelier in Florence, Italy. It is run by American painter and art historian Charles H. Cecil, who was trained by R. H. Ives Gammell. It offers training in classical techniques of drawing and oil painting. Charles H. Cecil Studios occupies the most historic Florentine atelier still in active use.

The curriculum stems directly from the leading ateliers of nineteenth-century Paris. Fundamental to the teaching is the practice of drawing and painting from life. Another important practice is the sight-size technique whereby subject and image are depicted to scale as seen from a given distance.

The studio accepts only a limited number of pupils each year. Cecil personally supervises the progress of their work and is assisted by advanced students and colleagues who return at regular intervals. Former students include Emily Roberts and Sahara Longe.
