= Self-Portrait (Rubens, London) =

1623 painting by Peter Paul Rubens

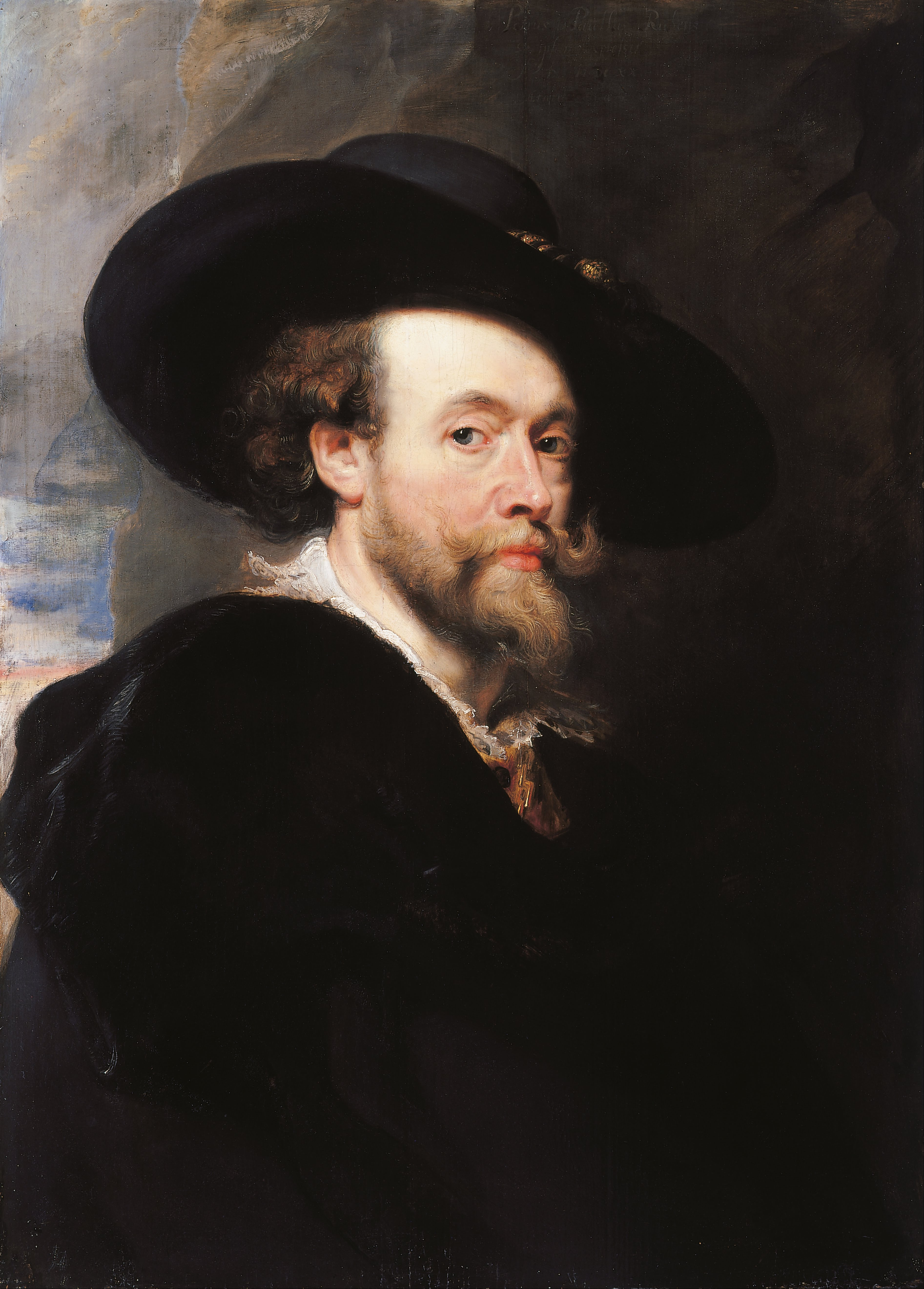
Self-Portrait (1623) by Rubens

Self-Portrait is a 1623 self-portrait in oils on canvas by Peter Paul Rubens, signed and dated by the artist. He produced it to send to the Prince of Wales (the future Charles I, King of England, Scots, and Ireland) and it is still in the Royal Collection. In 2016 it was included in an exhibition on reuniting Charles I's art collection at the Royal Academy of Arts in London, it shows the artist wearing a hat.

== Sources ==
- Bruegel to Rubens: Masters of Flemish Painting, London, 2007
- Portrait of the Artist, London, 2016
- https://www.royalcollection.org.uk/collection/400156/a-self-portrait
