= Sahara Longe =

British artist

- Born: 1994 (age 31–32); London, England
- Education: Charles H. Cecil Studios
- Occupation: Painter

Sahara Longe (born 1994) is a British painter. She is best known for her figurative and semi-abstract work, typically including portraits. Her work is held in the collections of the Art Gallery of Ontario and the Royal Collection.

== Biography ==
She was born in London to a British father and a Sierra Leonian mother, but her family moved to rural Sussex when she was six. Both of her grandfathers were painters. From a young age, she was passionate about art, copying comics and caricatures onto the walls of her bedroom. At the age of twelve, she visited the National Portrait Gallery, London, and decided she was interested in working on portraiture.

She attended an all-girls school in Berkshire, and got good grades, which made her decide to attend a traditional university. She ultimately selected Bristol University for art history after taking a year off to spend time in Sierra Leone. However, she soon realized it wasn't right for her, dropping out after the first term.

She worked at a pub while taking art classes, before hearing of the Charles H. Cecil Studios, where she ultimately studied art, spending four years there. She then painted portraits in Sierra Leone and at her home in Sussex, but, in her words, "lost her mojo" due to the classical portrait painting she was doing.

After close to a year, she returned to painting, increasing her colour palette. Her work has been described as getting more impressionistic during this time. Many of her works involve adding Black figures into traditionally white-associated settings. For example, her work The Fall of Man (2020) is a version of the Peter Paul Rubens painting by the same name, but with Black figures and the insertion of a ship in the background, among other changes: she has stated she was inspired by the beginning of the Atlantic slave trade.

She was named to the Artsy Vanguard in 2022. Her work Police Man (2023), inspired by a police argument she witnessed, is held in the collection of the Art Gallery of Ontario. She was commissioned by Charles III to create a portrait of MBE Jessie Stephens for an exhibit on the Windrush Generation held at the Palace of Holyrood and the National Portrait Gallery, London. The exhibit was the subject of a BBC documentary. That painting has since remained in the Royal Collection.

Her first solo show in London, New Shapes, was held at Timothy Taylor in 2023. Her first work sold at auction, a self-portrait, sold for almost triple the estimate. Her first solo institutional exhibit was held at Arnolfini, Bristol in September 2025.

She breeds exotic chickens and brews kombucha. Some of the paints she utilizes, such as mercury sulfide and lead white, are known for their toxicity. She also utilizes other traditional materials such as linseed oil in her paintings.
