= Panharmonicon =

Organ-like musical instrument

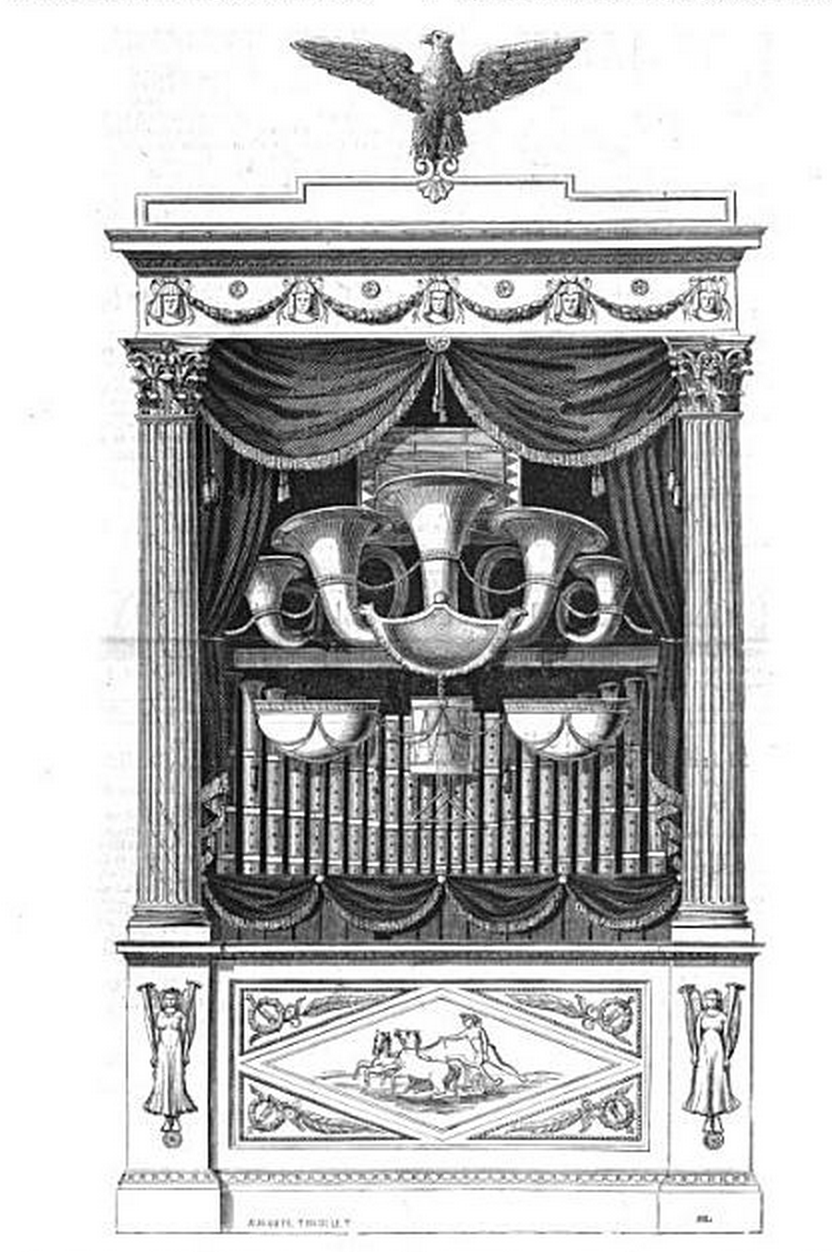
Panharmonicon (L'Illustration, 25 May 1846)

The Panharmonicon was a musical instrument invented in 1805 by Johann Nepomuk Mälzel, a contemporary and friend of Beethoven. Beethoven composed his piece "Wellington's Victory" (Op. 91) to be played on Mälzel's mechanical orchestral organ and also to commemorate Arthur Wellesley's victory over the French at the Battle of Vitoria in 1813. It was one of the first automatic playing machines, similar to the later Orchestrion.

The Panharmonicon could imitate many orchestral instruments as well as sounds like gunfire and cannon shots. One instrument was destroyed in the Landesgewerbemuseum in Stuttgart during an air raid in World War II. Friedrich Kaufmann copied this automatic playing machine in 1808, and his family produced Orchestrions from that time on.

One of Mälzel's Panharmonicons was sent to Boston 1811 and was exhibited there and then in New York City and other cities. Mälzel toured with this instrument in the United States from 7 February 1826, until his death in 1838.

In 1817 Flight & Robson in London built a similar automatic instrument called Apollonicon, advised by the blind organist John Purkis, who had previously written and arranged music for the Panharmonicon. In 1821 Dietrich Nikolaus Winkel copied some features of the Panharmonicon in Amsterdam for his instrument, the Componium, which was also capable of aleatoric composition. In 1823, William M. Goodrich copied Mälzel's Panharmonicon in Boston, MA.
