= Orchestrion =

Orchestral-sounding mechanical instrument

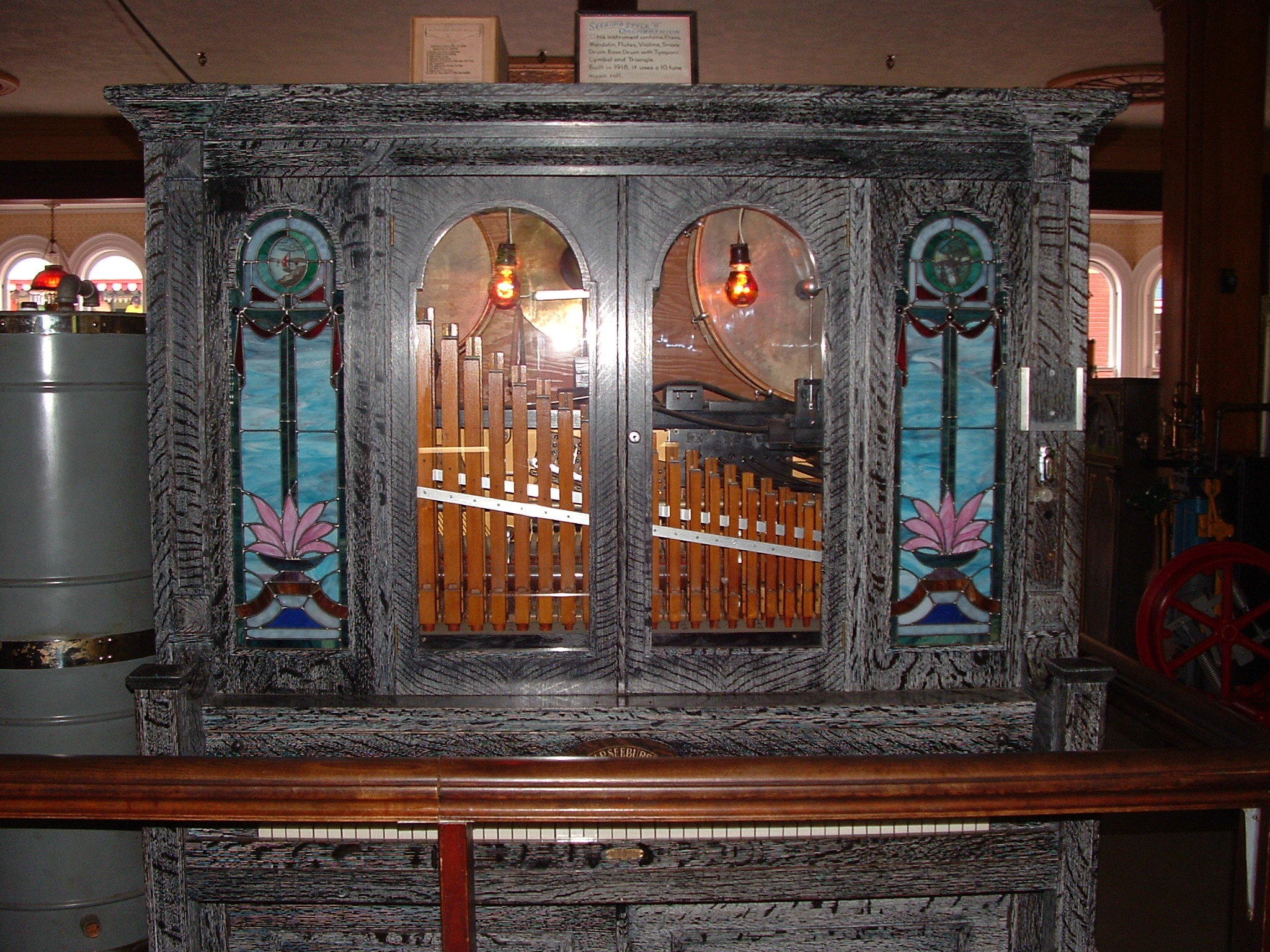
1918 Seeburg Orchestrion, "Style G", located at Clark's Trading Post in Lincoln, New Hampshire. Uses a ten-song music roll and plays multiple wind, string, and percussion instruments.

Orchestrion is a generic name for a machine that plays music and is designed to sound like an orchestra or band. Orchestrions may be operated by means of a large pinned cylinder or by a music roll and less commonly book music. The sound is usually produced by pipes, though they will be voiced differently from those found in a pipe organ, as well as percussion instruments. Many orchestrions contain a piano as well.

== Types ==
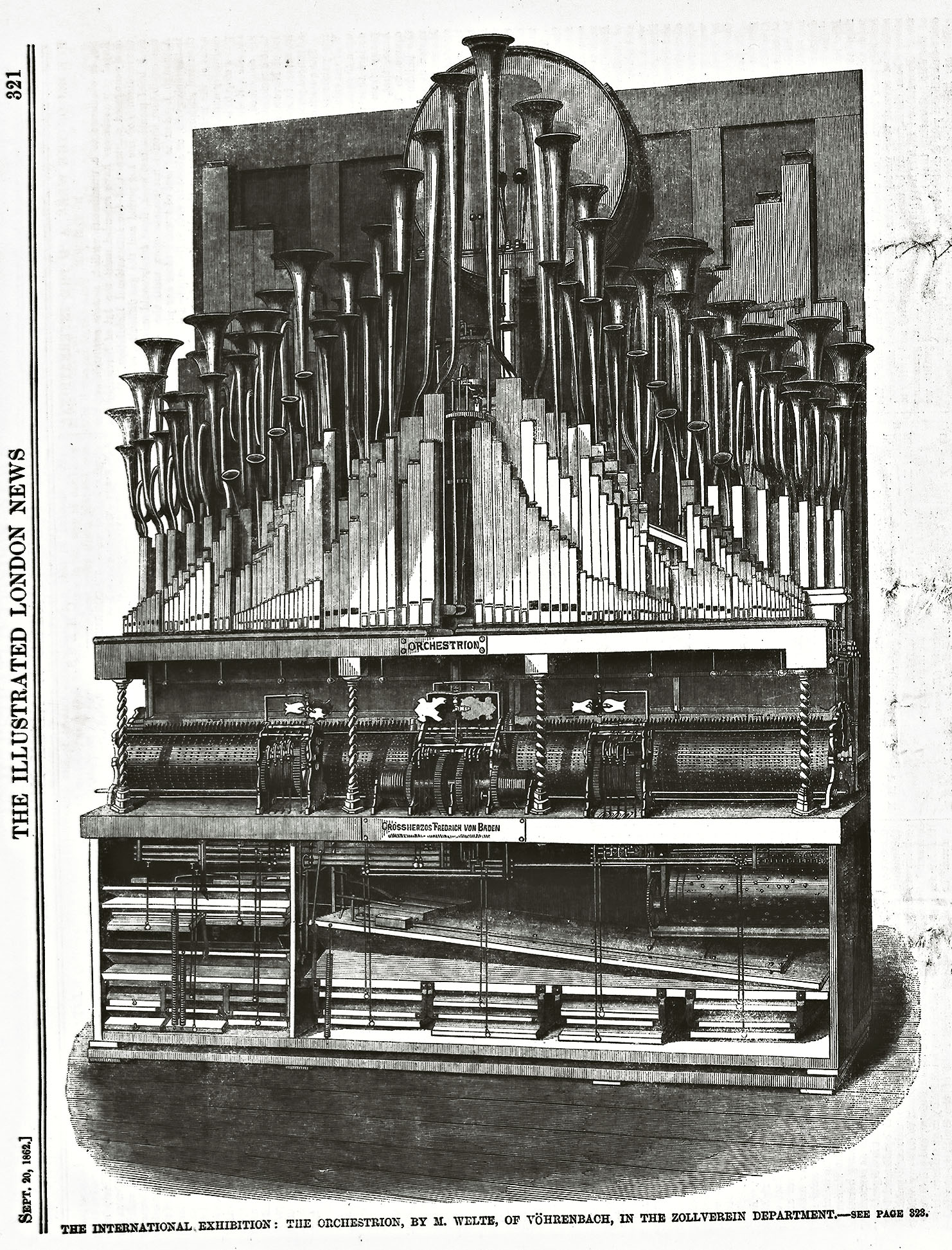
Illustrated London News, Sept. 20, 1862: the Orchestrion by M. Welte, of Vöhrenbach, in the Zollverein Département.

The name "orchestrion" has also been applied to several musical instruments:

=== Chamber organ ===
A chamber organ, designed by Georg Joseph Vogler (Abbé Vogler) in 1790, incorporated 900 pipes, 3 manuals of 63 keys each and 39 pedals in a space of 9 cubic feet (250 dm^{3}).

=== Pianoforte with organ pipe ===
A pianoforte with organ pipes attached, invented by Tomáš Antonín Kunz (1756–1830) of Prague in 1791. This orchestrion comprised two manuals of 65 keys and 25 pedals, all of which could be used either independently or coupled. There were 21 stops, 230 strings and 360 pipes which produced 105 different combinations. The bellows were worked either by hand or by machinery.

=== Player piano ===
The player piano automatically played by means of revolving cylinders, and was invented in 1851 by F. T. Kaufmann of Dresden. It comprised a complete wind orchestra, with the addition of kettle-drums, side drums, cymbals, tambourine and triangle.

=== Panharmonicon ===
The panharmonicon is the earliest known automatic orchestrion. It was invented in 1805 by Johann Nepomuk Mälzel and Beethoven composed Wellington's Victory (or Battle Symphony) in 1813 specifically for it. Friedrich Wilhelm Kaufmann copied this automatic playing machine in 1808 and his family produced orchestrions from that time on. One of Mälzel's panharmonicons was sent to Boston, Massachusetts, in 1811 and was exhibited there and then in New York and other cities. Mälzel was also on tour (with interruptions) with this instrument in the United States from 7 February 1826 until he died in 1838. In 1817 Flight & Robson in London built a similar automatic instrument called Apollonicon and in 1823 William M. Goodrich copied Mälzel's panharmonicon in Boston, United States.

=== Welte ===
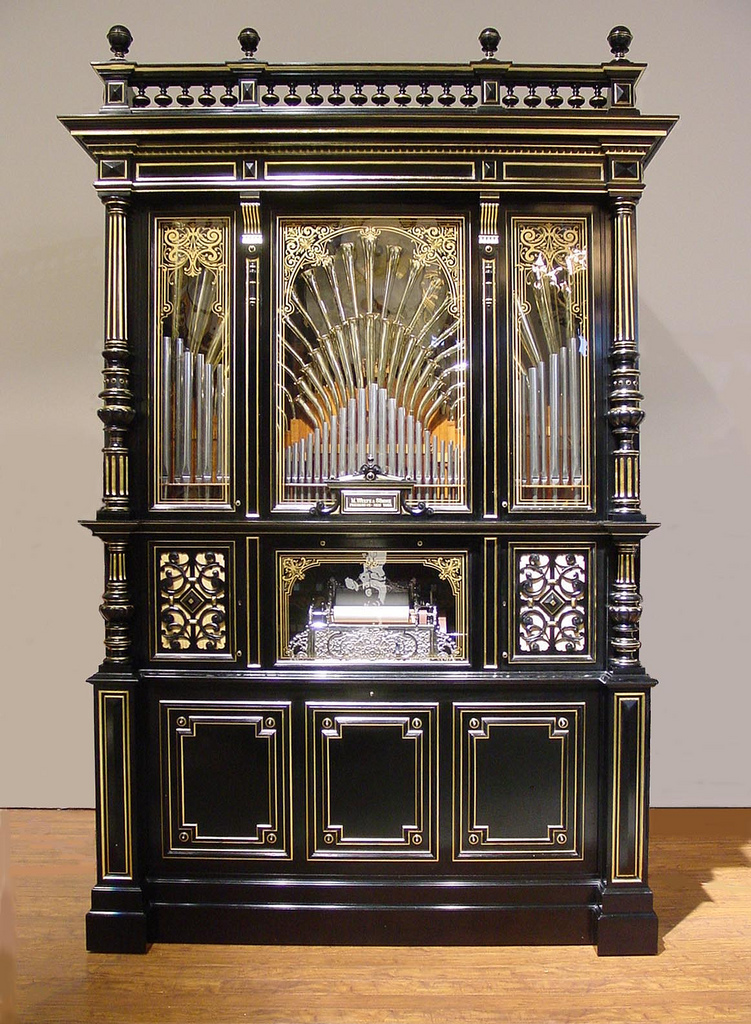
Welte Concert Orchestrion, style 6, number 198 (1895)

Michael Welte & Sons of Freiburg and New York manufactured orchestrions, organs and reproducing pianos, from 1832 until 1932. In 1883, Emil Welte (1841-1923), the eldest son of Michael, who had emigrated to the United States in 1865, patented the paper roll method (U.S. patent 287,599), the model of the later piano roll.

=== Welte Philharmonic Organ ===
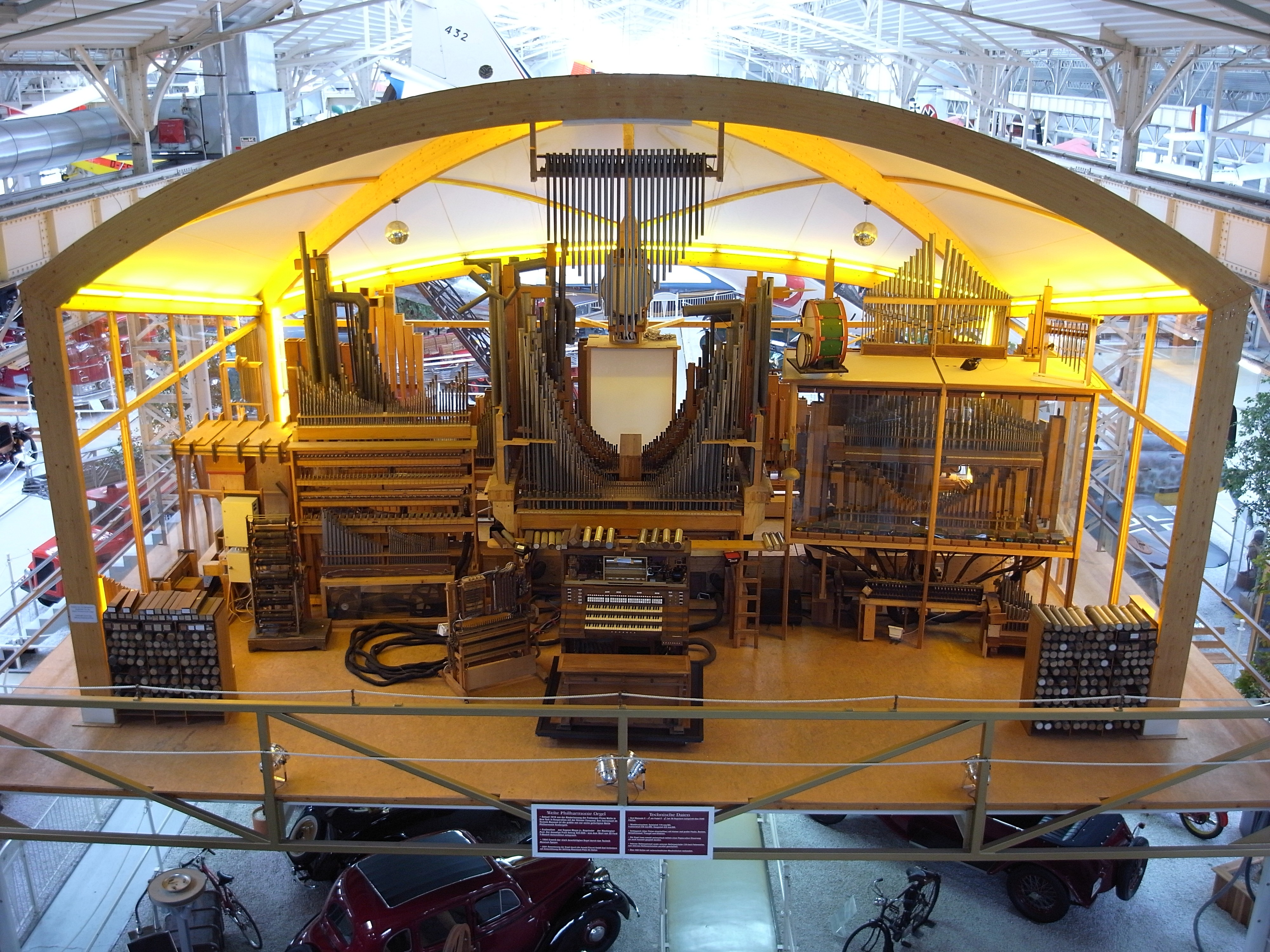
Welte Philharmonic Organ

From 1911 organs branded Welte Philharmonic-Organ were produced.

The largest philharmonic organ ever built is at the Salomons Estate of the Markerstudy Group. This instrument was built in 1914 for Sir David Lionel Salomons to play not only rolls for the organ but also for his Welte Orchestrion No. 10 from about 1900, which he traded in for the organ. One of these organs can also be seen in the Scotty's Castle museum in Death Valley, where it is played regularly during museum tours. An organ built for HMHS Britannic never made its way to Belfast due to the outbreak of the First World War. It can currently be heard playing in the Swiss National Museum in Seewen.

== In popular culture ==
- An orchestrion is featured prominently in P.G. Wodehouse’s comic novel '’The Girl on the Boat'’ (1922).
- An unnamed orchestrion appeared as a secondary character in Disney’s Herbie Rides Again (1974).
- The Pendragon is an orchestrion essential to the plot of Professor Layton and the Eternal Diva (2009).

== See also ==
- Fairground organ
- Photoplayer
- The Orchestrion Project - An album by Pat Metheny
- Zaharakos Ice Cream Parlor
- Kennywood Park great example in their carousel
