= Thomas Adams (organist, born 1785) =

English organist and composer

Thomas Adams (5 September 1785 – 15 September 1858) was an English organist and composer for organ. He was one of the most remarkable organists, improvisators and extempore performers of his day.

Born probably in London, Adams studied under Dr. Thomas Busby and served as organist at several prominent London churches, namely Carlisle Chapel, Lambeth; St. Paul's, Deptford; St. George's, Camberwell; St. Dunstan-in-the-East. His published organ works include many fugues, voluntaries, ninety interludes, and several variations on popular airs. He also wrote variations for piano and many anthems, hymns, and sacred songs. For many years he was in charge of performances on Flight & Robson's Apollonicon.

Among his students was Edward Collett May.

He died in London at the age of 73 on 15 September 1858.

== Note ==
- This article or an earlier version incorporates text from the 3rd edition (1919) of Baker's Biographical Dictionary of Musicians, a publication now in the public domain.
