= International Film Music Critics Association Award for Best Original Score for a Short Film =

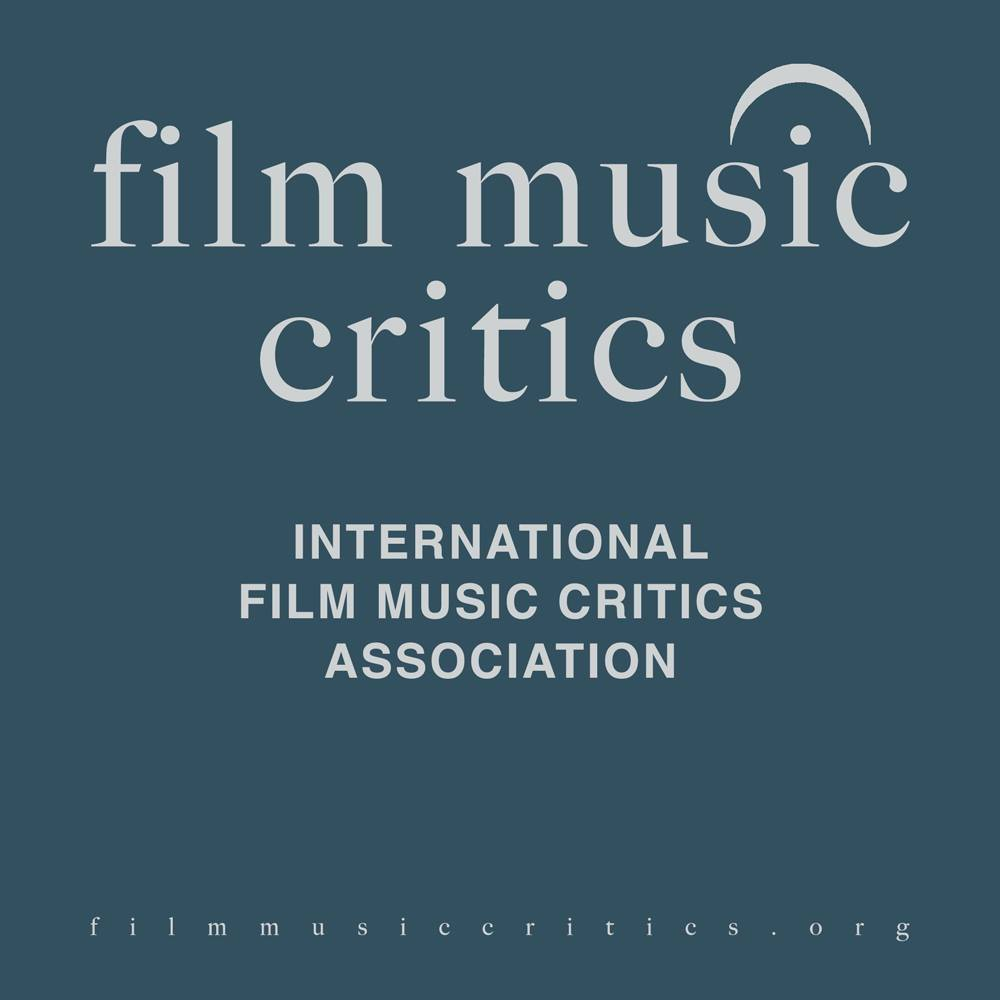
- International Film Music Critics Association logo
- First award: 2025

The International Film Music Critics Association Award for Best Original Score for a Short Film is an annual award given by the International Film Music Critics Association (IFMCA). Established in 2025, the award is given to the composer of a film or television score for a short film based on two criteria: the effectiveness, appropriateness and emotional impact of the score in the context of the film for which it was written; and the technical and intellectual merit of the composition when heard as a standalone listening experience." Short films of all genres are eligible, however; the film must be shorter than 50 minutes. The eligibility period runs January 1 through December 31 every year, and IFMCA members vote for the winner the following February.

== Winners and nominees ==
In the tables below, winners are marked by a light green background and a double-dagger symbol (‡).

=== 2020s ===
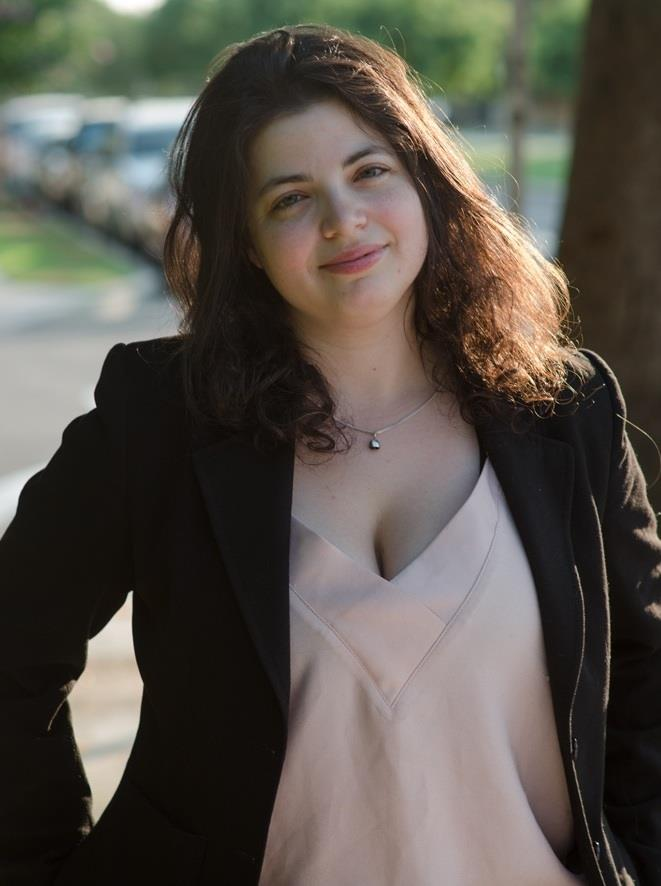
Nami Melumad (pictured in 2018) is a 2024 nominee.

Awards in the 2000s
| Year | Short Film | Composer(s) | Ref. |
|---|---|---|---|
| 2024 | Go for Grandma‡ | Fabrizio Mancinelli | |
| 2024 | An Almost Christmas Story | Daniel Hart | |
| 2024 | Carmen y La Cuchara de Palo (Note: English: Carmen and the Wooden Spoon) | Iván Palomares | |
| 2024 | The Ice Cream Man | Nami Melumad | |
| 2024 | The Only Girl in the Orchestra | Laura Karpman | |
