= Componium =

Musical instrument

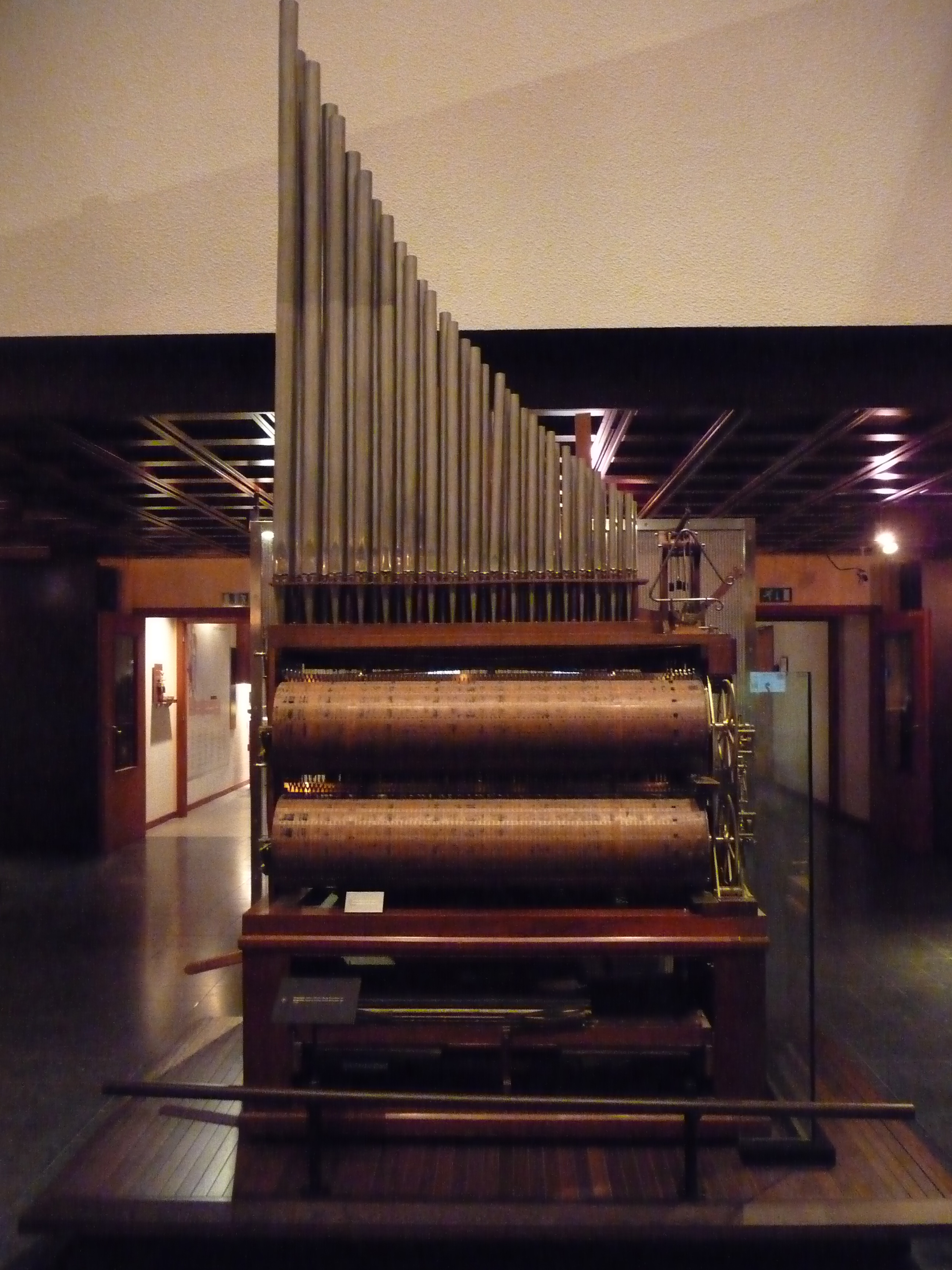
Museum of Musical Instruments, Brussels. The Componium, invented in 1821 by Dietrich Nikolaus Winkel is an orchestrion with a random mechanism, created to play endless variations on a theme.

The componium is a mechanical musical instrument constructed in 1821 by Dietrich Nikolaus Winkel (Lippstatt, Germany, 1777 – Amsterdam, Netherlands, 1826) that composes novel music. It is an automatic organ consisting of two barrels that revolve simultaneously. The barrels take turns performing two measures of randomly chosen music while the other, silent, slides horizontally to select the next variation. A roulette-like flywheel chooses whether or not the next variation is selected. The instrument plays an 80 measure piece, with eight variations for every two measures.

The componium's compositional power is thus limited to new combinations of the music provided in its barrels.

This instrument is believed to have copied some features of Johann Nepomuk Mälzels panharmonicon, but added the aleatoric composition feature.

The componium, in a rather bad shape now, is in the collection of the Brussels Museum of Instruments.

== Discography ==
- An unrecognised melody. Recorded in 1967 or 1969. Published originally in LP record Opname uit de verzamelingen van het Instrumentenmuseum te Brussel/Enregistrements de la collection du Musée instrumental de Bruxelles ([Brussel?] : Nationale Diskoteek van België, [1972?]. D.N.B. 30.007), which also accompanies book Les instruments de musique dans l'art et l'histoire by R. Bragard and Ferd. J. de Hen (Bruxelles, 1973); republished in CD record Instruments insolites/Muzikale meesterstukken/Unusual sounds (Bruxelles: Musée des instruments de musique (mim), ©2013. mim MIM015)
