= Edward Collett May =

English music educator (1806–1887)

Edward Collett May (29 October 1806 – 2 January 1887) was an English music educator.

== Life ==
May was born in Greenwich, where his father was a shipbuilder. His first teacher was his brother Henry, an amateur musician and composer of considerable ability. When about fifteen years of age, Thomas Adams, then organist of St. Paul's, Deptford, and an intimate friend of the May family, struck by the promise and intelligence of Edward, offered to take him as a pupil. This offer was, of course, willingly accepted, and for several years he received regular instruction in composition and organ-playing from him. Subsequently he became a pupil of Cipriani Potter for the piano, and of Domenico Crivelli for singing. In 1837 he was appointed organist of Greenwich Hospital, an office he held till the abolition of the institution in 1869.

May's career as a music educator grew out of his accidental attendance at one of many lectures on popular instruction in vocal music given by John Pyke Hullah about the year 1841. From that time on he devoted himself enthusiastically and exclusively to such teaching, and taught a tremendous number of students; Hullah claimed that "to no individual, of any age or country, have so many persons of all ages and of both sexes been indebted for their musical skill." At one institution alone, the National Society's Central School, more than a thousand teachers and many more children have been instructed by him. At Exeter Hall, the Apollonicon rooms, and subsequently St. Martin's Hall, several thousand adults passed through his classes; while, for many years past, he has been the sole musical instructor at the Training Schools, Battersea, St. Mark's, Whitelands, Home and Colonial, and Hockerill; institutions from which upwards of 250 teachers are annually sent forth to elementary schools. He was appointed Professor of Vocal Music in Queen's College, London.

His daughter, Florence May, was known in London as a pianoforte player of considerable cultivation and power.
