= Malbrough s'en va-t-en guerre =

French folk song

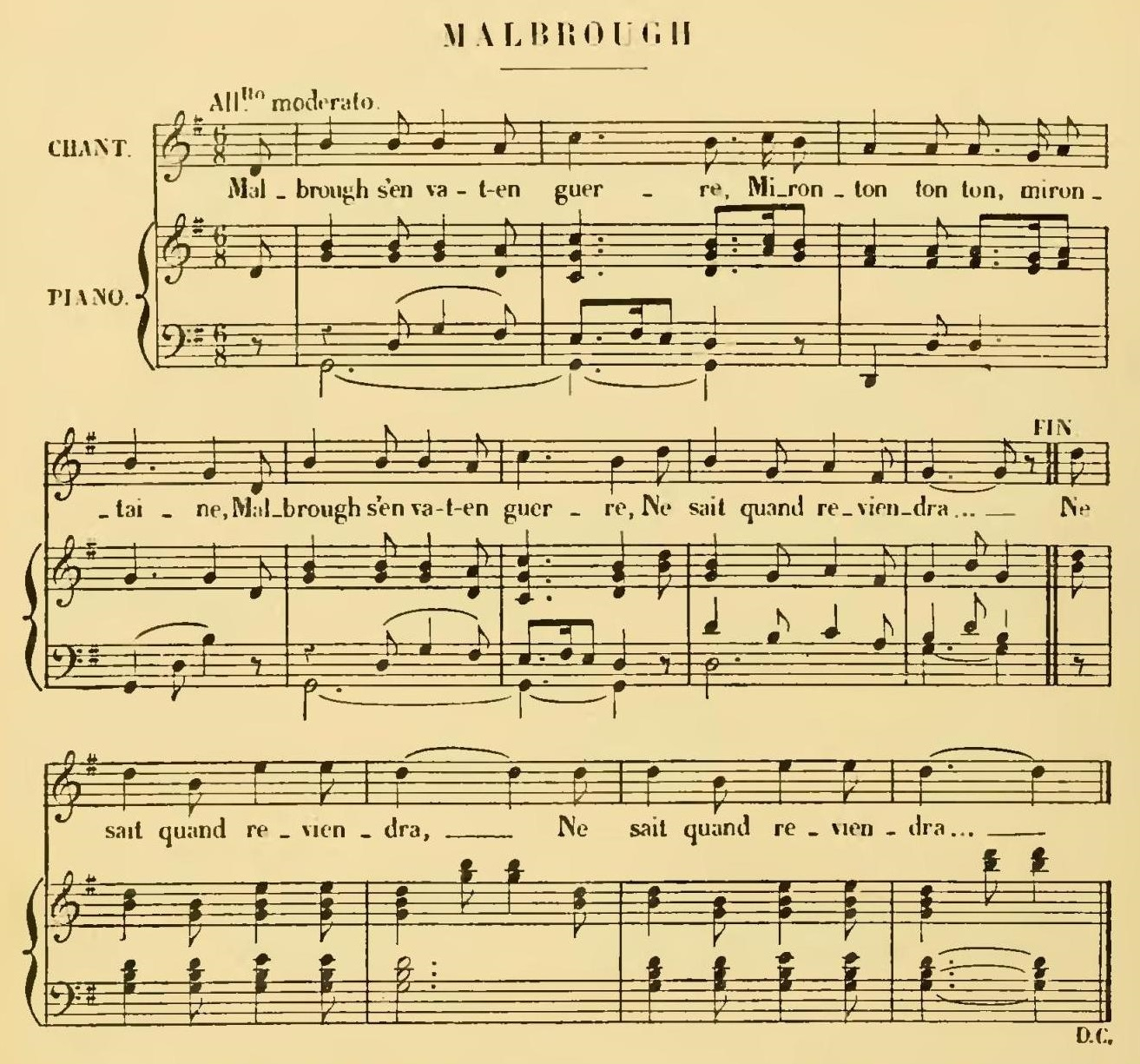
Sheet music for Malbrough

"Malbrough s'en va-t-en guerre ("Marlborough is going off to war", French pronunciation: [malbʁu sɑ̃ vatɑ̃ ɡɛʁ]), also known as "Mort et convoi de l'invincible Malbrough" ("The death and burial of the invincible Marlborough"), is a folk song in French.

== History ==
The burlesque lament on the death of John Churchill, 1st Duke of Marlborough (1650–1722) was written on a false rumour of that event after the Battle of Malplaquet in 1709, the bloodiest battle of the War of the Spanish Succession. It tells how Marlborough's wife, awaiting his return from battle, is given the news of her husband's death. It also tells that he was buried and that a nightingale sang over his grave.

For years it was only known traditionally, and does not appear among the many anecdotic songs printed in France during the middle of the 18th century. Pierre Beaumarchais used the tune in his 1778 play The Marriage of Figaro for a despairing love song for Cherubino. In 1780 it became very popular. For instance, the tune concludes a sonata (in D-major) for viola d'amore and viola composed by Carl Stamitz in 1780 while in Paris. And it happened that when Prince Louis-Joseph was born in 1781 (son of Louis XVI and Marie Antoinette and heir to the French throne) he was wet-nursed by a peasant named Geneviève Poitrine. The nurse, whilst rocking the royal cradle, sang "Marlborough s'en va-t-en guerre". The name, the simplicity of the words, and the melodiousness of the tune, interested the queen, and she frequently sang it. Everybody repeated it after her, including the king. The song was sung in the state apartments of Versailles, in the kitchens and in the stables – it became immensely popular. Nicolas Dalayrac quoted the melody in the first act of his opera Renaud d'Ast (1787).

From the court it was adopted by the tradespeople of Paris, and it passed from town to town, and country to country. It became as popular in England as in France. Johann Wolfgang von Goethe came to hate Marlborough simply on account of the prevalence of the tune he encountered during travels in France. It also became popular in Spain due to the Bourbon dynasty's influence on Spanish nobility. There the name Marlborough was modified to an easier to pronounce Mambrú. It was sung by children while playing Rayuela (hopscotch). Jacinto Valledor's tonadilla "La cantada vida y muerte del general Malbrú" concludes with the tune, and in 1826 the Spanish guitarist and composer Fernando Sor (1778–1839) created his Introduction & Variations For Guitar on Marlborough s'en va-t-en guerre, op. 28. It then spread to Latin America.

The rage endured for many years, slowly fading after the French Revolution, although, it is said that Napoleon liked to hum the tune, for instance when crossing the Memel (June 1812) at the beginning of his fatal Russian campaign. The melody also became widely popular in the United Kingdom. By the mid-19th century it was being sung with the words "For He's a Jolly Good Fellow", often at all-male social gatherings. By 1862, these lyrics were already familiar in America. From this version, the melody also became the tune for a popular American campfire tune "The Bear Went Over the Mountain".

The song has been translated into several languages, including an English version published by the American poet Henry Wadsworth Longfellow in the 19th century.

== Verses ==
French Original

Malbrough s'en va-t-en guerre,
mironton, mironton, mirontaine,
Malbrough s'en va-t-en guerre,
Ne sait quand reviendra.

Il reviendra-z-à Pâques,
mironton, mironton, mirontaine,
Il reviendra-z-à Pâques,
ou à la Trinité.

La Trinité se passe,
mironton, mironton, mirontaine,
la Trinité se passe,
Malbrough ne revient pas.

Madame à sa tour monte,
mironton, mironton, mirontaine,
Madame à sa tour monte
si haut qu'elle peut monter.

Elle voit venir son page,
mironton, mironton, mirontaine,
elle voit venir son page,
tout de noir habillé.

Beau page, mon beau page,
mironton, mironton, mirontaine,
beau page, mon beau page,
quelles nouvelles apportez?

Aux nouvelles que j'apporte,
mironton, mironton, mirontaine,
aux nouvelles que j'apporte,
vos beaux yeux vont pleurer!

Quittez vos habits roses,
mironton, mironton, mirontaine,
quittez vos habits roses,
et vos satins brodés!

Monsieur Malbrough est mort.
mironton, mironton, mirontaine,
Monsieur Malbrough est mort.
Est mort et enterré.

Je l'ai vu porter en terre,
mironton, mironton, mirontaine,
Je l'ai vu porter en terre,
par quatre-z-officiers.

Literal English

Marlborough is going to war
Mironton mironton mirontaine
Marlborough is going to war
Doesn't know when he'll come back

He'll come back for Easter
Mironton mironton mirontaine
He'll come back for Easter
Or for Trinity Sunday

Trinity Sunday is over
Mironton mironton mirontaine
Trinity Sunday is over
Marlborough isn't back

Her Ladyship goes up into her tower
Mironton mironton mirontaine
Her Ladyship goes up into her tower
As high up as she can

She sees a page coming
Mironton mironton mirontaine
She sees a page coming
Dressed all in black

Oh page, oh my beautiful page
Mironton mironton mirontaine
Oh page, oh my beautiful page
What news do you bring?

When hearing the news I bring
Mironton mironton mirontaine
When hearing the news I bring
Your beautiful eyes will cry

Mister Marlborough is dead
Mironton mironton mirontaine
Mister Marlborough is dead
And dead and buried

I saw him buried
Mironton mironton mirontaine
I saw him buried
By four officers

Poetic Version

Marlborough the Prince of Commanders
Is gone to war in Flanders,
His fame is like Alexander's,
But when will he ever come home?
Mironton, mironton, mirontaine.

Perhaps at Trinity Feast, or
Perhaps he may come at Easter,
Egad! he had better make haste or
We fear he may never come home.
Mironton etc.

For Trinity Feast is over,
And has brought no news from Dover,
And Easter is pass'd moreover,
And Marlborough still delays.

Milady in her watch-tower
Spends many a pensive hour,
Not knowing why or how her
Dear lord from England stays.

While sitting quite forlorn in
That tower, she spies returning
A page clad in deep mourning,
With fainting steps and slow.

"O page, prithee come faster!
What news do you bring of your master?
I fear there is some disaster,
Your looks are so full of woe."

"The news I bring fair lady,"
With sorrowful accent said he,
"Is one you are not ready
So soon, alas! to hear.

"But since to speak I'm hurried,"
Added this page, quite flurried,
"Marlborough is dead and buried!"
And here he shed a tear.

"He's dead! He's dead as a herring!
For I beheld his bearing,
And four officers transferring
His corpse away from the field.

"One officer carried his sabre,
And he carried it not without labour,
Much envying his next neighbour,
Who only bore a shield.

"The third was helmet bearer –
That helmet which in its wearer
Fill'd all who saw it with terror,
And cover'd a hero's brains.

"Now, having got so far, I
Find that – by the Lord Harry!
The fourth is left nothing to carry.
So there the thing remains."
Mironton, mironton, mirontaine.

== In popular culture ==
The song is one of several contemporary tunes that are played by the musical box of the Negress head clock, made in Paris in 1784. Rita Dove references the song and the clock in her 2009 poem "Ode on a Negress Head Clock, with Eight Tunes".

Ludwig van Beethoven used the tune to represent the French in his musical work Wellington's Victory.
