= For He's a Jolly Good Fellow =

Popular song from the mid-19th century

jolly old folk song
MIDI rendition

"For He's a Jolly Good Fellow" or "For She's a Jolly Good Fellow" (depending on gender) is a popular song that is sung to congratulate a person on a significant event, such as a promotion, a birthday, getting a new job, a wedding (or playing a major part in a wedding), a retirement, a wedding anniversary, the birth of a child, or the winning of a championship sporting event. The melody originates from the French song "Malbrough s'en va-t-en guerre" ("Marlborough is going off to War").

According to the Guinness Book of World Records, "For He's a Jolly Good Fellow" is the third most popular song in the English language, following "Happy Birthday to You" and "Auld Lang Syne".

== History ==
The tune is of French origin (known as Malbrough s'en va-t-en guerre, meaning "Marlborough is going off to war") and dates at least from the 18th century. Allegedly it was composed the night after the Battle of Malplaquet in 1709. It became a French folk tune and was popularised by Marie Antoinette after she heard one of her maids singing it. The melody became so popular in France that it was used to represent the French defeat in Beethoven's composition Wellington's Victory, Op. 91, written in 1813. In 1826 the Spanish guitarist and composer Fernando Sor (1778-1839) published his Introduction & Variations For Guitar on Marlborough s'en va-t-en guerre, op. 28.

The melody also became widely popular in the United Kingdom. By the mid-19th century it was being sung with the words "For he's a jolly good fellow", often at all-male social gatherings, and "For she's a jolly good fellow", often at all-female social gatherings. By 1862, it was already familiar in the United States.

The British and the American versions of the lyrics differ. "And so say all of us" is typically British, while "which nobody can deny" is regarded as the American version, but the latter has been used by non-American writers, including Charles Dickens in Household Words, Hugh Stowell Brown in Lectures to the Men of Liverpool and James Joyce in Finnegans Wake. (In the short story "The Dead" from Dubliners, Joyce has a version that goes, "For they are jolly gay fellows..." with a refrain between verses of "Unless he tells a lie".) The 1935 American film Ruggles of Red Gap, set in rural Washington State, ends with repeated choruses of the song, with the two variations sung alternately.

== Text ==
As with many songs that use gender-specific pronouns, the song can be altered to match with the gender of the intended recipient. If the song is being sung to two or more people, it is altered to use plurals.

=== British version ===
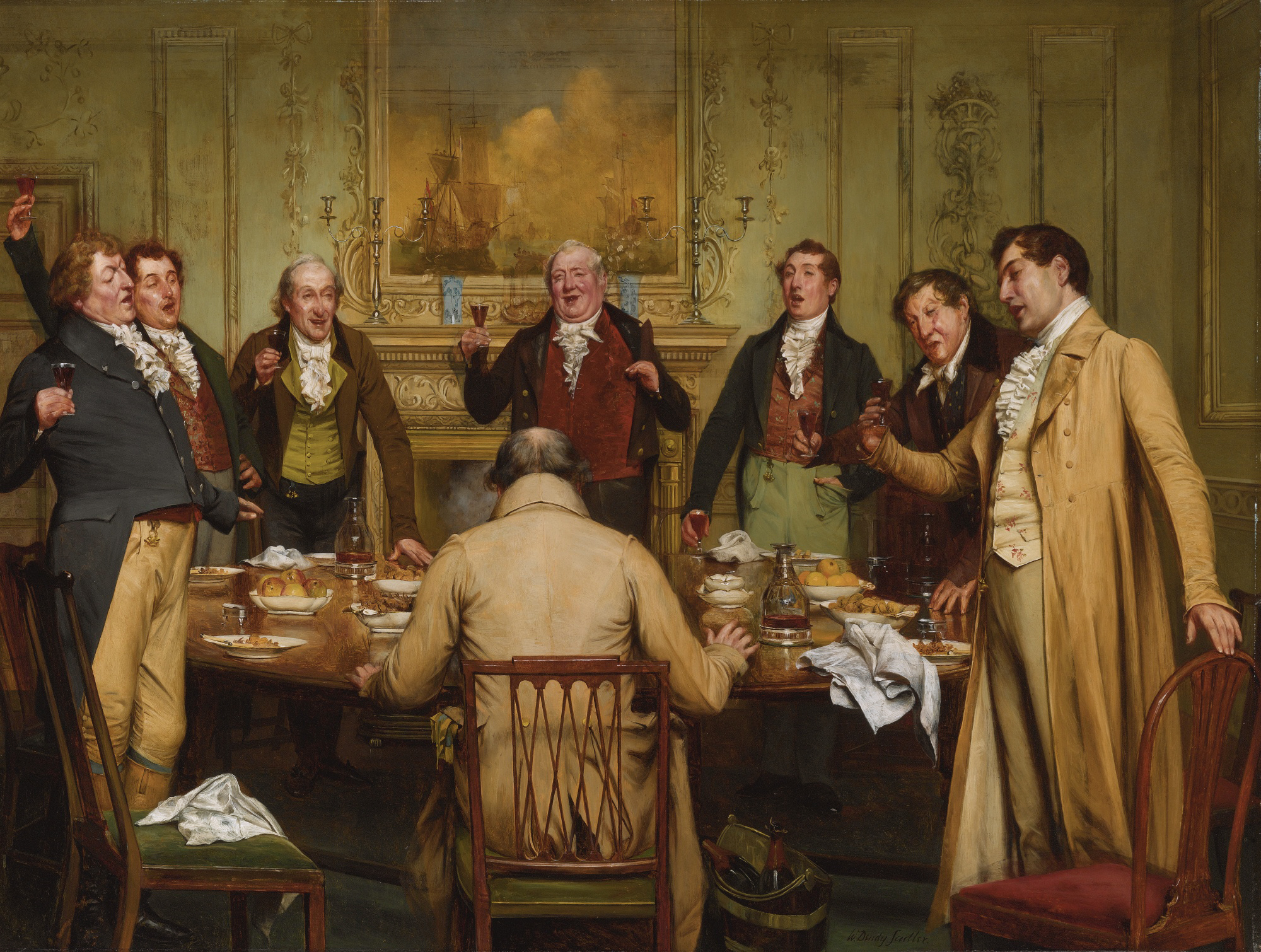
For he's a jolly good fellow and so say all of us, by Walter Dendy Sadler

For he's a jolly good fellow, for he's a jolly good fellow,
For he's a jolly good fellow, and so say all of us.
And so say all of us, and so say all of us,
For he's a jolly good fellow, for he's a jolly good fellow,
For he's a jolly good fellow (pause), and so say all of us!

=== Scots version ===
For he's a jolly good fellow, for he's a jolly good fellow,
For he's a jolly good fellow, an' so say ah o' us.
An so say ah o' us, an so say ah o' us,
For he's a jolly good fellow, for he's a jolly good fellow,
For he's a jolly good fellow (pause), an so say ah o' us!

=== American version ===
For he's a jolly good fellow, for he's a jolly good fellow,
For he's a jolly good fellow, which nobody can deny.
Which nobody can deny, which nobody can deny,
For he's a jolly good fellow, for he's a jolly good fellow,
For he's a jolly good fellow (pause), which nobody can deny!

== See also ==
- The Bear Went Over the Mountain
