= Negress head clock =

Type of mantel clock

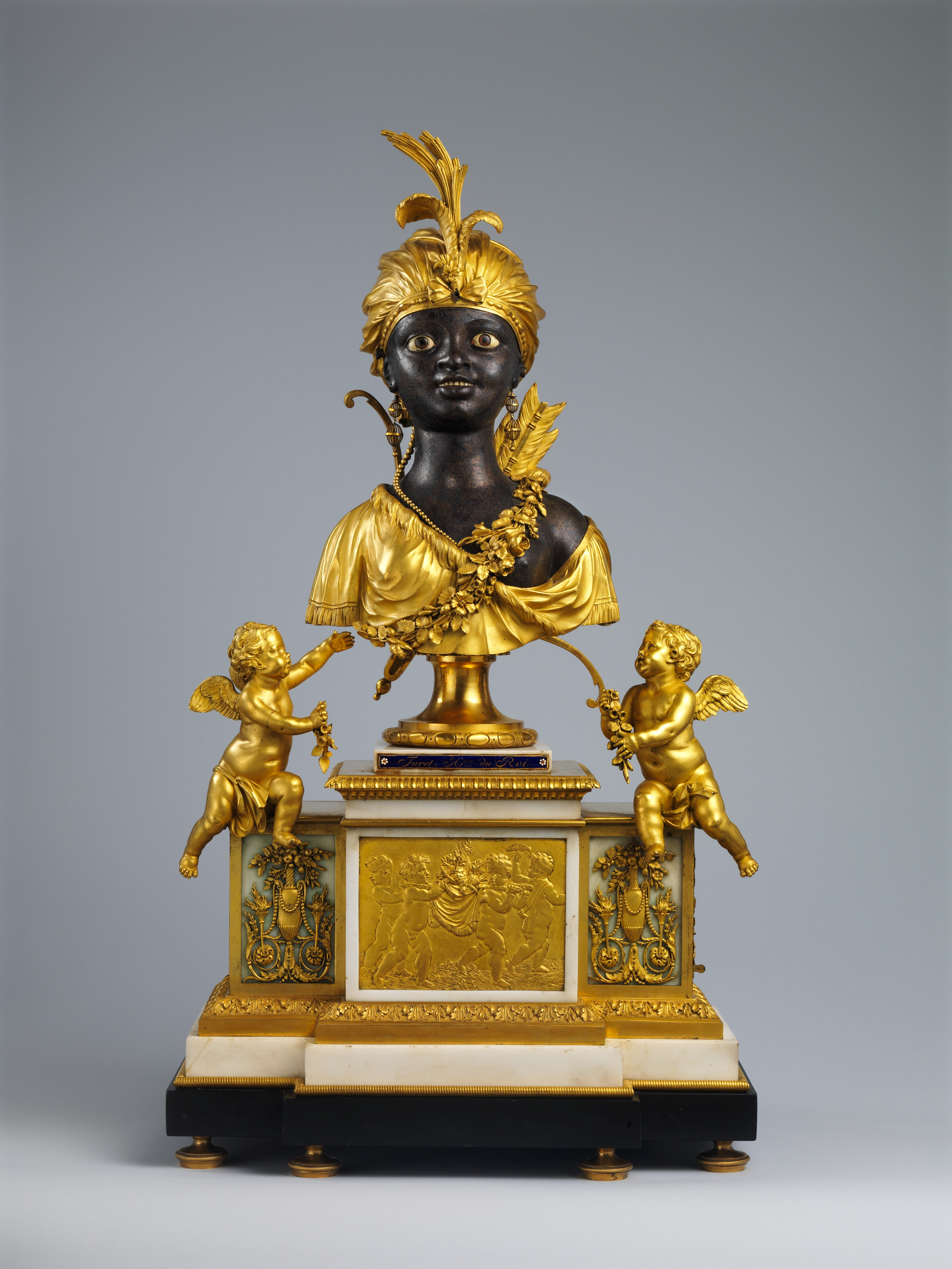
The 'Negress head clock' in the Metropolitan Museum of Art

The Negress head clock is a type of French Empire mantel clock depicting the head of a black woman flanked by sculptured putti. It is considered among the eccentricities of French horology and had drawn attention during the late eighteenth century. Five examples are noted in prominent collections.

== Background ==
There are several individuals who claimed to have invented the Negress head clock. The Marquess of Worcester, for instance, patented the device in 1661, the same year Grollier de Serviere began producing the timepiece. Maurice Wheeler also claimed that he created the device in the Abridgment of the Philosophical Transactions in 1684. The most prominent version was that made by the French clockmaker Jean-Baptiste-André Furet, which was subsequently copied. Furet's work was produced ca. 1720–1807. Examples of the clock are in the collections of the Metropolitan Museum of Art in New York City, the Hillwood Museum, Washington, D.C., and the British and Spanish royal collections. A fifth clock is in a private collection.

The clock is mentioned in an entry on 4 July 1784 in the anonymous Mémoires secrets that detailed daily life in late 18th-century Paris. The Mémoires relates that "The curious are going to M. Furet's shop in the rue Saint-Honoré to see three extraordinary clocks of his creation. The first represents the bust of a negress exceptionally made ... Upon pulling one ear-ring the hour is described in the right eye and the minutes in the left. Upon pulling the other a musical movement plays a succession of airs".

Rita Dove's poem on the clock, "Ode on a Negress Head Clock, with Eight Tunes" was included in Dove's 2009 collection, Sonata Mulattica. It was also published in 2009 in The Kenyon Review. The poem is about the clock and a child playing the song "Marlbrough s'en va-t-en guerre" ("Marlborough Has Left for the War") for his late father.

== Design ==
The clock is made from gilt and lacquered bronze and contains a musical box encased in its marble plinth. It is in the form of a bust of an African woman; she wears a turban and aigrette, and a draped tunic that has a 'garland of flowers and foliage'. A bow and quiver of arrows is attached to her back. Two gilt bronze putti flank either side of her.

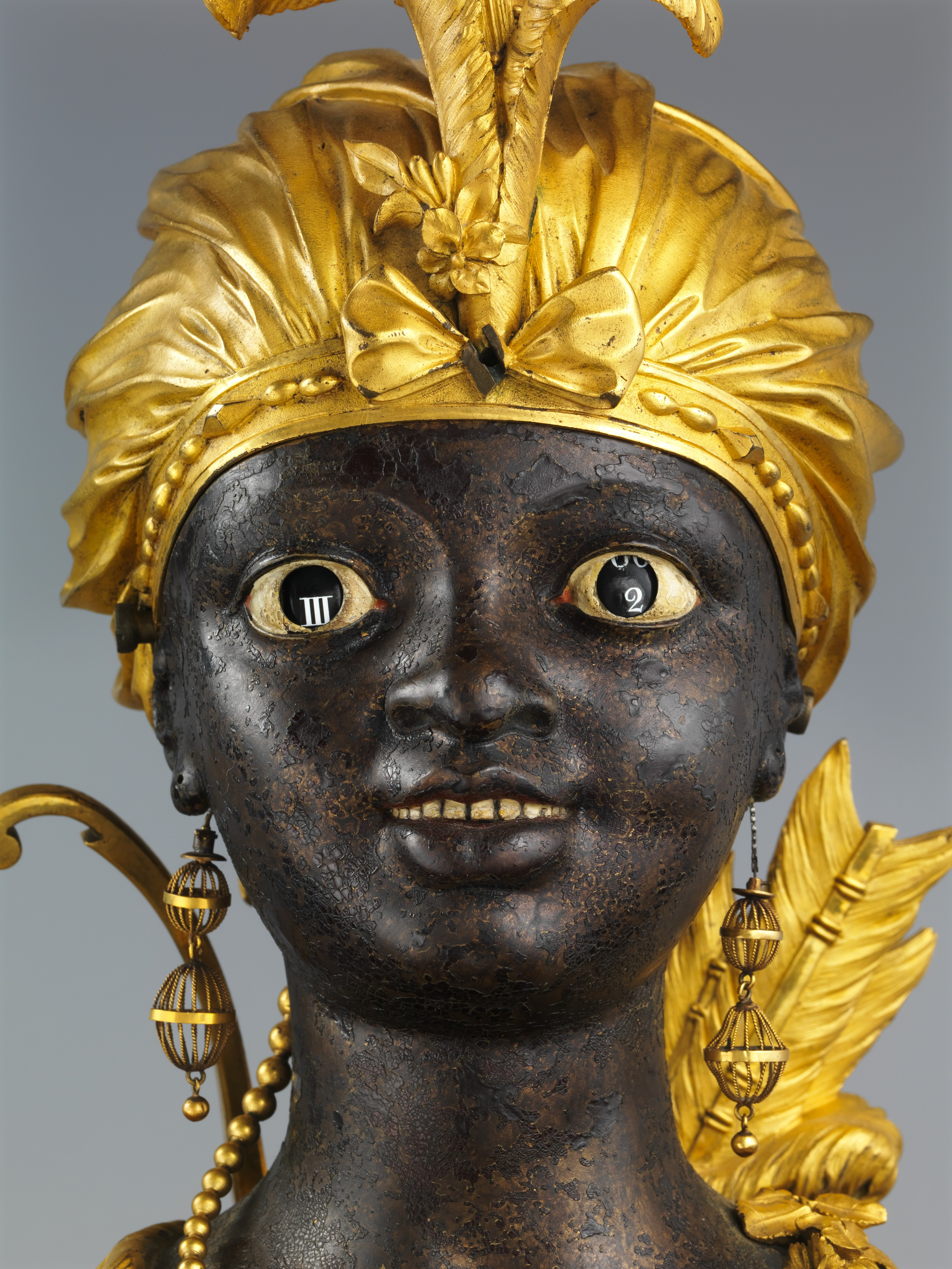
The digits on the eyes of the clock

The time is shown on the clock with her eyes: the hours are shown in Roman numerals in her right eye (the left eye from the viewer's perspective) with the minutes in Arabic numerals in her left eye. At ten minutes to the hour her pupils slide back to display the time and close at two minutes past the hour. Her eyes can be reopened by pulling the earring in her right ear.

=== Musical pieces ===
The base of the clock in the British Royal Collection contains a music box with a sixteen-pipe organ. It is activated by pulling the right earring of the head. The box plays eight tunes, of which half, all contemporaneous French songs, have been identified:

1. The chorus "Que d'attraits" from Act One of Christoph Willibald Gluck's 1774 Iphigénie en Aulide
2. The popular song "Marlbrough s'en va-t-en guerre" ("Marlborough Has Left for the War")
3. "Quand le bien-aime reviendra" from Nicolas Dalayrac's 1786 opera Nina, ou La folle par amour
4. "Escouto d' Jeanetto" from Dalayrac's 1789 opera Les deux petits Savoyards

== Depiction of blackness ==
The person depicted is a black woman intended as a personification of the continent of Africa. It was typical of Western artists in the 18th century to portray Africa as a woman of black skin with earrings or a turban. The Hillwood Museum describes the allegorical woman of 'Africa', very often one of a set of the "Four Continents", as being historically depicted as "a Moorish woman (dark-skinned Muslim from Northern Africa), partially nude, wearing an elephant-head crest, coral necklace, and pendant earrings, holding a scorpion and cornucopia full of grain, while surrounded by a fierce lion and poisonous snakes". The exoticized use of images of black people was common in the early modern period; their blackness was associated with luxury in the decorative arts with the blackamoor motif.

== Examples ==
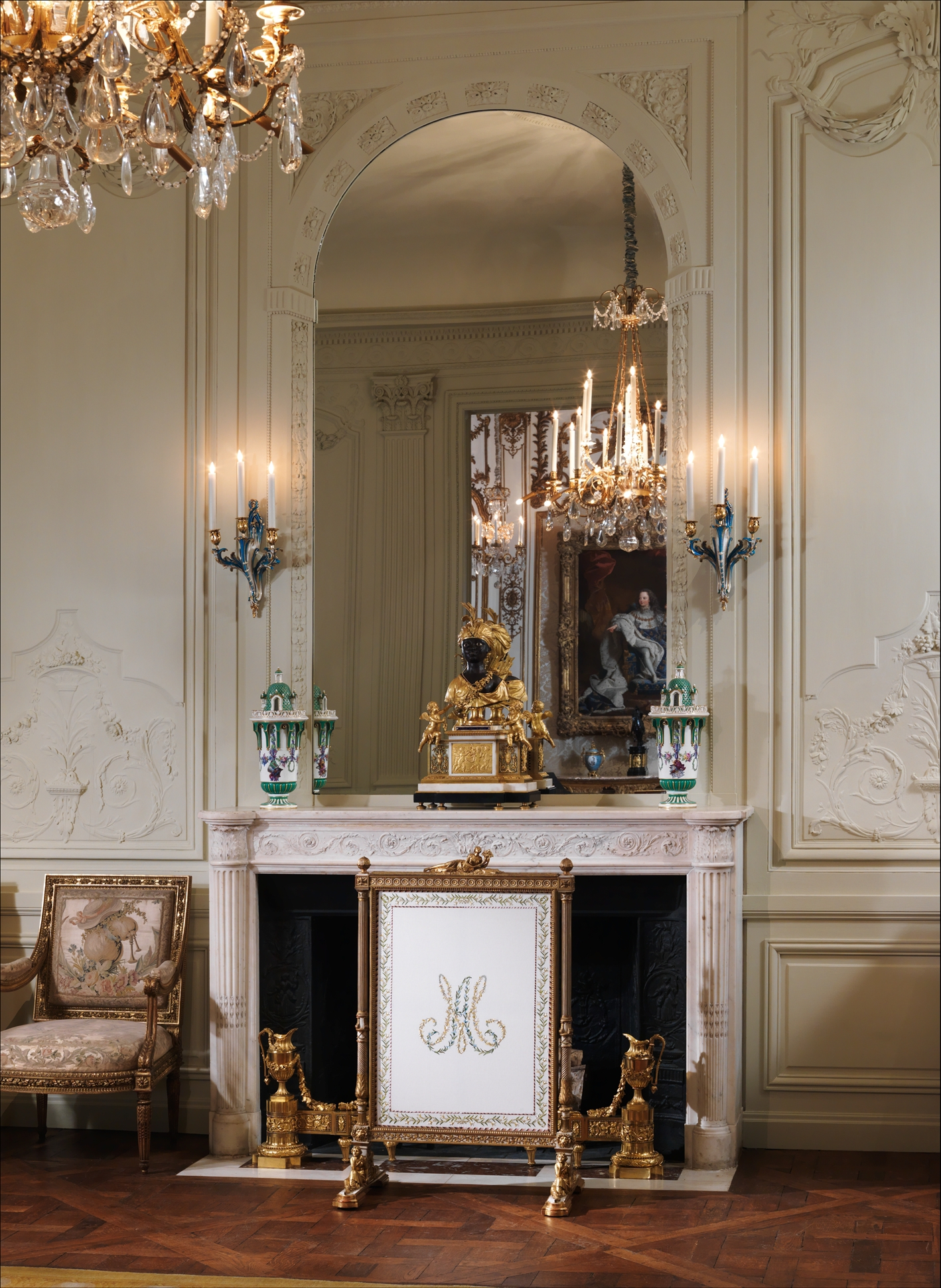
The clock in situ at the Metropolitan Museum of Art in New York City

=== British royal collection ===
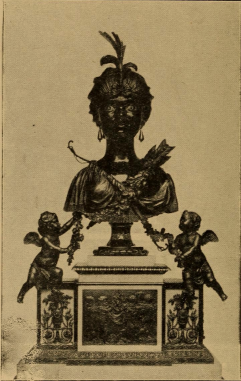
The Negress head clock at Buckingham Palace, pictured in 1922.

The example in the Royal Collection of the United Kingdom was made by Jean-Antoine Lépine in 1790 and is displayed in the music room at Windsor Castle. The clock is believed to have been bought directly from Lépine by George, Prince of Wales, in 1790; George had spent £3,250 with Lépine that year (equivalent to £423,663 in 2025). Some £2,850 of the bill was still owed in 1796; having been unpaid due to the upheaval caused by the French Revolution. Lépine was still seeking the outstanding payment of his bill in 1799.

It is first recorded in a repair bill from Vulliamy dating from 1807; the bill refers to the clock as the 'African Princess clock'. The clock was then in the Gilt Room of Carlton House. The clock was catalogued in the Pictorial Inventory of 1827–1833 that was drawn up as a record of decorative items from Carlton House and other royal residences for the refurbishment of Windsor Castle.

It was shown at the Grosvenor House Arts & Antiques Fair in 1948. The New Yorker magazine, in describing the clock, wrote that "The lady rather gruesomely tells the hour with her right eye and the minute with her left".

=== Spanish royal collection ===
An example is part of the Spanish royal collection at the Royal Palace of Madrid.

=== Hillwood Museum ===
The example in the collection of the Hillwood Museum, in Washington, D.C., was donated by Marjorie Merriweather Post in 1973. The Hillwood clock is unfinished; it lacks the musical organ and movements to activate the numbers in the eyes, and the eyes are wooden rather than of porcelain as with the other examples. The earrings are also of lesser quality.

=== Metropolitan Museum of Art ===
The clock in the collection of the Metropolitan Museum of Art was made by Jean-Baptiste-André Furet. It was donated to the museum by the Samuel H. Kress Foundation in 1958, having formerly been in the collections of the French collector Léopold Double and the American banker and collector C. Ledyard Blair.

=== Private collection ===
The example in a private collection is the clock that was presented at the Tuileries Palace to the Dauphin of France, Louis, in 1792 as a gift to mark the New Year. It had been bought by the Intendant and Comptroller General of the Royal Garde-Meuble, Baron Marc-Antoine Thierry de Ville-d'Avray, for 4,000 livres from Furet in the summer of 1784. The Garde-Meuble were responsible for the furnishings of the French royal household. Baron Ville-d'Avray placed the clock in his apartment on Place Louis XV. Marie Antoinette, the dauphin's mother, feared that the clock would spoil the six-year-old Louis, and it was given back to the Garde-Meuble. It had been displayed at the apartment of Marc-Antoine Thierry de Ville-d'Avray prior to its presentation to the dauphin. The clock was described as the 'Pendule dite La Négresse' ('Negress clock') in 1792 as part of the Cabinet of Machines at the Louvre. Following the French Revolution the clock was part of the Ministry of Finance until July 1796 and was sold on 15 Prairial Year 5 (in the French Republican calendar; 3 June 1797 in the Gregorian calendar) by the Board to the Commission of Subsistence to the dealers Brun, La Jarre et Cie with an estimated value of 10,000 francs. Brun and La Jarre had chosen the clock in exchange for the value of goods that they were owed by the French government.

Jean-Édouard, 5th Comte de Ribes bought the clock in 1937 from the Parisian antique dealer Koenigsberg. It was first formally identified as the clock that was part of the French royal collection when it was displayed at the Le Cabinet de l'Amateur exhibition at the Musée de l'Orangerie in 1956. At the time of its 1956 attribution the clock in the British royal collection had been believed to have been given by Louis XVI to Marie Antoinette. The Ribes clock was confirmed as the clock given to the dauphin by its signatures of Furet and Godon that matched the clock described by the Garde-Meuble in 1784.

The Ribes clock was auctioned at Sotheby's in Paris in December 2019 for €1.2 million, as part of the collection of Jacqueline de Ribes.

The clockmaker Robert Robin repaired the clock's musical functions in 1787, and it was repaired again with the addition of newer and longer songs in June 1791 prior to its presentation to the dauphin.
