= Florence May =

English pianist and biographer (1845 – 1923)

Florence May (1845 – 1923) was an English pianist who was the student and biographer of Johannes Brahms.

She was born 6 February 1845 in Deptford, London, daughter of music educator Edward Collett May and his wife, Mary. Initially trained by her father and uncle, she studied music with Clara Schumann in Lichtental, Vienna in 1871. While Schumann was on holiday, Brahms took over her training as a favour to Schumann, and May and her fellow pupil Nathalie Janotha remained with him after Schumann’s return.

Returning to England in 1873, she studied composition with George Macfarren and Woldemar Bargiel. She performed concert tours in Berlin in 1887 and Vienna in 1890 and 1896, as well as numerous concerts in England. In 1900 she was noted as 'a pianoforte player of considerable cultivation and power.'

She was viewed as an authority on Brahms, giving lectures on his compositions in London in March 1908, and writing a two-volume Life of Brahms (1905; 1948), which incorporates anecdotes of her own training with him and has had a long afterlife in Brahms scholarship. She also wrote a biographical work about Clara Schumann.

She died in London on 29 June 1923.

== Works ==
- (ed.) Pieces by old Masters, from Works written for the Harpsicord, selected, edited, and figured for the Pianoforte by Florence May (1878)
- Life of Brahms (1905; 1948)
- The Girlhood of Clara Schumann (1912)
