= The Bear Went Over the Mountain (song) =

Campfire song

Grizzly bear on a rock overlook

"The Bear Went Over the Mountain" is a campfire song sung to the tune of "For He's a Jolly Good Fellow", which, in turn, got its melody from the French tune "Malbrough s'en va-t-en guerre" (Marlborough is going to war).

The public domain lyrics are of unknown origin.

In 1950, the American folk singer Burl Ives recorded a popular version of the song for Columbia Records' children's division, which was released as a single and featured in his multi-record set The Animal Fair.

Bing Crosby included the song in a medley on his 1961 album 101 Gang Songs.

== Possible origin ==
The Deitsch folklorist Don Yoder postulates that the song may have its origins in Germanic traditions similar to Grundsaudaag, or Groundhog Day. In some German-speaking areas, foxes or bears were seen as weather prognosticators instead. The belief was that a bear would come out of his lair to check whether he could see "over the mountain". If the weather was clear, the bear would put an end to hibernation and demolish his lair. If it rained or snowed, however, he would return to his lair for six more weeks.

== See also ==
- For He's a Jolly Good Fellow
