= W. S. Rockstro =

English musicologist, teacher, pianist and composer

William Smith Rockstro (5 January 1823 – 1 July 1895) was an English musicologist, teacher, pianist and composer. He is best remembered for his books, including music textbooks, music history and biographies of famous musicians.

== Life and career ==
Rockstro was born William Smyth Rackstraw in North Cheam, Surrey. (He adopted an older form of his family name from 1846). He studied composition and piano with William Sterndale Bennett, organ with John Purkis, and from 1845 to 1846 he studied at the Leipzig Conservatory under Felix Mendelssohn (composition and piano). His contemporaries there included Joseph Joachim and Otto Goldschmidt. After his studies in Leipzig, Rockstro established himself as a teacher of piano and singing in London, and he secured a regular appointment as an accompanist at a recital series. In the early 1860s he moved to the West Country, where he lived for nearly 30 years.

Rockstro was an enthusiast for early music. In 1885 he conducted a concert of sacred music of the 16th and 17th centuries at the Royal Albert Hall. His own compositions, conservative in style, include operatic fantasias, short piano pieces, and songs. In 1886, he conducted his oratorio The Good Shepherd at the Three Choirs Festival, though it was not considered a success. The Times praised its obvious sincerity but complained of its conspicuous debt to Mendelssohn and its lack of good tunes.

Together with his former pupil J A Fuller Maitland, Rockstro collaborated on a collection, English Carols of the 15th Century (1891). As an editor of music of earlier centuries he was far from scholarly in his changes: The Times commented that his edition of the St Matthew Passion "introduced marks of expression in a wholesale fashion not likely to meet with the approval of purists". In 1891 he moved from the West Country back to London, where he taught both privately and at the Royal Academy of Music and the Royal College of Music.

Rockstro's later years were marred by ill health, but his death at the age of 72 was nonetheless sudden and unexpected. His brother was Richard Shepherd Rockstro (1826-1906), professor of flute at the Guildhall School of Music and author of A Treatise on the Flute (1890).

== Publications ==
Rockstro is best known for his books. Books about musical practice were A Key to Practical Harmony (1881), Practical Harmony: a Manual for the Use of Young Students (1881), and The Rules of Counterpoint Systematically Arranged for the Use of Young Students (1882). His books on musical history were A History of Music for the Use of Young Students (1879) and A General History of Music from the Infancy of the Greek Drama to the Present Period (1886). He published biographical studies of Handel (1883) and Mendelssohn (1884) and two books about Jenny Lind, Memoir of Madame Jenny Lind-Goldschmidt: her Early Art-Life and Dramatic Career, 1820–1851 (with H.S. Holland, 1891) and Jenny Lind, her Vocal Art and Culture (1894).

In the original Grove Dictionary of Music and Musicians Rockstro contributed 240 articles, including those on "Mass", "Monteverdi", "Motet", "Opera", "Oratorio", "Orchestra" and "Plainsong". Two articles by Rockstro remained, with revisions, in the online edition of Grove at May 2012: those on "Cadence" and "Aevia" (a technical word used in mediaeval service books).
