= Geneviève Poitrine =

French wet nurse

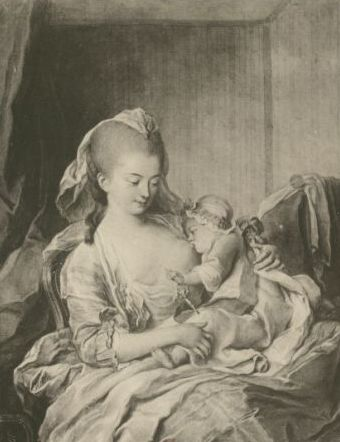
- Alleged portrait of Madame Poitrine, nurse of the first Dauphin by "A de Peters"
- Born: Geneviève Barbier c. 1750
- Other names: "Madame Poitrine" (Madame Chest)
- Occupation: Wet nurse
- Employer(s): King Louis XVI and Queen Marie Antoinette
- Spouse: M. Poitrine

Geneviève Poitrine, known as Madame Poitrine (c. 1750 – after 1783), was a wet nurse of the Dauphin of France, Louis Joseph, son of King Louis XVI and Queen Marie Antoinette. Poitrine was retrospectively accused of transmitting tuberculosis to the infant prince, thus inadvertently causing his death, aged seven years; this meant that his younger brother Louis Charles became heir apparent. The word poitrine translates to "chest" or "bosom", and her married name of Madame Poitrine was remarked upon by contemporaries as being appropriate for her duties.

== Biography ==
Geneviève Barbier was born in about 1750 into a peasant family. She married a gardener from Sceaux, and taking his name was thereafter known as Madame Poitrine. Poitrine is French for "chest" or "bosom", and this purported example of nominative determinism was remarked on during her lifetime. She was 31 years old when she took over the role in 1781. The previous wet nurse had been rejected after just six weeks because the young prince had developed a rash. The courtier and official Marie-Angélique de Bombelles recorded that the new nurse had a ...

predestined name - Madame Poitrine - who had large breasts and, according to doctors, excellent milk. Her rustic looks contrasted with the 'obsequious urbanity' of the courtiers.

Poitrine also reportedly:

... had the tone of a pomegranate, swore with great ease, and was neither surprised nor moved by anything. She accepted royal lace and linen without embarrassment, and only asked that she not be made to wear powder, because she had never used it. She wanted to wear her six hundred livres bonnet on her hair, like the courtiers. Her spoken tone and simple phraseology amused everyone.

Poitrine left her royal service in 1783, retiring with a pension of 6,000 livres, including 500 livres for each of her two daughters and 800 for her son. A portrait remains in the Bibliothèque nationale de France which is said to be of Madame Poitrine and by "A de Peters".

Poitrine was retrospectively accused of transmitting tuberculosis to the infant prince, thus inadvertently causing his death, aged seven years; this meant that his younger brother Louis Charles became heir apparent. (Note: Since it is unusual for pre-adolescent children to die from TB, it is possible that this accusation of transmitting tuberculosis was the result of a misdiagnosis as to the cause of the child's death.)

== Nursery rhyme / folk song populariser ==
It is said that Poitrine was the serendipitous key to the popularisation of the nursery rhyme/folk song "Marlbrough s'en va-t-en guerre" ("Marlbrough has left for the war"). She had learnt the 70-year-old song in her village and when Marie-Antoinette heard her singing to the infant Louis Joseph, she too learnt it and played it on the harpsichord. The courtiers naturally followed suit and thus the song became popular around the Palace of Versailles and across France.
