= Zaharakos Ice Cream Parlor =

Coordinates: 39°12′08″N 85°55′15″W

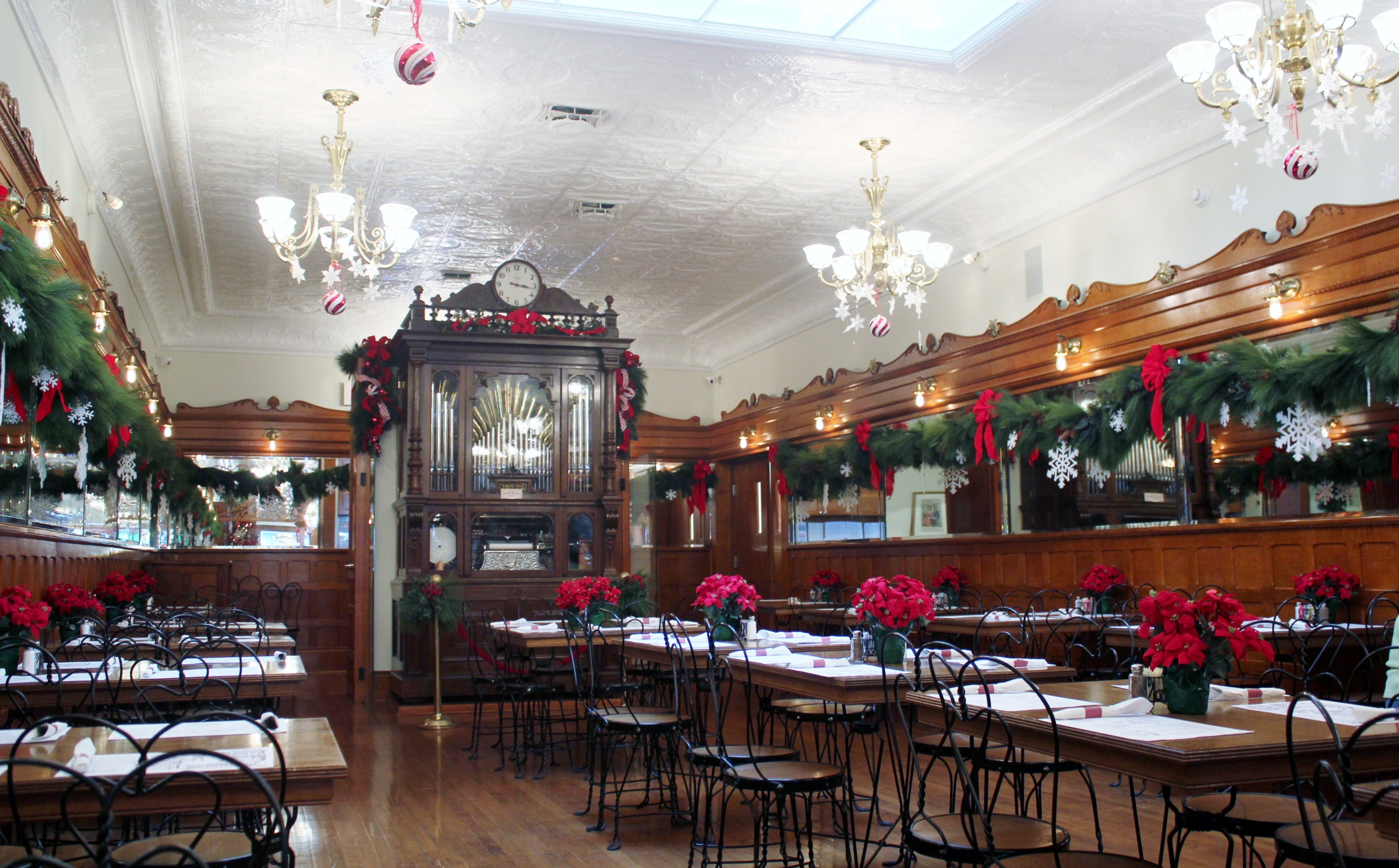
- Interactive map of Zaharakos Ice Cream Parlor

Restaurant information
- Location: Columbus, Columbus, Indiana, United States

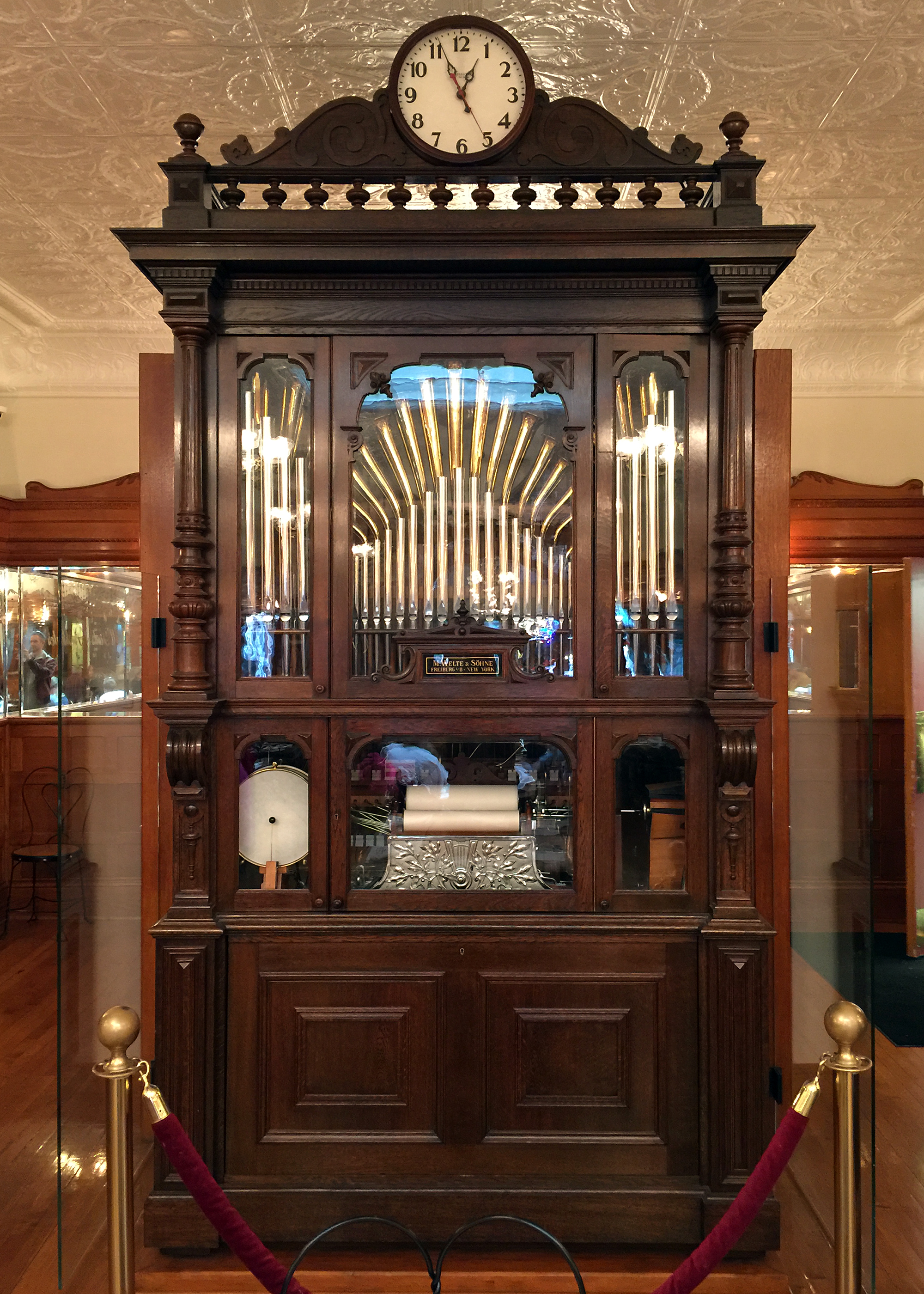
Zaharakos Orchestrion

Zaharakos Ice Cream Parlor is a restaurant in Columbus, Indiana.

== History ==
The restaurant was founded in 1900 by James, Lewis, and Pete Zaharako, three candymakers from Sparta, who opened it as a confectionary shop. After visiting the Louisiana Purchase Exposition, they added ice cream to their offerings. By the early 1910s, they had added soda fountains, a mahogany backbar, and a 1908 Welte orchestrion. By the middle of the century, there was a self-service area.

The restaurant closed in 2006 when the youngest generation of the Zaharako family weren't interested in continuing to run the business. The orchestrion was sold to a California collector.

In 2007, Tony Moravec, a local businessman, purchased and restored the restaurant, including purchasing the orchestrion from the collector who had bought it, at a total cost of $3.5 million and reopened it in 2009. The family living quarters above the shop were also restored, and Moravec also opened the space next door as a museum of 19th-century soda fountains and mechanical musical instruments. As of 2019, the orchestrion was the only one in the country available for the public to hear play. By 2013, the building had been named to the National Register of Historic Places.

Moravec died in 2022 and his son took over the business.

The restaurant is also known for its Gom Cheese Brr-grr, a type of sloppy joe or loose-meat sandwich with cheese.

The restaurant was used as the primary set for Robert Moniot's short film The Ice Cream Man about Ernst Cahn, a Jewish ice cream parlor owner in Amsterdam whose arrest sparked the February Strike.
