= John Purkis =

English organist (1781–1849)

John Purkis (1781 – 10 April 1849), was an English organist and teacher. He was blind at birth. A child prodigy, Purkis studied with Thomas Grenville (circa 1744–1827), also blind, and the organist at the Foundling Hospital in London. He became organist at St Margaret's Chapel at the age of nine, and then, aged 12, at St Olave Southwark, after a public competition and three day poll. His salary there was £30.

From 1804 until his death Purkis was organist at St Clement Danes, and also (after 1825) at St Peter's Walworth. He was consultant to the organ building firm Flight and Robinson during the construction of the Apollonicon a self-playing barrel organ, presented to the public for the first time in 1817. Over the next 21 years he performed popular Saturday afternoon recitals on the instrument at the firm's showroom, 101, St Martin's Lane. At the recitals Purkis often played fantasias on opera themes that were later published as piano pieces by William Hodsoll, and these became very popular with home pianists in the 1820s. Rachel Cowgill has called the Apollonicon recitals "virtually synonymous with the establishment of the public organ recital in England....the first to be held in a secular venue and run on a purely commercial basis".

Purkis was also a skilled violinist and harpist. With woodwind instrument maker Thomas Scott he formed the Scott & Purkis partnership to manufacture a double flageolet, taking out a patent in December 1805 for "an instrument on the flageolette principle, so constructed as a single instrument that two parts of a musical composition can be played thereon at the same time by one person". A tutorial book by Purkis was published. But rival William Bainbridge, inventor of the six finger-hole "improved English flageolet" in 1803, produced a more popular double flageolet, for which he was granted a patent in 1810.

In 1811 Purkis went through a series of operations, performed by Sir William Adams of Exeter, that gained him some limited sight. His pupils included the organist and music historian William Smith Rockstro. He died, aged 68, in April 1849.
