= Wellington's Victory =

1813 orchestral composition by Beethoven

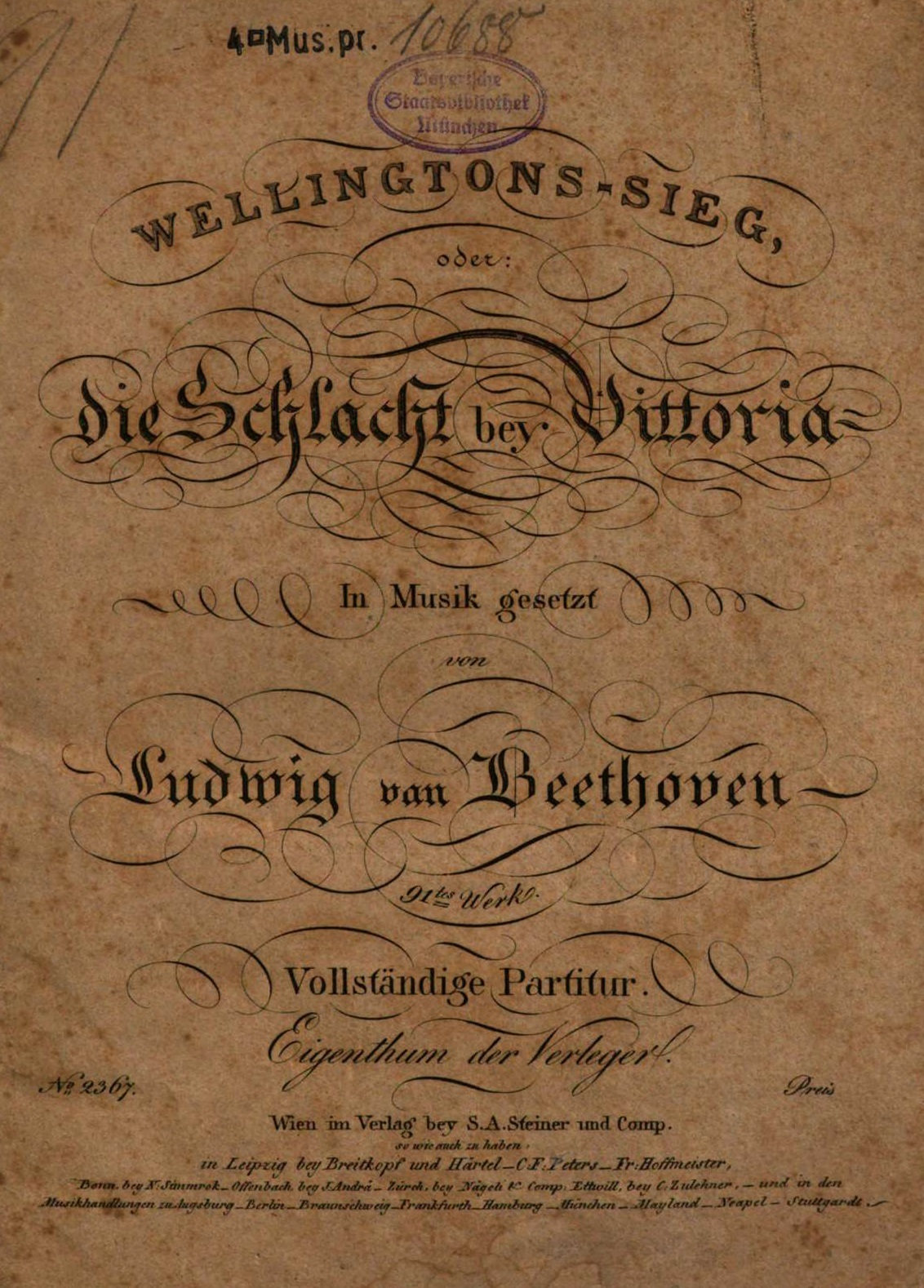
Title page of the first edition

Wellington's Victory, or the Battle of Vitoria (also called the Battle Symphony; in German: Wellingtons Sieg oder die Schlacht bei Vittoria), Op. 91, is a 15-minute-long orchestral work composed by Ludwig van Beethoven to commemorate the Marquess (later Duke) of Wellington's victory over Joseph Bonaparte at the Battle of Vitoria in Spain on 21 June 1813 and the German campaign of 1813 in Germany thus ending the rule of Bonaparte's Confederation of the Rhine and the birth of the German Confederation. It was dedicated to the Prince Regent, later King George IV. Composition stretched from August to first week of October 1813, and the piece proved to be a substantial moneymaker for Beethoven.

The autograph of the work is preserved in the Berlin State Library.

== Composition, premiere and reception ==
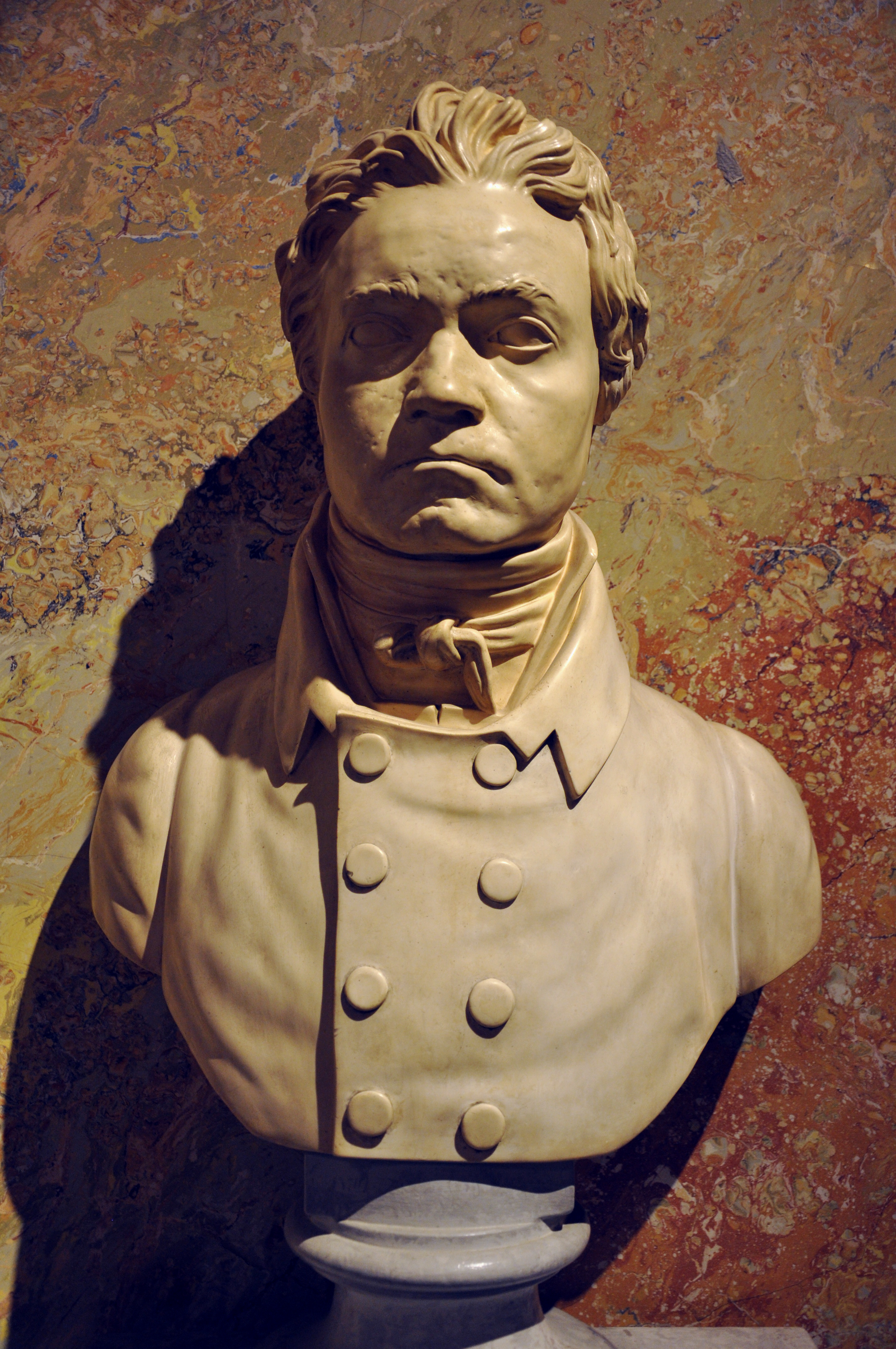
Bust of the composer (1812)

After the Battle of Vitoria, Beethoven's friend Johann Nepomuk Maelzel talked him into writing a composition commemorating this battle that he could notate on his 'mechanical orchestra', the panharmonicon, a contraption that was able to play many of the military band instruments of the day. However, Beethoven wrote a composition for large band (100 musicians), so large that Maelzel could not build a machine large enough to perform the music. As an alternative, Beethoven rewrote the Siegessinfonie for orchestra, added a first part and renamed the work Wellington's Victory.

The piece was first performed in Vienna on 8 December 1813 at a concert to benefit Austrian and Bavarian soldiers wounded at the Battle of Hanau, with Beethoven conducting. It was immediately popular with concertgoers. Also on the programme were the premiere of his Symphony No. 7 and a work performed by Maelzel's mechanical trumpeter.

This performance, which featured 100 musicians, has been noted as being particularly loud. Corinna da Fonseca-Wollheim described it as a "sonic assault on the listener" and the "beginning of a musical arms race for ever louder... symphonic performance", quoting an unnamed attendee as remarking that the performance was "seemingly designed to make the listener as deaf as its composer". The musicologist Frédéric Döhl described performances of the work as "not like an evening at the Berlin Philharmonie, but rather like a modern-day rock concert".

== Orchestration ==
Wellington's Victory is something of a musical novelty. The full orchestration calls for two flutes, one piccolo, two oboes, two clarinets, two bassoons, four horns, six trumpets, three trombones, timpani, a large percussion battery (including muskets and other artillery sound effects), and a string section of violins I and II, violas, cellos, and double basses.

In the orchestral percussion section one player plays the timpani, the other three play the cymbals, bass drum and triangle. On stage there are two 'sides', British and French, both playing the same instruments: two side drums (englisches/französisches Trommeln in the score), two bass drums (Kanone in the score), two (four) ratchets, played by eight to ten instrumentalists.

== Structure ==
The work has two parts: the Battle (Schlacht) and the Victory Symphony (Sieges Sinfonie). The first part is programme music describing two approaching opposing armies and contains extended passages depicting scenes of battle. It uses "Rule Britannia" for the British side and "Malbrough s'en va-t-en guerre" ("Marlborough has left for the war", also popularized today as "For He's a Jolly Good Fellow") for the French side. Beethoven may have elected to not use "La Marseillaise" to represent the French forces, as Tchaikovsky later did in the 1812 Overture, perhaps because playing "La Marseillaise" was considered treasonous in Vienna at the time.

If this first part is pictorial music, the second is far from vulgar and exhibits some typical Beethoven composing techniques. It can be considered as a sonata form that, stripped of the development section, features an extended coda. The first theme is a fanfare in D major, which switches to the distant key of B♭ major for the second theme. (Note: For similar key shifts see for instance the Missa Solemnis, the 9th symphony and many other mature works by Beethoven.) This is "God Save the King", the British national anthem:

However, the final cadence (bars marked E in the score above) is not played. Instead, motif D is repeated so as to switch back to D major and to the re-exposition of the fanfare theme. This is followed by the re-exposition of "God Save the King", now in the main key (D major) and adopting the pace of a "Tempo di menuetto moderato". Again the final cadence (E) is avoided and replaced by successive repetition of motif D, this time leading to a coda in imitative style. This fugal section ("Allegro") starts as a string octet (later joined by the full orchestra) with the phrase

stemming from phrase A of the "God Save the King" tune. Later a second phrase joins in, still in imitative style,

derived from the anthem's phrase B, thus building up a little double fugue. It all ends with a section based on motif

(which reworks motifs C+D of the original theme) and at last by a final derivative of phrase A:

== The panharmonicon ==
The first version of "Wellington's Victory" was not written for an orchestra. Mälzel, known today primarily for patenting the metronome, convinced Beethoven to write a short piece commemorating Wellington's victory for his invention, the panharmonicon. It never caught on as anything more than a curiosity. Nonetheless, Mälzel toured Europe showing off Beethoven's work on the mechanical trumpeter and the enthusiasm for the music convinced Beethoven to turn it into a full-blown "victory overture".

The manuscript of the second part of this version was discovered by Willy Hess in a revised copy by the author (Hess 108).

== The composition today ==
The popularity of Wellington's Victory has waned over time, and the work is not performed often today. Many critics lump it into a category of so-called "battle pieces", along with Tchaikovsky's 1812 Overture and Liszt's Hunnenschlacht (Battle of the Huns). The American music critic Charles Rosen wrote that the work "lacks the serious pretentiousness or the incorporation of ideology" of Felix Mendelssohn's Reformation Symphony or Hector Berlioz's Symphonie funèbre et triomphale. Beethoven was well aware of the triviality of the work and responded to similar criticism in his own time: "What I shit is better than anything you could ever think up!"

In their book Men of Music, Wallace Brockway and Herbert Weinstock termed the piece an "atrocious potboiler".

== Sources ==
- Rosen, Charles (1971). The Classical Style. London: Faber & Faber. OCLC 1029266214.
