= The Ice Cream Man (2024 film) =

2024 Dutch short film

- Film poster
- Directed by: Robert Moniot
- Written by: Robert Moniot
- Produced by: Greg Malone; San Fu Maltha; Robert Moniot; Gregor Wilson
- Starring: Noah Emmerich; Nik Pajic; Gretchen Hall; Derek de Lint
- Cinematography: Jim Timperman
- Edited by: Robert Moniot
- Music by: Nami Melumad
- Production company: Big Picture Entertainment
- Release date: 25 July 2024 (Indy Shorts International Film Festival)
- Running time: 33 minutes
- Country: Netherlands
- Language: English

The Ice Cream Man is a 2024 short biographical drama film written, produced, edited, and directed by Robert Moniot. It stars Noah Emmerich as Ernst Cahn, an ice cream parlor owner, who is targeted by Klaus Barbie, also known as the Butcher of Lyon, after the Nazi invasion of the Netherlands during World War II. The film premiered at the Indy Shorts International Film Festival in July 2024.

== Cast ==
- Noah Emmerich as Ernst Cahn
- Nik Pajic as Klaus Barbie
- Gretchen Hall as Ursula Cahn
- Derek de Lint as Father Jan
- Madison Pullins as Inge Cahn
- Meghan Reinertsen as Helga Cahn
- Jordy Tulleners as Simon Groen

== Production ==
=== Casting ===
Robert Moniot wanted Noah Emmerich for the lead role. According to Moniot, "It turns out Noah's father and aunt, with their parents, just like the Cahn family, fled Nazi Germany in 1936 and moved to Amsterdam because everyone assumed it would be neutral. They lived around the corner from the Cahn family and the ice cream parlor. There's some evidence that they actually knew them. Noah's aunt was classmates with Anne Frank. So, Noah was like, 'I'm in.'"

=== Filming ===
Filming took place in the Netherlands and Indiana, United States, including the Zaharakos Ice Cream Parlor in Columbus. According to Moniot, "We got to shoot most of the Amsterdam scenes and the scenes in The Hague at the actual locations where the events that took place really happened, on the Waterlooplein, inside the prison where Ernst was being held. That's the actual jail where he was held. In fact, the actual cell in the movie is the only cell that the Dutch preserved from World War II."

== Accolades ==
The Ice Cream Man won the Indiana Spotlight Audience Choice Award at the Indy Shorts International Film Festival. The film also won the Grand Jury Award for Narrative Shorts at the 18th Gasparilla International Film Festival. It was shortlisted for Best Live Action Short Film at the 97th Academy Awards, but was not nominated.
