= Louis Joseph, Dauphin of France =

French royal dauphin (1781–1789)

Louis Joseph
- Dauphin of France
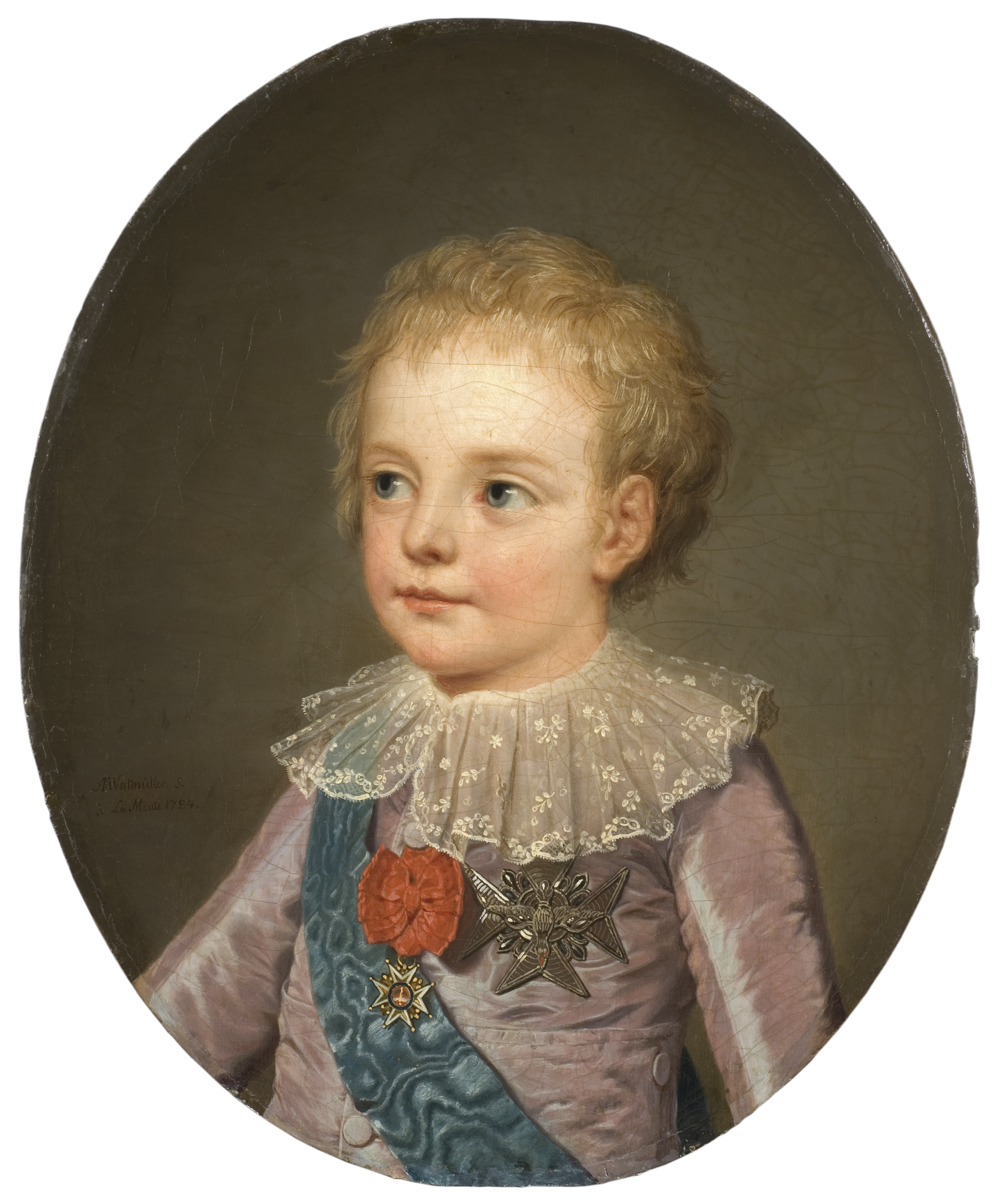
- Portrait by Adolf Ulrik Wertmüller, 1784. (Nationalmuseum)
- Born: 22 October 1781; Palace of Versailles, France
- Died: 4 June 1789 (aged 7); Château de Meudon, France
- Burial: Basilica of Saint-Denis
Names
- Louis-Joseph Xavier François de France
- House: Bourbon
- Father: Louis XVI
- Mother: Marie Antoinette

Louis Joseph (Louis Joseph Xavier François; 22 October 1781 – 4 June 1789) was Dauphin of France as the second child and first son of King Louis XVI and Marie Antoinette. As son of a king of France, he was a fils de France ("Child of France"). Louis Joseph died aged seven from tuberculosis and was succeeded as Dauphin (and thus heir-apparent) by his four-year-old brother Louis Charles.

== Biography ==
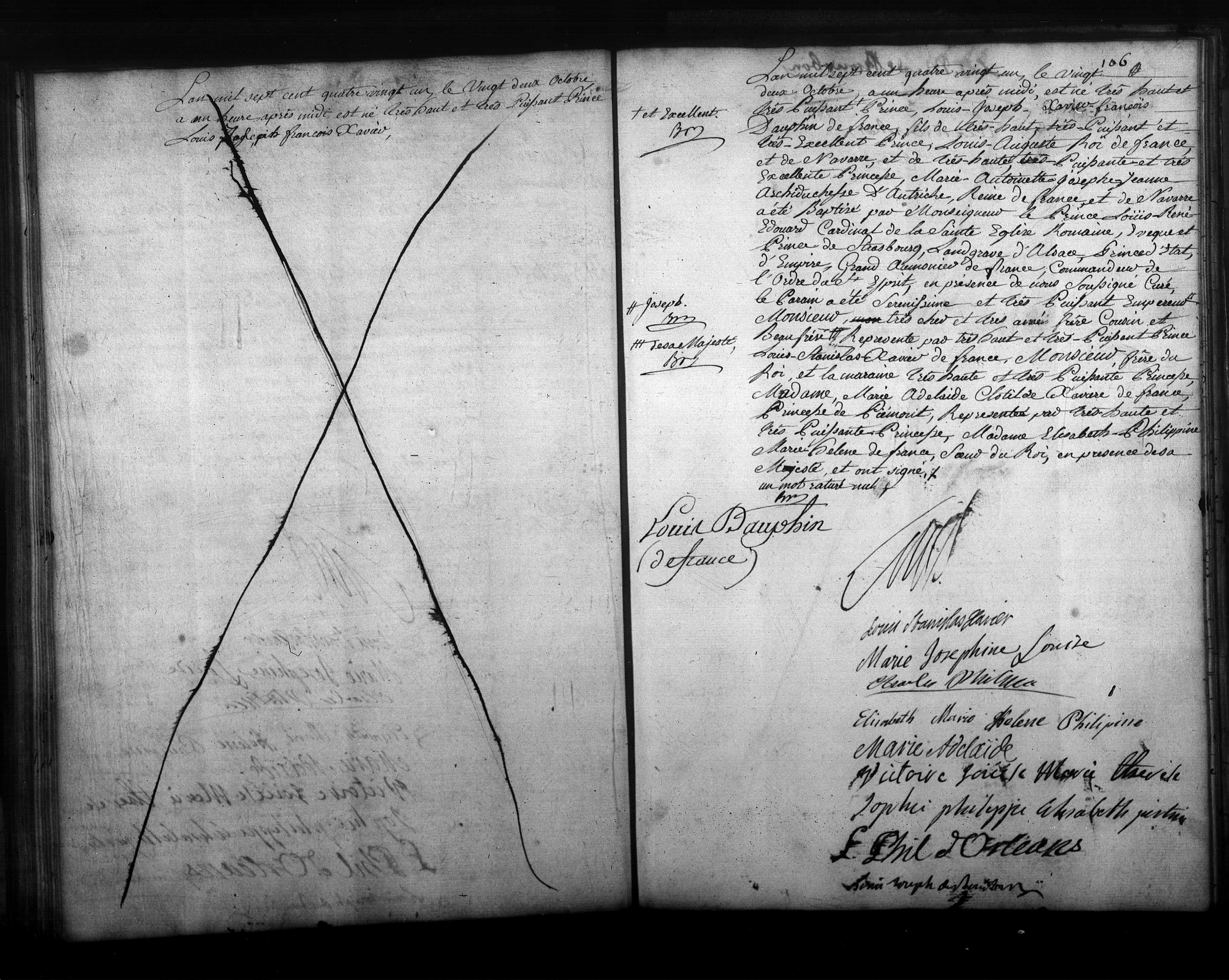
Birth certificate of Louis Joseph Xavier François.

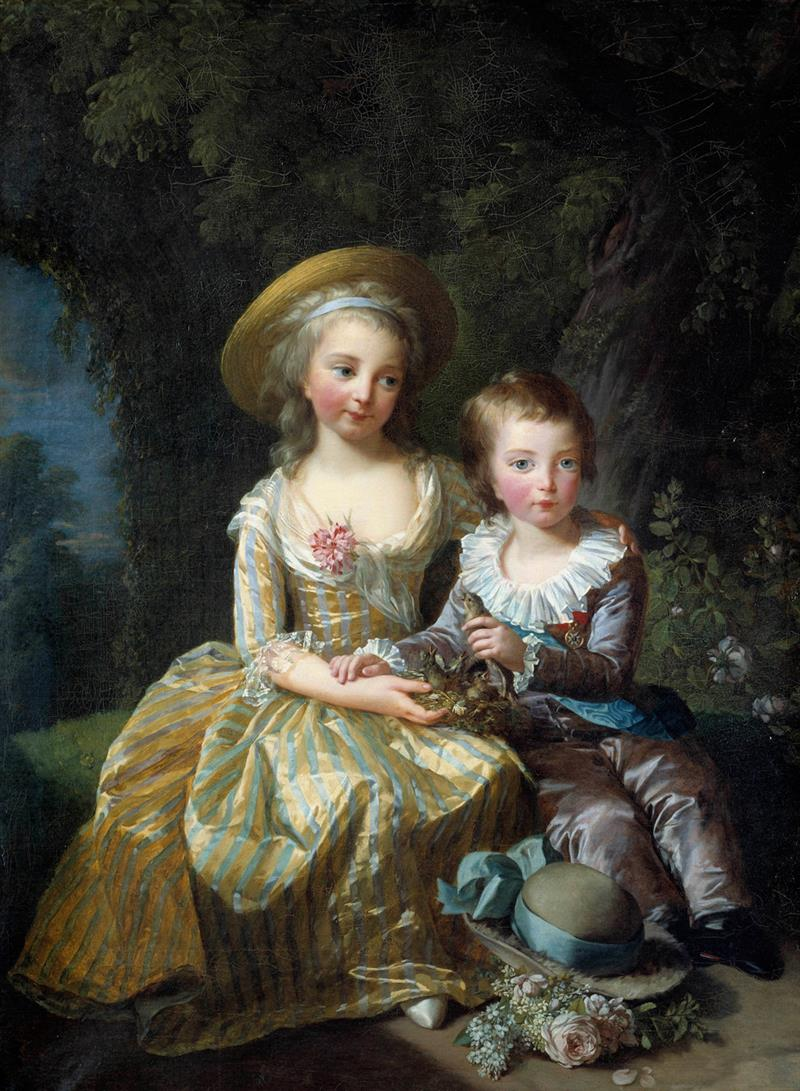
Louis Joseph with his sister Marie Thérèse in 1784 (by Vigée-Lebrun)

Louis Joseph Xavier François de France was born at the Palace of Versailles on 22 October 1781. He was baptized on the day of his birth, in the chapel of the Palace of Versailles by Louis René Édouard de Rohan, Grand Chaplain of France, in the presence of Honoré Nicolas Brocquevielle, priest of Notre Dame de Versailles: his godfather was Emperor Joseph II of Austria, represented by Louis Stanislas Xavier, Comte de Provence and his godmother was Marie Clotilde of France, princess of Piedmont, represented by Élisabeth, younger sister of King Louis XVI. The newborn was the long-awaited Dauphin, his father's heir to the throne of France, as Salic Law, which excluded women from acceding to the throne, applied to his elder sister, Marie Thérèse Charlotte, Madame Royale. The birth of Louis Joseph put an end to the hopes of his uncle, the comte de Provence, of succeeding his brother Louis XVI. His private household was created upon his birth. He was under the care of Victoire de Rohan, the Governess of the Children of France, until she was replaced in 1782 by Yolande de Polastron, duchesse de Polignac, one of his mother's favourites. His sous-gouverneur was the Maréchal de camp Antoine Charles Augustin d'Allonville. His wet nurse was Geneviève Poitrine, who was later accused of transmitting tuberculosis to the young Dauphin.

Louis Joseph was very close to his sister and to his parents, who watched attentively over his education. He was always praised for being a very bright child for his age; however, it soon became apparent that he was of fragile health.

=== Illness ===
Around April 1784, when he was three years old, Louis Joseph had a series of high fevers. Out of fear for his health, he was transported to the Château de La Muette where the air was reputed to have healing properties. The time spent at La Muette seemed to have helped Louis Joseph recover, and almost a year later, in March 1785, he returned there and was inoculated against smallpox. However, his health remained fragile.

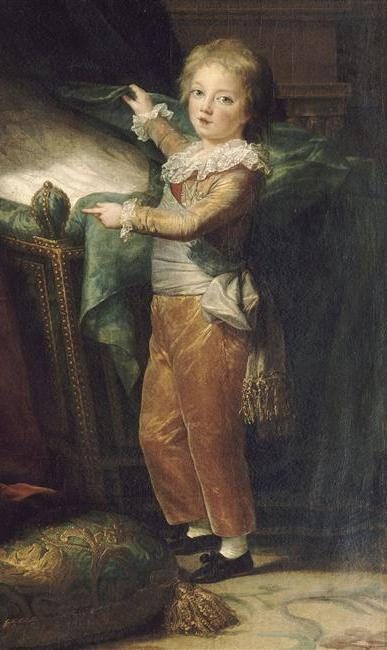
Louis Joseph in 1787 (detail of Marie Antoinette and Her Children by Élisabeth Vigée Le Brun)

In 1786, the fevers returned, but his household regarded them as being of no importance. These fevers, however, were the first signs of tuberculosis. In the same year, Louis Joseph's education was turned over to men, as was customary for the sons of the kings of France. At the ceremony, it was noted that Louis Joseph had trouble walking, which was in fact caused by a curvature of the spine – something which was treated through the use of metal corsets. By January 1788 the fevers grew more frequent and the disease progressed quickly.

Louis Joseph died at 1:00 a.m. at Château de Meudon on June 4, 1789 in the presence of his mother and grandaunts. He was seven and a half and passed during the Estates General, 40 days before the storming of the Bastille. He was the last prince to live in the castle. For five years, Louis Joseph had been battling what appeared to be a form of smallpox. He died in his mother's arms shortly after midnight. His father, who had been at his bedside on the previous day, had returned to Versailles the afternoon before his son's death to meet with a political delegation. Louis Joseph was buried on 13 June in a simple ceremony at the Basilica of St Denis, a month before the storming of the Bastille. On 10 August 1793, on order of the National Convention during the Reign of Terror, his tomb was desecrated, together with those of the kings and queens of France, members of the royal family, high dignitaries, and abbots.

At the death of Louis Joseph, the title of Dauphin passed to his younger brother Louis Charles, Duke of Normandy (1785–1795), who died during the French Revolution, at the Temple prison in Paris.

== Legacy ==
Dauphin County, Pennsylvania, in which Harrisburg is located, is named after him. The Pennsylvania legislature, meeting in Philadelphia in 1785, named the newly formed county northwest of Lancaster and north of York to thank France for helping the United States win its independence from the British Empire. Within the county, the borough of Dauphin, so named when it was incorporated in 1845, is thus indirectly also named for him.

== In popular culture ==
Louis Joseph appears in the historical fiction manga The Rose of Versailles.

== Ancestry ==
Ancestors of Louis Joseph of France

8. Louis XV of France
4. Louis, Dauphin of France
9. Marie Leszczyńska
2. Louis XVI of France
10. Augustus III of Poland
5. Maria Josepha of Saxony
11. Maria Josepha of Austria
1. Louis Joseph of France
12. Leopold, Duke of Lorraine
6. Francis I, Holy Roman Emperor
13. Élisabeth Charlotte d'Orléans
3. Marie Antoinette of Austria
14. Charles VI, Holy Roman Emperor
7. Empress Maria Theresa
15. Elisabeth Christine of Brunswick

== Bibliography ==
History of Dauphin County, Pennsylvania Historical Commission, Harrisburg, Pennsylvania

Louis Joseph, Dauphin of France Bourbons of France Cadet branch of the Capetian dynasty Born: 22 October 1781 Died: 4 June 1789
French royalty
Vacant Title last held by Louis Auguste	Dauphin of France; 22 October 1781 – 4 June 1789	Succeeded by Louis Charles
