= Dietrich Nikolaus Winkel =

Inventor of the metronome (1777–1826)

Dietrich Nikolaus Winkel (1777 – 28 September 1826) was the inventor of the first successful metronome. He also invented the componium, an "automatic instrument" that could make endless variations on a musical theme.

Winkel was born in Lippstadt, settled in Amsterdam shortly after 1800, and in 1814, while experimenting with pendulums, he discovered that a pendulum weighted on both sides of the pivot could beat steady time, even for the slow tempos often used in European classical music. Winkel donated the first model of his musical 'chronometer', dated 27 November 1814, to the Hollandsch Instituut van Wetenschappen, Letterkunde en Schoone Kunsten in Amsterdam. Unfortunately he did not appropriately protect his idea, and by 1816, Johann Nepomuk Mälzel (sometimes 'Maelzel') added a Scale to the Instrument and patented it as the Mälzel Metronome, which remains in use to this day. Thus, even today Mälzel often incorrectly receives credit for what was rightly Winkel's creation. The original model is preserved in a Dutch museum.

Winkel's death was announced this:

"AMSTERDAM. On the 28th September died in this city, M. Winkel, well known for his skill in mechanical science, particularly as applied to music. As a proof of his talents, we need only mention the Componium, or Musical Improvisatore*, which excited great interest amongst connoisseurs, particularly at Paris. Several other specimens of musical mechanism do honour to his talents; but in private life he was modest, and others often obtained credit for inventions which M. Winkel might justly have claimed. The Metronome, usually called Maelzel's, ought to bear the name of Winkel, for the original idea was his; although it is true that Maelzel brought to perfection the instrument which was invented by the Dutch mechanic. —Revue Encyclopedique."

Extensive discussions on the topic of whether Mälzel stole Winkel's intellectual property can be found in the German musical Letters of the time and since. For example:

A German text (would need translation) from 1845 reads:

"In Deutschland erwarben sich um diese Erfindung Bürja in Berlin, Weisske in Meissen und hauptsächlich Stockei in Burg 1801 Verdienst.

Des letztem Erfindung verbesserte der berühmte Mechaniker Mälzel in Wien, dessen Ruhm jedoch Winkel in Amsterdam streitig machte, indem er sich für den Erfinder dieses Instruments, von nun an Mälzel's Metronom genannt, ausgab.

Dieser Metronom besteht aus einem metallenem Pendel, an dem sich ein verschiebbares, mit einer Schraube zum Feststellen versehenes Bleigewicht, der Regulator, befindet. Man hat nun diesen Pendel sowohl einfach freihängend, als auch durch ein Uhrwerk getrieben, in welchem letztern Falle er, wie sich von selbst versteht, bedeutend kostspieliger ist*, und den Zweck aus Gründen, auf die wir später zurükkommen, nicht besser erfüllt als der einfache. Der Pendel selbst ist in Grade getheilt, die die Zahlen von 50—160"

Another text (in 1870) wrote of the metronome.

Er wurde von dem Mechaniker Winkel in Amsterdam erfunden, von dem Hofmaschinisten Mälzel zu Wien, geboren zu Regensburg, der unrechtmäßiger Weise auch die Ehre der Erfindung für sich in Anspruch nahm, verfertigt und in Umlauf gesetzt. tr. It was invented by the mechanic Winkel in Amsterdam, by the court machinist Mälzel of Vienna, born in Regensburg, who unlawfully claimed the honor of the invention for himself, manufactured it and put it into circulation.
