= Apollonicon =

The Apollonicon was a self-acting barrel organ, built by the English organ builders Flight & Robson in London and presented to the public the first time in 1817. Said to have been the biggest barrel and finger organ ever built, it was an automatic playing machine with about 1,900 pipes and 45 organ stops. It was inspired by Johann Nepomuk Mälzel's Panharmonikon. The instrument also had five keyboards, one of them used as the pedal keyboard, so it could be played by several players in manual mode as well.

A prototype for the machine was made by Flight & Robson in 1811 at the request of Lord Kirkwall, under the direction of the Earl's protégé, the blind organist John Purkis. (Purkis has previously composed at least one piece for the Panharmonikon). Impromptu demonstrations of this machine at 101 St Martin's Lane (the firm's showrooms) attracted thousands of people. The instrument was installed at Kirkwall's London home in Charles Street, Berkeley Square, where it impressed the Prince Regent (later King George IV) at a dinner party in 1813.

The success persuaded Flight & Robson to build a much larger self-playing machine, the Appollonicon, in 1817. Purkis performed regular Saturday afternoon recitals on the instrument at St Martin's Lane for the next 21 years. Rachel Cowgill has called the Apollonicon recitals as "virtually synonymous with the establishment of the public organ recital in England....the first to be held in a secular venue and run on a purely commercial basis".

The St Martin's Lane lease expired in 1845 and the Apollonicon was dismantled and re-assembled at the Music Hall in the Strand. In the 1860s it was extended with a sixth console and moved again, to the Royal Music Hall, Lowther Arcade, off the Strand, in 1868. The instrument was sold in 1881 and scrapped, though parts of it were rumoured to have been repurposed in the organs of Boldre Parish Church & Bishop's Hull Parish Church in Somerset.

A very detailed description with drawings can be found in the Mechanics Magazine from 1828. A notice about it is to be found in Polytechnisches Journal, 1828, with the Germanized name Apollonikon.
