= Johann Nepomuk Maelzel =

German inventor (1772–1838)

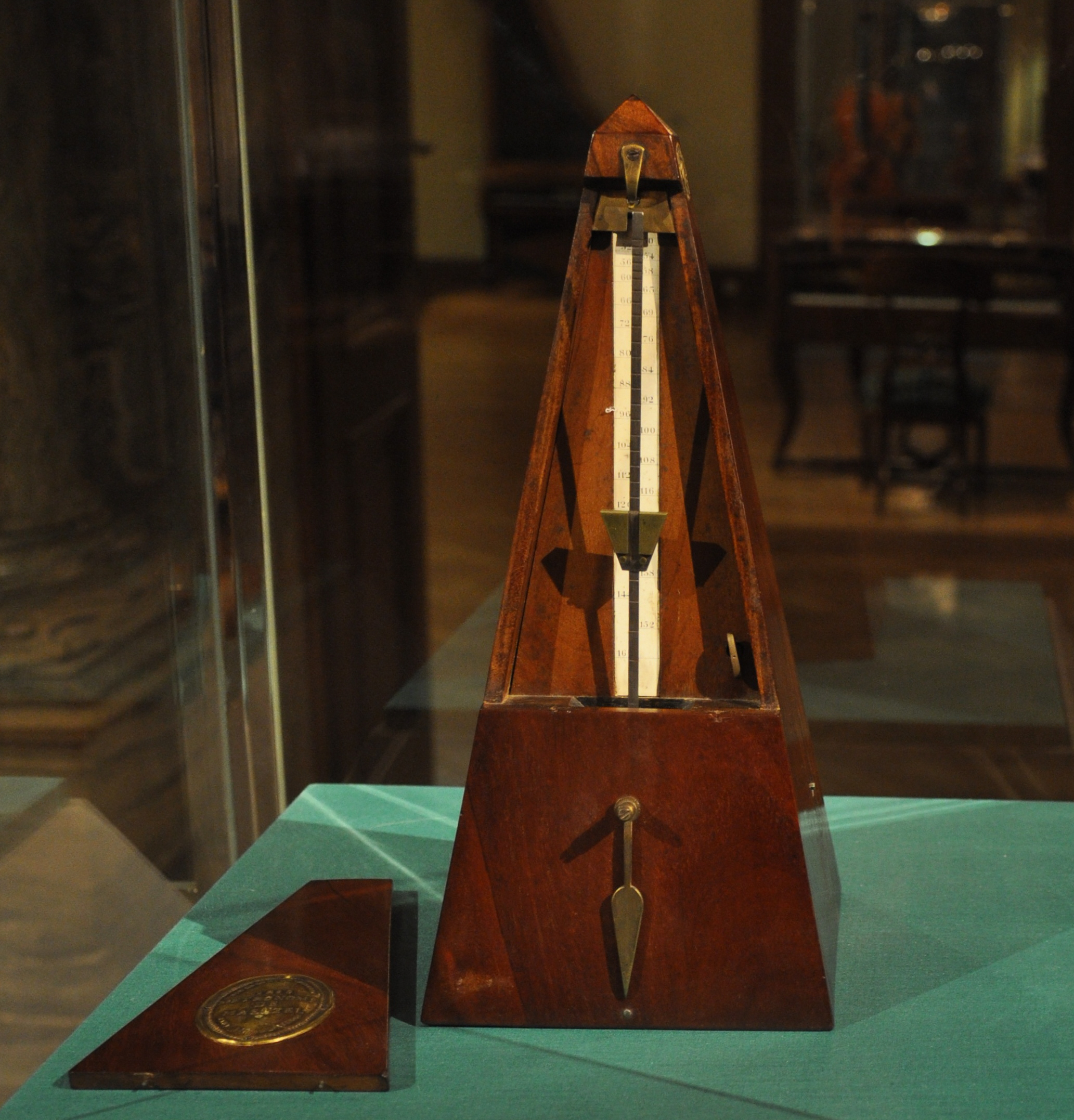
A metronome by Maelzel, Paris, 1815

Johann Nepomuk Maelzel (or Mälzel; August 15, 1772 – July 21, 1838) was a German inventor, engineer, and showman, best known for reverse engineering the metronome that Dietrich Nikolaus Winkel invented and mass producing it. As for several music-playing automatons as well as displaying the Mechanical Turk chess machine. He worked with Beethoven to compose a piece of music for one of his inventions.

== Life and work ==
Maelzel was born in Regensburg. The son of an organ builder, he received a comprehensive musical education. He moved to Vienna in 1792. After several years' study and experiment, he produced an orchestrion instrument, which was publicly exhibited and afterward sold for 3,000 florins. In 1804, he invented the panharmonicon, an automaton able to play the musical instruments of a military band, powered by bellows and directed by revolving cylinders storing the notes. This attracted universal attention; the inventor became noted throughout Europe, was appointed imperial court-mechanician at Vienna, and drew the admiration of Ludwig van Beethoven and other noted composers. This instrument was sold to a Parisian admirer for 120,000 francs.

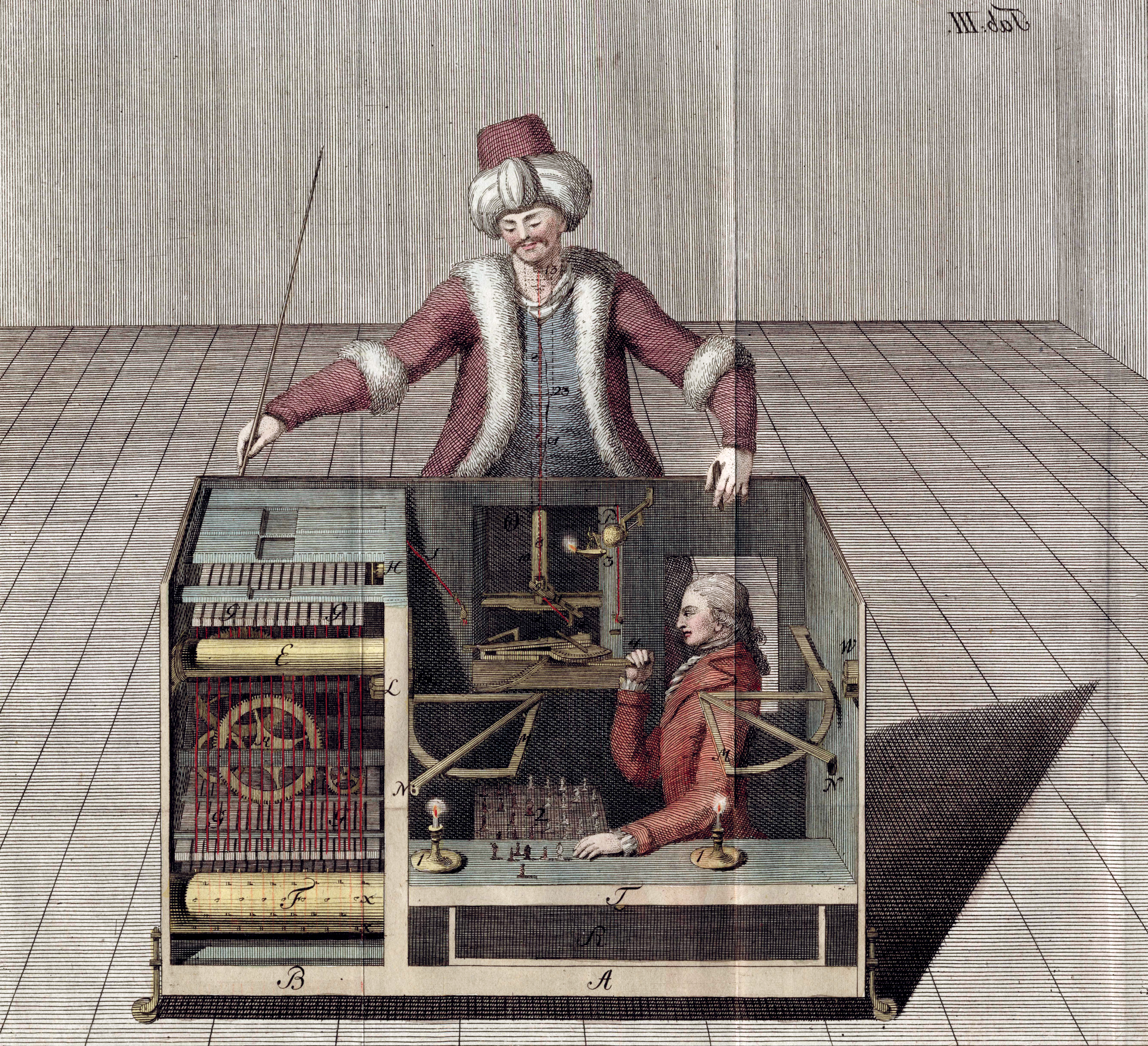
von Kempelen's Chess Turk

In 1805 Maelzel purchased Wolfgang von Kempelen's half-forgotten automaton chess player, The Turk, took it to Paris, and sold it to Eugene Beauharnais at a large profit. Returning to Vienna, he gave his attention to the construction of an automaton trumpeter, which, with lifelike movements and sudden changes of attire, performed French and Austrian field signals and military airs. In 1808 he invented an improved ear trumpet and a musical chronometer.

In 1813 Maelzel and Beethoven were on familiar terms. Maelzel conceived and musically sketched Wellington's Victory, or The Battle of Vitoria, for which Beethoven composed the music to be played on Maelzel's 'mechanical orchestra', the panharmonicon; they also gave several concerts, at which Beethoven's symphonies were interspersed with the performances of Maelzel's automatons. In 1814, Beethoven wrote a deposition claiming that Maelzel had defrauded him, claiming ownership of this music and illegally staging performances of it from an inaccurate transcription. Beethoven described Maelzel in this deposition as "a rude, churlish man, entirely devoid of education or cultivation".

In 1816 Maelzel became established in Paris as manufacturer of a metronome. Maelzel's metronome was copied from a metronome invented earlier by Dietrich Nikolaus Winkel. By 1817, Beethoven and Maelzel appear to have reconciled. Beethoven wrote glowingly of Maelzel's metronome and declared he would stop using traditional tempo indications like allegro.

Maelzel left Paris for Munich in 1817 and then again took up his abode in Vienna. At this time he found means to repurchase von Kempelen's chess player, and, after spending several preparatory years in constructing and improving a number of mechanical inventions, he formed an enterprise devoted to exhibiting his array of mechanical wonders in the New World.

He died on a ship in the harbor of La Guaira, Venezuela, reportedly from alcohol poisoning.

== Quotations ==
Maelzel was not always viewed kindly by his contemporaries:

- Maelzel will be especially remembered ... by the Metronome. ...
  As a man, Maelzel seems to have been quarrelsome, extravagant, and unscrupulous. ... Had he possessed a larger amount of culture and of conscience, he might have done service to high Art.

— The Year-book of facts in science and art (1856)
