= St. Anne's Road Pocket Park =

Community park in Dublin, Ireland

St Anne's Road Pocket Park
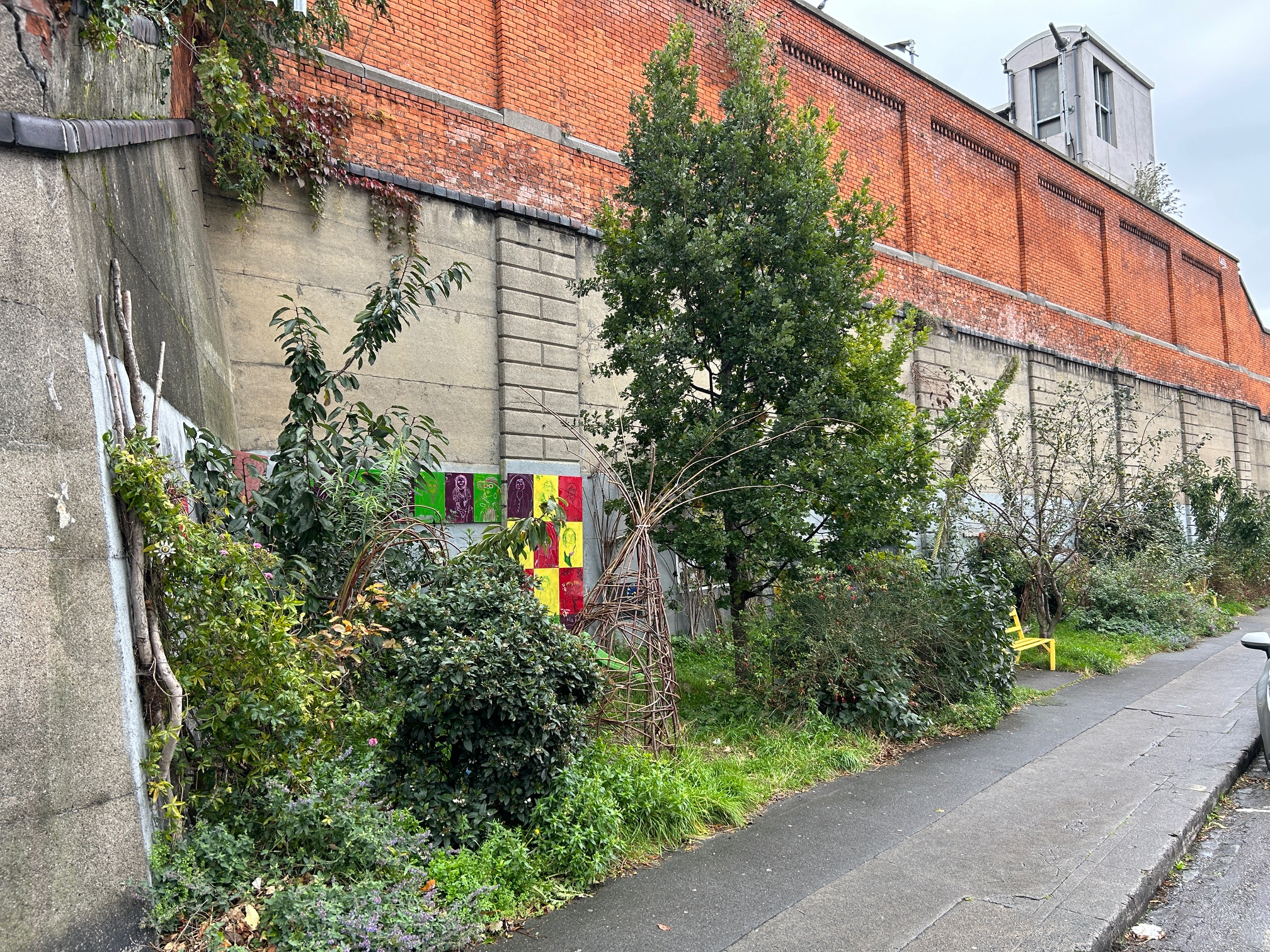
- The park in November 2023
- Interactive map of St Anne's Road Pocket Park
- Type: Community
- Location: St. Anne's Road, Drumcondra, Ireland
- Coordinates: 53.3630°N 6.2590°W
- Area: 0.030 acres (0.01 ha)
- Created: March 2016; 10 years ago
- Operator: Dublin City Council and volunteers
- Open: All year
- Website: www.stannesroadpocketpark.com

St Anne's Road Pocket Park (Irish: Páirc Phóca Bóthar Naomh Anna) is a micro-pocket park measuring 120 square metres (0.03 acres) located off St Anne's Road in the northside Dublin, Ireland suburb of Drumcondra. It is a community project, and a member of Dublin City Council's Public Participation Network (PPN).

== Layout ==
The park, measuring 40 metres in length and between six metres and one metre wide, is south-facing, backed by the wall of Drumcondra railway station to the north.

== History and development ==
The idea for the pocket park was conceived by Jen Martin, a resident of St Anne's Road, in 2014. At that time the narrow, triangular space had been used as a space for "little more than public urination", set as it is off the main Dorset Street - Drumcondra corridor and in the broad vicinity of Croke Park stadium, in an area which sees high volumes of pedestrian traffic at times.

The location had previously been suggested as a site for a bottle bank, but this idea had been turned down some years before. Martin applied for, and received, a grant from the Croke Park Community Fund in January 2014, the proceeds from which employed landscape architect Sophie von Maltzan to help the community to develop the corner into something which could be more beneficial to the neighbourhood.

The park was largely built in spring 2016 by the Drumcondra community, and opened in March 2016. Siobhan Maher, Dublin City Council's Public-Realm Strategy Project Manager, helped to facilitate the project. There is no concrete or other hard landscaping in the park, and in the early stage, all play elements in the park were built from a beech tree which had fallen in a previous winter storm.

Speaking in February 2020, Maher said "While there used to be issues with antisocial behaviour in the space, it’s been transformed into a very cared for, positive space in the area". Another user of the park considered it a "beautiful example of how human culture and wildlife habitat can co-exist happily in even the smallest patch of urban land".

=== Usage and reaction ===
Some residents have commented on the positive role the park played during the COVID-19 pandemic, allowing a place for them to meet neighbours at an outdoor focal point and for new arrivals to settle in to the area. Local residents have commended the park, even though it is small, for its open space, biodiversity and for allowing an area for people to enjoy nature in a city centre environment. At Christmas time, the park has been decorated with lights, and every year the residents throw a "birthday party" for the park. Community volunteers held many events in the park, from Cruinniú na nÓg to Culture Night and creative environmental events for the local schools.

== Biodiversity ==
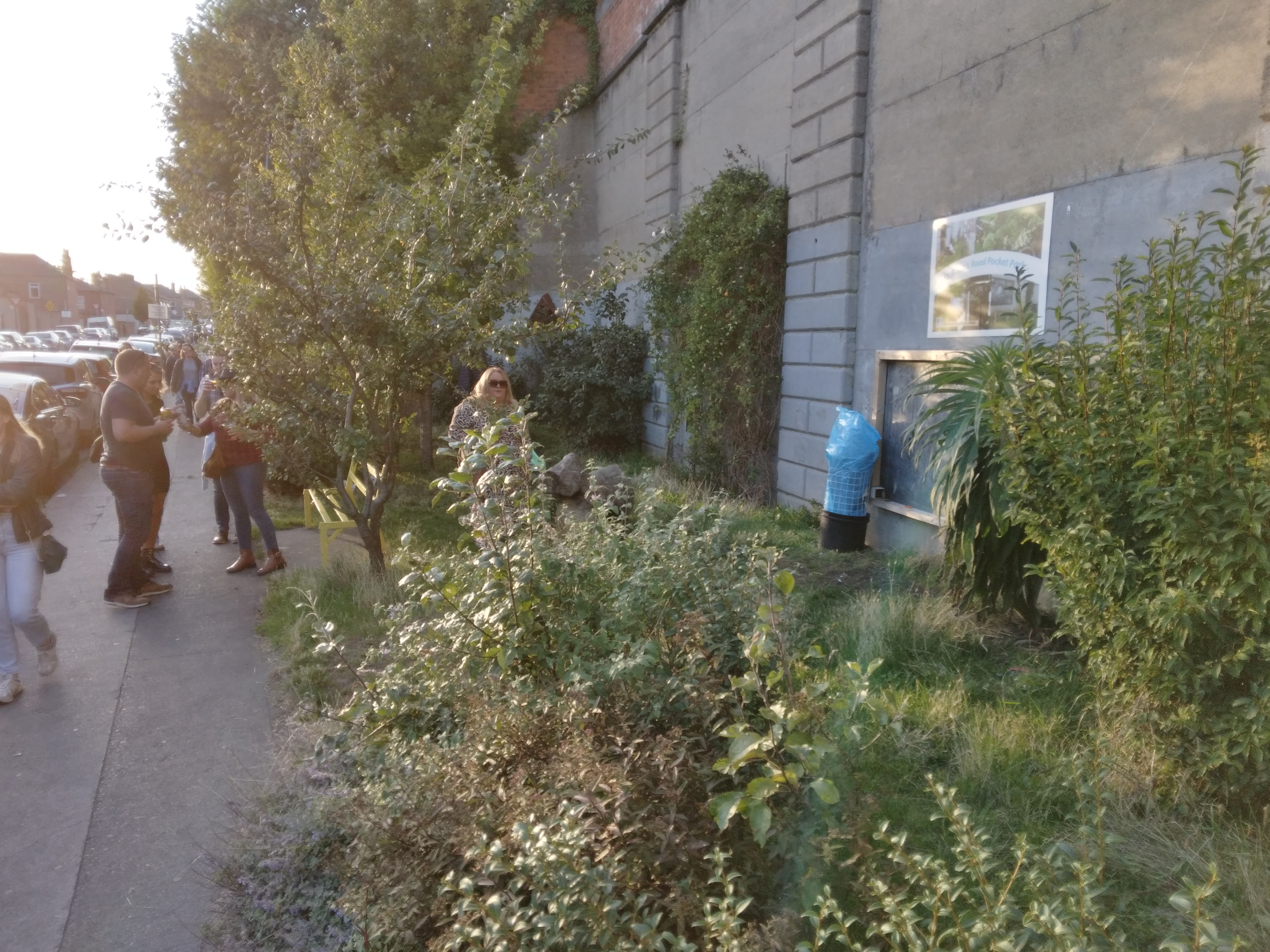
The park in September 2022

A number of arthropods, animals and plants are found in the park, including quercus robur, fuchsia, aphids, honey bees, bumblebees, hoverflies, passiflora edulis, millipedes, centipedes, woodlice, jacobaea vulgaris, plantago lanceolata as well as two-spot, ten-spot and 22-spot ladybirds. It has been called a "perfect example for a micro green-infrastructure stepping stone, if you look at the rich habitat it creates".

== Operations ==
Maintenance of the park is managed by local residents. DCC collects rubbish bags, but all other work is done by park users. In January 2021, the park was included in an Irish Times article named "11 Ways to Reinvigorate Dublin City Centre - Outdoor Pools, Pocket Parks, and Small-Business Support Among the Possibilities". In 2022 the community applied to DCC for funding to replace the original play elements built from native oak in 2016, which had begun to rot.

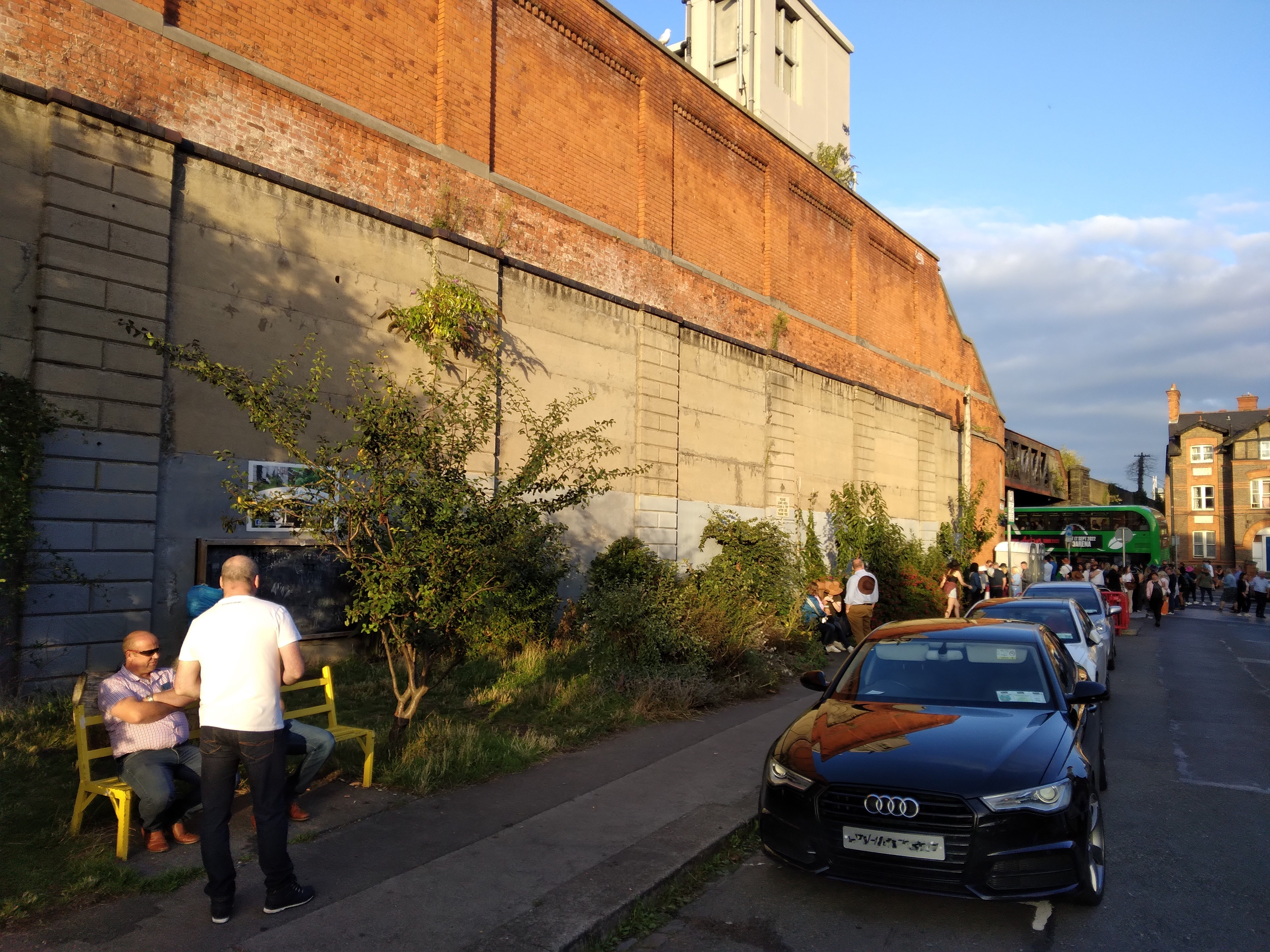
Evening sun in the park in 2022 before a Garth Brooks concert at nearby Croke Park

In 2023, the community and artist Sophie von Maltzan were granted funding to host a series of events in the park to involve the community in further improving the park. A children's book exchange shelf was built and 30 weather resistant portraits that the community painted of each other were hung in the park. Exploratory events and talks were held with professionals, such as entomologists and botanists happened. In June 2023 the community wrote a script for a play about the Pocket Park, which was subsequently performed in the Pocket park by Martin Cahill and Muirenn Lyons. It was followed by a street feast.

=== Further plans ===
Community representatives have spoken of plans for further improvements to the park. As a spokesperson in the official Dublin City Public Participation Network video explained, "We'd very much like to improve the playfulness of the park, because really this is a park for older people to come and sit and take a rest, and for kids to come and play, and everyone in between".

== Similar projects ==
Other pocket park and community-led projects in Dublin have included the Smithfield Art Tunnel, St Mary's Abbey Pocket Park, various iterations of green space at Bridgefoot Street, several projects in Phibsboro, Montpelier Gardens in Stoneybatter and projects in the suburbs of Ballybough, Donnycarney, Cherry Orchard and Baldoyle.
