= Adalia kuscheli =

Scientific classification
- Kingdom: Animalia
- Phylum: Arthropoda
- Clade: Pancrustacea
- Class: Insecta
- Order: Coleoptera
- Suborder: Polyphaga
- Infraorder: Cucujiformia
- Family: Coccinellidae
- Genus: Adalia
- Species: A. kuscheli

Binomial name
- Adalia kuscheli Mader, 1957

Species of beetle

Adalia kuscheli is a species of ladybug in the genus Adalia. It is found in southern Chile, in Araucanía Region, Los Lagos Region and Chiloé Island. It was described by Leopold Mader in a 1957 issue of Revista Chilena de Entomología and named after Guillermo Kuschel.

== Description ==
The species has a broad, oval shaped body with a discontinuous pronotum and elytra.

== Distribution ==
A. kuscheli is distributed between Malleco Province and Chiloé, in the latter only being found in the Greater Island of Chiloé. The fossil record has shown that it has inhabited the area for around 12,000 years BP.
