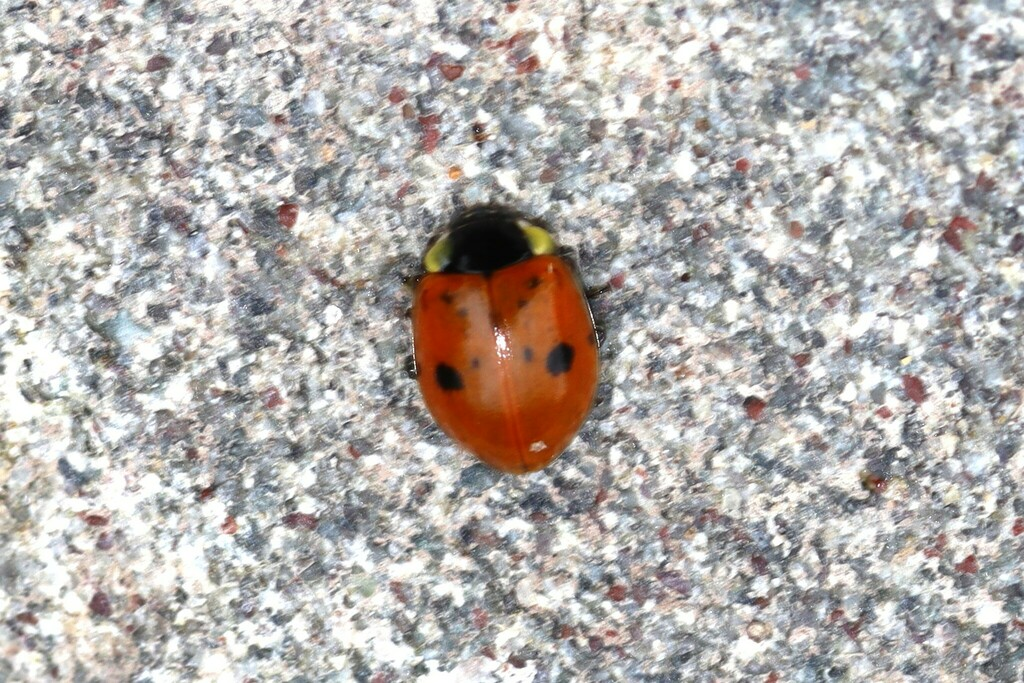

Scientific classification
- Kingdom: Animalia
- Phylum: Arthropoda
- Clade: Pancrustacea
- Class: Insecta
- Order: Coleoptera
- Suborder: Polyphaga
- Infraorder: Cucujiformia
- Family: Coccinellidae
- Genus: Adalia
- Species: A. tetraspilota

Binomial name
- Adalia tetraspilota (Hope, 1831)

Synonyms
- Coccinella tetraspilota Hope, 1831; Coccinella dorsimacula Fabricius, 1798 (preocc.); Adalia hopii Mulsant, 1850

= Adalia tetraspilota =

Species of beetle

Adalia tetraspilota is a species of beetle of the family Coccinellidae. It is found in India (Delhi, Himachal Pradesh, Jammu & Kashmir, Sikkim, Uttarakhand, Uttar Pradesh), Pakistan, Nepal, Afghanistan and China.

== Description ==
Adults reach a length of about 4.38–4.9 mm (0.172–0.193 in). The head is black with two creamy yellow spots. The pronotum is black, with the lateral sides creamy yellow and the anterior margin transparent. The elytra are orange yellow to red, with two pairs of black spots.

== Life history ==
They primarily prey on Adelgidae and Aphididae species.
