= Adalia simmondsi =

Scientific classification
- Kingdom: Animalia
- Phylum: Arthropoda
- Clade: Pancrustacea
- Class: Insecta
- Order: Coleoptera
- Suborder: Polyphaga
- Infraorder: Cucujiformia
- Family: Coccinellidae
- Genus: Adalia
- Species: A. simmondsi

Binomial name
- Adalia simmondsi Kapur & Sudha Rao, 1962

Synonyms
- Adalia puetzi Iablokoff-Khnzorian, 1986

Species of beetle

Adalia simmondsi is a species of beetle of the family Coccinellidae. It is found in India (Himachal Pradesh).

== Description ==
Adults reach a length of about 3.8–4.3 mm (0.15–0.17 in). The head is yellowish testaceous, with a black marking and the pronotum is pale yellowish to ochreous, with 5-11 black maculae. The scutellum is light yellowish brown and sometimes has darker borders. The elytra are pale ochreous to yellowish brown.

== Life history ==
They have been recorded preying on Adelges species.
