= Sophie von Maltzan =

Landscape architect, artist, academic and environmentalist

Sophie Graefin von Maltzan
- Born: Sophie Elisabeth Charlotte Gräfin von Maltzan
- Other name: Sophie Maltzan
- Education: Edinburgh College of Art
- Occupations: Landscape architect and gardener, artist, academic
- Employer(s): University College Dublin, Fieldwork & Strategies
- Known for: Garden designs, urban community-engaged green space projects

Sophie von Maltzan is a German and Irish artist, landscape architect, gardener, academic and environmentalist, known for her work in socially engaged environmental, collaborative projects to improve the public realm in urban settings, primarily in Ireland. She has developed a number of "pocket parks" or community gardens, since 2010.

== Early life and education ==
Sophie Elisabeth Charlotte Gräfin (Note: while this name element translates as "Countess", and is sometimes reported as such in the press, the abolition of the nobility as a class in Germany in 1919 rendered titles obsolete, and converted them to surnames, held by all family members in the relevant lines of descent - further, such naming would anyway not mean that the person was *the* Countess of ABC, in the way that there is one Countess of say, Kildare, in a UK or Irish title, and perhaps a Dowager Countess - but rather simply a descendent of such a line; now Gräfin von Maltzan is just a fully-expressed surname, in the same way that a full Hispanic surname may have multiple elements.) von Maltzan was born in Munich. She trained as an artist at the Charles H. Cecil Studios, and as a gardener at the Galabau, Hamburg, and pursued undergraduate and postgraduate studies at Edinburgh College of Art (ECA) and at the Ecole nationale superieure de Versailles. During her time with the ECA, she spent a year at France's National Institute for Horticulture and Landscape Management, at Versailles. (Note: this Grande Ecole later merged into the Institut Agro) She completed an honours master's degree in Landscape Architecture at ECA in 2003, with a dissertation entitled "Can landscape architecture play a role as a marketing communications tool to develop or maintain positive brand association? (Landscape the ambushed model? / The funding of landscape architecture by advertising.)". (Note: At least one of von Maltzan's later arts projects, the Smithfield Arts Tunnel, offered a partial funding-billboard model)

== Career ==
Von Maltzan began her career as an artist in the early 2000s, exhibiting self-portraits in Edinburgh, then, having moved to Ireland in 2004, exhibiting a selection of paintings in Dublin in 2007. She also produced large-scale watercolour paintings, many of landscapes she had observed, stored in folding "leporello" forms, with lengths of 1.5 to 5.5 or more metres. Later her studio was located at her apartment on Mountjoy Square East. She is a member of Visual Artists Ireland.

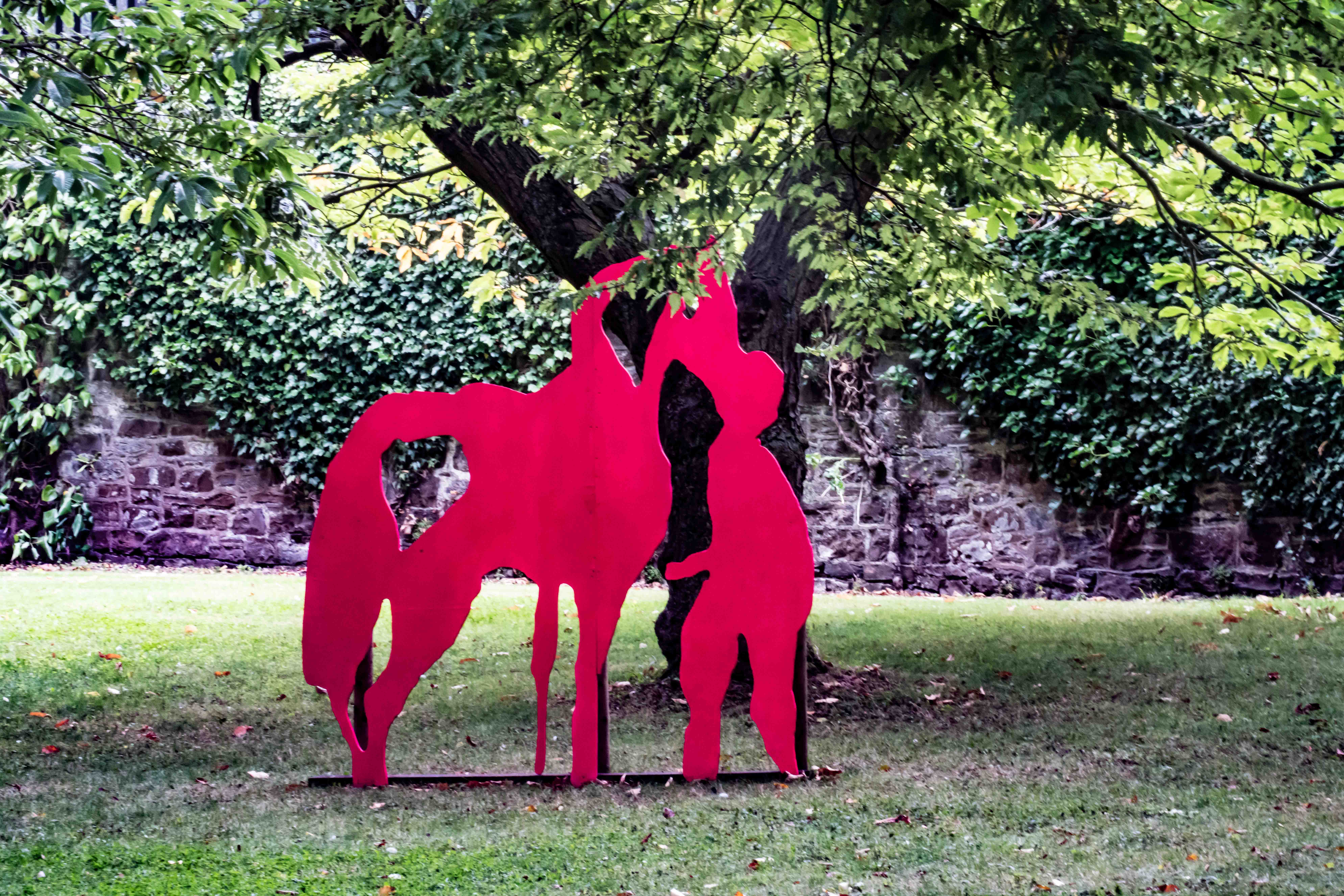
Part of "Finglas Boys" by von Maltzan, at national event Sculpture in Context, 2015

Von Maltzan also produces works of sculpture and in 2011, she was accepted to display a piece at the annual Irish national sculpture exhibition Sculpture in Context; she was also accepted, with the piece Finglas Boys, for the 2015 edition of Sculpture in Context.

She worked as a landscape architect for landscape architecture firm Mitchell+Associates, and later founded her own practice, Fieldwork and Strategies. Von Maltzan has also worked as a lecturer, and tutor, in Landscape Architecture at University College Dublin, since at least 2010. Her students have been involved in a number of her projects, with assignments off-campus and in the community. She has also taught a module on environmental art to trainee primary school teachers at DCU.

=== Designs and projects ===
==== Landscape design and activism ====
Between 2009 and 2011, four of Von Maltzan's activists garden designs were included in the Bloom national garden festival in Dublin, with three winning medals. In 2010 and 2011, she managed a project to study potential reuse of the spaces left in Ballymun after the high tower blocks were removed, involving her UCD students and local schoolchildren. In 2012, she set up a project to produce garden areas for three inner city schools in Dublin, later the subject of an exhibition at DARC Space on North Great George's Street.

==== Pocket parks and community green spaces ====
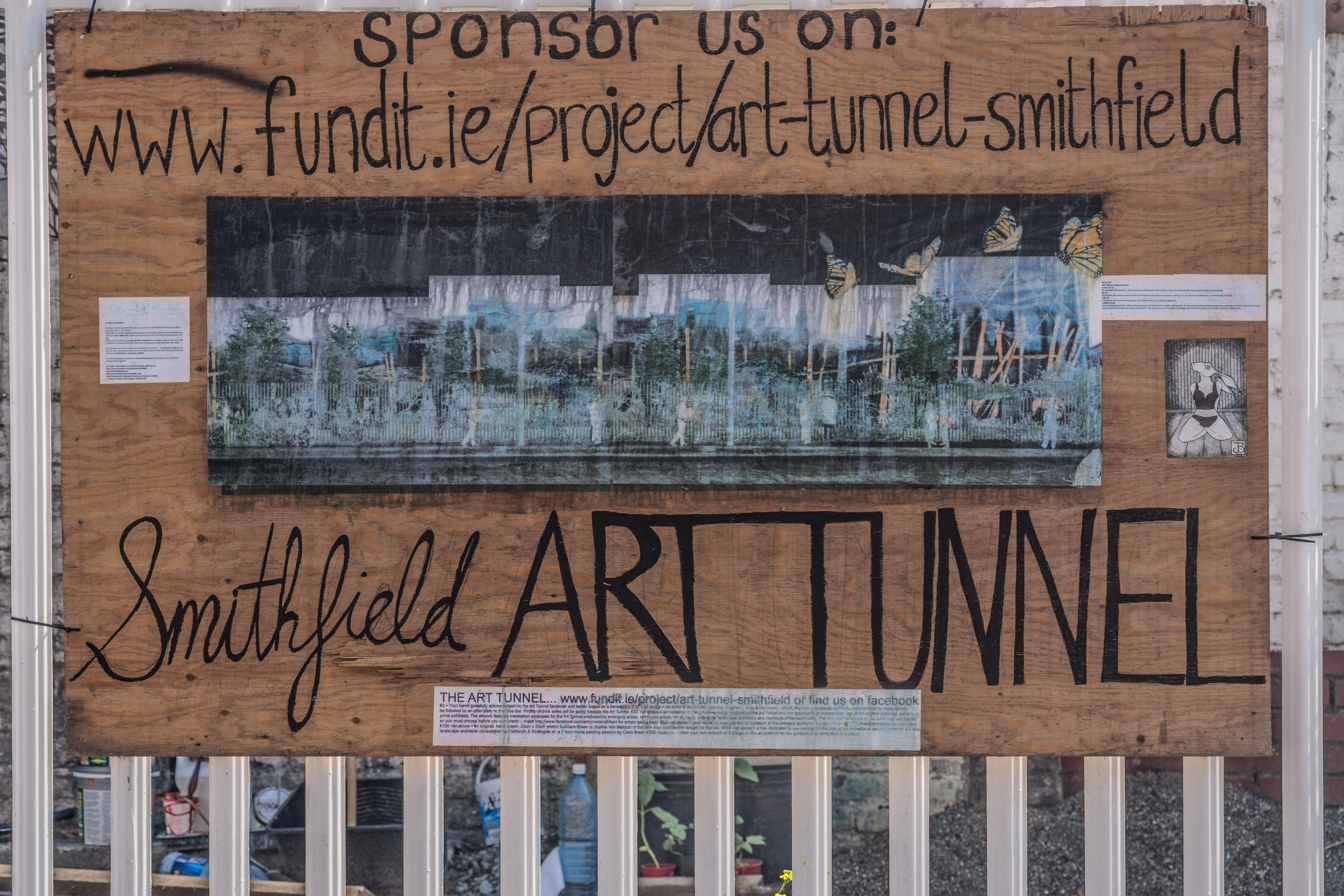
Smithfield Art Tunnel under construction

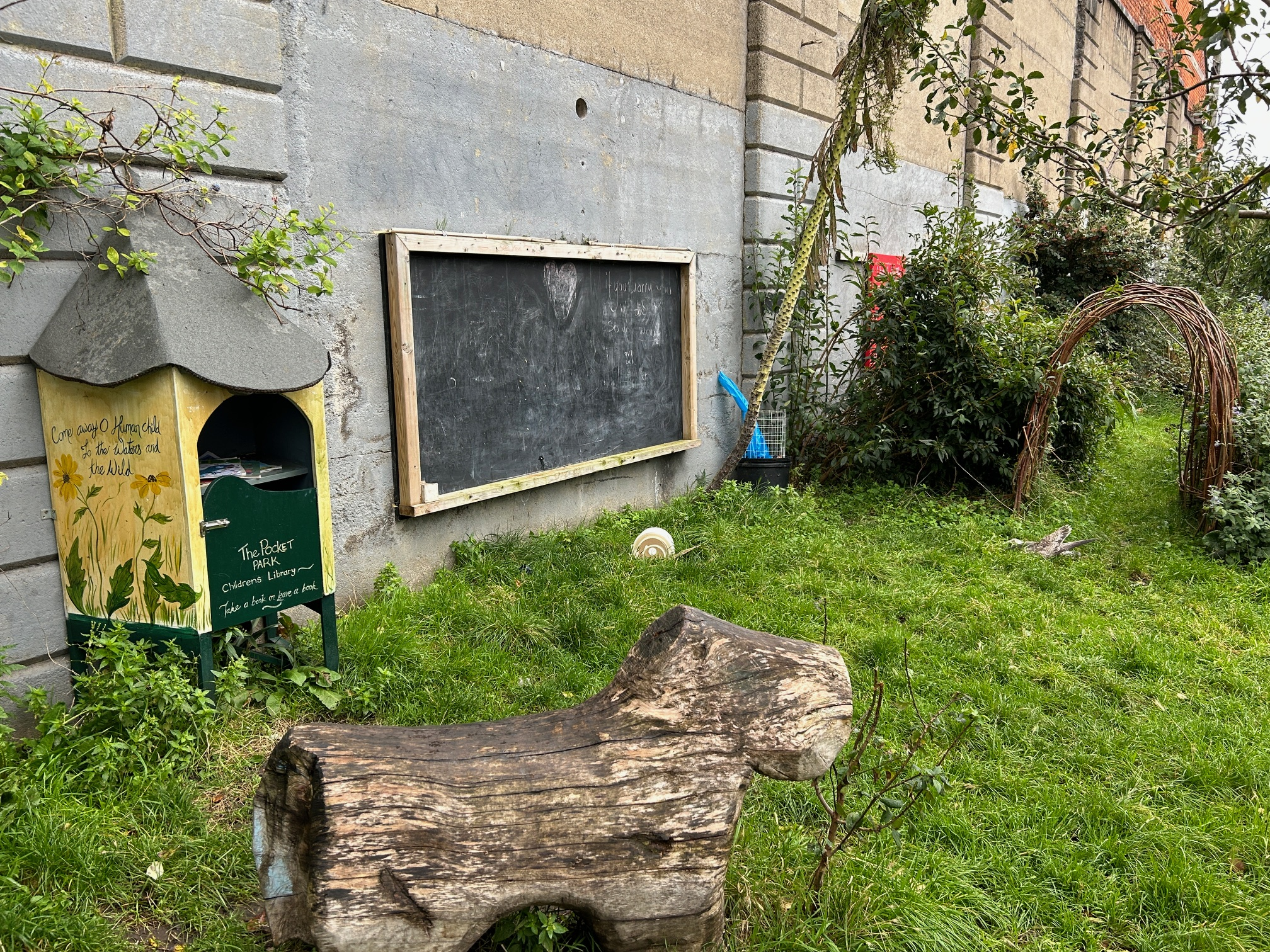
St Anne's Road Pocket Park, book box and willow gate

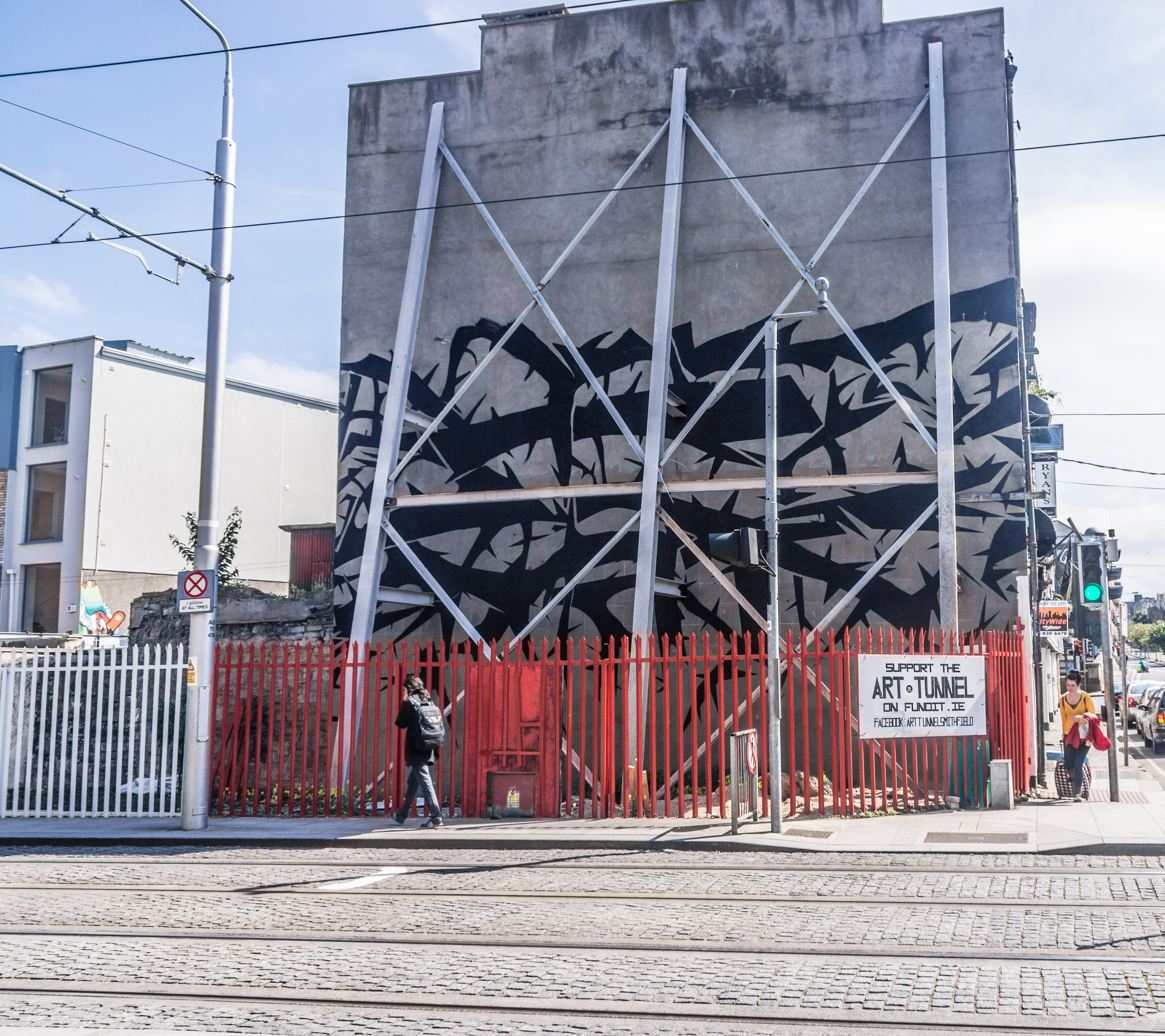
one end of Smithfield Art Tunnel

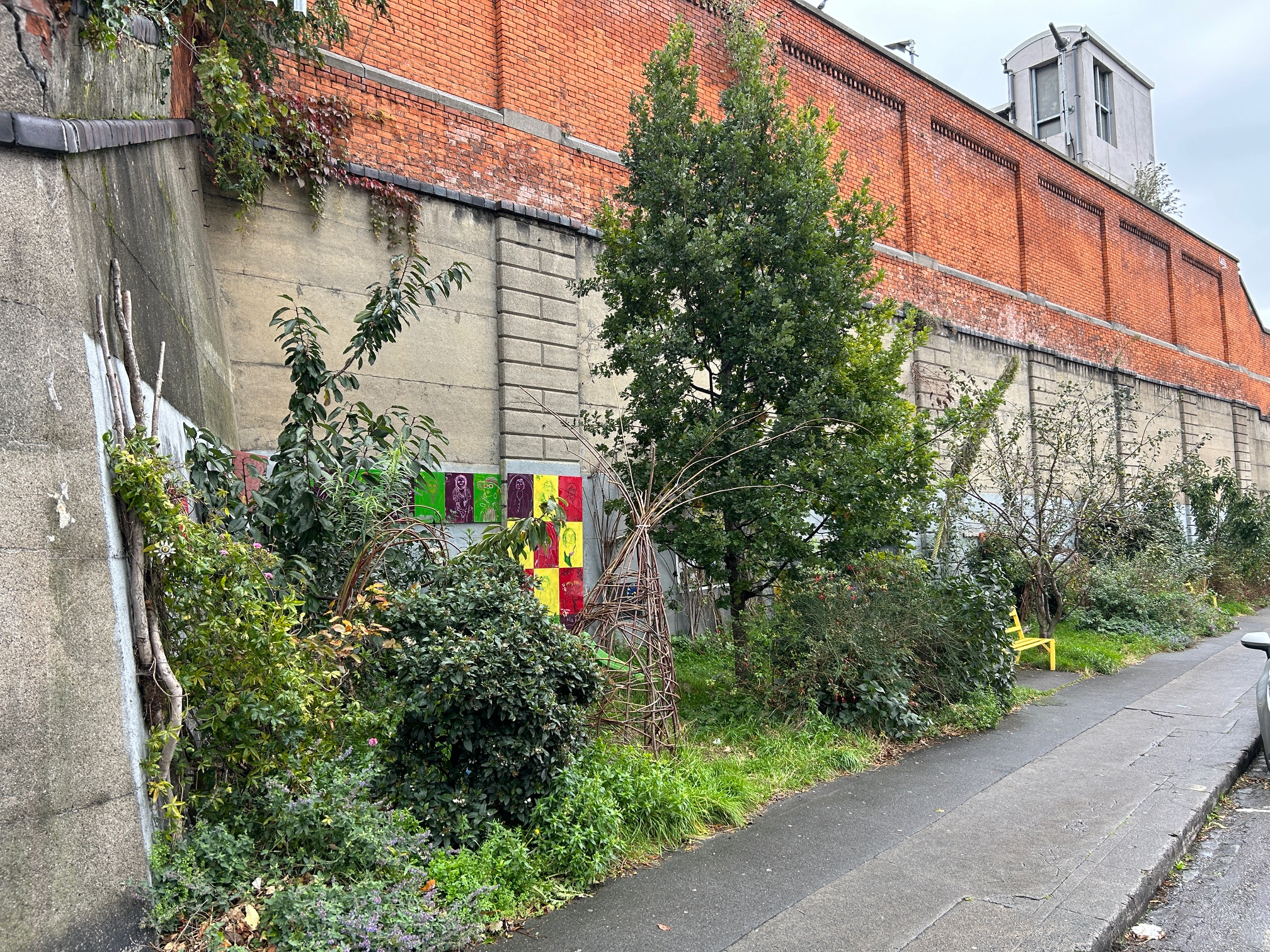
St Anne's Road Pocket Park, one end, looking east

In 2012 she launched the Smithfield Art Tunnel, a community garden and display space for art, developed with the local community and fellow artists, which operated for around two years. The project was the subject of a chapter in Cara Courage's academic text, Arts in place : the arts, the urban and social practice. The landowner decided not to renew the project's lease, which ceased 10 March 2014; von Maltzan did not argue, so as not to scare off other potential lenders of land for similar projects, and the park was dismantled as planned.

She also led the Mary's Abbey Pocket Park project, at a corner of Arran Street East, which ran from 2014 to 2017, and was designer and project manager for the community-led St. Anne's Road Pocket Park in Drumcondra (2016-), a project with which she continued to be involved as of 2024. In 2023, the community and Von Maltzan were awarded a CREATE Ireland project grant, to research the value of this pocket park to the neighbourhood and the greater community. The result of the research can be seen on the project specific website: https://www.stannespocketpark.com/

In 2017 she worked on plans for improved play facilities on York Street in central Dublin. In 2020, she was appointed as one of three artists under a community arts project of Dublin City University, and worked with public input and local schoolchildren to form a "micro pocket park" in the grounds of the former All Hallows College.

==== Collaborative willow weaving projects ====
In 2016, the Phibsboro Tidy Towns committee asked von Maltzan's practice to assist with a memorial concept, and after discussion with the Croke Park Community Fund, four ideas for local arts projects, that von Maltzan developed with the UCD students were shortlisted, the first to proceed being the Great Willow Weave. This project involved public engagement in forming play-suitable woven willow structures, with von Maltzan, some of her UCD students and more than 200 local school pupils building the first 10 play structures. The willow forms were temporary but maintained for months in 2017, and with a new set made, with over 400 school pupils involved, in 2018. An exhibition showcasing the project was hosted by the Royal Institute of the Architects of Ireland in 2018.

In 2021, under a local authority contract, von Maltzan built willow structures with a local school for Bushy Park in Rathfarnham. In autumn 2022 and 2023, she led a willow-sculpture project for and in the grounds of the Irish Museum of Modern Art (IMMA) in Kilmainham. The sculptures were dismantled or disposed of some weeks later, with the last, in the form of a submarine, walked through the streets of Dublin to a new location at Canal Way national school. The IMMA project was later discussed, with talks and film, at an event at Ireland's National College of Art and Design.

==== Rural collaborative projects ====
In 2023, Von Maltzan commenced working in Westmeath, where she lives, and works part-time, on a cattle and stud farm. With Westmeath County Council Creative Ireland funding, she conducted a practice-based investigation into sustainable beef farming, The land that feeds us; this is an ongoing collaboration and has received funding for 2024 as well.

== Awards and recognition ==
Von Maltzan has been awarded several arts grants and bursaries by the Arts Council and is the recipient of multiple funding awards from local authorities.

Von Maltzan's "Recession-Prosperity Garden" won a silver medal at the national garden festival, Bloom (Note: Bloom, like several other garden shows, has awards at the levels of: Best in Show, Gold, Silver-Gilt, Silver, Bronze and Commendation) in 2009, and a national award from the Irish Landscape Institute the same year. (Note: The institute has overall awards and student awards, with further projects receiving Highly Commended or Commended recognition) She won two silver-gilt medals at the Bloom festival in 2011, for the design of the garden at the Steam Museum, Straffan, and for the concept green space, "An Outdoor Gallery", which inspired part of the later Smithfield Art Tunnel project. She was also the landscape architecture member of the team behind the Naas civic offices and garden project which was nominated for an EU prize for contemporary architecture in 2007.

Von Maltzan is one of the gardeners profiled in the German-language book Blumenfrauen.

== Publications ==
- The Great Willow Weave, sole author: Royal Institute of Architects September 2018 (Exhibition pamphlet)
- Community and University partnerships and projects, sole author, UCD community engagement report 17-18, June 2018, p. 18
- School Grounds design by children, sole author, project summary report, September 2013

Von Maltzan also developed an interactive booklet encouraging children to take on the role of landscape architects and develop design proposals potential for site development after clearance as part of a project in Ballymun; it was later distributed to schools in the area by Ballymun Regeneration Limited. She also published a children’s picture book, Grumpy's Humphrey.

== Personal life ==
Von Maltzan moved to Ireland in the mid-2000s. As of the early 2010s, her primary residence was on Mountjoy Square, Dublin, but she sometimes also resided in Berlin. In 2011, she had a daughter: Cecily Guinness von Maltzan. As of 2011, she lives near Moyvore, in County Westmeath.
