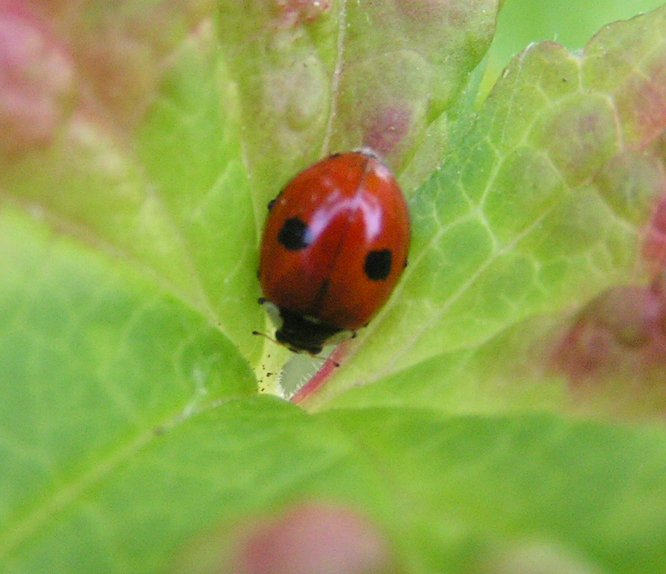
- Adalia bipunctata

Scientific classification
- Kingdom: Animalia
- Phylum: Arthropoda
- Clade: Pancrustacea
- Class: Insecta
- Order: Coleoptera
- Suborder: Polyphaga
- Infraorder: Cucujiformia
- Family: Coccinellidae
- Tribe: Coccinellini
- Genus: Adalia; Mulsant, 1850

Synonyms
- Idalia Mulsant, 1846 (preocc.); Arrowella Brèthes, 1925

= Adalia (beetle) =

Genus of beetles

Adalia is a genus of ladybugs in the family Coccinellidae.

== Subgenera and species ==
- Adalia
  - Adalia angulifera Mulsant, 1850
  - Adalia bipunctata (Linnaeus, 1758)
  - Adalia decempunctata (Linnaeus, 1758)
  - Adalia deficiens Mulsant, 1850
  - Adalia kuscheli Mader, 1957
  - Adalia simmondsi Kapur & Sudha Rao, 1962
  - Adalia testudinea (Wollaston, 1854)
  - Adalia tetraspilota (Hope, 1831)
- Adaliomorpha Iablokoff-Khnzorian, 1979
  - Adalia conglomerata (Linnaeus, 1758)
- Unplaced
  - Adalia gratiosa Mulsant, 1866
  - Adalia lenticulata (Gorham, 1892)
  - †Adalia marginata Förster, 1891
  - †Adalia subversa Scudder, 1900

== Selected former species ==
- Adalia puetzi Iablokoff-Khnzorian, 1986

== Ecology and biogeography ==
Adalia bipunctata is present in Europe, Asia, North America and New Zealand. The species are predominantly aphidophagous, but also show cannibalism and prey on other ladybirds.

Adalia species are subject to parasitism by male-killing bacteria: invasion of one insect species, A. bipunctata, by two different male-killing bacteria, phorid and degeerid flies, as well as sexually transmitted Coccipolipus hippodamiae mites.

== See also ==
- List of Coccinellidae genera and species
