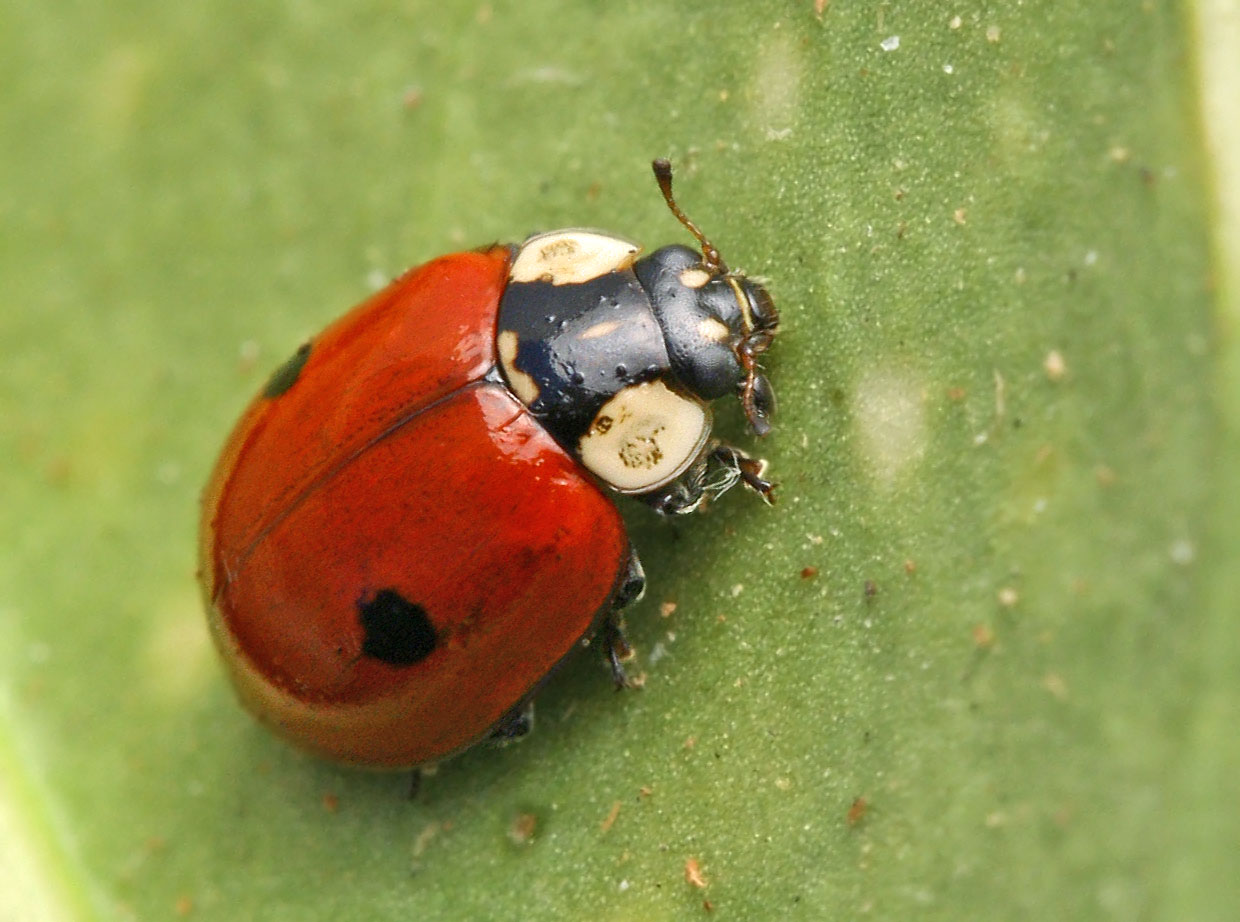

Conservation status
- Secure (NatureServe)

Scientific classification
- Kingdom: Animalia
- Phylum: Arthropoda
- Clade: Pancrustacea
- Class: Insecta
- Order: Coleoptera
- Suborder: Polyphaga
- Infraorder: Cucujiformia
- Family: Coccinellidae
- Genus: Adalia
- Species: A. bipunctata

Binomial name
- Adalia bipunctata (Linnaeus, 1758)

Synonyms
- Coccinella bipunctata Linnaeus, 1758; Coccinella pantherina Linnaeus, 1758; Coccinella sexpustulata Linnaeus, 1758; Coccinella quadrimaculata Scopoli, 1763; Coccinella annulata Voet, 1766; Coccinella cincta O.F. Müller, 1776; Coccinella octoguttata Sulzer, 1776; Coccinella unifasciata Fabricius, 1777; Coccinella tripunctata Roemer, 1789; Coccinella tripustulata Gmelin, 1790; Coccinella hastata Olivier, 1791; Coccinella dispar Schneider, 1792; Coccinella arctica Thunberg, 1795; Coccinella varia Schrank, 1798; Coccinella hyperborea Paykull, 1799; Coccinella perforata Marsham, 1802; Coccinella septempustulata Marsham, 1802; Coccinella bisquadripustulata Haworth, 1812; Coccinella bistriverrucata Haworth, 1812; Coccinella quadripunctata Donovan, 1813; Coccinella bioculata Say, 1824; Coccinella humeralis Say, 1824; Coccinella fasciatopunctata Faldermann, 1835; Coccinella disjuncta Randall, 1838; Adalia ophthalmica Mulsant, 1850; Adalia stictica Mulsant, 1850; Coccinella melanopleura Le Conte, 1859; Adalia ludovicae Mulsant, 1866; Adalia revelierii Mulsant, 1866; Coccinella annectens Crotch, 1873; Adalia concolor Wimmel, 1894; Adalia ornatella Casey, 1899; Adalia ovipennis Casey, 1899; Adalia transversalis Casey, 1899; Adalia bipunctata var. similata Gabriel, 1905; Adalia coloradensis Casey, 1908; Arrowella porteri Brèthes, 1925

= Adalia bipunctata =

Two-spotted lady beetle

Species of beetle

Adalia bipunctata, the two-spot ladybird, two-spotted ladybug or two-spotted lady beetle, is a carnivorous beetle of the family Coccinellidae that is found throughout the holarctic region. It is very common in western and central Europe and a native species in North America. The population of Adalia bipunctata has declined sharply in many states and provinces across North America. It is commonly introduced and imported as a biological control agent.

== Taxonomy ==
The two-spotted ladybird was one of the many species originally described by Carl Linnaeus in his 1758 10th edition of Systema Naturae; its original name was Coccinella bipunctata. Its specific name comes from the Latin bi- ("two") and punctata ("spotted").

=== Varietas ===
- Adalia bipunctata var. annulata (Linnaeus, 1767)
- Adalia bipunctata var. bipunctata (Linnaeus, 1758)
- Adalia bipunctata var. fasciatopunctata (Faldermann, 1835)
- Adalia bipunctata var. quadrimaculata (Scopoli, 1763)
- Adalia bipunctata var. revelierei Mulsant, 1866
- Adalia bipunctata var. turanica Luis, 1947

== Description ==
Adalia bipunctata is a small coccinellid that can feature any one of a large selection of red and black forms. Some forms are similar to Mulsantina picta, but the two white spots on the head of Adalia, in contrast with a large white region or more than two spots, readily distinguish it. Additionally, Adalia is entirely black on the ventral surface with black legs, which helps rule out any other options.

The two-spotted ladybird is highly variable in many parts of its native range. The most familiar form, bipunctata (forma typica), has two black spots on a red base and is common throughout its native range. A melanistic form that is black with four or six red spots is uncommon, but not rare, while the truly melanistic form is exceedingly rare. In North America, the species shows the most variation, with several forms that do not occur elsewhere, including a spotless form, a four-banded form, a form with nine to twelve spots, and a "cross-hatched" form. In addition, there are intermediate forms such as form annulata, but they occur rarely.

== Prey ==
Two-spotted lady beetles feed on aphids and other small insects. However, the sterile soldiers within colonies of aphids such as the gall-forming Pemphigus spyrothecae can attempt to protect the aphid colony by fighting this species.

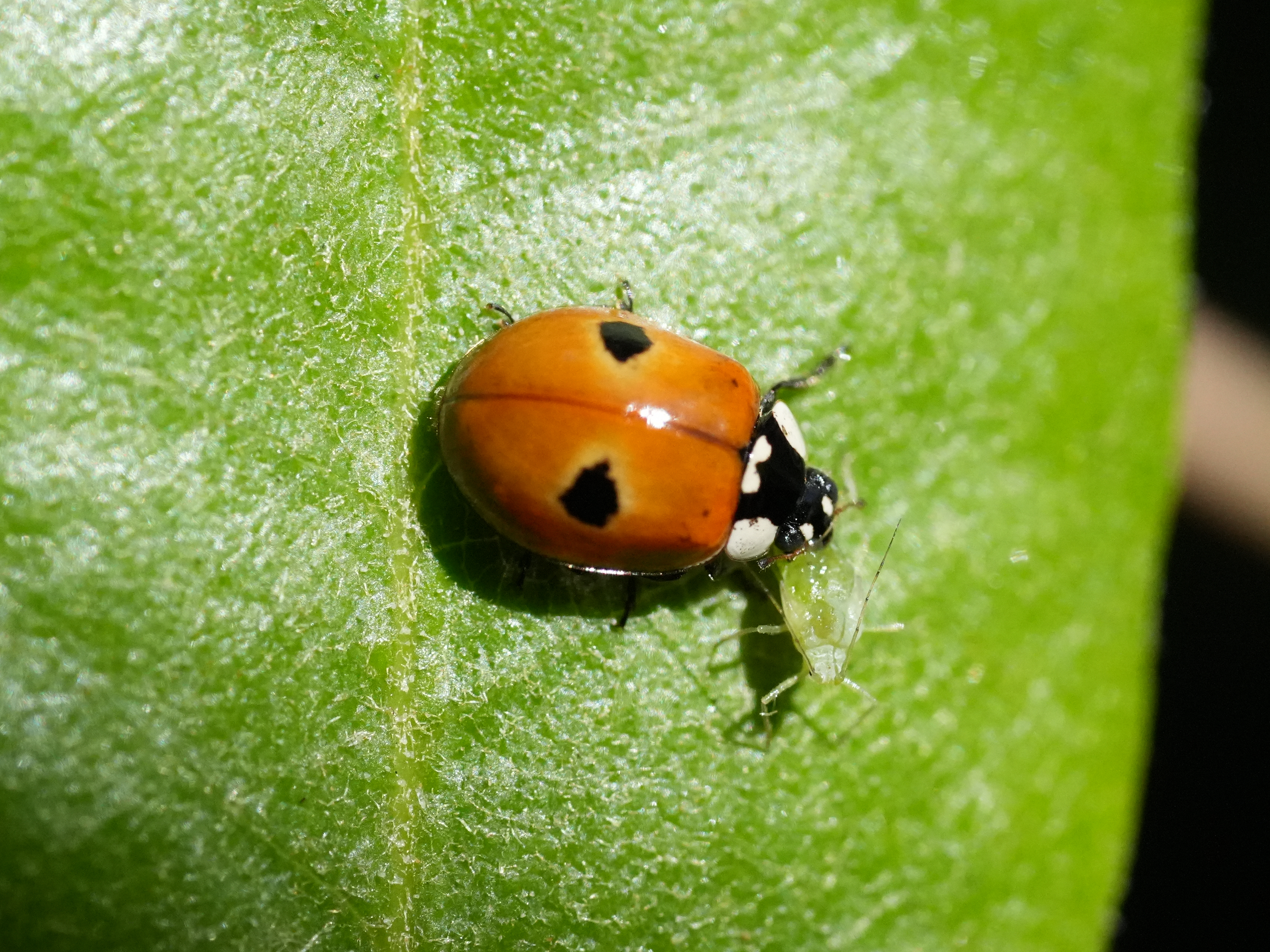
Adult beetle eating an aphid

== Life cycle ==
The two-spotted lady beetle's life cycle starts with eggs that are usually laid in clutches. The larva hatches from the egg by biting a hole in it. The larva looks very different from an adult; it has an elongated, grey, soft body with six legs but no wings. The larvae are cannibalistic. A larva goes through four larval stages. As it feeds and grows, it periodically sheds its old skin, allowing further growth. In its last larval stage, the larva is approximately the size of an adult beetle. Once it has eaten enough, the larva attaches itself to a substrate and moults into a pupa. Inside the pupa, the adult develops. Finally, the adult ecloses from the pupa.

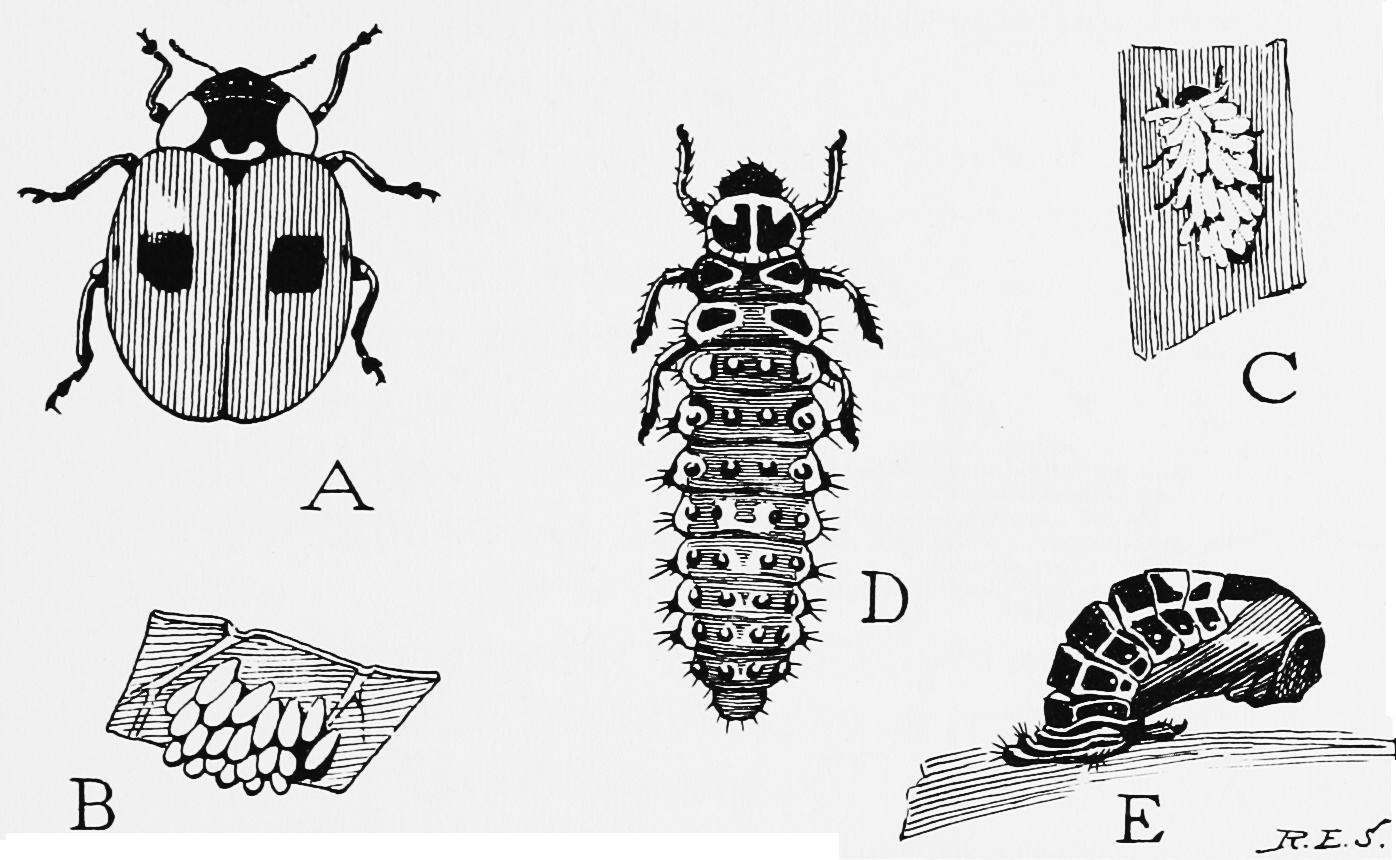
Life cycle of Adalia bipunctata. Illustration from Insects, Their Way and Means of Living by R. E. Snodgrass.

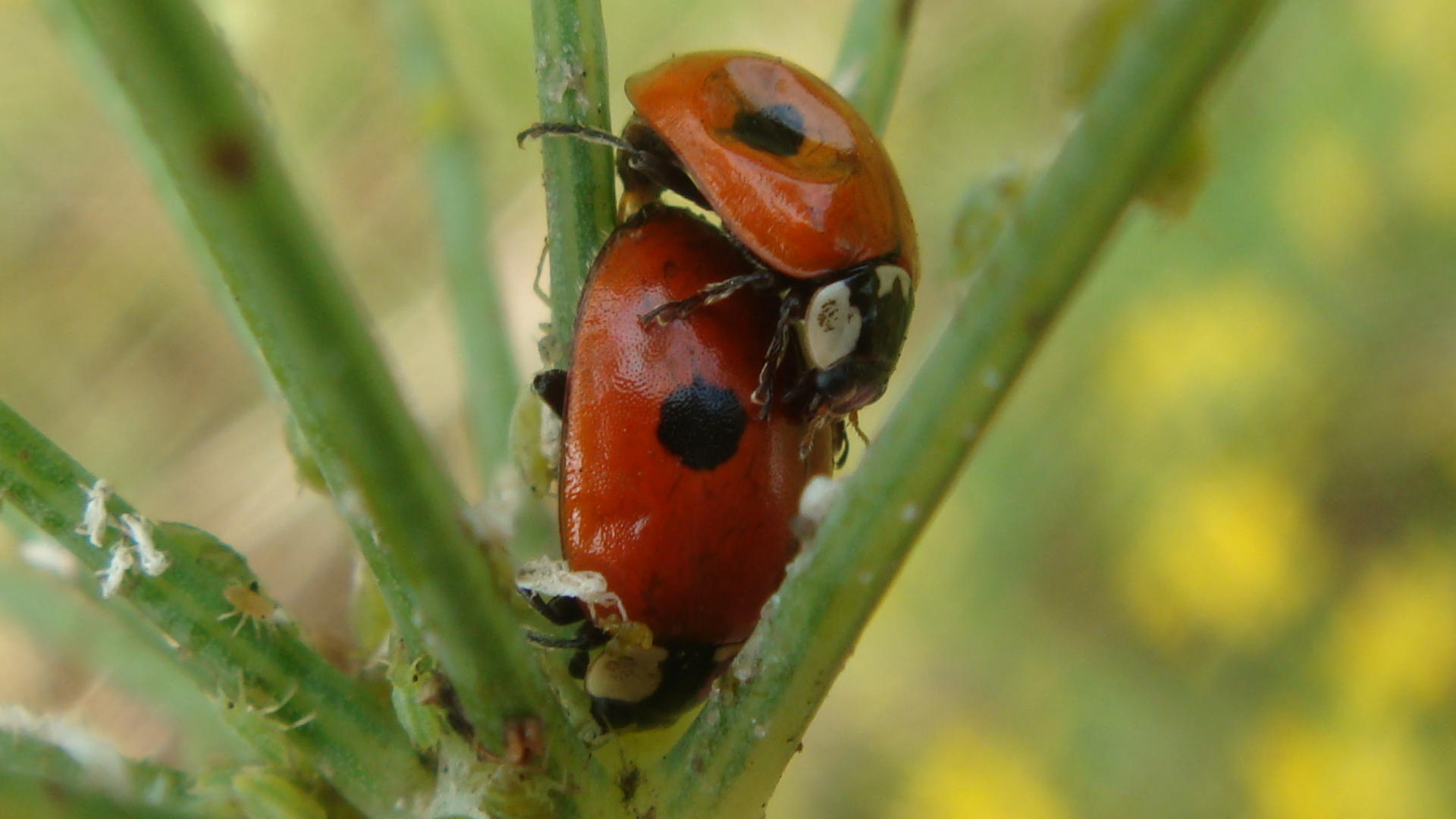
Spotted lady beetles mating

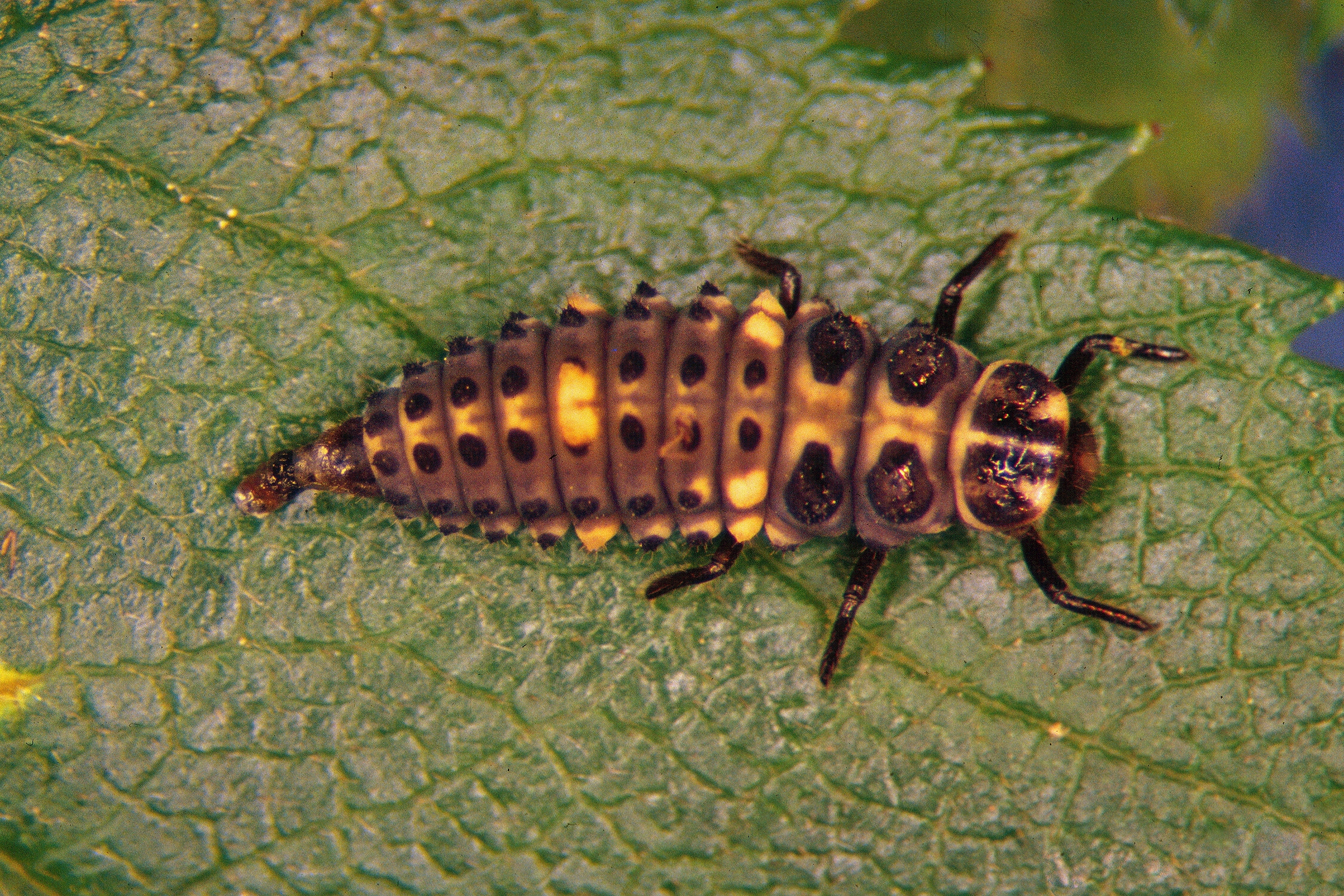
Larva

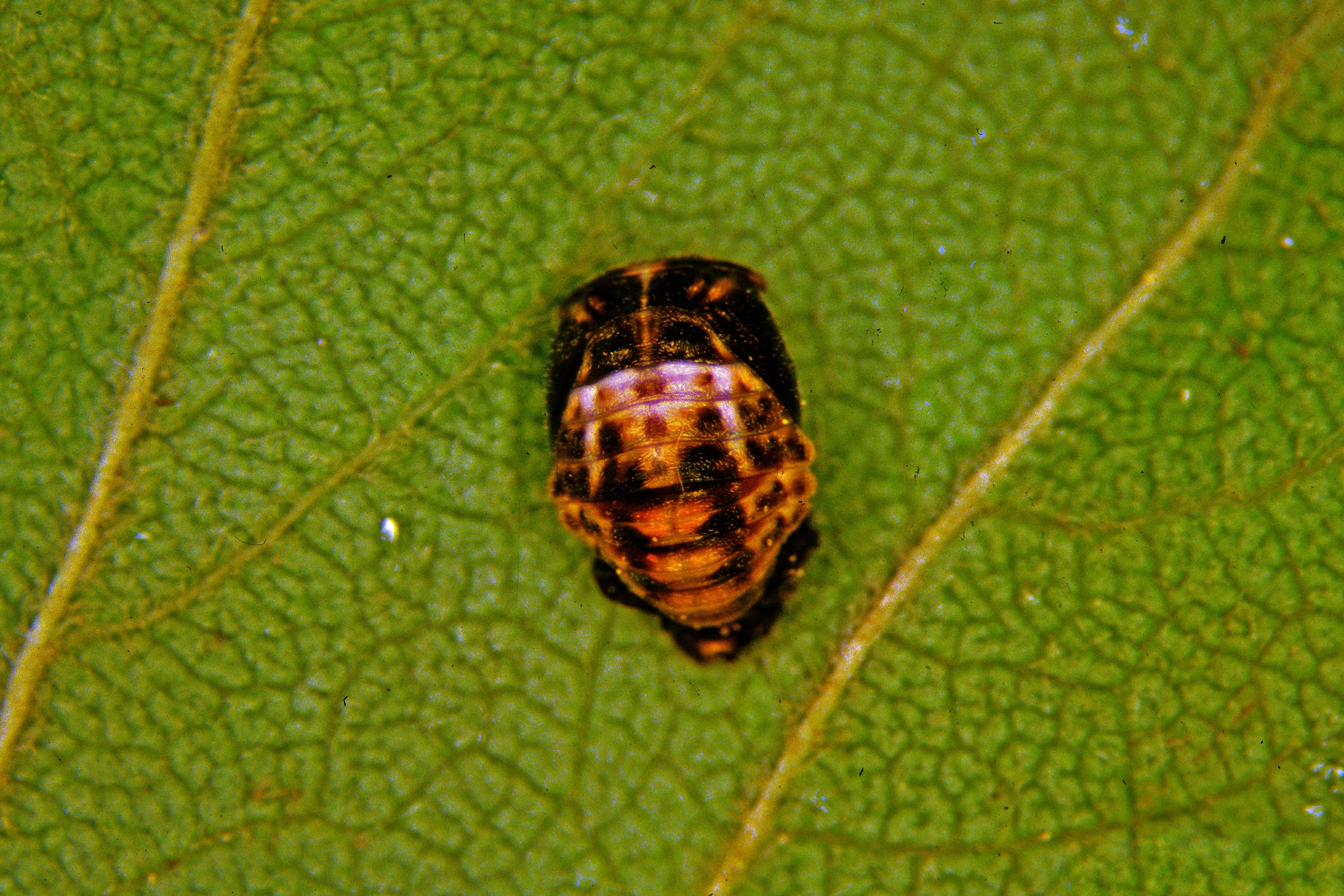
Pupa

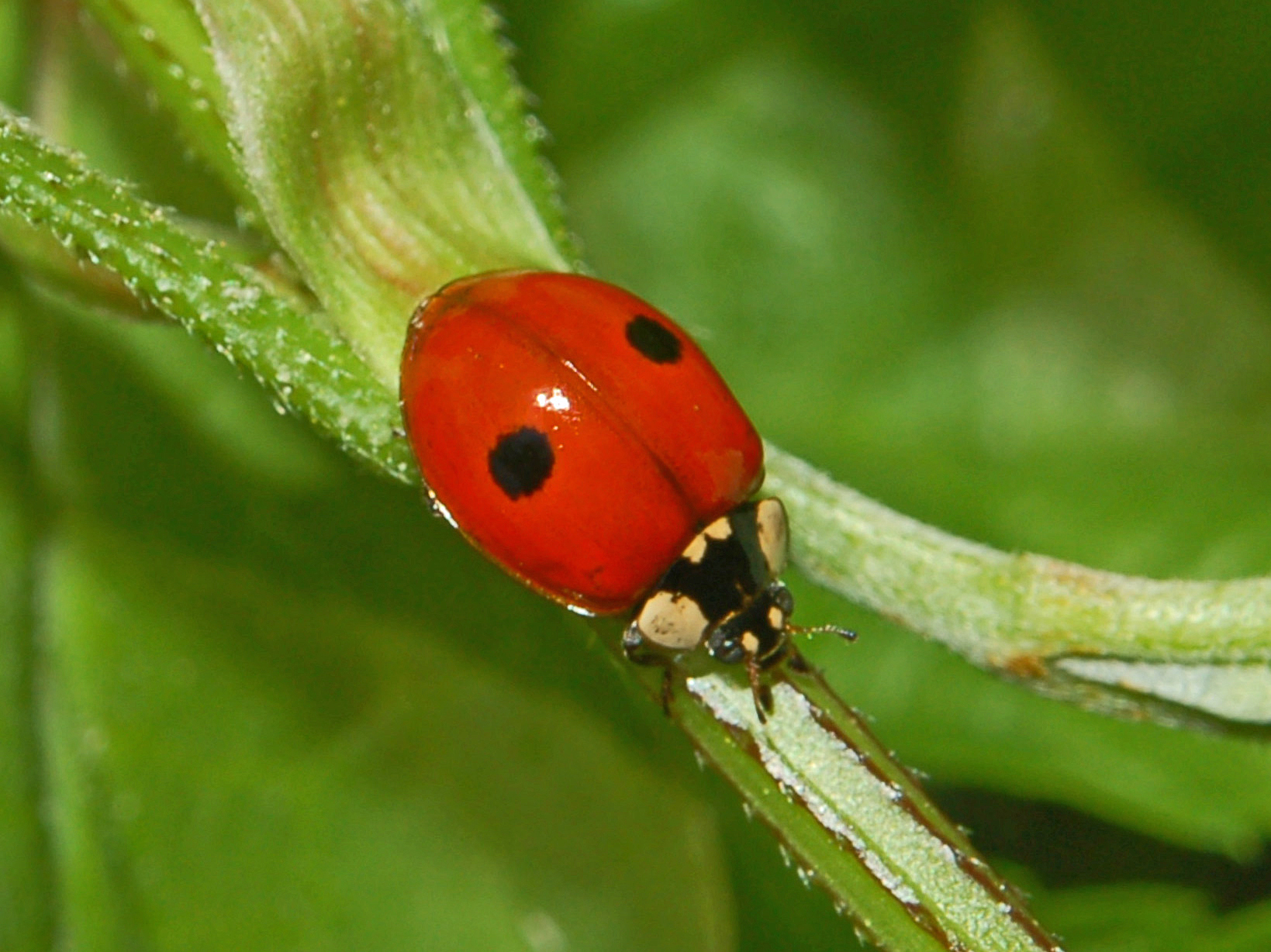
The adult beetle

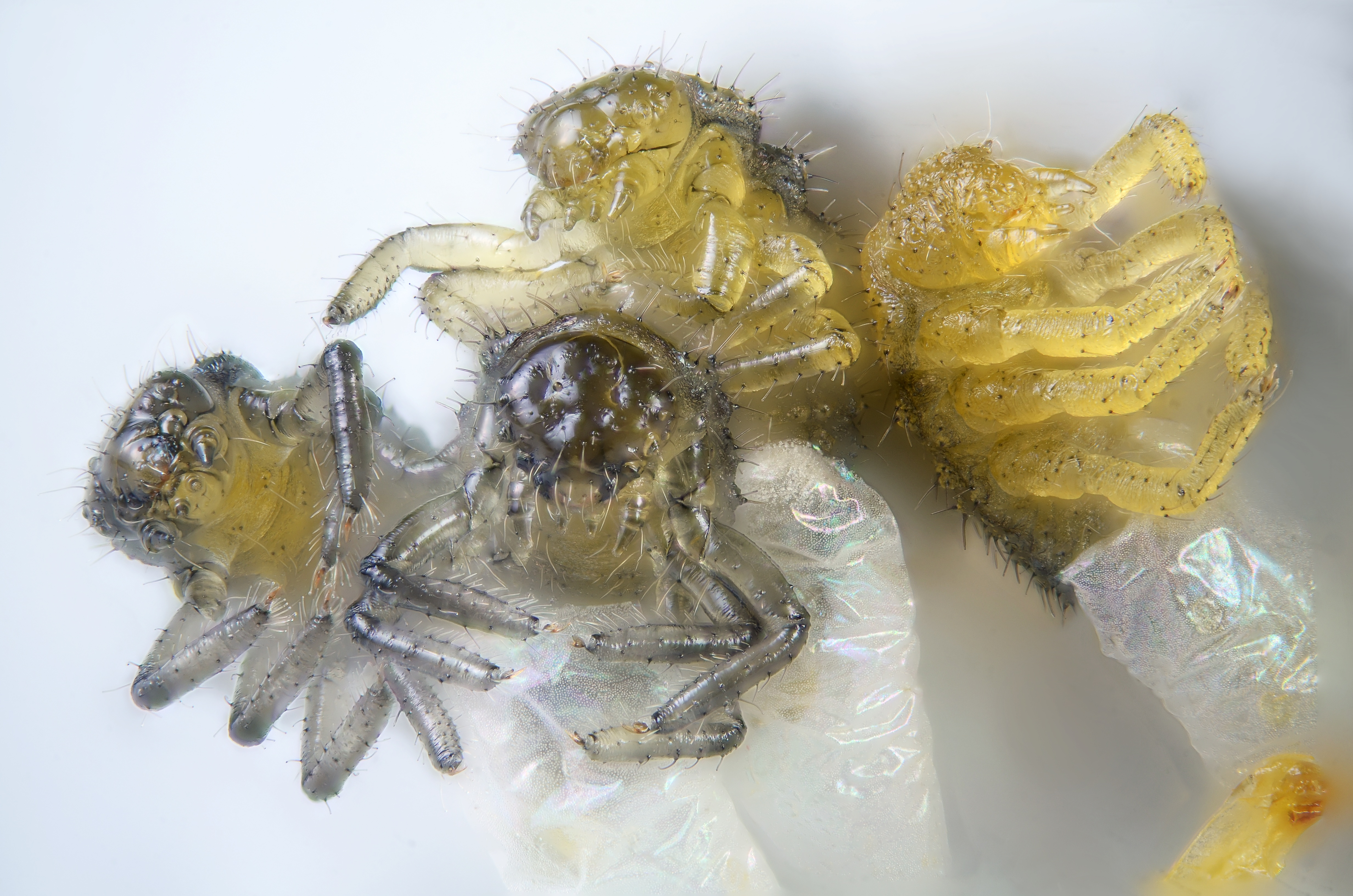
Newborns

== Sex ratio anomalies ==
=== Symbiosis ===
In some populations, the majority of the beetles are female. In these populations, 80–90% of the offspring are female. The cause of this anomaly is the presence of symbiotic bacteria living within the gametic cells of the female lady beetles. The bacterium is too large to live in the male gametes (sperm), so the bacterium can be transmitted to the next generation only through female gametes. When it ends up in a male, it will die when the male dies. Therefore, it kills most of the male embryos in the newly laid eggs. These dead embryos then serve as food for their sisters when they emerge from their eggs. This trait is associated with a variety of bacteria (Wolbachia, Rickettsia, and Spiroplasma), which are present in 0–20% of females, depending on the locality.

=== Parasitism ===
The two-spot ladybird also carries a sexually transmitted infection in Central and Eastern Europe. This infection is caused by the ectoparasitic mite Coccipolipus hippodamiae, which is transmitted between males and females during copulation. The infection sterilises female two-spot ladybirds, and at certain times of the year, up to 90% of adult two-spots become infected.

== As a biological control agent ==
A. bipunctata is used as a localised biological control agent against aphids in, for example, greenhouses. The two-spotted lady beetle was introduced into Australia specifically as a biological control agent.

== Gallery ==
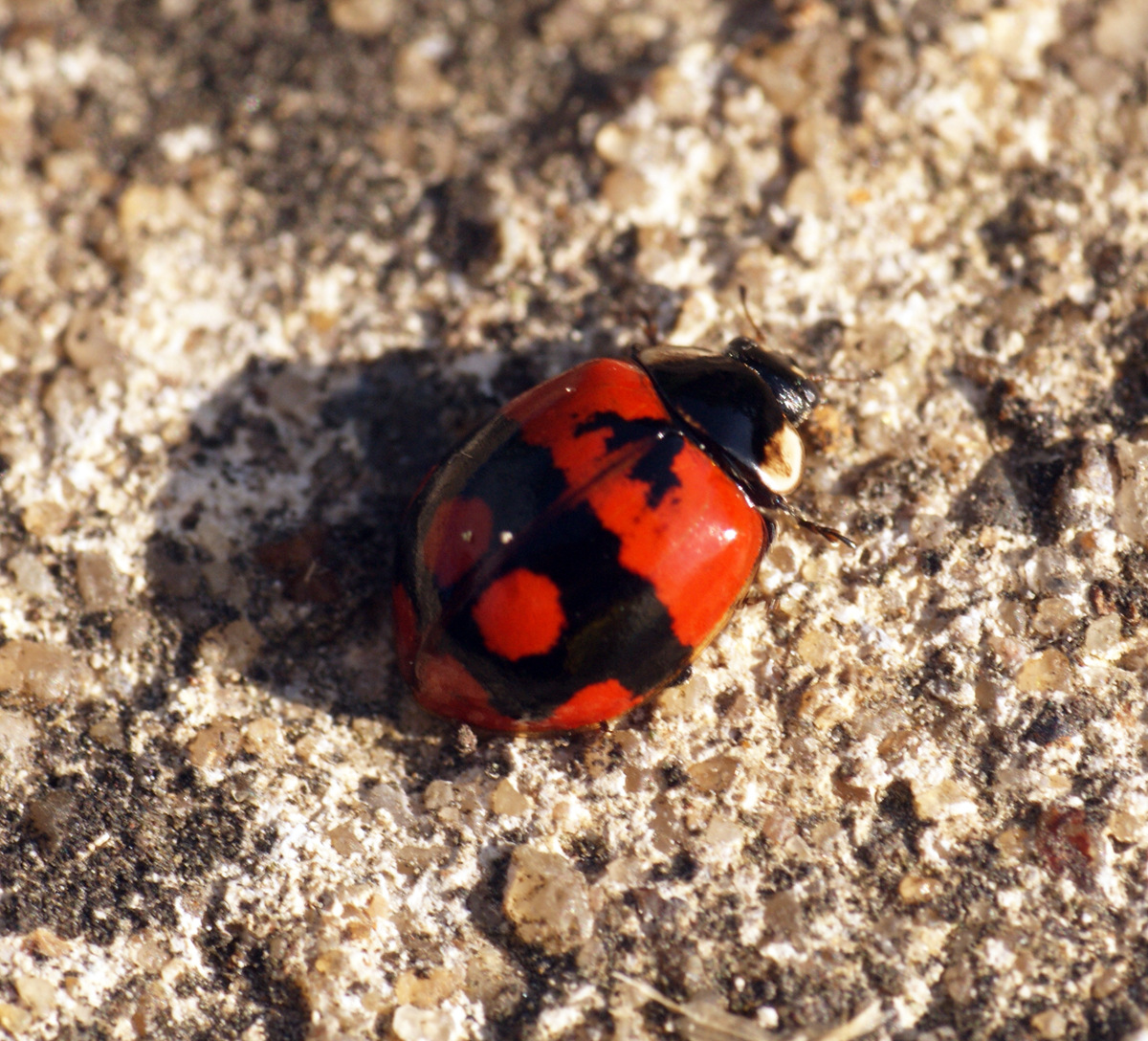
A. bipunctata var. annulata

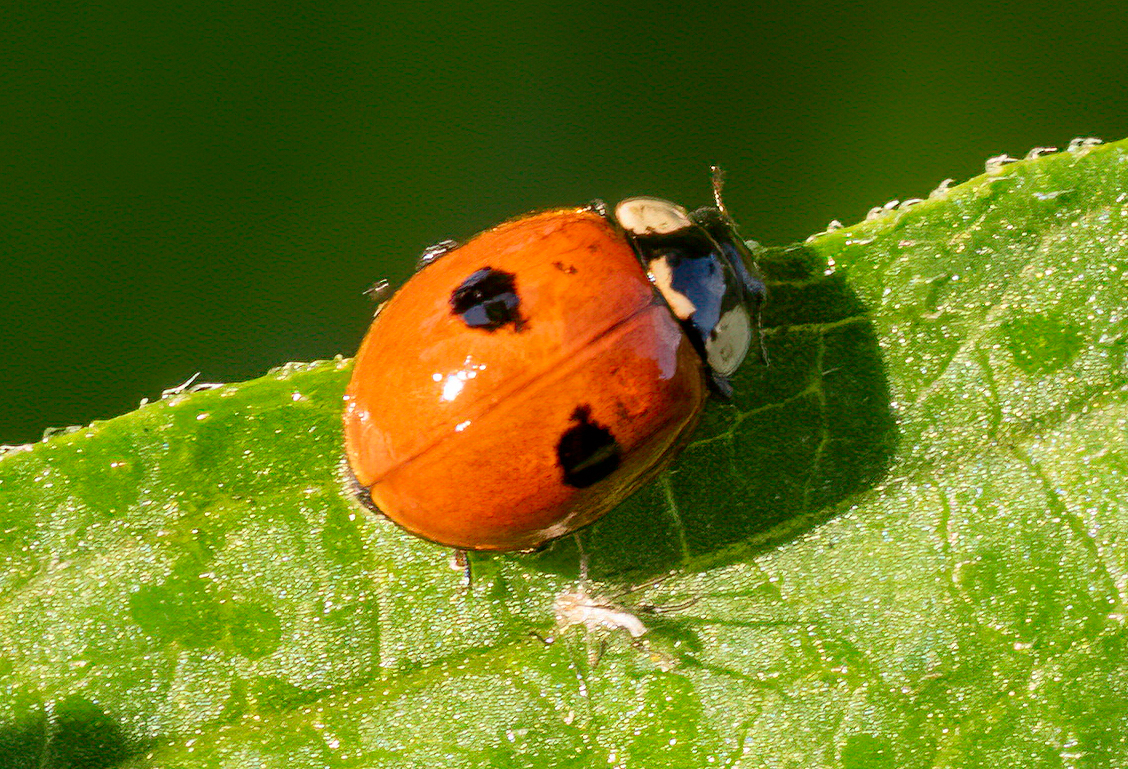
A. bipunctata var. bipunctata

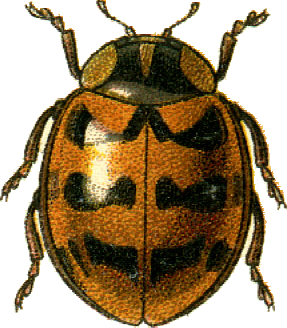
A. bipunctata var. fasciatopunctata

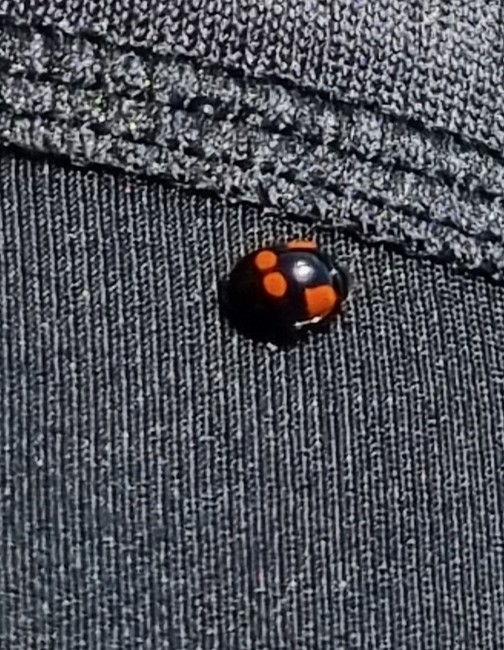
A. bipunctata var. quadrimaculata

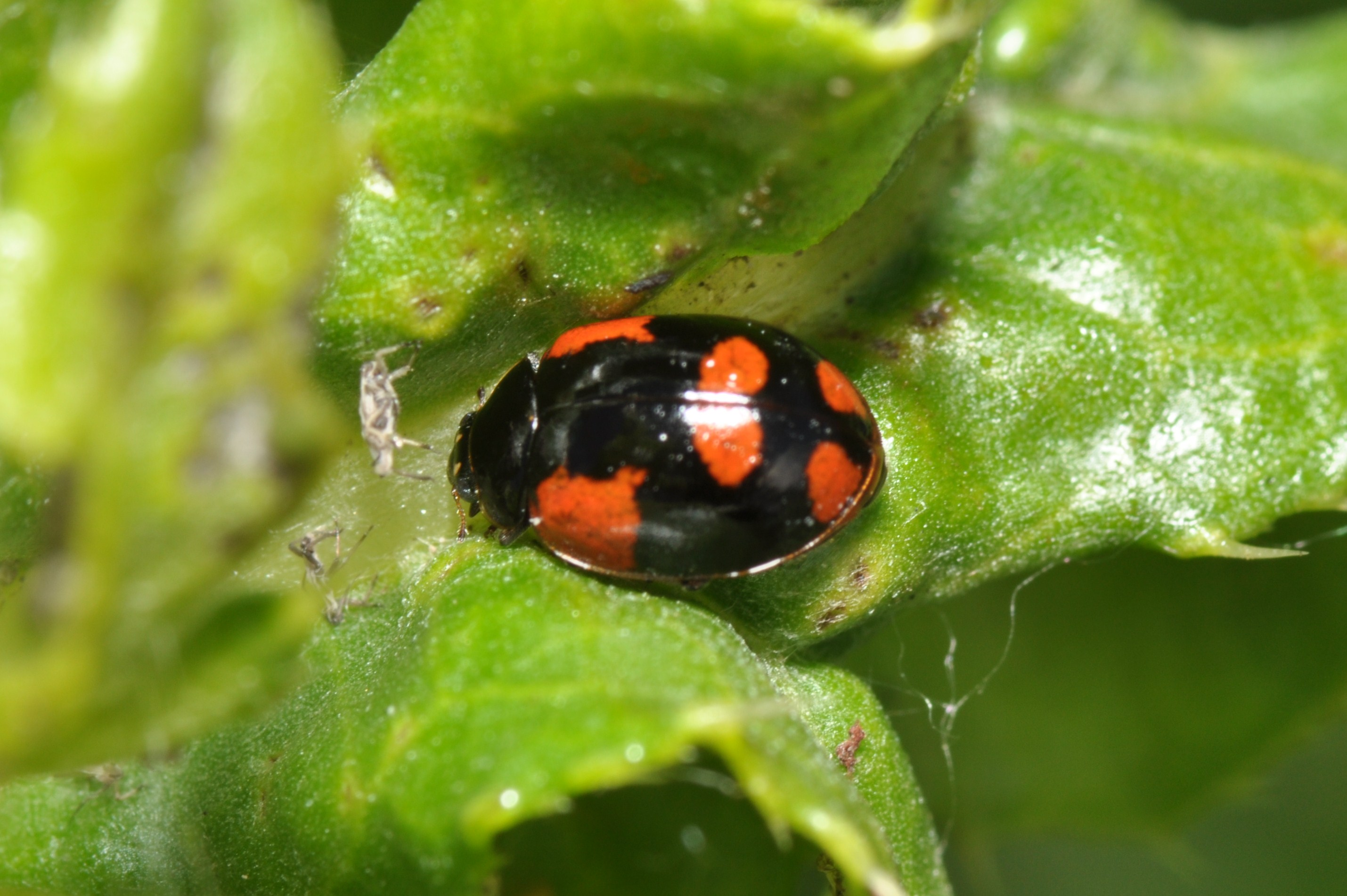
A. bipunctata var. sexpustulata
