= Revista Chilena de Entomología =

- Discipline: Entomology
- Language: English, Spanish
- Edited by: José Mondaca E.

Publication details
- History: 1951–present
- Publisher: Sociedad Chilena de Entomología (Chile)

Standard abbreviations
- ISO 4: Rev. Chil. Entomol.

Indexing
- ISSN: 0034-740X (print); 0718-8994 (web)
- LCCN: 53029430
- OCLC no.: 941358760

Links
- Journal homepage; Online archive

Revista Chilena de Entomología is a peer-reviewed scientific journal covering all aspects of entomology. It is published by the Sociedad Chilena de Entomología and the editor-in-chief is José Mondaca E. (Servicio Agrícola y Ganadero). The journal was established in 1951.

== Abstracting and indexing ==
The journal is abstracted and indexed in Biological Abstracts, BIOSIS Previews, CAB Abstracts, and The Zoological Record.
