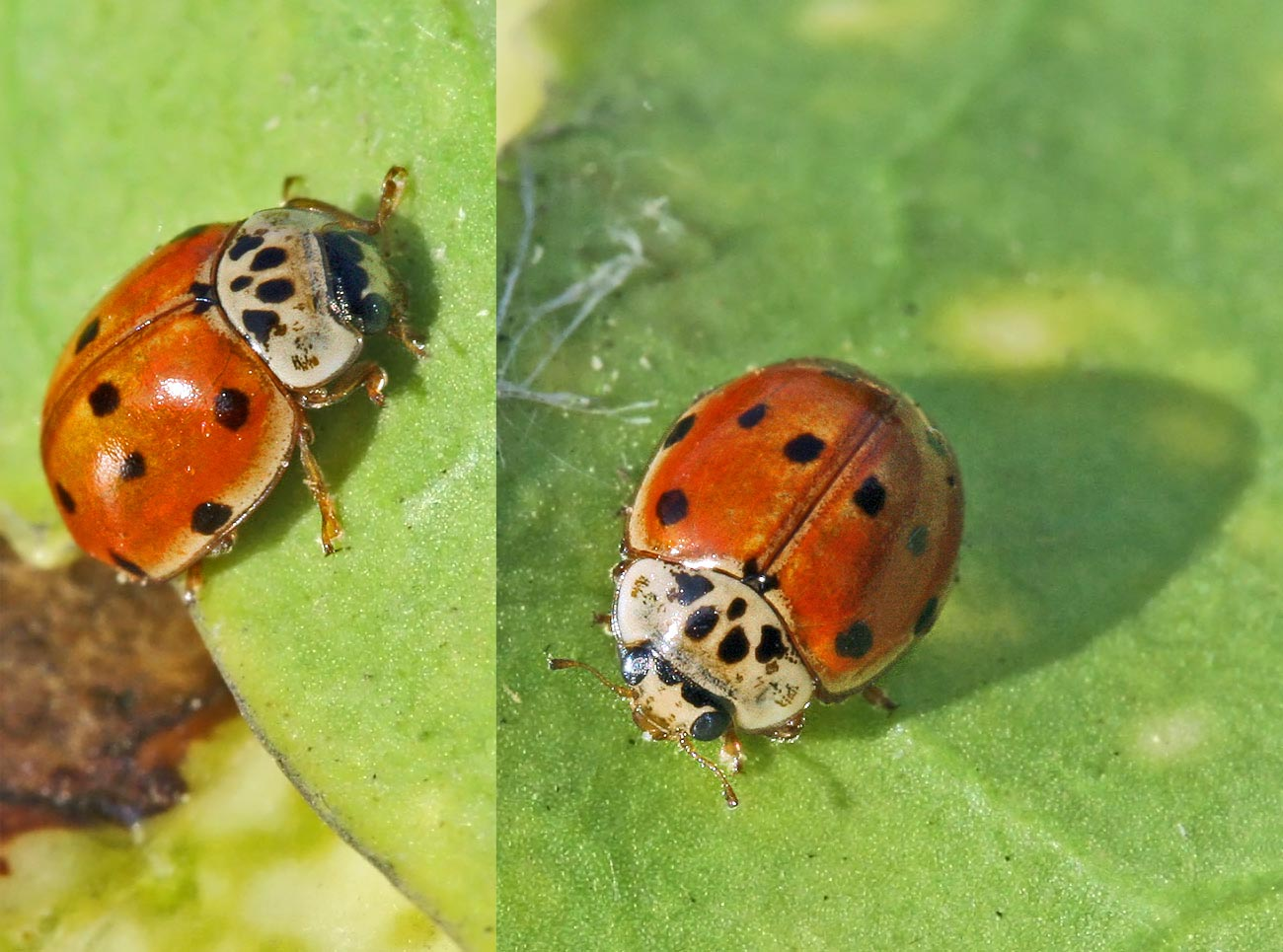
- Adalia decempunctata. Forma typica
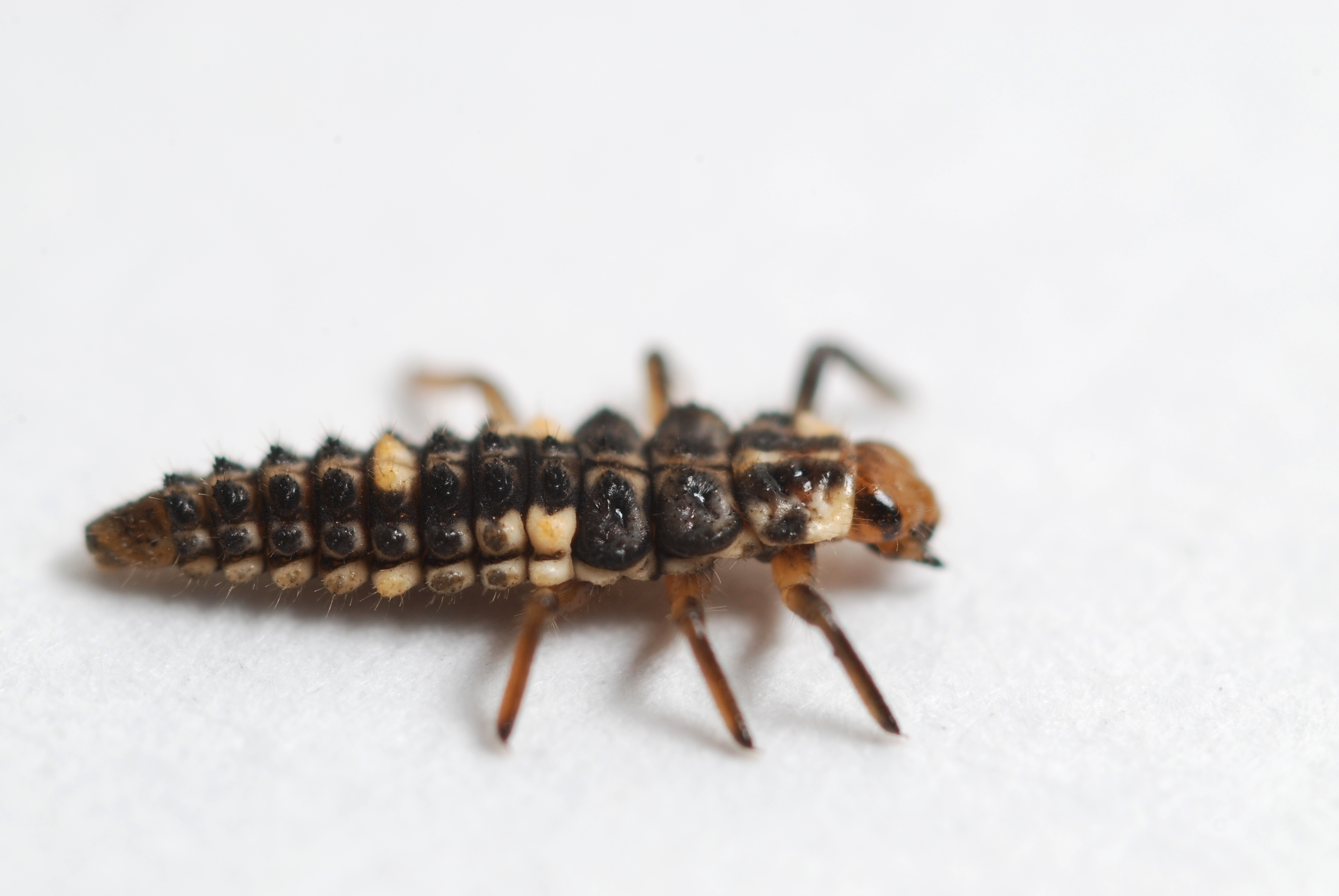
- Larva of Adalia decempunctata

Conservation status
- Least Concern (IUCN 2.3)

Scientific classification
- Kingdom: Animalia
- Phylum: Arthropoda
- Clade: Pancrustacea
- Class: Insecta
- Order: Coleoptera
- Suborder: Polyphaga
- Infraorder: Cucujiformia
- Family: Coccinellidae
- Genus: Adalia
- Species: A. decempunctata

Binomial name
- Adalia decempunctata (Linnaeus, 1758)

Synonyms
- List: Adalia (Adalia) decempunctata (Linnaeus, 1758); Coccinella decempunctata Linnaeus, 1758; Coccinella decempustulata Linnaeus, 1758; Coccinella guttatopunctata Linnaeus, 1758; Coccinella bimaculata Pontoppidan, 1763; Coccinella quadripunctata Linnaeus, 1767; Coccinella sexpunctata Linnaeus, 1767; Coccinella tredecimmaculata Forster, 1771; Coccinella octopunctata Fabricius, 1775; Coccinella pantherina DeGeer, 1775; Coccinella didyma O.F. Müller, 1776; Coccinella austriaca Schrank, 1777; Coccinella flava Goeze, 1777; Coccinella variabilis Fabricius, 1777; Coccinella subpunctata Schrank, 1781; Coccinella bipustulata Herbst, 1783; Coccinella humeralis Schaller, 1783; Coccinella marginata Thunberg, 1784; Coccinella tredecimnotata Thunberg, 1784; Coccinella bimaculosa Herbst, 1786; Coccinella biguttata Fabricius, 1787; Coccinella limbata Gmelin, 1790; Coccinella lunigera Brahm, 1790; Coccinella mutabilis Gmelin, 1790; Coccinella thunbergi Gmelin, 1790; Coccinella ulmi Olivier, 1791; Coccinella unifasciata Scriba, 1791; Coccinella varians Olivier, 1791; Coccinella lutea Rossi, 1794; Coccinella marginella Thunberg, 1795; Coccinella sexmaculata Thunberg, 1795; Coccinella similata Thunberg, 1795; Coccinella tricuspis Thunberg, 1795; Coccinella lunularis Marsham, 1802; Coccinella marginepunctata Marsham, 1802; Coccinella curvipustulata Haworth, 1812; Coccinella lunaepustulata Haworth, 1812; Coccinella clathrata Schaufuss, 1862

= Adalia decempunctata =

Ten-spotted lady beetle

Species of beetle

Adalia decempunctata, the ten-spotted ladybird or ten-spotted lady beetle, is a carnivorous beetle of the family Coccinellidae.

The ten-spotted ladybird was one of the many species originally described by Carl Linnaeus in his 18th-century work, Systema Naturae, its original name was Coccinella decempunctata. Its specific name from the Latin decem "ten", and punctata "spotted".

== Varietas ==
Varietas include:

- Adalia decempunctata var. lutea (Rossi)
- Adalia decempunctata var. quattuorpunctata (Linnaeus)
- Adalia decempunctata var. octopunctata Müller
- Adalia decempunctata var. lateripunctata Gradl.
- Adalia decempunctata var. humeralis Schaller
- Adalia decempunctata var. guttatopunctata (Linnaeus)
- Adalia decempunctata var. decempustulata (Linnaeus)
- Adalia decempunctata var. bipustulata Herbst

== Distribution ==
Adalia decempunctata is a common Palearctic species found in Europe, North Africa, European Russia, the Caucasus, Siberia, Belarus, Ukraine, Moldova, Transcaucasia and western Asia.

== Description ==
Adalia decempunctata can reach a body length of about 3.5–5 mm (0.14–0.20 in). This species is highly variable. Individuals may in fact have a red, orange or brown ground colour and between 0 and 12 distinct dark elytral spots, although rarely more spots have been recorded, up to 15 spots. These beetles have a glabrous body, with an almost round form. Legs and antennae are usually brown or orange. The species includes eight varietas, with three basic forms. The light form shows five to seven black spots on the pronotum and several black spots on the red-orange elytra. The dark form is mainly black or brown in color, and the pronotum has a light border on the sides and front. The mixed form has black or brown in color elytra, each with five orange to red spots. Sometimes these ladybirds have no spots at all.

== Biology ==
It occurs in western European broadleaf forests eastern deciduous forests, Sarmatic mixed forests, at forest edges, and in parks and gardens wastelands and in Eurasian Steppe, Pannonian Steppe biotopes. It is found on bushes and deciduous trees, on grasses, under bark, in moss on trees, in leaf litter, on brushwood, coarse woody debris and in alluvial soil.

The insects feed on aphids on trees and bushes. The adults overwinter in litter and among fallen leaves.

== Gallery ==
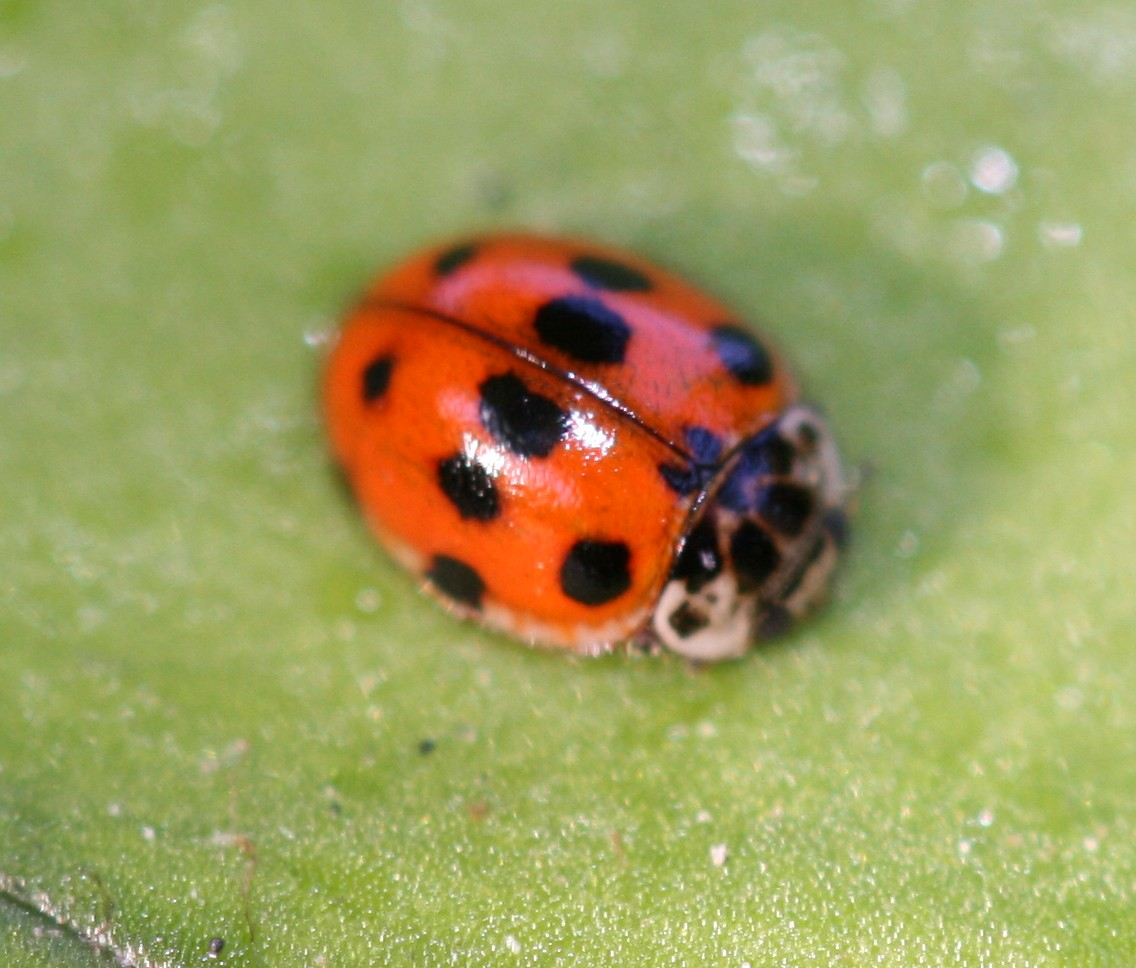
Adalia decempunctata decempunctata

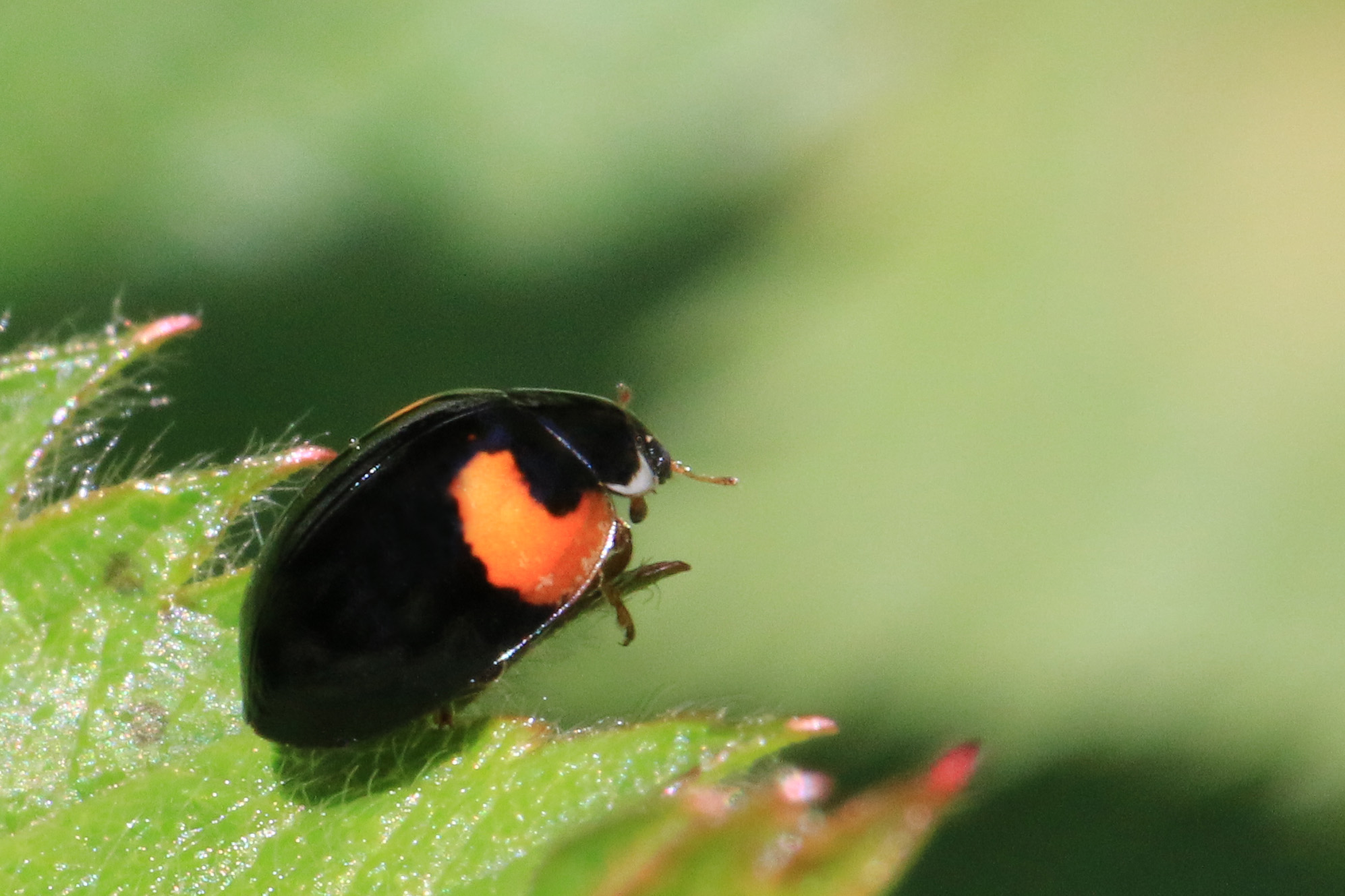
Adalia decempunctata var. bipustulata

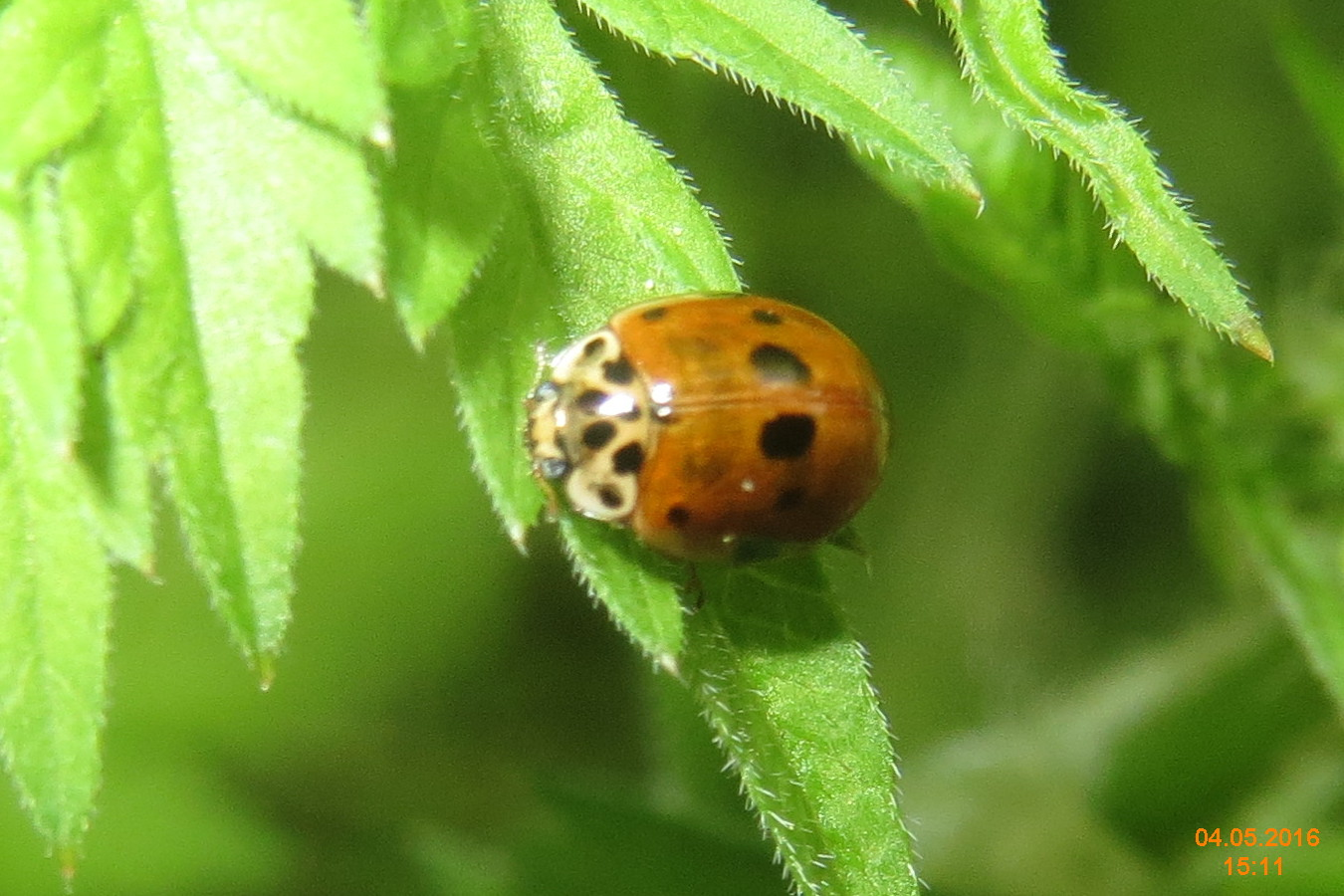
Adalia decempunctata var. octopunctata

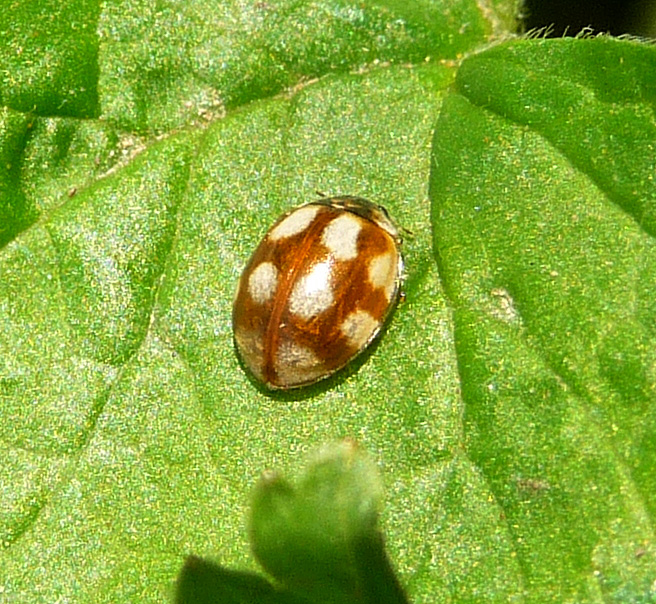
Adalia decempunctata var. guttatopunctata

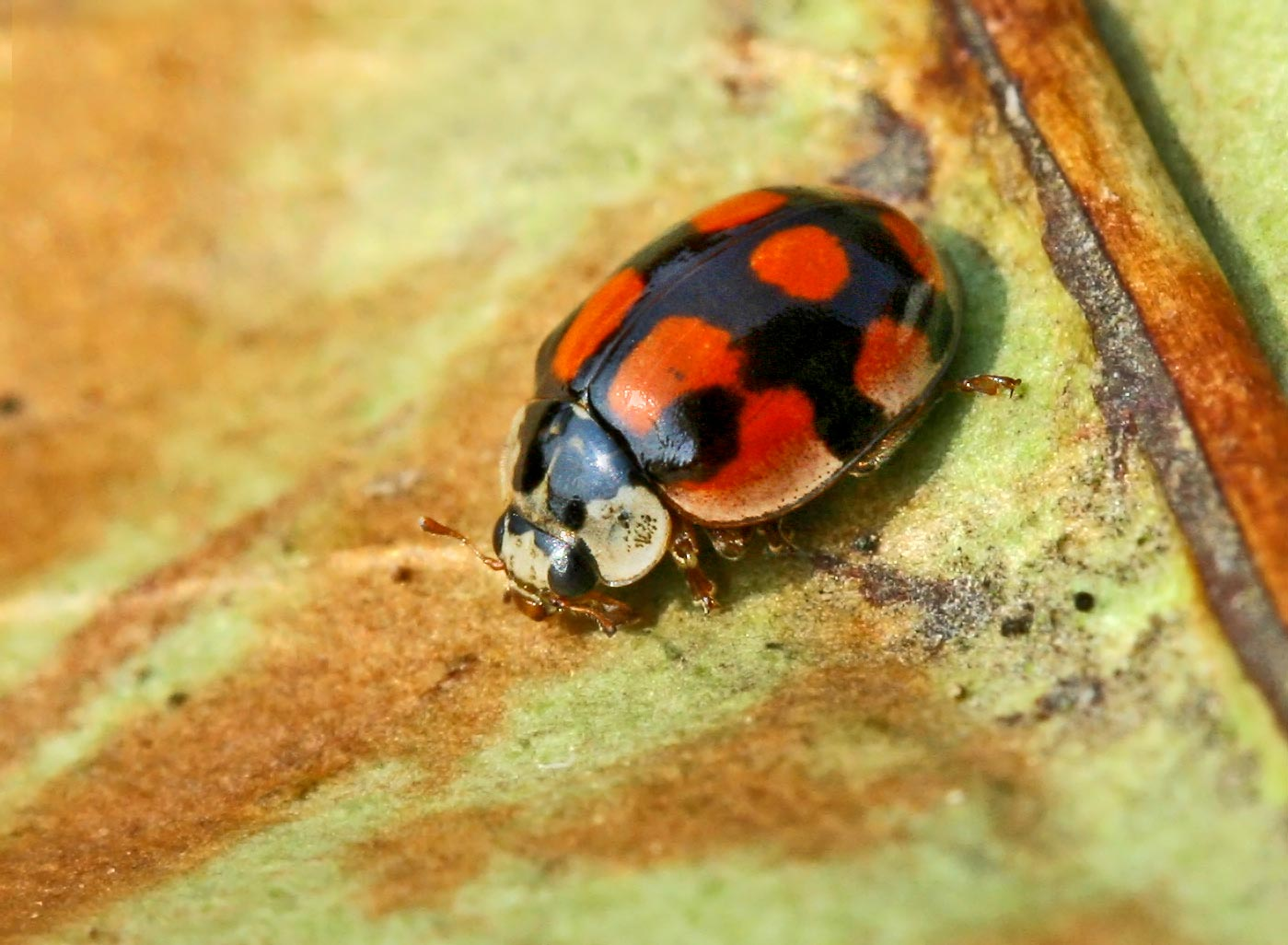
Dark variant

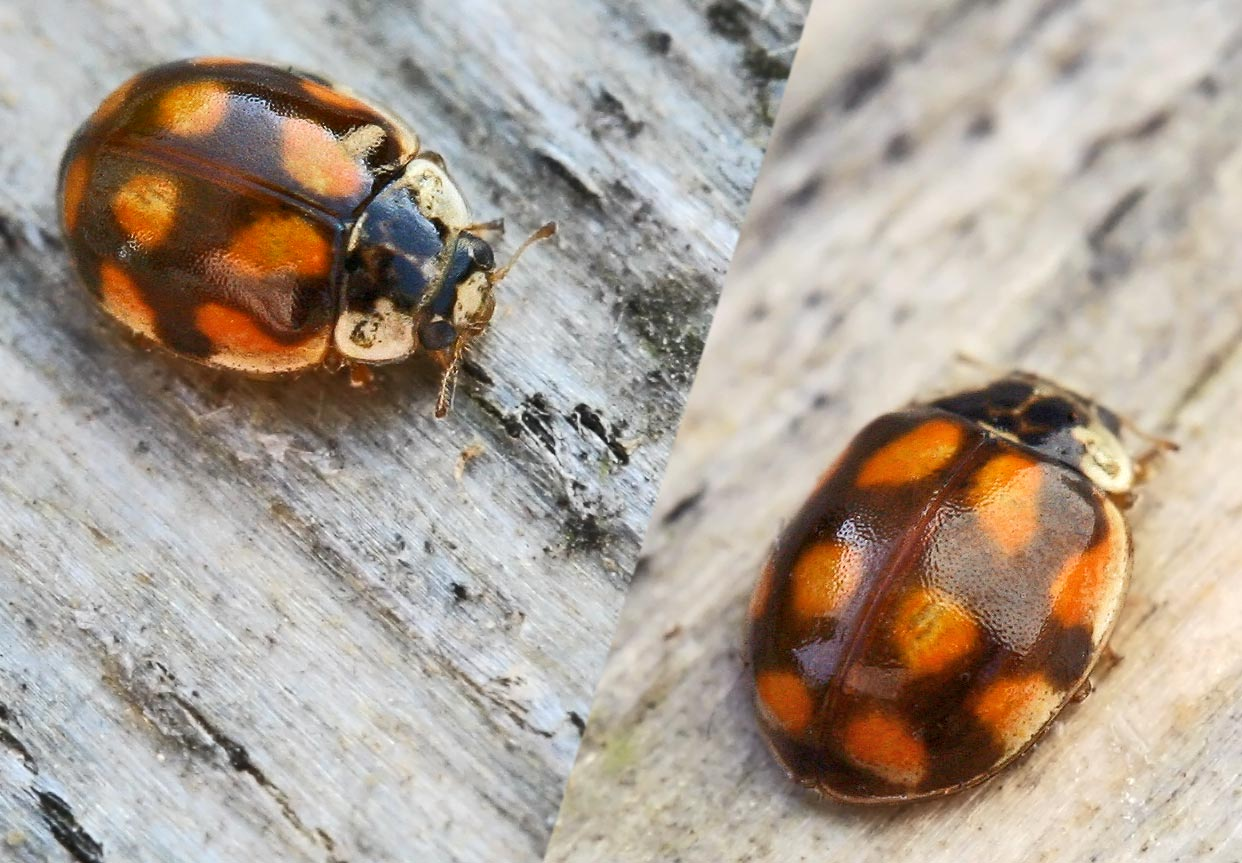
Unusual form

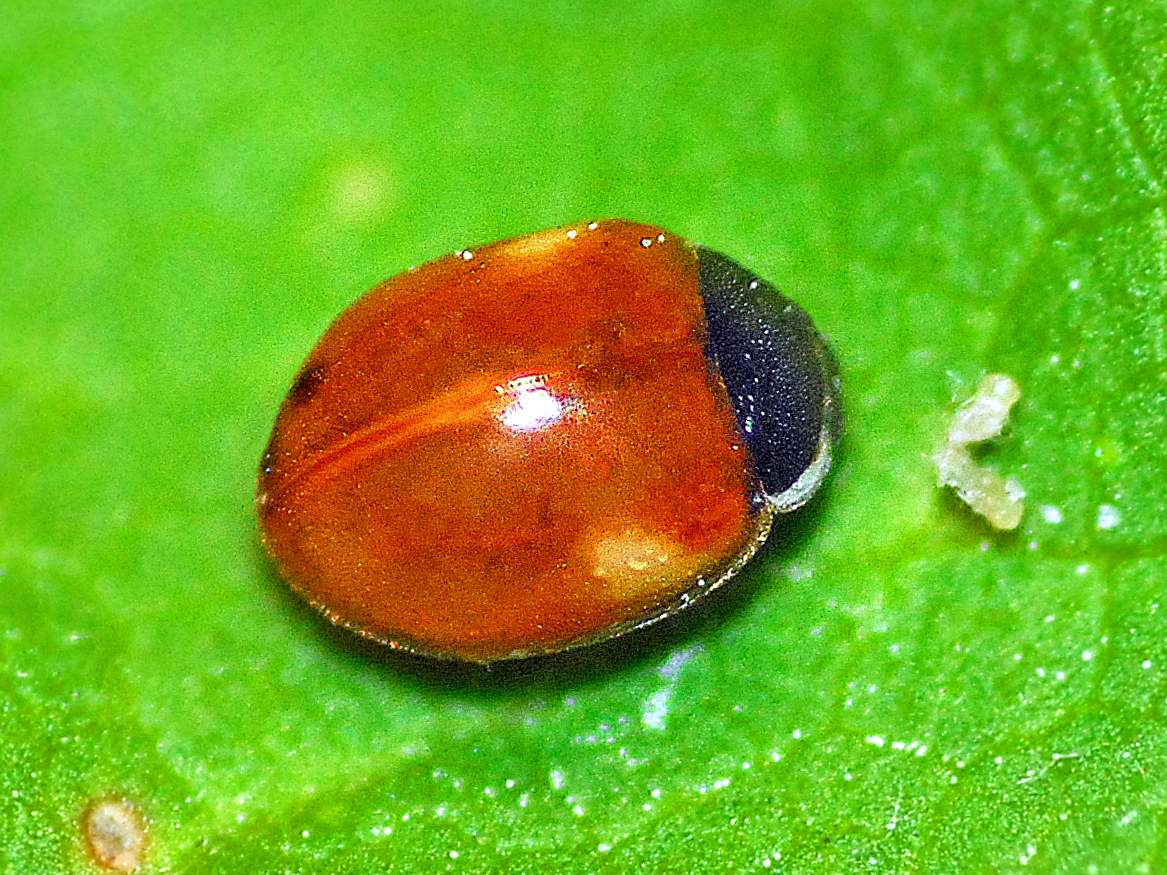
Unusual form

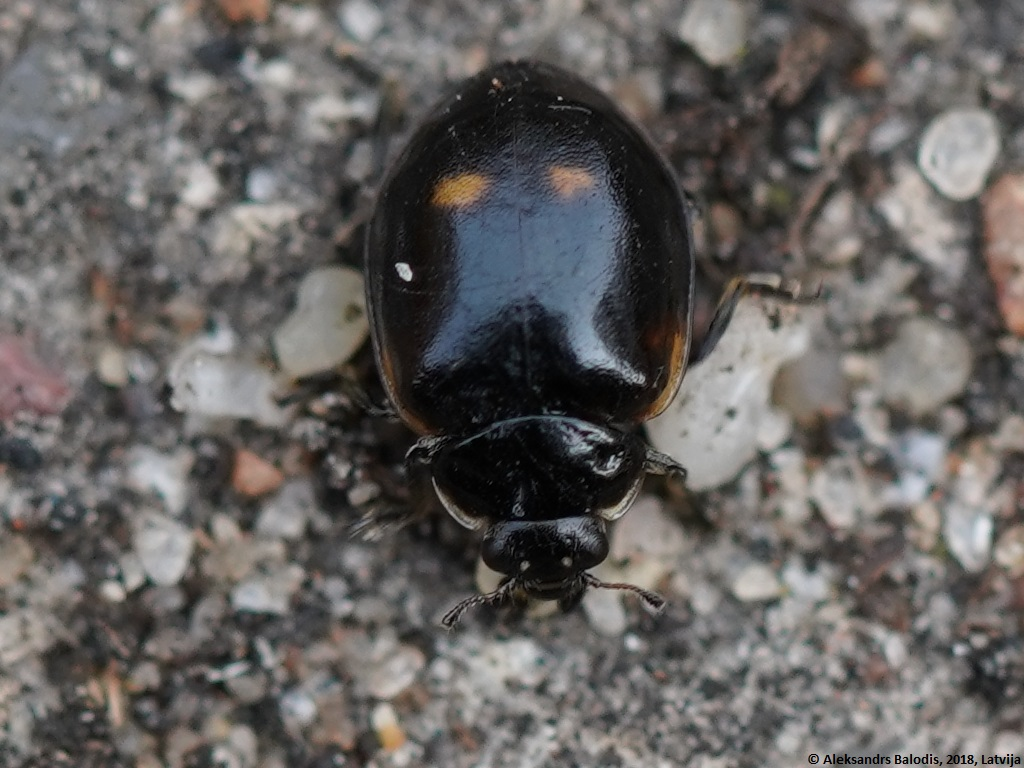
Unusual form
