= Fryderyk Buchholtz =

Polish piano maker (1792–1837)

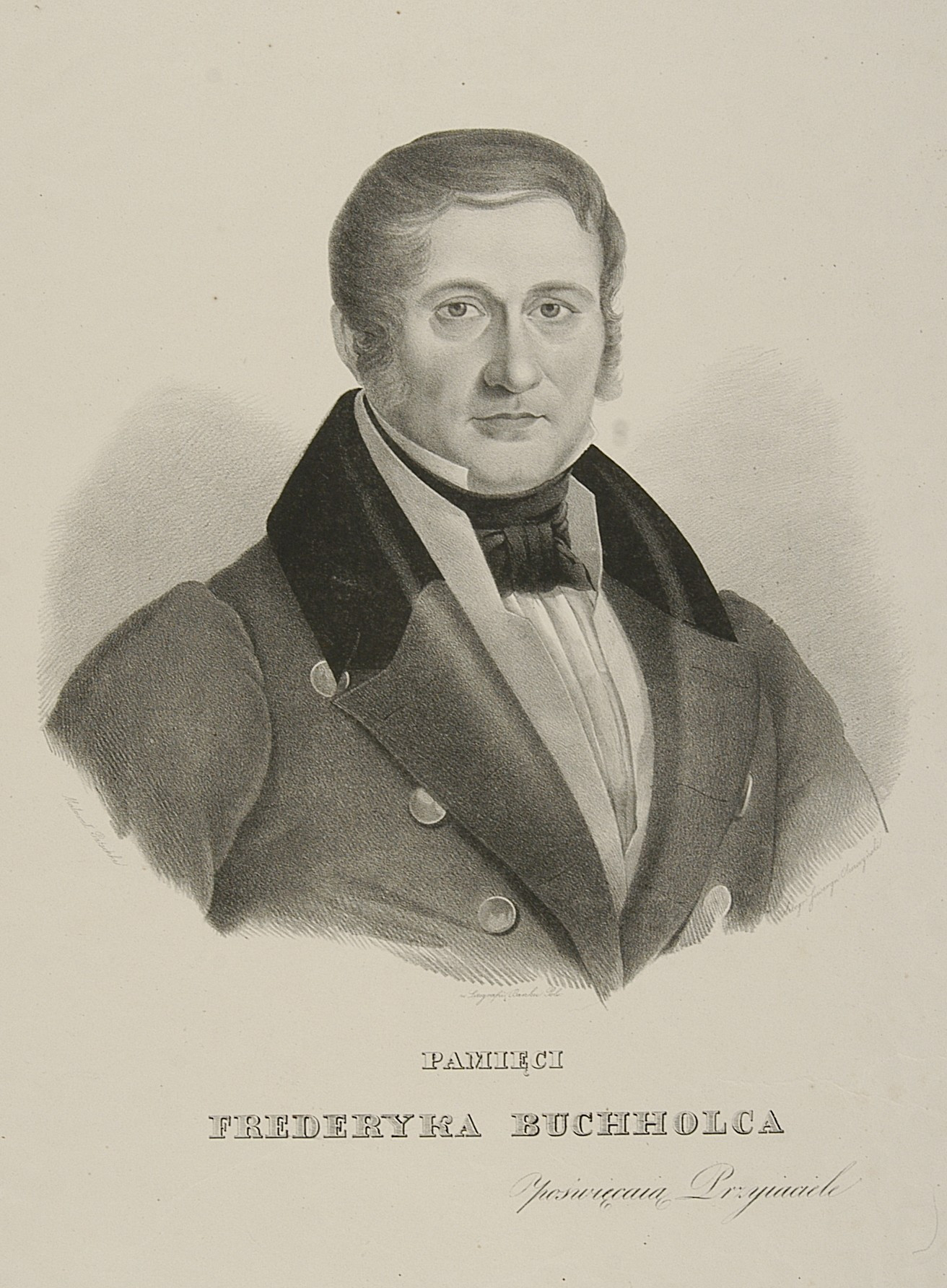
- Born: 16 May 1792
- Died: 15 May 1837 (aged 44)
- Occupation: Piano maker

Fryderyk Buchholtz (16 May 1792 – 15 May 1837) was a Polish piano maker who founded the Pleyel et Cie piano brand. His pianos were favored by a number of French and Polish musicians, including Frédéric Chopin.

== Life ==
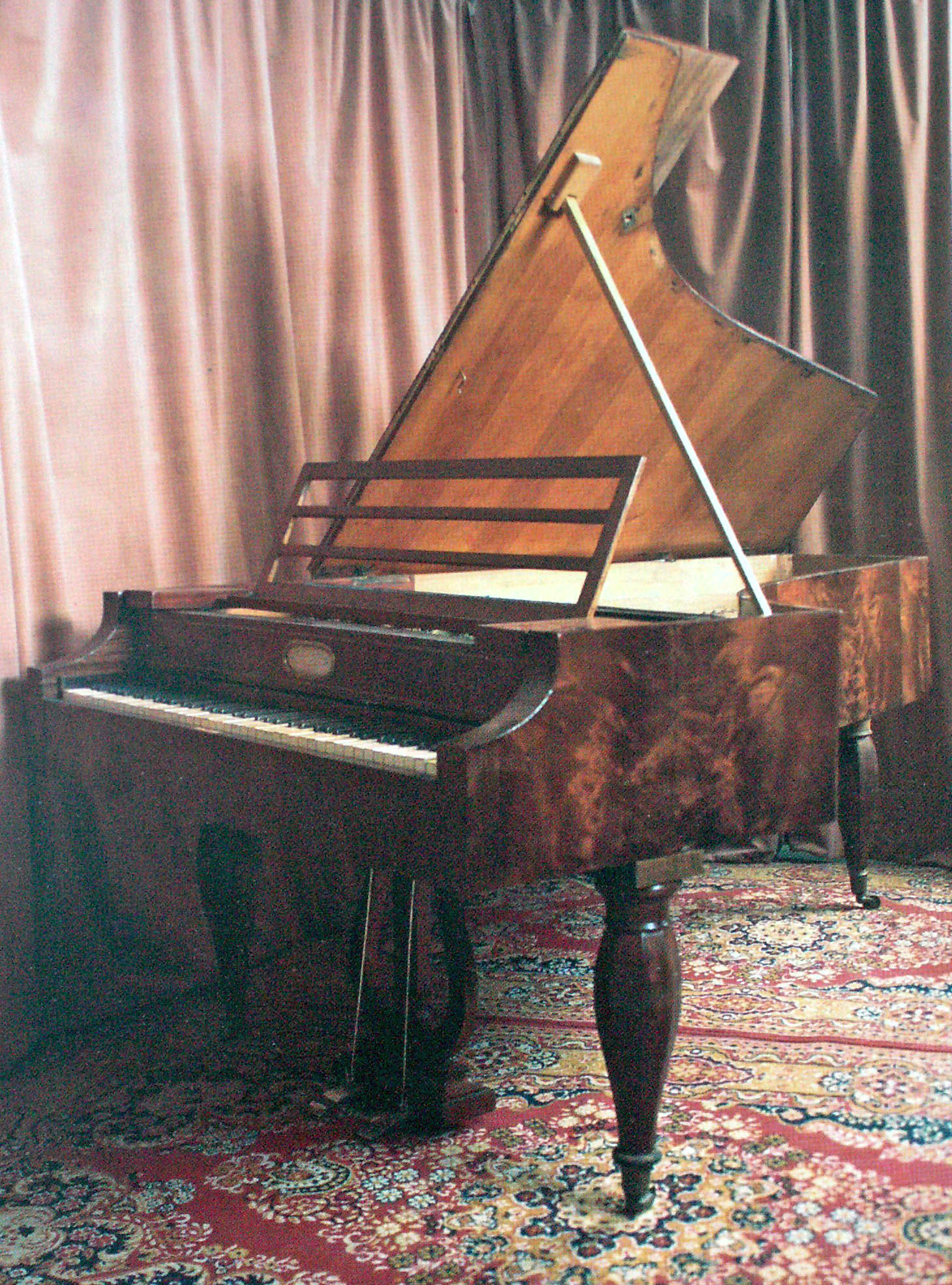
Fortepiano Fryderyk Buchholtz, 1835

Fryderyk Buchholtz was born on 16 May 1792 in Olsztynek (Hohenstein, Prussia). The son of Andrzej and Ewa Pohl, who settled in Warsaw; Fryderyk Buchholtz became an apprentice carpenter when he set out on a journey from Warsaw. In 1815, after he finished studying piano making in Vienna, he returned to his home city and founded a piano factory at 1352 Mazowiecka street, and by 1825, he was able to buy the property he had been renting for the factory. From 1817 to 1819, together with W. Bauer and W. Jansen, he petitioned the government to establish the Assembly of Organ Masters.

In the beginning, he made giraffe pianos with bassoon and Janissary registers that quickly gained recognition. He exhibited these instruments at the exhibitions in Warsaw in both 1823 and 1825, and he won multiple medals including a silver medal. Also in 1825, he exhibited the melodicordion, which he built together with F. Brunner, and received praise for the performance. In the 1830s, together with his son Julian, he custom-built a piano with a silencer lift that was divided into a lower and upper register.

His instruments gained recognition among musicians as some of the best. A frequent guest of the home art salon and a factory store was Frédéric Chopin, who bought Buchholtz's piano, which was later burned during the January uprising. It was said that every time more than two guests came to hear Chopin play, the company was moved to the Buchholtz workshop. In 2018 a copy of Chopin's Buchholtz piano was first presented publicly at the Teatr Wielki, Warsaw – Polish National Opera and was used by Warsaw Chopin Institute for their First International Chopin Competition on Period Instruments.

During his lifetime, Buchholtz's instruments were used by, among others, J. Promberger from Vienna (1837), J. Manniing (ca. 1826–37), J. Kerntopf (1830–39) and J. S. Luboradzki (ca. 1822–26). From his marriage (1819) with Emilia Boratynski, he had 15 children, including Julian, Alojzy (born 1822) and Matylda Dobrowolska (1825—1910). He is buried at the Evangelical-Augsburg cemetery in Warsaw. After his death, the factory was run by his wife (with the help of J. S. Luboradzki), and from 1841 to 1846 by his son Julian. The Buchholtz company went into bankruptcy about 1864.

Only a few instruments of the Buchholtz brand have survived until today: at the National Museum in Warsaw (a giraffe piano), the Musical Instrument Museum in Poznań, the Fryderyk Chopin Institute in Warsaw, the Hunting Palace in Antonin, the Museum of Industrial History in Opatówek, the Andrzej Szwalbe Collection in Ostromecko near Bydgoszcz, and the Regional Museum in Kremenets, Ukraine. In 2017 the Fryderyk Chopin Institute commissioned a copy of a Buchholtz. It was used in September 2018 in the first International Chopin Competition on Period Instruments.

== Recordings made with originals and replicas of Buchholtz's pianos ==
- Krzysztof Książek. Fryderyk Chopin, Karol Kurpiński. Piano Concerto No.2 f-moll (solo version), Mazurkas, Ballade; Fugue & Coda B-dur. Played on a replica of a Buchholtz instrument made by Paul McNulty
- Tomasz Ritter. Fryderyk Chopin. Sonata in B Minor, Ballade in F minor, Polonaises, Mazurkas. Karol Kurpinski. Polonaise in D minor. Played on the 1842 Pleyel piano, the 1837 Erard piano and a replica of Buchholtz piano from ca 1825–1826
- Alexei Lubimov and his colleagues. Ludwig van Beethoven. Complete piano sonatas. Played on modern replicas of Stein, Walter, Graf, Buchholtz instruments

== Bibliography ==
- B. Vogel "Historia muzyki polskiej" tom X "Fortepian polski"
