= Pleyel et Cie =

French piano manufacturer

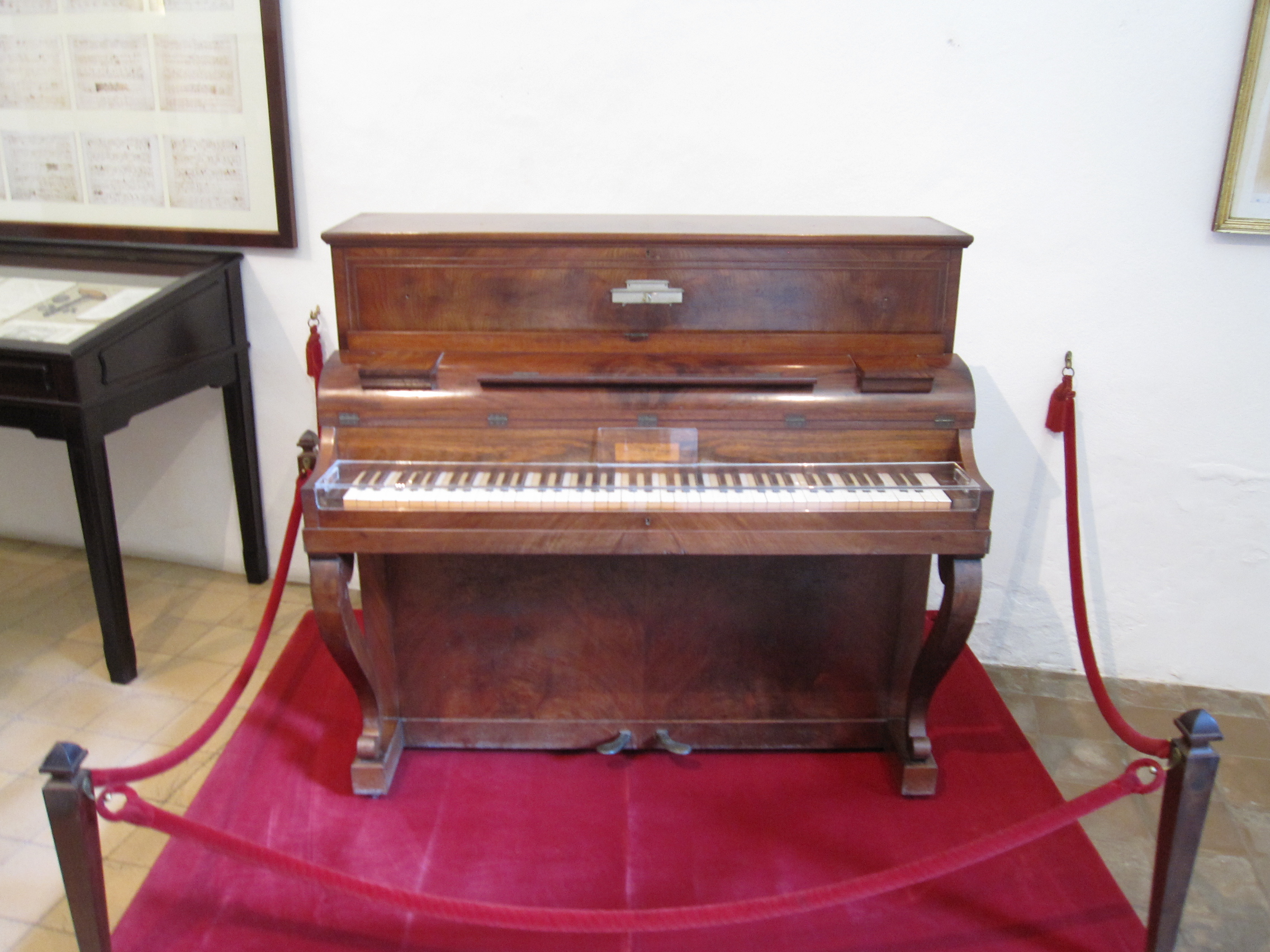
Chopin's Pleyel piano in Cell No. 4 in Valldemossa Charterhouse in Mallorca, one of only two in the world.

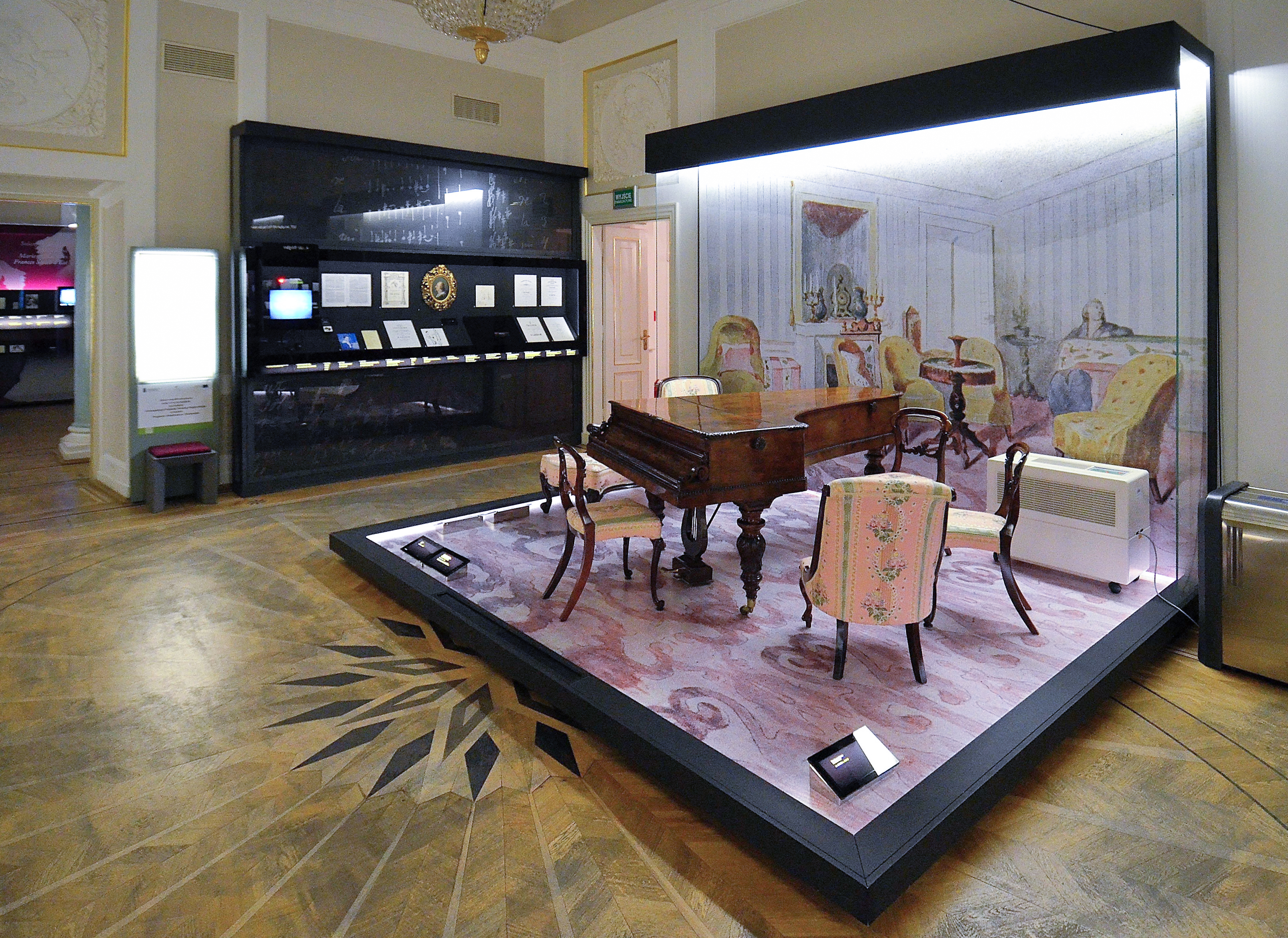
Chopin's last piano made by the Pleyel company (no 14810) displayed in the Fryderyk Chopin Museum in Warsaw; Chopin played and composed on this instrument in 1848–1849

Pleyel et Cie (transl. Pleyel and company) is a French piano manufacturing firm founded by the composer Ignace Pleyel in 1807. In 1815, Pleyel's son Camille joined him as a business partner. The firm provided pianos to Frédéric Chopin, who considered Pleyel pianos to be "non plus ultra". Pleyel et Cie. also operated a concert hall, the Salle Pleyel, where Chopin performed his first – and last – Paris concerts. Pleyel's major contribution to piano development was the first use of a metal frame in a piano. Pleyel pianos were the choice of composers such as Chopin, Debussy, Saint-Saëns, Ravel, de Falla and Stravinsky and of pianists and teachers Alfred Cortot, Philip Manuel and Gavin Williamson. Nineteenth-century musicians involved in the company's management included Joseph O'Kelly and Georges Pfeiffer.

== History ==
Around 1815, Pleyel was the first to introduce the short, vertically strung cottage upright piano, or "pianino" to France, adapting the design made popular in Britain by Robert Wornum. Their pianos were such a success that in 1834 the company employed 250 workers and produced 1000 pianos annually.

The company's success led them to invest in experiments, resulting in the double piano in 1890, invented by Hungarian composer Emánuel Moór. Although not the first company to experiment with building two pianos into the same frame, Pleyel's instrument, patented as the "Duo-Clave", was by far the most successful and produced the largest instruments. The company manufactured a very small number of double pianos in the 1890s and continued to make them until the 1920s. CDs can be bought today of performances on some of these pianos.

Towards the end of the 19th century, the Pleyel firm produced the first chromatic harp.

In the early 20th century, performances by Wanda Landowska helped revive interest in the harpsichord.

In 1913, Pleyel built the "Jungle Piano" for use by Albert Schweitzer in his hospital in Lambaréné (French Equatorial Africa – now Gabon). It was fitted with pedal attachments (to operate like an organ pedal-keyboard) and built with tropical woods that would acclimate to conditions there.

In the early 1920s, Pierre Hans (1886-1960), an engineer with very thick fingers, commissioned Pleyel to build a piano he designed with an upper keyboard and a lower keyboard tuned a half tone apart, which became known as the Hans piano. Pleyel produced several Hans pianos, but they fell out of use after World War II.

Pleyel also pioneered the player piano with the Pleyela line of pianos. These were often small pianos of an unusual design.

== Today ==
Pleyel continued to manufacture pianos through 2013, under the corporate auspices of the French Piano Manufacturing Company ("Manufacture Française de Pianos, Cie."). In the 1980s, the Pleyel company bought out the Erard and Gaveau piano companies which also manufactured pianos in France. The Pleyel pianos of today incorporated improvements of these companies and others. In the last two decades, the company was bought by the same family which had bought the Salle Pleyel concert hall in order to revive the name Pleyel. They built a new factory in the south of France and started making a line of newly designed and improved pianos. Then, in 2008, they decided to downsize the factory and lines of pianos. They moved the factory back to Paris and opened a new factory where they began introducing new pianos designed by famous designers. The red spruce used by Pleyel came from the Fiemme Valley in Trentino, Italy. After full assembly of a piano, the instrument received a further 30–40 hours of fine-tuning.

At the end of 2013, the company announced it would cease manufacturing pianos. In 2017, Pleyel was bought by Algam, a company based in Nantes, France. Algam has invested heavily in the brand and production of new Pleyel pianos has now recommenced making Pleyel the oldest piano company in the world which is still producing pianos.

== 2009 replica ==
In September 2009, the company produced a replica of the Pleyel piano, produced in 1830, that was used by Fryderyk Chopin. The original, which is now in the collection of the Fryderyk Chopin Institute in Warsaw, was used as the source for the plans for this replica. This replica was used in The 1st International Chopin Competition on Period Instruments in September 2018.

== Recordings made with originals and replicas of Pleyel et Cie pianos ==
- Yuan Sheng. Frederic Chopin. Ballades Nos 1-4/Impromptus Nos 1-4. Played on the 1845 Pleyel piano. Label: Piano Classics
- Ronald Brautigam. Felix Mendelssohn. Piano Concertos. Played on a copy of the 1830 Pleyel piano made by Paul McNulty. Label: Bis
- Janusz Olejniczak. Chopin evening around 1831 Pleyel.
- Alexei Lubimov. Chopin, Bach, Mozart, Beethoven: at Chopin’s home piano. Played on the original 1843 upright Pleyel piano. Label: NIFCCD
- Dina Yoffe. Fryderyk Chopin. Piano Concertos No 1 & 2. Version for one piano. Played on the 1848 Pleyel and the 1838 Erard pianos. Label: Fryderyk Chopin Institute
- Viviana Sofronitsky, Sergei Istomin. Frederyk Chopin. Complete works for cello and piano. Played on a replica of the 1830 Pleyel piano made in 2010 by Paul McNulty. Label: Passacaille
- Kevin Kenner. Fryderyk Chopin. 4 Impromptus. Played on the 1848 Pleyel piano. Label: Fryderyk Chopin Institute
- Tomasz Ritter. Fryderyk Chopin. Sonata in B Minor, Ballade in F minor, Polonaises, Mazurkas. Karol Kurpinski. Polonaise in D minor. Played on the 1842 Pleyel piano, the 1837 Erard piano and a copy of Buchholtz piano from ca 1825-1826 made by Paul McNulty. Label: Fryderyk Chopin Institute
- Kimiko Douglass-Ishizaka. Frederic Chopin. 24 Preludes. Played on the 1842 Pleyel piano. Released under a Creative Commons license.

== See also ==
- Auguste Wolff, company head from 1855 to 1887
