= Alexei Lubimov =

Russian pianist (b.1944)

Alexei Lubimov People's Artist of Russia
- Алексе́й Люби́мов
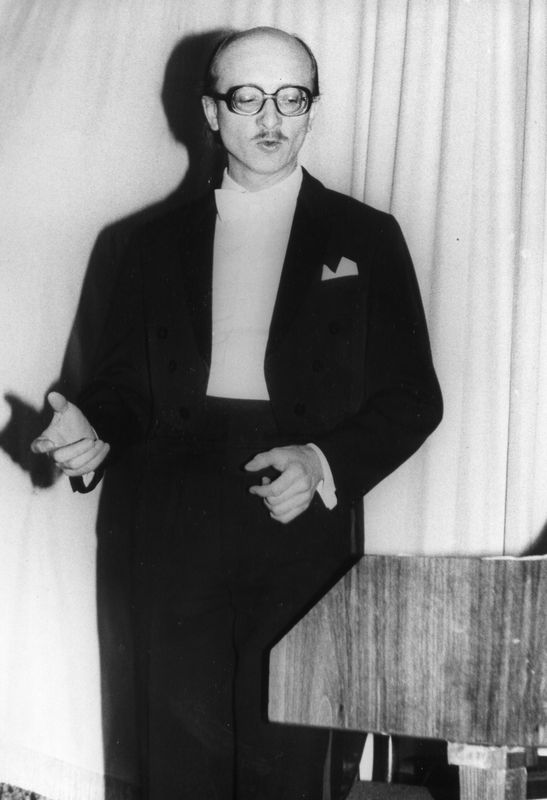
- Lubimov in 1984
- Born: 16 September 1944 (age 81–82); Moscow, Soviet Union
- Occupations: Classical pianist, fortepianist, harpsichordist.
- Years active: 1968–present
- Website: Record Company Biography

Alexei Borisovich Lubimov (Russian: Алексе́й Бори́сович Люби́мов; born 16 September 1944) is a Russian pianist, fortepianist and harpsichordist, People's Artist of Russia.

Lubimov studied at the Moscow Conservatory with Heinrich Neuhaus and Lev Naumov. After successes in several competitions, he gave the premieres in the Soviet Union of several pieces by composers such as Arnold Schoenberg, Karlheinz Stockhausen, Pierre Boulez and György Ligeti. His commitment to western music was criticised by the Soviet authorities and he was prevented from leaving the Soviet Union for several years, during which time he concentrated on working with period instruments. He is a founder of the Moscow Baroque Quartet and the Moscow Chamber Academy (with Tatiana Grindenko) as well as the music festival "Alternativa". Apart from giving solo recitals throughout the world and appearing with leading symphony orchestras, he works regularly with early music ensembles such as the Orchestra of the Age of Enlightenment. Among his partners in chamber music are Andreas Staier, Natalia Gutman, Peter Schreier, Heinrich Schiff, Christian Tetzlaff, Gidon Kremer, Ivan Monighetti, and Wieland Kuijken.

In 2003 he received the title of People's Artist of Russia.

In recent seasons he has given concerts with the London Philharmonic, City of Birmingham Symphony Orchestra, Russian National Orchestra in Moscow and the Tonkünstlerorchester. He toured with the Haydn Sinfonietta playing Mozart and played Haydn with the Camerata Salzburg under Sir Roger Norrington in New York and gave performances of Scriabin's Prometheus at the Salzburg Festival. In November 2010 he gave two recitals at Lincoln Center, returning in 2011 on tour with the Budapest Festival Orchestra conducted by Iván Fischer.

In April 2022, police raided an anti-war classical concert by Lubimov at a Moscow cultural centre, interrupting his performance. In dramatic fashion Lubimov finished playing the final bars of Schubert’s Impromptu Op 90 No 2 as two police officers took the stage.

== Recordings ==
- Alexei Lubimov. Chopin, Bach, Mozart, Beethoven. At Chopin’s home piano. Played on 1843 upright Pleyel piano. Label: NIFCCD
- Alexei Lubimov. Franz Schubert. Impromptus. Played on the 1810 Matthias Müller model piano and the 1830 Joseph Schantz piano. Label: Zig Zag Territorois.
- Alexei Lubimov and his colleagues (Yuri Martynov, Olga Martynova, Alexandra Koreneva, Elizaveta Miller, Olga Pashchenko, Alexey Zuev). Ludwig van Beethoven. Complete piano sonatas. Played on copies of Stein, Walter, Graf, Buchholtz instruments made by Paul McNulty. Label: Moscow Conservatory Records.
- Alexei Lubimov. Beethoven. Piano Sonatas - No.8, Op.13 “Pathetique”; No. 14, Op.27, No.2 “Moonlight”; No.21, Op.53 “Waldstein” in C Major; No.27. Recorded on an antique fortepiano John Broadwood & Son 1806 restored by Christopher Clarke. Label: Erato.
- Alexei Lubimov with Alexei Zuev. Claude Debussy. Preludes. Recorded on Steinway 1913 and Bechstein 1925. Label: ECM Records.
- Alexei Lubimov and Keller Quartett. Lento — Alfred Schnittke, Dmitri Shostakovich. Label: ECM Records.
- Dennis Russel Davies (conductor), Alexei Lubimov (piano), Radio Symphonieorchester Wien. Valentin Silvestrov: Metamusik/Postludum. Label: ECM Records.
