= Fortepiano =

Early version of the piano

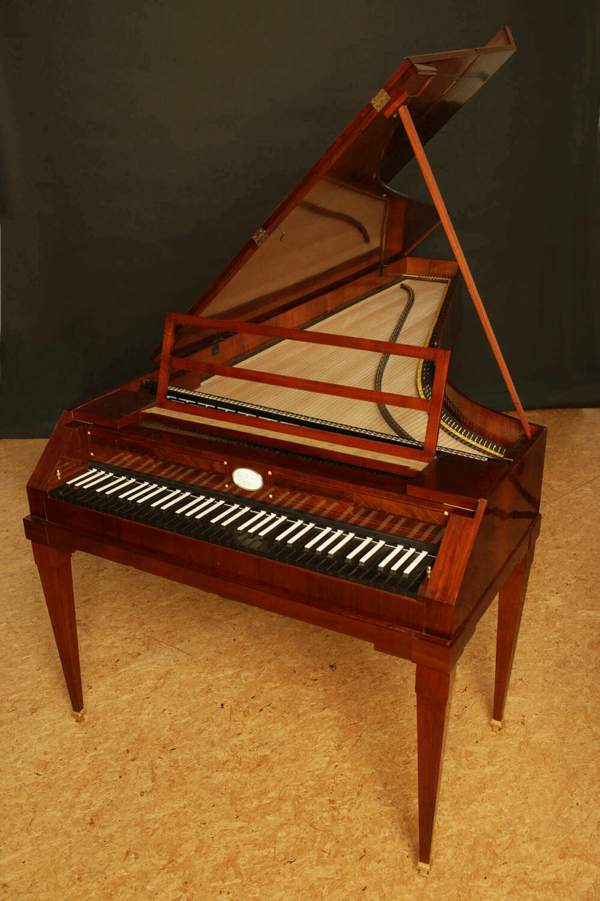
Fortepiano by Paul McNulty after Walter & Sohn, c. 1805

A fortepiano [ˌfɔrteˈpjaːno] is an early piano. In principle, the word "fortepiano" can designate any piano dating from the invention of the instrument by Bartolomeo Cristofori in 1700 up to the early 19th century. Most typically, however, it is used to refer to the mid-18th to early-19th century instruments, for which composers of the Classical era such as Haydn and Mozart wrote their piano music. Sometimes, the works of Beethoven and Schubert are likewise considered fortepiano music.

Starting in the late 18th century, the fortepiano began a period of steady evolution, culminating in the late 19th century with the modern grand. The earlier fortepiano became obsolete and was absent from the musical scene for many decades. In the later 20th century, the fortepiano was revived, following the rise of interest in historically informed performance. Fortepianos are built for that purpose, in specialist workshops.

== Construction ==
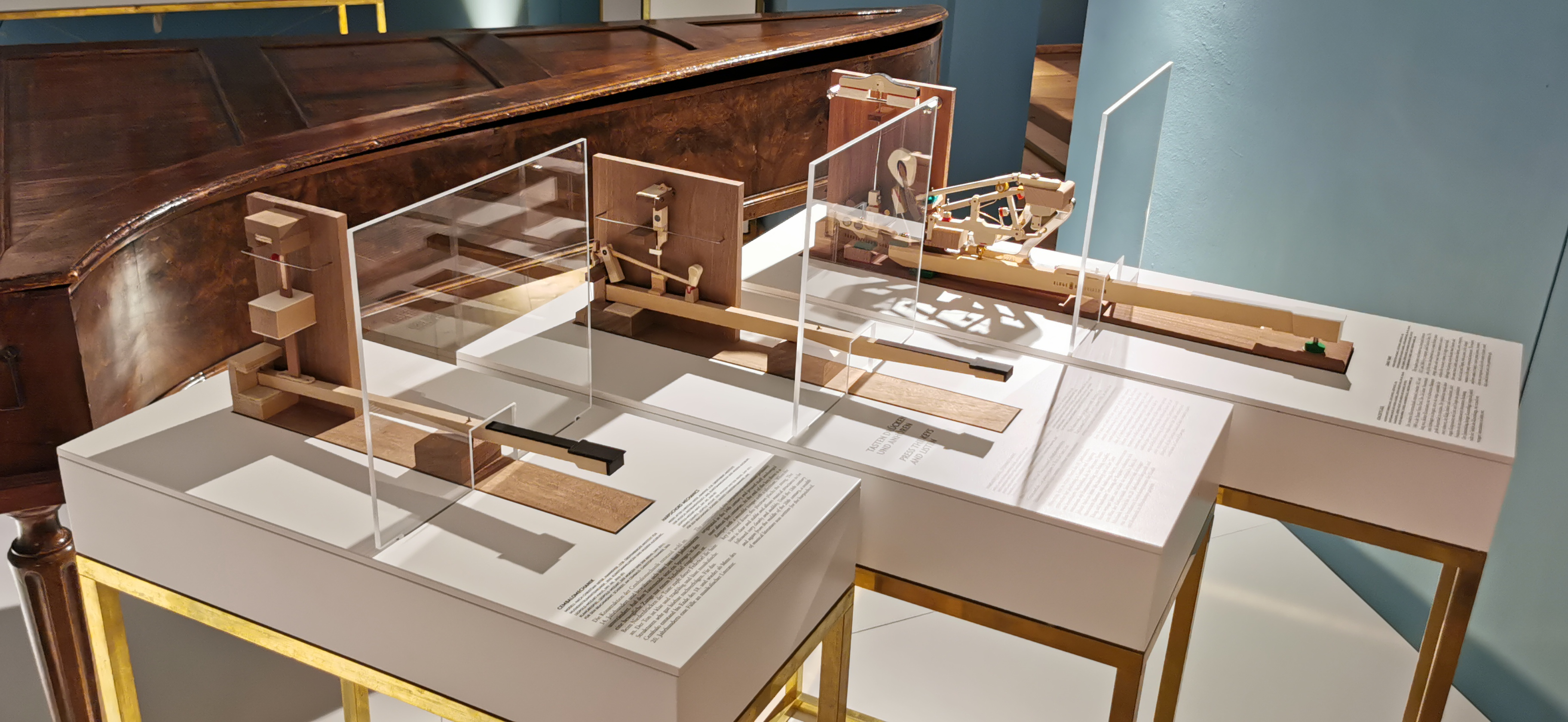
Museum Exhibit of inner wooden key (center) of Fortepiano

The fortepiano has leather-covered hammers and thin, harpsichord-like strings. It has a much lighter case construction than the modern piano and, except for later examples of the early nineteenth century (already evolving towards the modern piano), it has no metal frame or bracing. The action and hammers are lighter, giving rise to a much lighter touch, which in well-constructed fortepianos is also very expressive.

The process of the inner workings of a fortepiano was remarkably unique and intricate for the time. When a key is pressed the action (a series of levers and springs) moves the hammer which then hits the strings. This creates a vibration. Simultaneously, a felt damper moves away from the strings allowing for them to vibrate. When the key is released the damper returns and sound ceases.

The range of the fortepiano was about four octaves at the time of its invention and gradually increased. Mozart wrote his piano music for instruments of about five octaves. The piano works of Beethoven reflect a gradually expanding range; his last piano compositions are for an instrument of about six and a half octaves. The range of most modern pianos, attained in the 19th century, is 7 1/3 octaves.

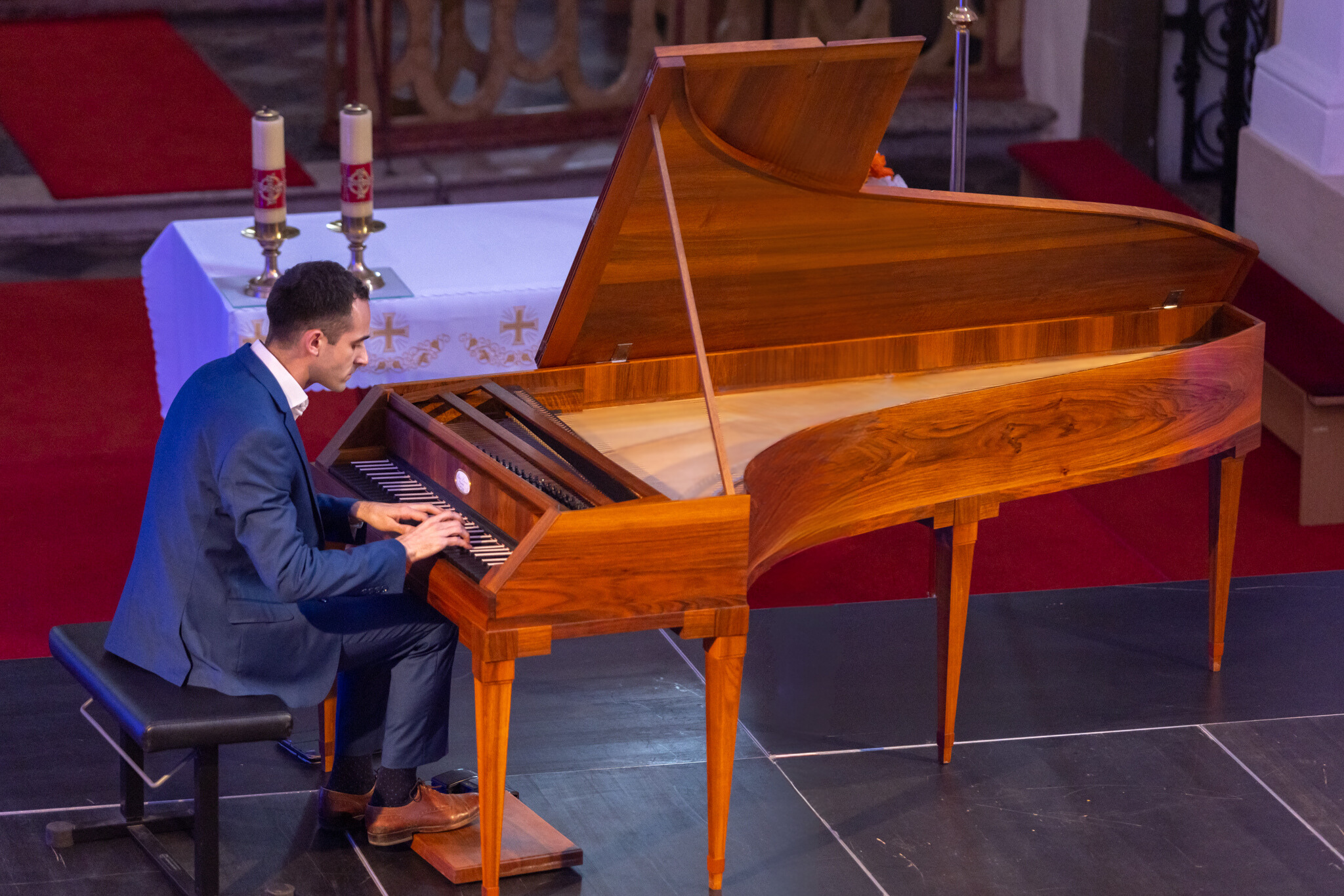
Danilo Mascetti, fortepiano specialist

Fortepianos from the start often had devices to change the resonance like the pedals of modern pianos, but they were not always pedals: sometimes hand stops or knee levers were used instead.

== Sound ==
Overture from Le calife de Bagdad (1809) by François-Adrien Boieldieu, played on a fortepiano

Like the modern piano, the fortepiano can vary the sound volume of each note, depending on the player's touch. The tone of the fortepiano is quite different from that of the modern piano, however, being softer, with less sustain. Sforzando accents tend to stand out more than on the modern piano, because they differ from softer notes in timbre as well as volume, and decay rapidly.

Fortepianos also tend to have quite different tone quality in their different registers – slightly buzzing in the bass, "tinkling" in the high treble, and more rounded (closest to the modern piano) in the mid range. In comparison, modern pianos are rather more uniform in tone through their range.

== History ==
=== Cristofori ===
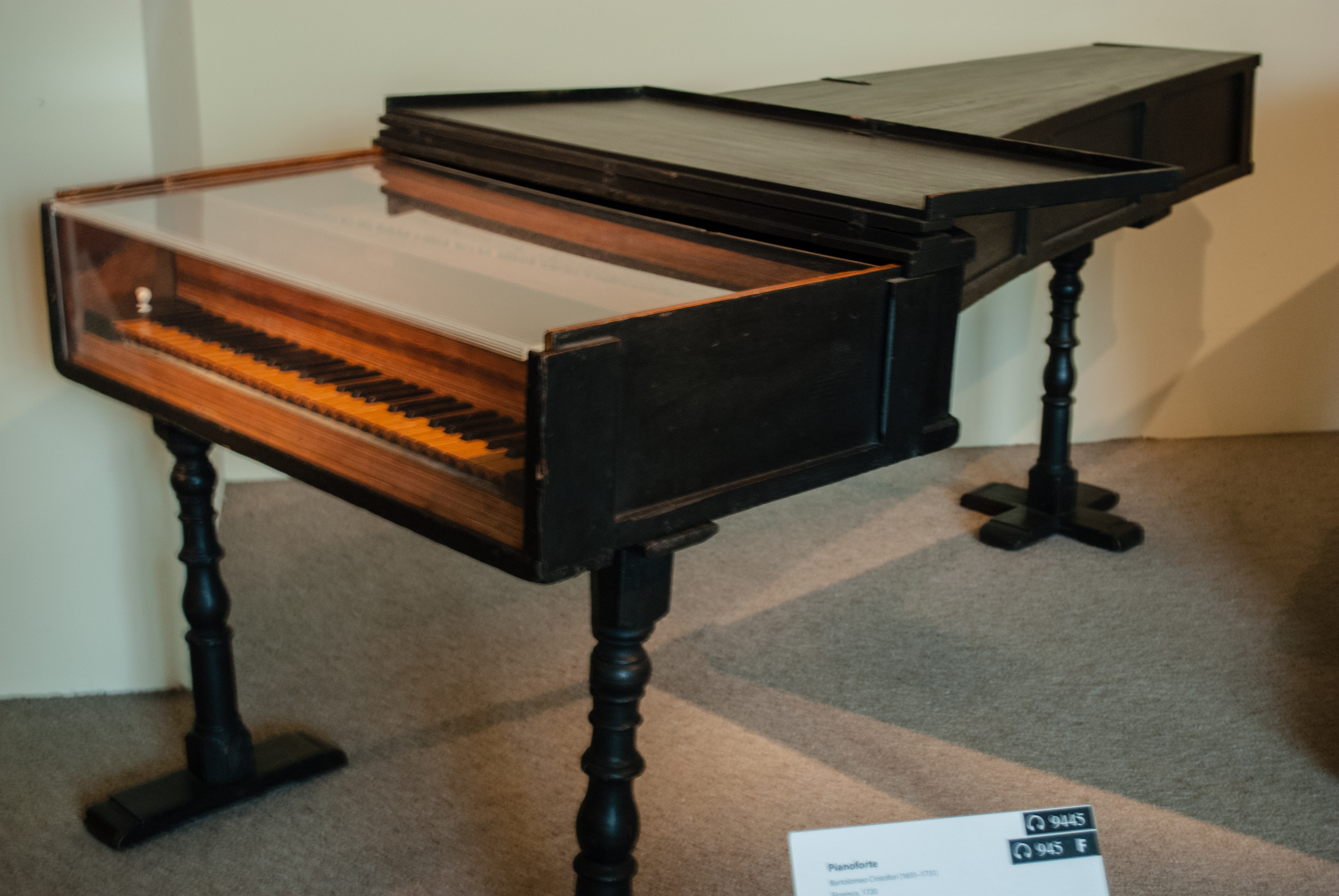
A 1720 fortepiano by Cristofori in the Metropolitan Museum of Art in New York City. It is the oldest surviving piano.

The piano was invented by the harpsichord maker Bartolomeo Cristofori in Florence. The first reliable record of his invention appears in the inventory of the Medici family (who were Cristofori's patrons), dated 1700. Cristofori continued to develop the instrument until the 1720s, the time from which the surviving three Cristofori instruments date.

Cristofori is perhaps best admired today for his ingenious piano action, which in some ways was more subtle and effective than that of many later instruments. However, other innovations were also needed to make the piano possible; merely attaching the Cristofori action to a harpsichord would have produced a very weak tone. Cristofori's instruments instead used thicker, tenser strings, mounted on a frame considerably more robust than that of contemporary harpsichords. As with virtually all later pianos, in Cristofori's instruments the hammers struck more than one string at a time; Cristofori used pairs of strings throughout the range.

Cristofori was also the first to incorporate a form of soft pedal into a piano, the mechanism by which the hammers are made to strike fewer than the maximum number of strings, for which Cristofori used a hand stop. It is not clear whether the modern soft pedal descends directly from Cristofori's work or arose independently.

Cristofori's invention attracted public attention as the result of a journal article written by Scipione Maffei and published in 1711 in Giornale de'letterati d'Italia of Venice. The article included a diagram of the action, the core of Cristofori's invention. That article was republished in 1719 in a volume of Maffei's work, and then in a German translation (1725) in Johann Mattheson's Critica Musica. The latter publication was perhaps the triggering event in the spread of the fortepiano to German-speaking countries (see below).

Cristofori's instrument spread quite slowly at first, probably because, being more elaborate and harder to build than a harpsichord, it was very expensive. For a time, the piano was the instrument of royalty, with Cristofori-built or -styled instruments played in the courts of Portugal and Spain. Several were owned by Queen Maria Barbara of Spain, who was the pupil of the composer Domenico Scarlatti. One of the first private individuals to own a piano was the castrato Farinelli, who inherited one from Maria Barbara on her death.

The first music specifically written for piano dates from this period: the Sonate da cimbalo di piano (1732) by Lodovico Giustini. That publication was an isolated phenomenon, and James Parakilas conjectures that the publication was meant as an honor for the composer on the part of his royal patrons. Certainly there could have been no commercial market for fortepiano music while the instrument continued to be an exotic specimen.

It appears that the fortepiano did not achieve full popularity until the 1760s, from which time the first records of public performances on the instrument are dated, and when music described as being for the fortepiano was first widely published.

=== Silbermann fortepianos ===
It was Gottfried Silbermann who brought the construction of fortepianos to the German-speaking nations. Silbermann, who worked in Freiberg in Germany, began to make pianos based on Cristofori's design around 1730. (His previous experience had been in building organs, harpsichords, and clavichords.) Like Cristofori, Silbermann had royal support, in his case from Frederick the Great of Prussia, who bought many of his instruments.

Silbermann's instruments were famously criticized by Johann Sebastian Bach around 1736, but later instruments encountered by Bach in his Berlin visit of 1747 apparently met with the composer's approval. It has been conjectured that the improvement in Silbermann's instruments resulted from his having seen an actual Cristofori piano, rather than merely reading Scipione Maffei's article. The piano action Maffei described does not match that found in surviving 18th-century instruments.

Silbermann is credited with the invention of the forerunner of the sustain pedal, which removes the dampers from all the strings at once, permitting them to vibrate freely. Silbermann's device was only a hand stop, and so could only be changed during a pause in the music. Throughout the Classical era, even when the more flexible knee levers or pedals had been installed, the lifting of all the dampers was used primarily as a coloristic device.

=== Viennese school of builders ===
The fortepiano builders who followed Silbermann introduced actions that were simpler than the Cristofori action, even to the point of lacking an escapement, the device that permits the hammer to fall to rest position even when the key has been depressed. Such instruments were the subject of criticism, particularly in a widely quoted 1777 letter from Mozart to his father, but were simple to make and were widely incorporated into square pianos.

==== Stein ====
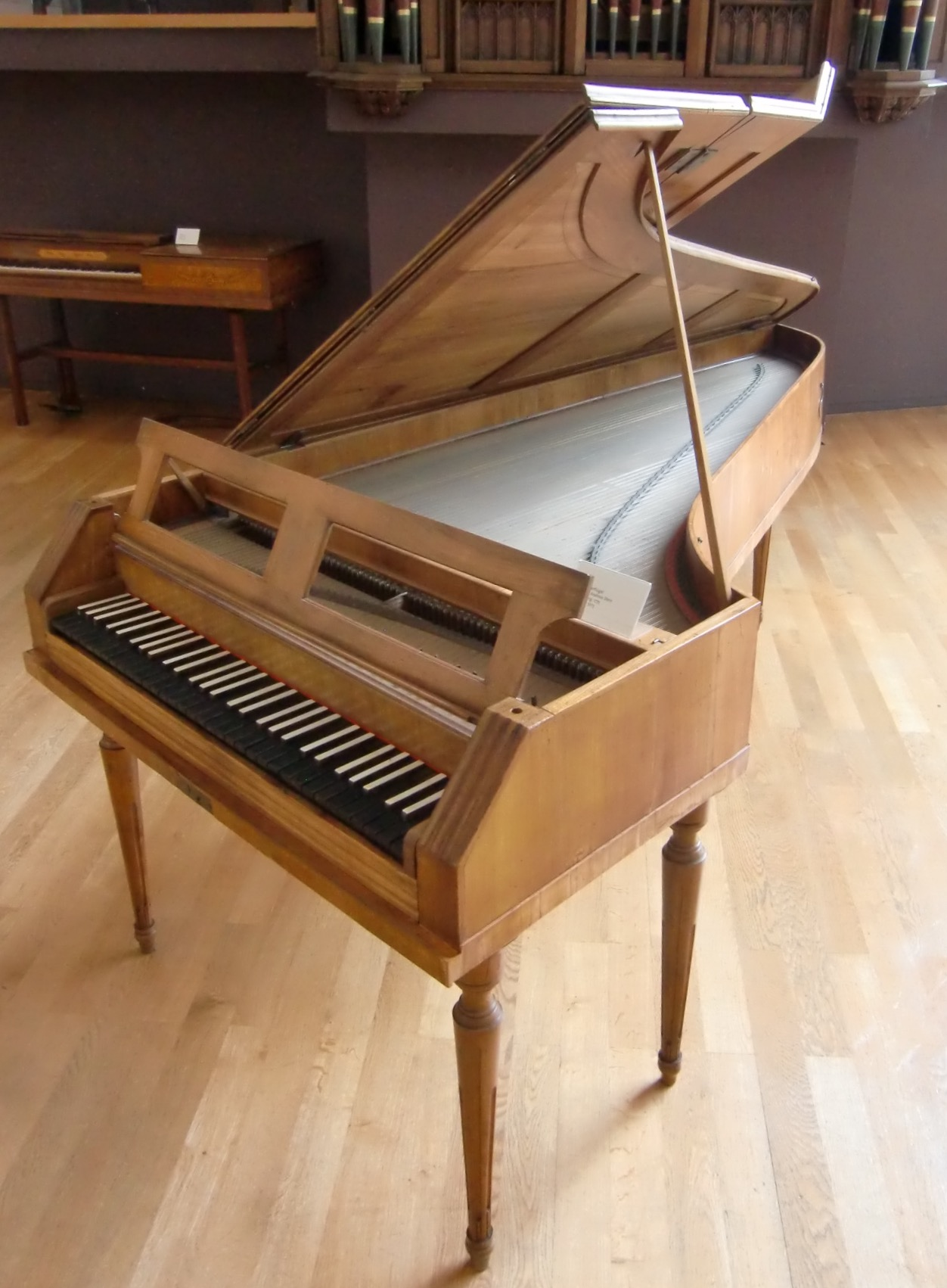
Fortepiano by Johann Andreas Stein (Augsburg, 1775) – Berlin, Musikinstrumentenmuseum

One of the most distinguished fortepiano builders in the era following Silbermann was one of his pupils, Johann Andreas Stein, who worked in Augsburg, Germany. Stein's fortepianos had (what we, or Cristofori, would call) "backwards" hammers, with the striking end closer to the player than the hinged end. This action came to be called the "Viennese" action, and was widely used in Vienna, even on pianos up to the mid 19th century. The Viennese action was simpler than the Cristofori action, and very sensitive to the player's touch. According to Edwin M. Ripin (see references below), the force needed to depress a key on a Viennese fortepiano was only about a fourth of what it is on a modern piano, and the descent of the key only about half as much. Thus playing the Viennese fortepiano involved nothing like the athleticism exercised by modern piano virtuosos, but did require exquisite sensitivity of touch.

Stein put the wood used in his instruments through a very severe weathering process, generating cracks in the wood, into which he would insert wedges. That gave his instruments a considerable longevity, on which Mozart commented, and several instruments survive today.

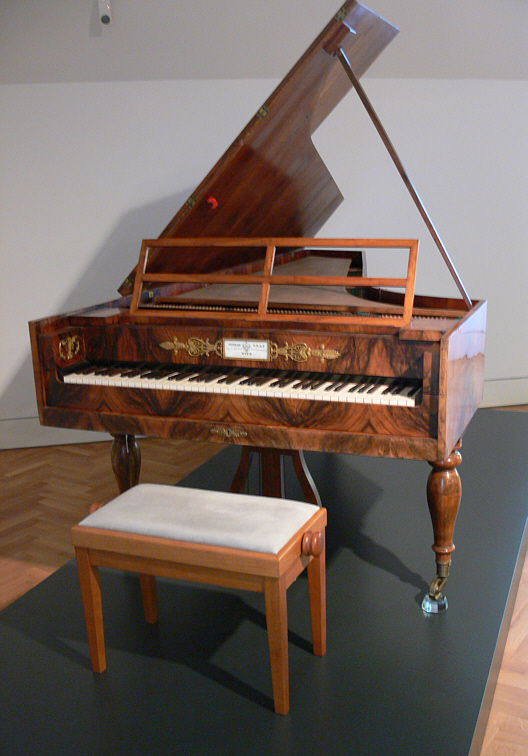
Fortepiano by Conrad Graf in the Reiss-Engelhorn-Museen, Mannheim

==== Other builders ====
Stein's fortepiano business was carried on in Vienna with distinction by his daughter Nannette Streicher, along with her husband Johann Andreas Streicher. The two were friends of Beethoven, and one of the composer's pianos was a Streicher. Later on, in the early 19th century, more robust instruments, with greater range, were built in Vienna, by (for example) the Streicher firm, which continued through two more generations of Streichers. Composer Johannes Brahms also preferred pianos by Streicher.

Another important Viennese builder was Anton Walter, a friend of Mozart, who built instruments with a somewhat more powerful sound than Stein's. Although Mozart very much admired the Stein fortepianos, as the 1777 letter mentioned above makes clear, his own piano was a Walter. Haydn also owned a Walter piano, and even Beethoven expressed a wish to buy one. The fortepianos of Stein and Walter are widely used today as models for the construction of new instruments, discussed below. Still another important builder in that period was Conrad Graf (1782–1851), who made Beethoven's last piano. Graf was one of the first Viennese makers to build pianos in quantity, as a large business enterprise. His instruments were played by Chopin, Mendelssohn and Schumann.

Prominent piano makers among the French during the era of the fortepiano included Erard, Pleyel (Chopin’s favorite maker) and Boisselot (Liszt’s favorite).

=== English builders ===
==== Zumpe/Shudi ====
Zumpe's, or Masons, action drawn from the instrument of 1766. 1) key, 2) jack, a wire with leather stud on top, known by the workmen as the "old man's head", 3) whalebone rear guide, projects from the end of the key, works in a groove to keep the key steady, 4) hammer, 5) whalebone jack, called the 'mopstick', 6) damper, 7) whalebone damper spring

The English fortepiano had a humble origin in the work of Johannes Zumpe, a maker who had immigrated from Germany and worked for a while in the workshop of the great harpsichord maker Burkat Shudi. Starting in the middle to late 1760s, Zumpe made inexpensive square pianos that had a very simple action, lacking an escapement, (sometimes known as the "old man's head"). Although hardly a technological advancement in the fortepiano, Zumpe's instruments proved very popular, being imitated outside England, and playing a major role in the displacement of the harpsichord by the fortepiano. The square pianos were also the medium of the first public performances on the instrument in the 1760s, notably by Johann Christian Bach.

==== Backers/Broadwood/Stodart ====
Americus Backers, with John Broadwood and Robert Stodart, two of Shudi's workmen, produced a more advanced action than Zumpe's. That English grand action, with an escapement and check, enabled a louder, more robust sound than the Viennese one, though it required deeper touch and was less sensitive. The early English grand pianos by those builders physically resembled Shudi harpsichords, being very imposing, with elegant, restrained veneer work on the exterior. Unlike contemporary Viennese instruments, English grand fortepianos had three strings per note, rather than two.

==== Broadwood ====
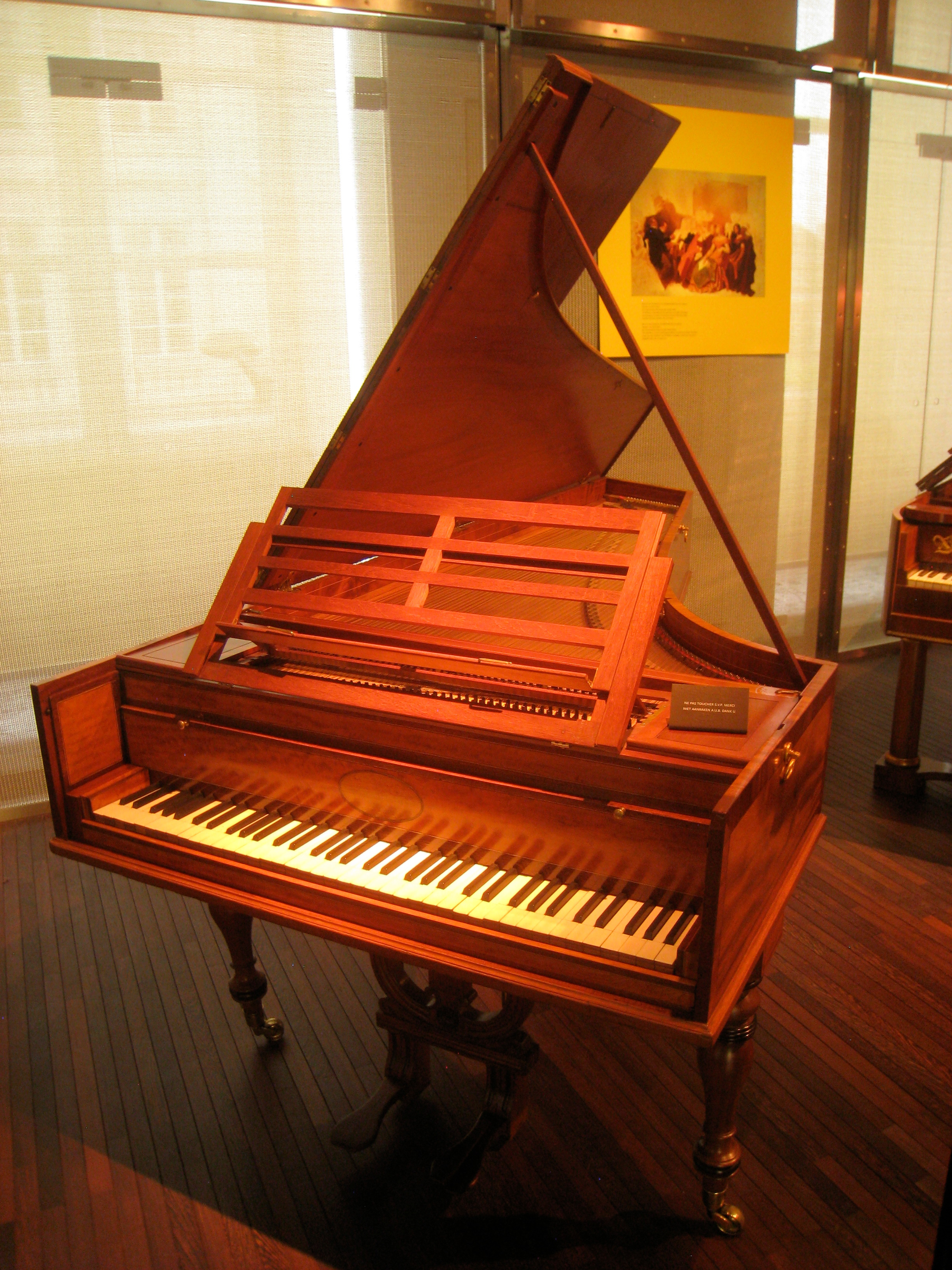
An 1810 Broadwood grand, kept in the Musical Instrument Museum in Brussels

John Broadwood married the master's daughter (Barbara Shudi, 1769) and ultimately took over and renamed the Shudi firm. The Broadwood company (which survives to this day) was an important innovator in the evolution of the fortepiano into the piano. Broadwood, in collaboration with Jan Ladislav Dussek, a noted piano virtuoso active in London in the 1790s, developed pianos that gradually increased the range to six octaves. Dussek was one of the first pianists to receive a 5 1/2 ft (1.7 m) piano and, in 1793, he wrote the first work for piano "with extra keys", a piano concert (C 97). The firm shipped a piano to Beethoven in Vienna, which the composer evidently treasured.

== Obsolescence and revival ==
From the late 18th century, the fortepiano underwent extensive technological development and evolved into the modern piano (for details, see Piano). The older type of instrument eventually ceased to be made. In the late 19th century, the early music pioneer Arnold Dolmetsch built three fortepianos. However, that attempted revival of the instrument was evidently several decades ahead of its time, and did not lead to its widespread adoption.

In the second half of the 20th century, a great upsurge of interest occurred in period instruments, including a revival of interest in the fortepiano. Old instruments were restored, and many new ones were built along the lines of the old. Fortepiano kits also became available. The ability of builders to recreate the fortepiano drew on the accumulating expertise of the builders who were making harpsichords of historical design; for instance fortepiano pioneer Philip Belt spent two years early in his career working as an apprentice for Frank Hubbard, a prominent builder of historical harpsichords. Other builders also took up fortepiano construction, including Margaret F. Hood, Rodney Regier, Chris Maene, and Paul McNulty.

The reintroduction of the fortepiano has permitted performance of 18th- and early 19th-century music on the instruments for which it was written, yielding new insights into this music (for detailed discussion, see Piano history and musical performance). More and more music schools offer courses of study in the fortepiano. There are several fortepiano competitions, including the MAfestival Brugge and the International Chopin Competition on Chopin era instruments, organized by the Warsaw Chopin Institute.

== Modern fortepiano specialists ==
A number of modern performers have achieved distinction in fortepiano performance, including Susan Alexander-Max, Paul Badura-Skoda, Pieter-Jan Belder, Kristian Bezuidenhout, Malcolm Bilson, Hendrik Bouman, Ronald Brautigam, Gary Cooper, Jörg Demus, Richard Egarr, Richard Fuller, Laurence Cummings, Vladimir Feltsman, Tuija Hakkila, Christoph Hammer, Robert Hill, Katia and Marielle Labèque, Geoffrey Lancaster, Robert Levin, Alexei Lubimov, Steven Lubin, Bart van Oort, Olga Pashchenko, Andras Schiff, David Schrader, Viviana Sofronitsky, Andreas Staier, Melvyn Tan, Natalia Valentin, and Jos van Immerseel.

== Opinions ==
People's opinions about the sound of the fortepiano vary widely, both from person to person and from instrument to instrument. Here are three representative opinions about fortepianos:

- "Although I am a lover of performances on authentic instruments the fortepiano was one of the least successful instruments and the most deserving of improvement. I am not always comfortable with the sound made by many fortepianos and however fine a performance may be I find it difficult at times to get past the often unpleasant sound." (Michael Cookson)
- "A frequent initial reaction to the sound of the fortepiano is that it is less beautiful than that of a fine modern concert grand piano. I believe that such a reaction will usually be changed if the player listens to good recordings. The clear sound and relatively short sustain of the fortepiano tends to favor the special elements of style in the music of Haydn and Mozart. The sound is different but not inferior." (Howland Auchincloss)
- "This reproduction of a 1730 Cristofori – the greatest of all makers and often the most underrated – by Denzil Wraight based on one made for Scarlatti's patron Queen Maria Barbara of Spain makes a gorgeous sound. Yes it can be metallic and subdued in climaxes but it has a marvellous delicacy and, especially in the expressive sonatas, a profoundly beautiful sound." (Gary Higginson)

== Etymology and usage ==
"Fortepiano" is Italian for "loud-soft", just as the formal name for the modern piano, "pianoforte", is "soft-loud". Both are abbreviations of Cristofori's original name for his invention: gravicembalo col piano e forte, "harpsichord with soft and loud".

The term fortepiano is somewhat specialist in its connotations, and does not preclude using the more general term piano to designate the same instrument. Thus, usages like "Cristofori invented the piano" or "Mozart's piano concertos" are currently common and would probably be considered acceptable by most musicians. Fortepiano is used in contexts where it is important to make the precise identity of the instrument clear, as in (for instance) "a fortepiano recital by Malcolm Bilson".

The use of "fortepiano" to refer specifically to early pianos appears to be recent. Even the authoritative Oxford English Dictionary does not record this usage, noting only that "fortepiano" is "an early name of the pianoforte". During the age of the fortepiano, "fortepiano" and "pianoforte" were used interchangeably, as the OED's attestations show. Jane Austen, who lived in the age of the fortepiano and herself played the instrument, used "pianoforte" (also: "piano-forte", "piano forte") for the many occurrences of the instrument in her writings.

== Sources ==
- Good, Edwin M. (1982) Giraffes, black dragons, and other pianos: a technological history from Cristofori to the modern concert grand, Stanford, Calif. : Stanford University Press.
- Kennedy, Michael (1996). "Piano". The Concise Oxford Dictionary of Music (Fourth ed.). Oxford and New York: Oxford University Press. ISBN 9780198608844.
- Marshall, Robert (2003) 18th Century Piano Music, Routledge.
- O'Donnell, Peter S. (1996) "Philip Belt - fortepiano maker," Iowa City Early Keyboard Newsletter, October issue. Posted on line at .
- Pollens, Stewart (1995) The Early Pianoforte. Cambridge: Cambridge University Press.
- Ripin, Edwin M. (1986) "Piano", 1986 Encyclopædia Britannica
- Ripin, Edwin M. (2001). "Fortepiano (i)". The New Grove Dictionary of Music and Musicians, ed. S. Sadie and J. Tyrrell. London: Macmillan. Also in Grove Music Online, ed. L. Macy (Accessed 19 June 2008), (subscription access)
- Ripin, Edwin M., Stewart Pollens, Philip R. Belt, Maribel Meisel, Alfons Huber, Michael Cole, Gert Hecher, Beryl Kenyon De Pascual, Cynthia Adams Hoover, Cyril Ehrlich, And Edwin M. Good (2001). "Pianoforte I: History of the Instrument". The New Grove Dictionary of Music and Musicians, ed. S. Sadie and J. Tyrrell. London: Macmillan. Also in Grove Music Online, ed. L. Macy (Accessed 19 June 2008), (subscription access)
