= Conrad Graf =

Austrian-German piano maker

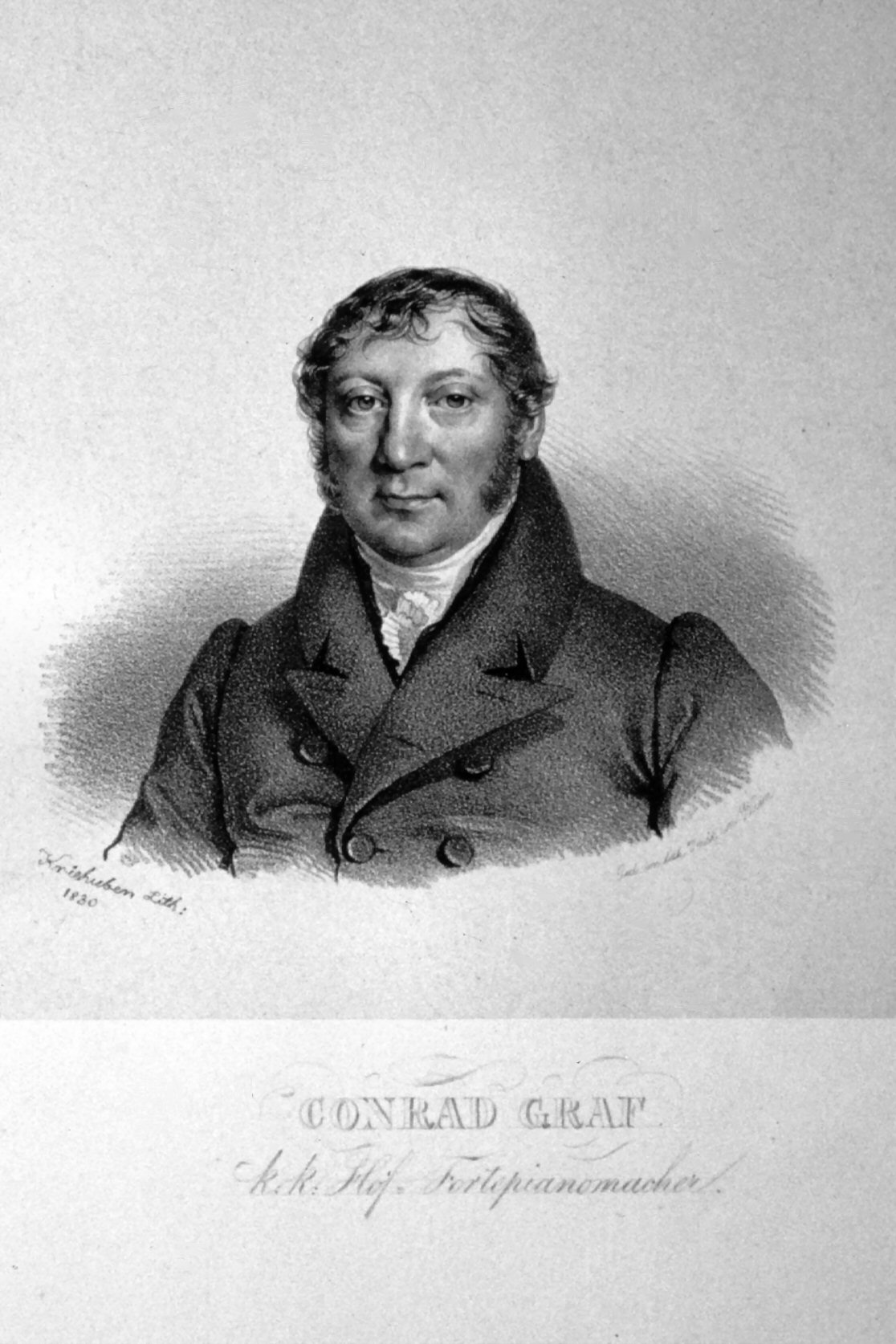
Conrad Graf (lithograph by Josef Kriehuber, 1830)

Conrad Graf (17 November 1782 in Riedlingen, Further Austria – 18 March 1851 in Vienna) was an Austrian-German fortepiano maker. His pianos were used by Beethoven, Schubert, Chopin, Liszt, Mendelssohn, and Robert and Clara Schumann, among others.

== Life and career ==
Graf began his career as a cabinet maker, studying the craft in his native Riedlingen in south Germany, in what was then Further Austria. He reached the status of journeyman in 1796 and migrated to Vienna in either 1798 or 1799. In 1800 he served briefly in an all-volunteer military unit, the Jäger Freikorps, then became apprenticed to a piano maker named Jakob Schelkle, who worked in Währing, then a suburb of Vienna. When Schelkle died in 1804, Graf married his widow Katherina and took over the shop.

The Graf family had two children listed in census records: Karalina Schelklin (born 1802), from Katherina's previous marriage, and Juliana Graf (born 1806). Katherina died in 1814, and Graf did not remarry.

It is not known how Graf developed his style or methods for building pianos. None of the pianos of his teacher Schelkle survive, and the surviving early Graf instruments are not much different from his fully mature ones. As Wythe says, "Graf's style appears to have emerged fully developed out of an apprenticeship with an obscure provincial maker."

The early 19th century was a period of ferment in piano building; Wythe describes the work of contemporary builders as "a volatile blend of traditional craftsmanship and new technology, carried out in an atmosphere of intense competition." Graf was successful in this milieu. By 1809, he was employing ten workers. In 1811, he relocated from the original suburban location to new quarters in the (more expensive) central city. In 1824 he was appointed as Royal Piano and Keyboard Maker to the Imperial court in Vienna.

By 1826, the increasing demand for his pianos had led Graf to adopt methods of mass production, an area in which he was a pioneer. (Earlier, the building of pianos took place in small workshops.) He purchased the "Mondscheinhaus", (Note: German: "moonlight house") a formerly fashionable dance hall at 102 auf der Wieden, and converted it into a piano factory, removing the chandeliers and other accoutrements. A report from 1835 indicates that the factory had 40 employees, who were "organized in eight divisions, each specializing in a particular job" (Wythe). Many of the workers lived in the same building, which included ten apartments. Between 1827 and 1831 Graf built two additions to his factory, adding a total of over 1000 square meters.

Graf's firm eventually produced over 3000 instruments during his lifetime. As the Grove Dictionary notes, the instruments "show a remarkable degree of consistency and may be categorized as a series of models", presumably as a consequence of Graf's mass production methods. The lower cost of factory-produced instruments led in the 19th century to widespread ownership of pianos by the middle class.

In 1835, Graf won a gold medal for his pianos in 1835 at the first Viennese industrial products exhibition. His pianos were often owned and played by celebrated musicians (see below).

In 1840 Graf retired and sold the firm to Carl Stein, who was the grandson of the famous piano builder Johann Andreas Stein.

Graf's business was successful enough for him to become an art collector, and he amassed an extensive collection. From Josef Danhauser he commissioned in 1840 the famous painting Franz Liszt Fantasizing at the Piano (shown below), which shows Franz Liszt playing to an imagined gathering of his friends. (Note: For discussion of the painting's characters and iconography, see Leppert 2002, pp. 203–204.) The instrument portrayed is a Graf.

During his retirement Graf served as a volunteer for a businessman's association, the Niederösterreichische Gewerb-Verein ("Lower Austrian Industrial Association"), which he had helped to found in 1839. He died 18 March 1851 at the age of 69. His will left sizeable bequests to charitable causes.

== Graf's pianos ==
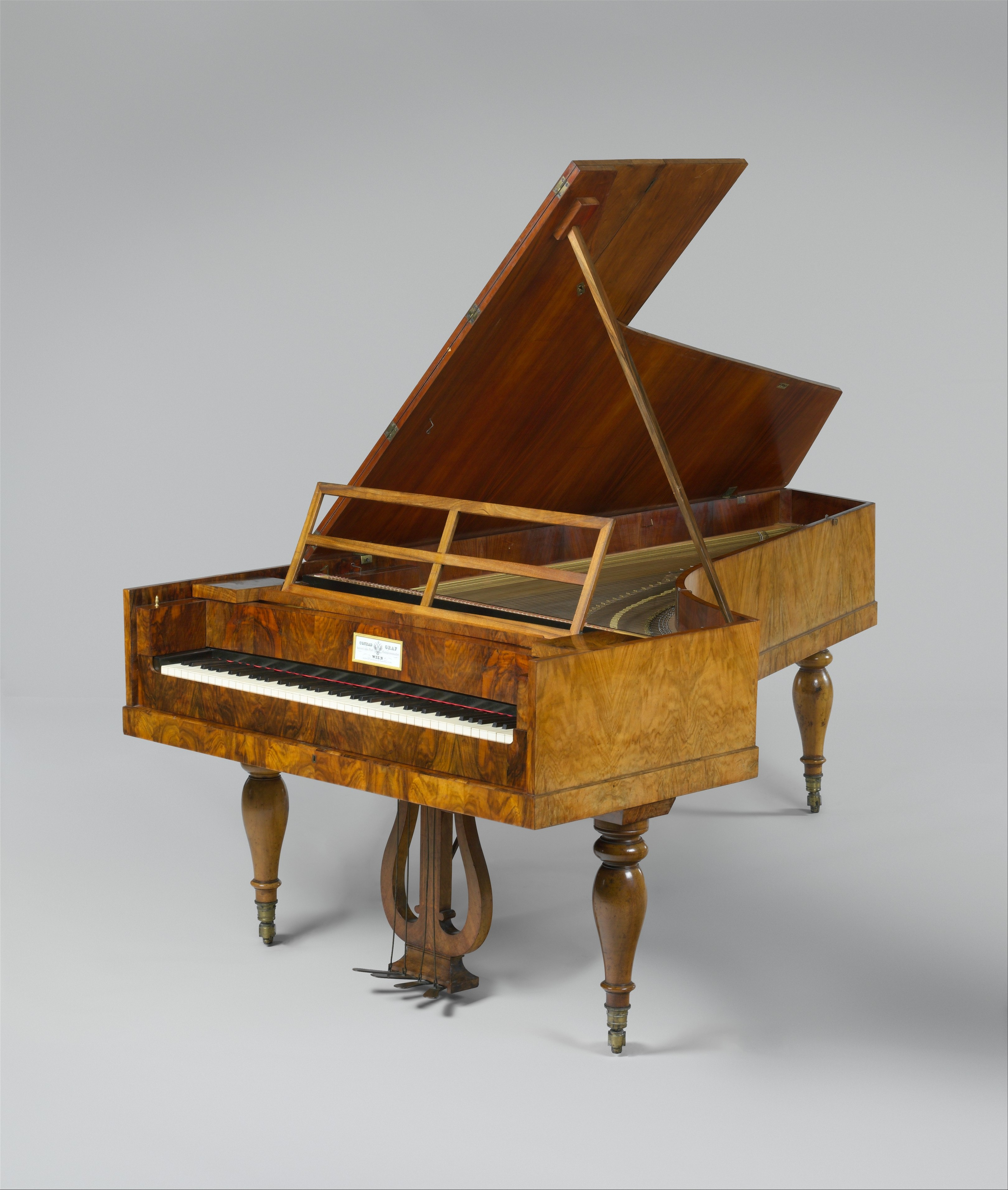
Graf piano with four pedals

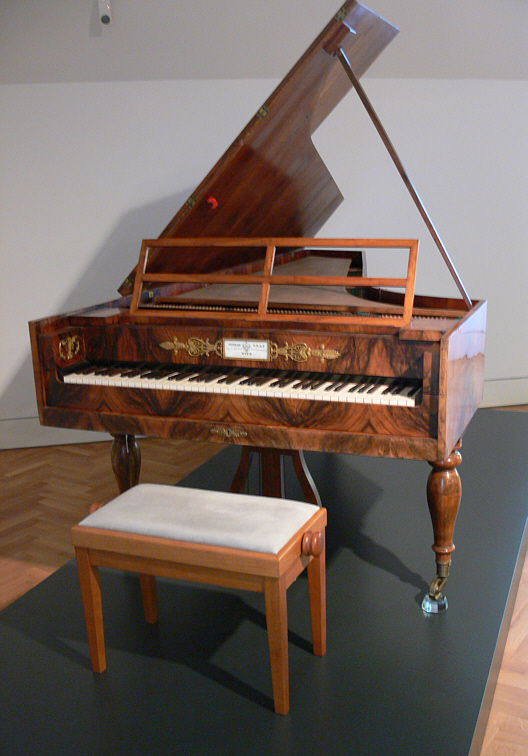
Piano by Conrad Graf

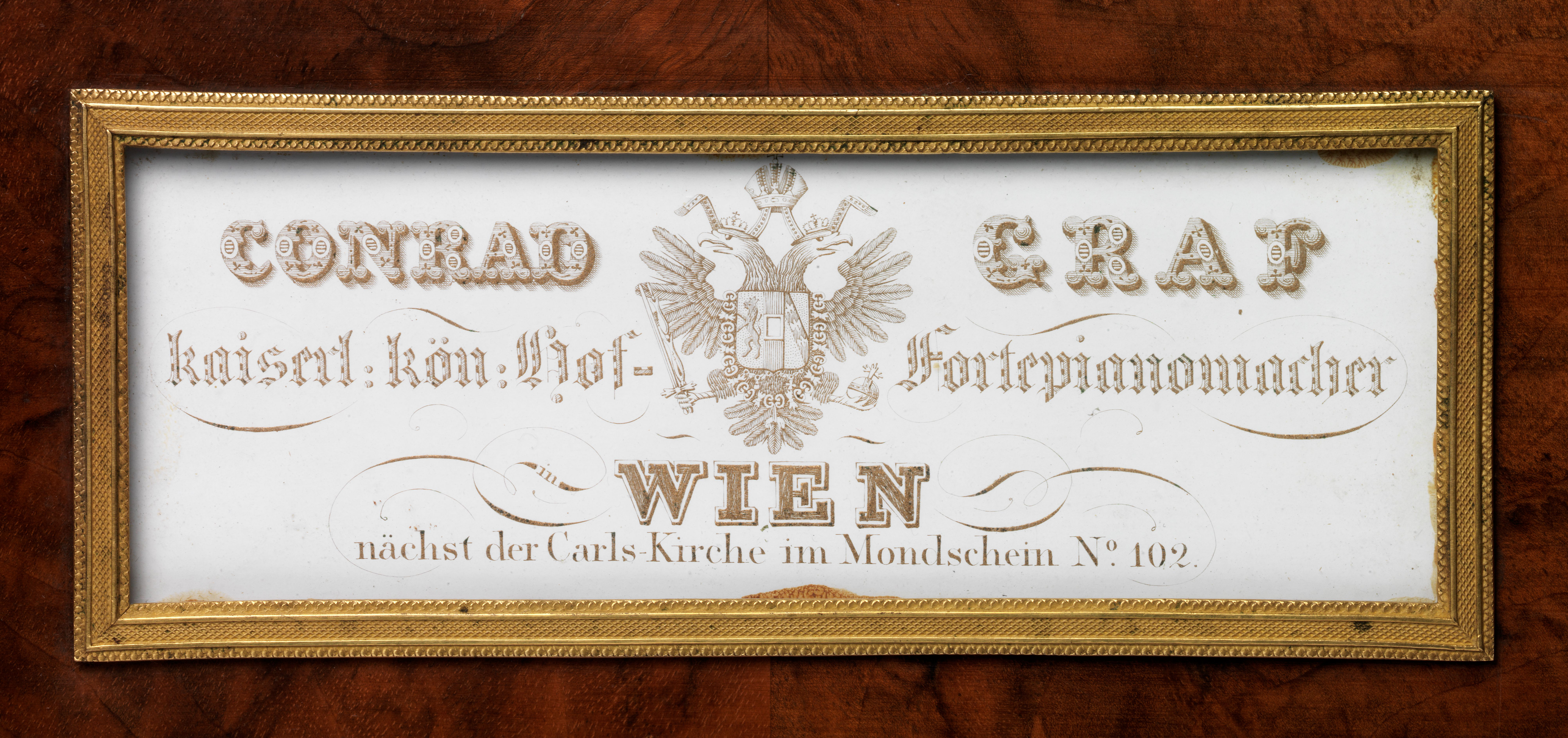
Detail on pianoforte from c. 1825 in the collection of the National Museum of Denmark

As was typical with the pianos of his day, Graf's instruments use rather little metal reinforcement. The only metal structural part was the gap spacer, which reinforced the structure at the gap where the strings cross over the action; otherwise, their construction was entirely of wood. The stringing was straight (that is, all strings parallel, instead of the bass strings crossing over the treble as in modern pianos). The range as C′–f′′′′ or g′′′′. There were from three to five pedals, which other than the standard damper pedal could also include the soft pedal, bassoon stop, piano and pianissimo moderators, and janissary stop).

Although Graf pianos had no metal frame, they were very strong. According to Wythe, "The frame members, constructed of five-ply laminated oak and spruce, interlock like bricks at each joint and at the belly rail, creating an exceptionally stable frame." The case was laminated i.e., built in layers, as it usually is in modern grands. The sturdy construction prevented warping, which was a common problem of pianos in Graf's day, when both number and tension of strings was increasing.

Viennese pianos, including Graf's, are known for effective damping of sound after the key is released. Graf achieved this result by a variety of means. The dampers were graded in size (larger in the bass), and used different materials for different ranges (wool in the treble, leather in the bass). The weight of the dampers was also controlled: dampers for lower notes were made of a heavier wood (beech), vs. lime in the treble. The lowest 13–17 dampers were weighted with lead.

A curious aspect of some of Graf's pianos was a second soundboard. This had no bridges, but simply floated above the strings (not attached to them). According to Wythe its purpose was to make the sound "mellower and more blended." The instrument shown in this article has such a soundboard.

The exteriors of Graf's pianos were largely undecorated, emphasizing instead the beauty of bookmatched veneers in walnut and mahogany. (The mirror-image motif created by bookmatching is visible in the illustration above.) The natural keys were normally of ivory and the sharps of ebony.

Thanks to their sturdy construction, Graf pianos have lasted for a long time. Over 60 of them have survived to the present day and can be found in many of the musical instrument museums of Europe and the United States. (Note: For a partial inventory with descriptions of individual instruments, see Kottick & Lucktenberg 1997, index entry "Conrad Graf".)

With a single exception, the surviving Graf pianos are grands. The exception is a notable one, an 1829 pyramid piano (a kind of upright) built on commission and extravagantly decorated with caryatids, an ornamental urn, and other sculptures. It is kept in the Gemeentemuseum in the Hague.

=== Sound ===
Owing to their heavier construction, Graf's pianos have a rather different sound from the pianos that prevailed through Mozart's, Haydn's, and much of Beethoven and Schubert's musical careers; for example those built by Johann Andreas Stein or Anton Walter. Intuitively, the sound is "heavier", less tinkling, and shifted in the direction of the modern piano. Builder/scholar Paul Poletti, who is experienced in restoring and copying Grafs, offers these comments on the Graf sound:

"Graf's instruments represent an aesthetic which is more proto-Romantic than late-classical Viennese. Everything about their design is tailored to provide a long singing tone, which unfortunately can only be had at the expense of clarity and transparency. If you really love the music of Schumann and early Brahms, a Graf is just the thing for you, but if you are more interested in Beethoven and Schubert, I'd recommend a late Classical instrument ... Graf's instruments are significantly heavier than their contemporaries because of the solid oak framework. Despite their reputation, they are actually not any louder than instruments by other makers – perhaps even less so."

For downloadable sound files illustrating the tone of a Graf, see External Links below.

=== Graf as inventor ===
Although Graf's pianos are generally considered conservative in their design, there is evidence that Graf explored various ways to improve them. His technical innovations included the strengthened interior bracing mentioned above, a new method of leathering hammers. At various stages (about 1810–1820, and also 1826; see below) he explored the possibility of adding a fourth string per note. Graf also built a mechanical saw for cutting veneer, capable of cutting strips up to 57 cm. wide, and created a device intended to help deaf persons (one in particular; see below) hear the sound of the piano.

== Graf pianos played by celebrated musicians ==
In 1826 (Note: Sources differ on this date. Good 1982, p. 91 gives 1824. Wythe 1984, p. 456, who examined a great number of surviving Graf pianos, gives the following: "Most references place it around 1825 on the basis of unidentified 'contemporary sources', and Gerhard von Breuning reports seeing it in the summer of 1826. The evidence of labels and addresses ... supports a date no earlier than 31 January 1826 and possibly as late as 1827.") Graf lent to Ludwig van Beethoven a 6½-octave piano triple-strung to C♯, and quadruple-strung from D to the top (F4) – probably on the assumption that this stringing would make the piano more audible for the composer, who was quite deaf by this time. Graf's sound-channeling device, mentioned above, was also part of this effort.

Following Beethoven's death in 1827, Graf took the piano back and sold it to the Wimmer family of Vienna. The instrument survives today and is on display at the Beethoven-Haus in Bonn. The importance of the Graf to Beethoven's career is probably minor. According to Good, "the only work he wrote for piano after getting it was the four-hand transcription of the Grosse Fugue ... and the indications are that he was playing very little even for himself in the last three years of his life."

In 1829, the 19-year-old Frédéric Chopin came to Vienna from Poland to give concert performances on the piano. Both Graf and his rival Matthäus Andreas Stein offered Chopin an instrument to use. Chopin, who was familiar with foreign pianos, unhesitatingly selected the Graf, and his Vienna concerts were a success. According to Goldberg, Chopin continued to "cherish" Graf instruments during his subsequent career in Paris.

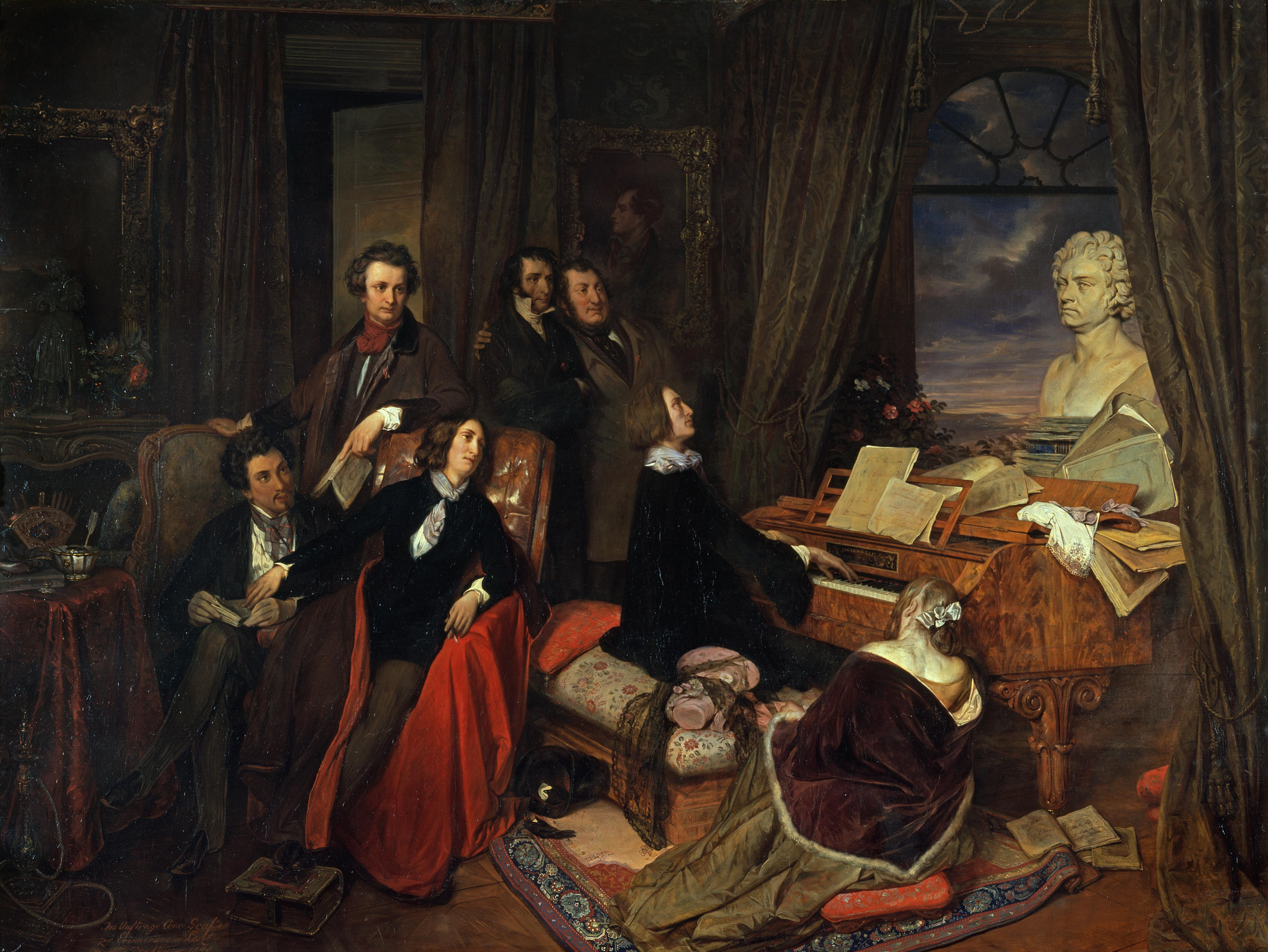
Liszt at the Piano shows Franz Liszt playing a Graf piano at an imagined gathering of his friends (1840, commissioned by Graf from Josef Danhauser)

The famous virtuoso Franz Liszt, who played Graf pianos, must have been something of a thorn in Herr Graf's side, as the Graf piano was not always capable of standing up to the violence that Liszt inflicted on it during his more impassioned moments of playing. Friedrich Wieck wrote in his diary during Liszt's 1838 visit to Vienna, "We heard Liszt today at Conrad Graf's who was sweating as his piano did not survive the great duel—Liszt remained the victor." Wieck described another concert on the same visit in which Liszt "destroyed" two Grafs, as well as an Erard piano lent to him by Sigismond Thalberg.

Felix Mendelssohn also admired instruments from Graf. He acquired one in 1832 which he used in the family house and recitals in Berlin, and later another for use in Dusseldorf.

In 1840, Graf gave one of his firm's grand pianos as a gift to the young piano virtuoso Clara Wieck (Friedrich's daughter), on the occasion of her marriage to Robert Schumann. When Schumann died in 1856, Clara gave the instrument to her friend Johannes Brahms, who used it for his work until 1873. He then donated it to the Gesellschaft der Musikfreunde; today it is on display in the Kunsthistorisches Museum in Vienna.

During the 1880s, the young Gustav Mahler owned and played a very old piano, a Graf from about 1836. The instrument is currently housed in the Cobbe Collection near Guildford in England. The collection's web site suggests that Mahler simply could not afford a better piano at the time. Other musicians who owned or played Graf pianos included Friedrich Kalkbrenner and Camille Pleyel. In September 2018 a Graf 1819 replica was used in the first International Chopin Competition on Period Instruments (run by Fryderyk Chopin Institute).

== Assessment ==
Of Graf's instruments, Wythe says they "represent the culmination of Viennese classical piano building in the style of J. A. Stein and Anton Walter: they are uncorrupted by modern 'advances' such as the steel frame and the repeat action, and show none of the unwieldiness that eventually led to the decline of the Viennese piano." Kottick and Lucktenberg describe Graf thus: "although a conservative builder, Graf was well thought of, and some of the best nineteenth-century German pianists preferred his instruments." The report of the exhibition where Graf's pianos won a gold medal said:

The distinguished characteristics of his pianos have gained them the attention of the entire musical world; indeed, there is a strong market for his instruments not only domestically but in all parts of the civilized world ... [they] must be included among the most successful achievements in the art of piano building.

The surviving Graf instruments are about two centuries old; the musicologist Robert Winter has voiced strong criticism of performers who choose to use historical instruments, including Graf pianos, that may sound very poorly after such a great passage of time. However, a number of modern builders have created new copies of Graf pianos, and these non-dilapidated instruments have been adopted by a variety of modern performers for both concerts and recordings.

=== Recordings made with originals fortepianos of Conrad Graf ===
- Esther Hoppe, Florian Birsak. Wolfgang Amadeus Mozart. Mozarts Costa-Violine. Label: belvedere. Played on Conrad Graf fortepiano (1839).
- Natalia Rehling. Frédéric Chopin. Sonata No. 2, Preludes op. 28. Label: paladino music. Played on Conrad Graf fortepiano (after 1828).
- Hardy Rittner. Frédéric Chopin. Complete Etudes. Label: MDG. Played on Conrad Graf fortepiano (c. 1835).
- The Atlantis Trio (Penelope Crawford, Jaap Schröder, Enid Sutherland) Felix and Fanny Mendelssohn. Klaviertrios. Label: Musica Omnia. Played on a Graf fortepiano.
- Paul Badura-Skoda. Franz Schubert. Fantaisie Pour le Piano-forte. Label: Astree. Played on a Conrad Graf 1824 fortepiano.
- Erich Höbarth, Alexander Rudin, Aapo Häkkinen. Franz Schubert. Piano Trio No. 2, Arpeggione Sonata. Label: Naxos. Played on Conrad Graf fortepiano (1827).
- Daniel Paul Horn. Franz Schubert, Felix Mendelssohn. Wanderings: Fanatasies of Schubert & Mendelssohn. Label: Titanic. Played on Conrad Graf fortepiano (c. 1829).
- Malcolm Bilson. Franz Schubert. Piano Sonatas D.850, D.568. Label: Hungaraton Classics. Played on Conrad Graf ca.1835 fortepiano.
- Jörg Demus. Robert Schumann. Musik auf historischen Instrumenten aus dem Erbdrostenhof zu Münster. Label: FSM. Played on Conrad Graf fortepiano (c. 1835).
- Jörg Demus. Robert Schumann. Fantasiestücke Op. 12, Humoresque Op. 20. Label: MDG. Played on Conrad Graf fortepiano Op. 1810 (c. 1835).
- Paul Schweinester, Andreas Mattersberger, Annette Seiler, Johannes Hinterholzer. Josef Netzer. Lieder & Duett Die Loreley. Label: Musikmuseum. Played on Conrad Graf fortepiano (1835).
- Maria Erlacher, Andreas Lebeda, Nikolaus Walch, Annette Seiler. Josef Netzer. Lieder. Label: Musikmuseum. Played on Conrad Graf fortepiano (1835).
- Annette Seiler. Felix Mendelssohn. Lieder ohne Worte, Rondo capriccioso & Variations sérieuses. Label: Musikmuseum. Played on Conrad Graf fortepiano (1835).
- Annette Seiler. Robert Schumann. Psychogramme. Label: Musikmuseum. Played on Conrad Graf fortepiano (c. 1835).
- Attilio Cremonesi, Anna Fontana. Johann Nepomuk Hummel, Ferdinand Ries, Johann Baptist Cramer, Jan Kalivoda. A quattro mani. Label: Musikmuseum. Played on Conrad Graf fortepiano Op. 2003 (c. 1835).
- Tobias Koch. Franz Schubert. Zukunftsmusik: Die letzten drei Klaviersonaten. Label: Musikmuseum. Played on Conrad Graf fortepiano (c. 1835).
- Tobias Koch. Norbert Burgmüller, Felix Mendelssohn, Friedrich Burgmüller. Complete Works for Pianoforte. Label: Genuin. Played on fortepianos by Conrad Graf Op. 1181 (c. 1826) and Ignace Pleyel Op. 8777 (c. 1835).
- Tobias Koch, Riko Fukuda. Frédéric Chopin, Ignaz Moscheles, Felix Mendelssohn, Ferdinand Hiller, Franz Liszt. Grand Duo. Label: ARS Produktion. Played on Conrad Graf fortepianos (1830) and Op. 2258 (1835).
- Tobias Koch. Ludwig van Beethoven. Complete Piano Pieces. Label: Avi-Music. Played on fortepianos by Michael Rosenberger (1810), Conrad Graf (1827), Nannette Streicher & Sohn (1825), orphica (ca. 1800) and tangent piano by Späth und Schmahl (1790) and Nannette Streicher fortepiano (1816).
- Pierre-André Taillard, Edoardo Torbianelli. Carl Maria von Weber, Ferdinand Ries. Grand Duo Concertant. Label: Harmonia Mundi. Played on Conrad Graf fortepianos Op. 1040 (1822-1823) and Op. 367 (1820).
- Thomas Oliemans, Paolo Giacometti. Robert Schumann. Lieder: Dr. Jekyll & Mr. Hyde. Label: Channel Classics. Played on fortepianos by Conrad Graf (c. 1830) and Johann Baptist Streicher (1847).
- Julian Perkins, Emma Abbate. Carl Maria von Weber. Complete Keyboard Duets. Label: Deux-Elles. Played on Conrad Graf fortepiano (1826).
- Stephen Preston, Jennifer Ward Clarke, Richard Burnett. Carl Maria von Weber. Flute Trio and Sonatas. Label: Amon-Ra. Played on Conrad Graf fortepiano (1826).
- Ralph Holmes, Richard Burnett. Johann Nepomuk Hummel. Works for Violin and Piano. Label: Amon-Ra. Played on Conrad Graf fortepiano (1826).
- Richard Burnett. Johann Nepomuk Hummel, Frédéric Chopin, Franz Schubert, Robert Schumann, Carl Czerny. FThe Romantic Fortepiano. Label: SKC. Played on Conrad Graf fortepiano Op. 988 (1841).
- Eleonora Contucci, Costantino Mastroprimiano. Hugo Staehle. Mädchenliebe: Lieder. Label: Brilliant Classics. Played on Conrad Graf fortepiano Op. 1092 (1826).
- Eleonora Contucci, Costantino Mastroprimiano. Norbert Burgmüller. Lieder, Piano Sonata Op. 8. Label: Brilliant Classics. Played on Conrad Graf fortepiano Op. 1092 (1826).
- Costantino Mastroprimiano. Frédéric Chopin. Early Works. Label: Brilliant Classics. Played on Conrad Graf fortepiano Op. 1092 (1826).
- Christoph Huntgeburth, Rolf Junghanns. Franz Schubert, Franz Xaver Wolfgang Mozart, Johann Nepomuk Hummel. Romantic Flute Music. Label: FSM. Played on Conrad Graf fortepiano (1824).
- Michael Schopper, Jos van Immerseel. Franz Schubert. Schwanengesang. Label: Globe. Played on Conrad Graf fortepiano (1826).
- Rufus Müller, Christoph Hammer. Franz Lachner. Sängerfahrt, Op.33, und Andere Lieder nach Gedichten von Heine. Label: Oehms. Played on Conrad Graf fortepiano Op. 1207 (c. 1827).

=== Recordings made with replicas fortepianos of Conrad Graf ===
- Pierre Goy. Frédéric Chopin. Chopin à vienne. Label: Lyrinx Played on a copy by Christopher Clarke of a Graf fortepiano (1826).
- Tatiana Loguinova. Mikhail Glinka. Treasures for the Pianoforte. Label: Phaedra. Played on a copy by Chris Maene of a Graf fortepiano (1825).
- The Helicon Ensemble. Robert Schumann. A Schumann Salon Concert. Label: Helicon. Played on a copy by R. J. Regier (1987) of a Graf fortepiano (c. 1824).
- Franz Vitzthum, Katharina Olivia Brand. Franz Schubert, Carl Friedrich Zelter, Charlotte Bender, Johann Friedrich von Dalberg, Anselm Hüttenbrenner, Johann Vesque von Püttlingen, Josephine Caroline Lang, Ernst Friedrich Kauffmann, Felix Mendelssohn. Nachthimmel: Lieder von Schubert, Zelter, Dalberg. Label: Christophorus. Played on a copy by Christoph Kern (2019) of a Graf fortepiano (1826).
- Costantino Mastroprimiano. Franz Schubert. Sonatas D. 157, D. 664, D. 850. Label: Dynamic. Played on a copy by Andrea Restelli (2012) of a Graf fortepiano Op. 593.
- Kristian Bezuidenhout. Ludwig van Beethoven. Piano Concertos Nos. 2&5. Label: Harmonia Mundi. Played on a replica of a Graf 1824 made by R. Regier.
- Michael Tsalka. Ferdinand Ries. Romantic Variations, Fantasies and a Rondo. Label: Naxos. Fortepianos by Thomas and Barbara Wolf after Johann Schanz (c. 1800, replica: 1997) and Nannette Streicher (c. 1815, replica: 1994) and by R. J. Reiger (Freeport, 1993) after Conard Graf (c. 1824).
- Ronald Brautigam. Ludwig van Beethoven. Complete Works for Solo Piano. Label: BIS. Played on a copy of a Graf, Walter and Stein fortepianos made by Paul McNulty.
- Ronald Brautigam. Carl Maria von Weber. Complete Works for Piano & Orchestra. Label: BIS. Played on a copy by Paul McNulty (2007) of a Graf fortepiano (c. 1819) .
- Markus Schäfer, Zvi Meniker. Franz Schubert. The Small Song Cycles. Label: Passacaille. Played on a copy by Paul McNulty (2012) of a Graf fortepiano (c. 1819) .
- Petra Matejová. Jan Václav Voříšek. Rhapsodies, Fantasia. Label: Český rozhlas. Played on a copy by Paul McNulty (2008) of a Graf fortepiano (1819) .
- Viviana Sofronitsky. Franz Schubert. Wanderer Fantasy. Impromptus opp.90 & 142. Label: Avi Music. Played on a copy of a Graf instrument made by Paul McNulty.

== Notes and references ==
Notes

=== Sources ===
- Fine, Larry (2004). The Piano Book (4th ed.). Brookside Press.
- Gibbs, Christopher Howard (2006). "'Just two words. Enormous success': Liszt's 1838 Vienna concerts". In Christopher H. Gibbs; Dana Gooley (eds.). Liszt and His World. Princeton University Press. ISBN 9781400828616.
- Goldberg, Halina (2008). Music in Chopin's Warsaw. Oxford University Press. ISBN 978-0-19-513073-7.
- Good, Edwin Marshall (1982). Giraffes, Black Dragons, and Other Pianos: A Technological History from Cristofori to the Modern Concert Grand. Stanford University Press. ISBN 0-8047-1120-8.
- Kottick, Edward L.; Lucktenberg, George (1997). Early Keyboard Instruments in European Museums. Bloomington: Indiana University Press.
- Leppert, Richard (2002). "Cultural contradiction, idolatry, and the piano virtuoso: Franz Liszt". In James Parakilas; E. Douglas Bomberger (eds.). Piano Roles: A New History of the Piano. New Haven: Yale University Press.
- Schott, Howard (1977). "Liszt and the keyboard". Music & Letters. 118: 911.
- Winter, Robert (1987). "The emperor's new clothes: Nineteenth-century instruments revisited". 19th-Century Music. 7 (3): 251–265. doi:10.2307/746380. JSTOR 746380.
- Wythe, Deborah (1984). "The pianos of Conrad Graf". Early Music. 12 (4): 447–460. doi:10.1093/earlyj/12.4.447.
- Wythe, Deborah (2001). "Graf, Conrad". Grove Music Online. doi:10.1093/gmo/9781561592630.article.11581.(subscription required)
