= Paul McNulty (piano maker) =

American piano maker (born 1953)

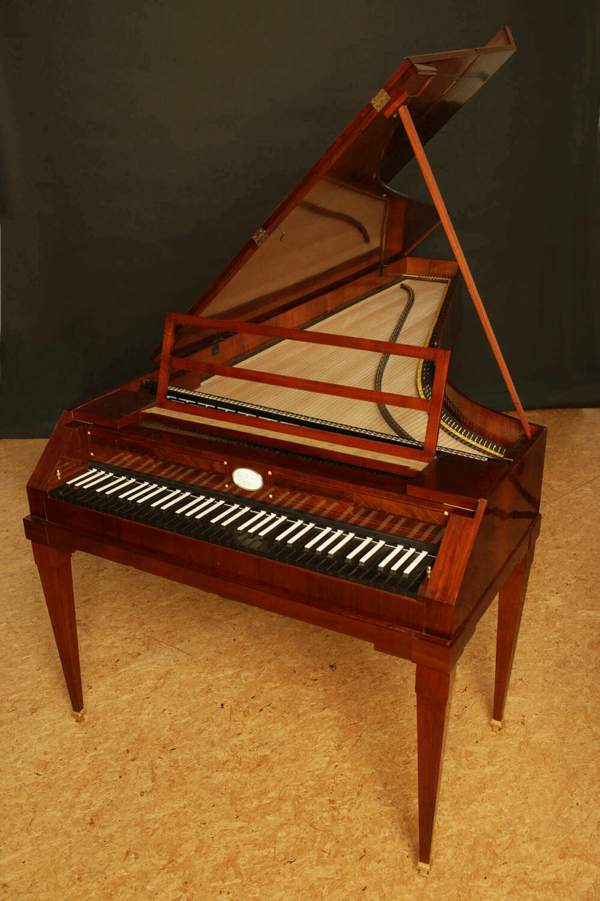
- Fortepiano by Paul McNulty, based on a model by Walter & Sohn, 1805
- Born: 1953 (age 72–73); Houston, Texas
- Citizenship: United States, Czech Republic
- Education: North Bennet Street School
- Occupation: Piano maker
- Spouse: Viviana Sofronitsky
- Website: www.fortepiano.eu

Paul McNulty (born 1953) is a builder of historical pianos, described by the New Grove as "famous for the high standard of [his] instruments." Within the community of builders, McNulty is noted for his efforts to extend the production of historically informed instruments later into history: while he has built many fortepianos in 18th-century style, he has also progressively sought to span the gap between the fortepiano (the cradle of modern historical-piano construction) and the fully modern piano that emerged around the last third of the 19th century. The expanding diversity of McNulty's productions has thus helped "provide an opportunity to extend keyboard performing practice to include the piano repertory of the 19th century" (New Grove).

== Life ==
He was born in 1953 in Houston, Texas. In 1976 he attended the Peabody Conservatory, studying classical guitar, then became interested in historical instruments, studying lute performance, etc. In 1978 he entered the New England School of Stringed Keyboard Instrument Technology, where he studied under Bill Garlick. At his final examination McNulty gained the highest possible qualification: "tuning examiner". He attended a seminar at the Steinway factory in New York and was recruited to work there as a technician, but chose instead to embark on a career as a fortepiano builder, and served his apprenticeship for two years under Robert Smith in Somerville, Massachusetts.

In 1986 John Gibbons invited McNulty to accompany his European tour with Frans Brüggen's Orchestra of the Eighteenth Century. Gibbons performed Mozart's concertos K.491 and K.466. In the same year McNulty moved to Amsterdam. The search for the best materials led McNulty to move to the Czech Republic. It was written that Viennese piano makers preferred to get their soundboards from the Schwarzenberg Forest (now Šumava) in southern Bohemia. Since 1995 McNulty has been living and working in Divišov, a small Czech town. In 2004 he married Russian-Canadian fortepianist Viviana Sofronitsky.

McNulty's fortepiano was purchased by Norwegian Academy of Music in Oslo. It is worth mentioning that the Austrian pianist Paul Badura-Skoda also placed an order, as did Trevor Pinnock, ordering a fortepiano for a concert at Carnegie Hall. In September 2018 McNulty fortepianos Graf copy 1819, Pleyel 1830 and Buchholtz 1826 were used in the first International Chopin Competition on Period Instruments.

In 2021, commissioned by Chopin Institute in Warsaw, McNulty led the restoration process of the last of Chopin's own pianos (Pleyel 1848 grand piano of the serial number 14810). The whole process took place on 3-12 December in Fryderyk Chopin Museum in Warsaw and was publicly exposed.

The II International Chopin Competition on Period Instruments also couldn't do without McNulty's (forte)pianos. Added to all of the instruments used in the 1st edition, there were also another copy of Pleyel 1830, copies of Graf 1836 and Boisselot 1846, and also an instrument by Teller (Karlovy Vary) c. 1830 restored by McNulty.

Today, together with his successor Sergei Kramer, he continues building concert fortepianos, restoring originals including Chopin’s last piano, and touring internationally as a concert and recording technician.

== McNulty's fortepianos ==
At present, McNulty builds fortepianos suitable for performances of piano works from Carl Philipp Emanuel Bach, Mozart and Beethoven to Chopin, Liszt and Brahms.

In 2009, McNulty produced the first modern copy of a French piano, a Pleyel, which was Chopin's favorite brand. In 2011, at request of Klassik Stiftung Weimar he reproduced one of Liszt's personal pianos, the Boisselot op. 2800. This instrument was made in 1846 for Liszt's 1847 Russian tour. In 2015 McNulty extended his list of first modern copies with Streicher piano, Johannes Brahms' favourite piano model. In 2020 Paul McNulty produced his first Silbermann fortepiano for prof. Malcolm Bilson.

Since 1985 McNulty has made more than 300 pianos, with customers from different countries.

USA:

- Harvard University
- Cornell University
- Stanford University
- Oberlin College
- Malcolm Bilson
- Robert Levin
- Vladimir Feltsman

England:

- Kristian Bezuidenhout,
- Pawel Siwczak (whose instrument was played by Sir András Schiff in Wigmore Hall),
- Glyndebourne Festival,
- Royal Academy of Music (London),
- Royal College of Music (London);

Austria:

- Nikolaus Harnoncourt,
- Paul Badura-Skoda,
- Wien Konservatorium Privatuniversitat,
- Vienna Volksoper;

France:

- Opera National de Paris,
- Paris Conservatoire CNSMDP,
- Katia & Marielle Labeque.

Australia:

- Geoffrey Lancaster,
- Australian National University,
- Melbourne Recital Center.

Poland:

- Chopin's Institute Warsaw;

Germany:

- Klassik Stiftung Weimar,
- Trossingen, Koeln and Hannover Hochschule für Musik;

Switzerland:

- Schola Cantorum Basiliensis;

Netherlands:

- Ronald Brautigam,
- Amsterdam Conservatory,
- the Royal Conservatory of The Hague;

Denmark:

- The Royal Danish Opera;

China:

- Central Conservatory Beijing,

etc.

== List of instruments ==
- Fortepiano after Silbermann 1749
- Fortepiano after Johann Andreas Stein ca. 1788
- Fortepianos after Anton Walter 1792 and Walter & Sohn ca.1805
- Fortepiano after J. Fritz 1812
- Fortepianos after Conrad Graf 1819, 1822 and 1836
- Fortepiano after Buchholtz 1826
- Fortepiano after Ignaz Pleyel 1830
- Fortepiano after Boisselot 1846
- Fortepiano after Streicher 1868

== Recordings made with McNulty's instruments ==
- Ronald Brautigam. Ludwig van Beethoven. Complete works for solo piano. Vol.2. Played on Graf, Walter and Stein piano copies. Label: BIS
- Kristian Bezuidenhout. Wolfgang Amadeus Mozart. Keyboard Music. Vol.2. Played on a copy of Walter piano. Label: Harmonia Mundi
- Viviana Sofronitsky with Warsaw Chamber Opera Orchestra on Period Instruments. Complete Mozart Piano Concertos (11 CD box). Played on a copy of Walter piano. Label: Etcetera
- Viviana Sofronitsky. Franz Schubert. Wanderer Fantasy, Impromptus opp. 90 & 142. Played on a copy of the 1819 Graf piano. Label: CAvi
- Neal Peres De Costa. Pastoral Fables. Works for cor anglais and pianos. Played on a copy of Streicher piano. Label: ABC Classics
- Nikolaus Harnoncourt, Rudolf Buchbinder. Wolfgang Amadeus Mozart. Piano concertos No. 23&25. Played on a copy of Walter piano. Label: Sony
- Paul Badura-Skoda with Musica Florea. Wolfgang Amadeus Mozart. Piano concertos K.271, K.414. Played on a copy of Walter piano. Label: Arcana
- Robert Levin with the Academy of Ancient Music, Christopher Hogwood. Wolfgang Amadeus Mozart. Piano Concertos K271 & K414. Played on a copy of Walter piano. Label: L'Oiseau-Lyre
- Krzysztof Książek. Fryderyk Chopin, Karol Kurpiński. Piano Concerto No.2 f-moll (solo version), Mazurkas, Ballade; Fugue & Coda B-dur. Played on a copy of Buchholtz piano. Label: NIFCCD
- Music video: Pawel Siwczak, Ludwig van Beethoven, Adagio sostenuto "Quasi una fantasia" from Sonata No. 14 in C-sharp Minor, Op. 27 No. 2 ("Moonlight Sonata"). Played on Walter & Sohn piano copy. Label: Bach Club
- Viviana Sofronitsky, Sergei Istomin. Fryderyk Chopin. Complete works for cello and piano. Played on copies of the 1830 Pleyel and 1819 Graf pianos. Label: Passacaille

== See also ==
- Piano history and musical performance
