= Ignaz Pleyel =

Austrian composer and piano builder (1757–1831)

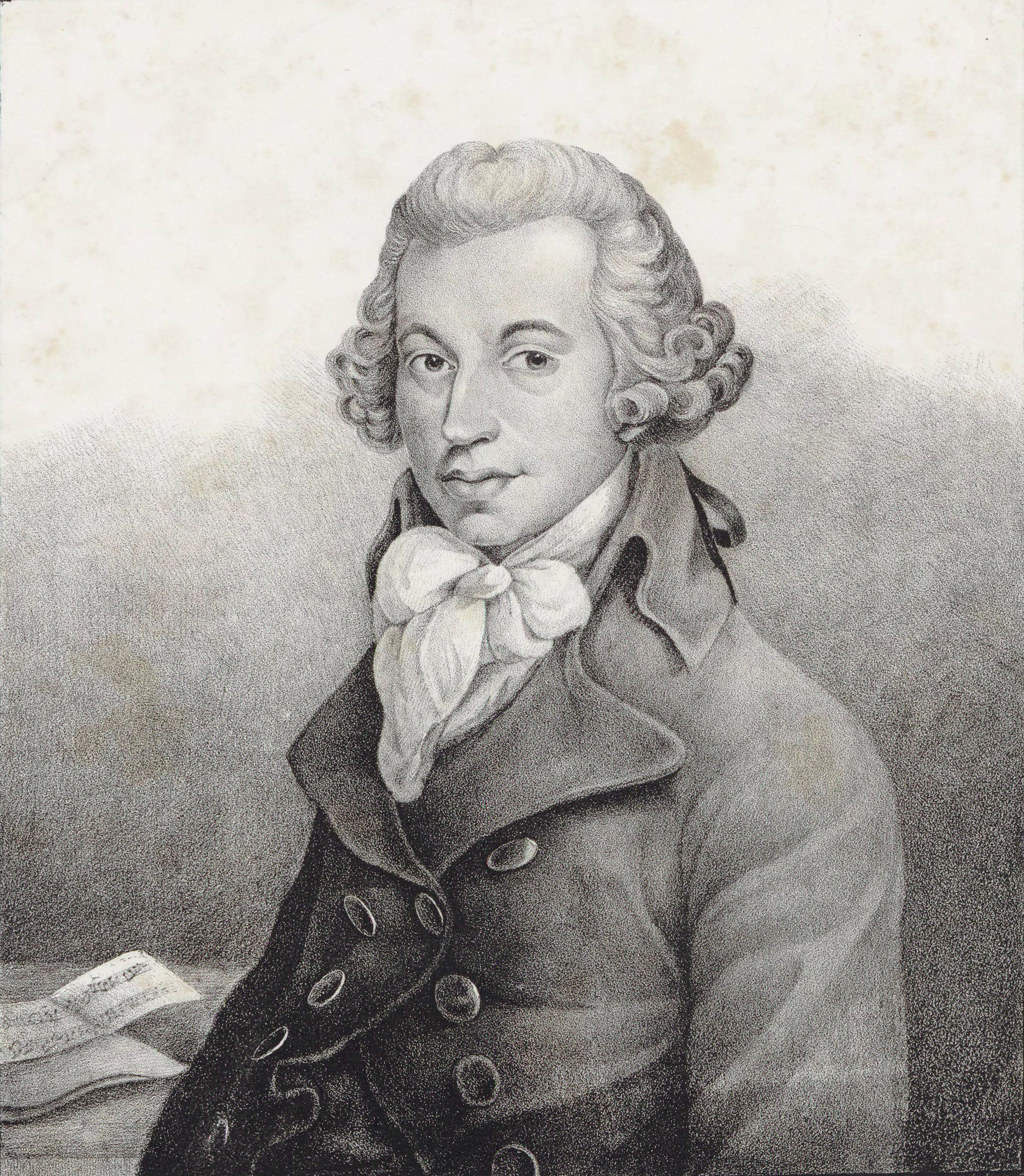
Ignaz Joseph Pleyel

Ignaz (Ignace) Joseph Pleyel (French: [plɛjɛl]; German: [ˈplaɪl̩]; 18 June 1757 – 14 November 1831) was an Austrian composer, music publisher and piano builder of the Classical period. He grew up in Austria (then part of the Holy Roman Empire), and was educated there; in his mid-twenties he moved to France, and was based in France for the rest of his life.

== Life ==
=== Early years ===
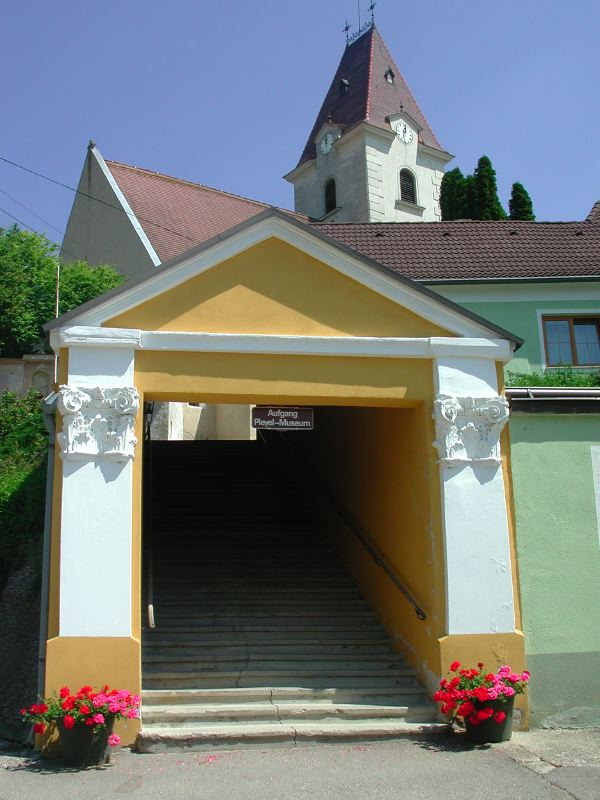
His birthplace in Ruppersthal, Lower Austria, now the Pleyel Museum

He was born in Ruppersthal in Lower Austria, the son of a schoolmaster named Martin Pleyl. Despite the fact that some sources claim that he had 37 siblings, he was the eighth and last child of his father's first marriage to Anna Theresia née Forster and he had eight more half siblings from his father's second marriage to Maria Anna née Placho. While still young, he probably studied with Johann Baptist Wanhal, and from 1772 he became the pupil of Joseph Haydn in Eisenstadt. As with Beethoven, born 13 years later, Pleyel benefited in his study from the sponsorship of aristocracy, in this case Count Ladislaus Erdődy (1746–1786). Pleyel evidently had a close relationship with Haydn, who considered him to be a superb student.

Among Pleyel's apprentice work from this time was a puppet opera Die Fee Urgele, (1776) performed in the marionette theater at the palace of Eszterháza and in Vienna. Pleyel apparently also wrote at least part of the overture of Haydn's opera Das abgebrannte Haus, from about the same time.

Pleyel's first professional position may have been as Kapellmeister for Count Erdődy, although this is not known for certain. Among his early publications was a set of six string quartets, his Opus number 1.

In the early 1780s, Pleyel visited Italy, where he composed an opera (Ifigenia in Aulide) and works commissioned by the king of Naples, Ferdinand I.

=== Strasbourg 1783–1795 ===
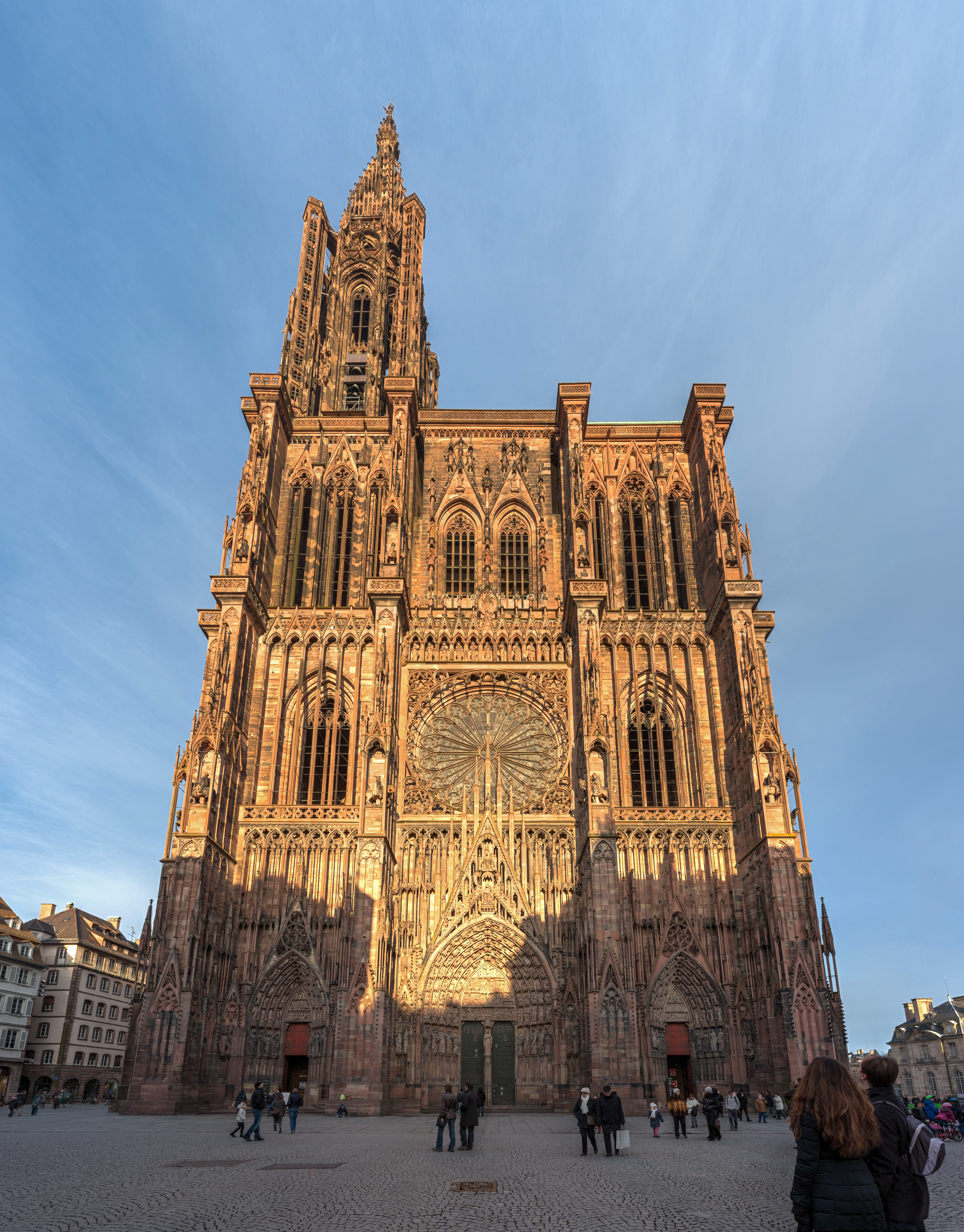
Strasbourg Cathedral

Attracted to the benefits associated with an organist position, Pleyel moved to Strasbourg, France, in 1783 to work alongside Franz Xaver Richter, the maître de chapelle at the Strasbourg Cathedral. The cathedral was extremely appealing to Pleyel as it possessed a full orchestra, a choir, and a large budget devoted to performances. After establishing himself in France, Pleyel voluntarily called himself by the French version of his name, Ignace. While he was the assistant maître de chapelle at Strasbourg Cathedral, he wrote more works than during any other period in his musical career (1783–1793). At the cathedral, he would organize concerts that featured his symphonies concertantes and liturgical music. After Richter's death in 1789, Pleyel assumed the function of full maître de chapelle. In 1788, Pleyel married Françoise-Gabrielle Lefebvre, the daughter of a Strasbourg carpet weaver. The couple had four children, the eldest being their son Camille. Marie Pleyel, née Moke (1811–1875), the future wife of Camille, became one of the most accomplished pianists of her time.

==== French Revolution and the Reign of Terror ====
In 1791, the French Revolution abolished musical performances in church as well as public concerts. Seeking alternative employment, Pleyel traveled to London, where he led the "Professional Concerts" organized by Wilhelm Cramer. In this capacity Pleyel inadvertently played the role of his teacher's rival, as Haydn was at the same time leading the concert series organized by Johann Peter Salomon. Although the two composers were rivals professionally, they remained on good terms personally.

Like Haydn, Pleyel made a fortune during his time in London. On his return to Strasbourg, he bought a large house, the moated Château d'Ittenwiller, about 35 km south of the city, between nearby Saint-Pierre and Eichhoffen in the Bas-Rhin department.

With the onset of the Reign of Terror in 1793 and 1794, life in France became dangerous for many, including Pleyel. He was brought before the Committee of Public Safety a total of seven times, due to his foreign status, his recent purchase of a château, and his ties with the Strasbourg Cathedral. He was subsequently labeled a "Royalist collaborator". The outcome of the committee's attentions could easily have been imprisonment or even execution. With prudent opportunism, Pleyel preserved his future by composing several pieces in honor of the new republic, all of which were written in Strasbourg around the time of the Terror. Those pieces, with dates of publication and details:

1. La Prise de Toulon ("The capture of Toulon") for solo and three-voice choir with piano accompaniment. (19 February 1794)
2. Hymne de Pleyel chanté au Temple de la Raison ("Hymn sung in the Temple of Reason") for choir with piano accompaniment. (1793 or 1794; dates disputed)
3. Hymne à l'Être Suprême ("Hymn to the Supreme Being") two part cantata (performed 8 June 1794)
4. La Révolution du 10 août ("The Revolution of August 10") for soloists, choir, and orchestra (10 August 1794)

Most of these compositions debuted at the Strasbourg Cathedral, which was known at the time as the Temple de l'Être Suprême (Temple of the Supreme Being), as churches were outlawed during the Terror. Pleyel became a naturalized French citizen and thus came to be known as Citoyen (citizen) Pleyel. With his involvement in artistic propaganda and loyalism to the new regime, Pleyel can be seen as the ultimate musical champion of Strasbourg republicanism.

In addition to composing the above works for the Strasbourg public, Pleyel also contributed to the Parisian music scene during the Revolution. One example is Le Jugement de Pâris, a pantomime-ballet by Citoyen (Citizen) Gardel and performed with Pleyel's music (along with that of Haydn and Étienne Méhul) on 5 March 1793.

=== Pleyel as businessman ===
Pleyel moved to Paris in 1795. In 1797, he set up a business as a music publisher ("Maison Pleyel"), which among other works produced a complete edition of Haydn's string quartets (1801), as well as the first miniature scores for study (the Bibliothèque musicale, "musical library"). The publishing business lasted for 39 years and published about 4,000 works during this time, including compositions by Adolphe Adam, Luigi Boccherini, Ludwig van Beethoven, Muzio Clementi, Johann Baptist Cramer, Johann Ladislaus Dussek, Johann Nepomuk Hummel, Wolfgang Amadeus Mozart, and Georges Onslow.

Pleyel visited Vienna on business in 1805, meeting his now elderly mentor Haydn for a final time and hearing Beethoven play.

In 1807, Pleyel became a manufacturer of pianos; for more on the Pleyel piano firm, see Pleyel et Cie.

=== Old age ===
Pleyel retired in 1824 and moved to the countryside about 50 km outside Paris. He died in 1831, apparently quite aware that his own musical style had been fully displaced by the new Romanticism in music. He was buried in Père Lachaise Cemetery in Paris.

== Pleyel's music ==
Pleyel was prolific, composing at least 42 symphonies, 70 string quartets, and several operas. Many of these works date from the Strasbourg period; Pleyel's production tailed off after he had become a businessman.

Recent scholarship has suggested that the theme for the Variations on a Theme by Haydn, by Johannes Brahms, Op. 56a, was probably composed not by Haydn, but by Ignaz Pleyel. Double bassist and musicologist Darija Andelic-Andzakovic announced in 2025 that her examination of the manuscript of one of the concerts formerly attributed to Johannes Matthias Sperger, the Double Bass Concerto in E-flat major, was in fact by Pleyel. It may have been performed in Pressburg (now Bratislava) when it was composed, but has not been played since. Its modern premiere was played by double bassist Robert Nairn and the Australian Brandenburg Orchestra in 2026.

Pleyel also wrote music for masonic rituals.

== Reputation and assessment ==
Pleyel is one instance of the phenomenon of a composer (others include Cherubini, Meyerbeer, and Thalberg) who was very famous in his own time but currently is obscure. Keefe (2005) describes a "craze for his music c. 1780–1800", and quotes a number of contemporary witnesses to this surge. For instance François-Joseph Fétis wrote, "What composer ever created more of a craze than Pleyel? Who enjoyed a more universal reputation or a more absolute domination of the field of instrumental music? Over more than twenty years, there was no amateur or professional musician who did not delight in his genius."

Pleyel's fame even reached the then-remote musical regions of America. There was a Pleyel Society on the island of Nantucket off the coast of Massachusetts, and tunes by Pleyel made their way into the then-popular shape note tunebooks. Pleyel's work is represented in the principal modern descendant of these books, The Sacred Harp.

In his own time, Pleyel's reputation rested at least in part on the undemanding character of his music. A reviewer writing in the Morning Herald of London (1791) said that Pleyel "is becoming even more popular than his master [Haydn], as his works are characterized less by the intricacies of science than the charm of simplicity and feeling." In the mid twentieth century, the harpsichord builder Wolfgang Zuckermann reminisced about playing Pleyel in his childhood in the 1930s: "When I was ten years old, my family string quartet played a lot of Pleyel since it was the only thing easy enough to keep us going. My cello part consisted of unending stretches of quarter notes played on open strings." Pleyel continues to be known today as a composer of didactic music. Generations of beginning violin and flute students, for example, learn to play the numerous duets he wrote for those instruments.

== Pleyel pianos and Salle Pleyel ==
The piano firm Pleyel et Cie was founded by Ignace Pleyel and continued by Pleyel's son Camille (1788–1855), a piano virtuoso who became his father's business partner as of 1815. The firm provided pianos used by Frédéric Chopin, who considered Pleyel pianos to be non plus ultra. It also ran a concert hall, the Salle Pleyel, in which Chopin performed his first—and also his last—Paris concerts. In September 2009 a replica of the 1830 model of Pleyel's piano was built by Paul McNulty which is now in the collection Fryderyk Chopin Institute in Warsaw and was used in the 1st International Chopin Competition on Period Instruments.

== Recordings ==
1. Yuan Sheng. Frederic Chopin. Ballades Nos 1–4/Impromptus Nos 1–4. Played on the 1845 Pleyel piano. Label: Piano Classics
2. Freddy Eichelberger. Beranger. Chansons. Pleyel 1845 piano. Early Piano series. CD 5. Label: Alpha Classics.
3. Ronald Brautigam. Felix Mendelssohn. Piano Concertos. Played on a copy of the 1830 Pleyel piano made by Paul McNulty. Label: BIS Records
4. Janusz Olejniczak ASIN B000026D1L, Chopin Evening Around 1831 Pleyel. Label: Opus 111
5. Alexei Lubimov. "Chopin, Bach, Mozart, Beethoven: at Chopin's home piano", played on the original 1843 upright Pleyel piano. Label: NIFCCD
6. Dina Yoffe. Fryderyk Chopin. Piano Concertos No 1 & 2. Version for one piano. Played on the 1848 Pleyel and the 1838 Erard pianos. Label: Fryderyk Chopin Institute
7. Viviana Sofronitsky, Sergei Istomin. Frederyk Chopin. Complete works for cello and piano. Played on a copy of the 1830 Pleyel piano made in 2010 by Paul McNulty. Label: Passacaille
8. Kevin Kenner. Fryderyk Chopin. 4 Impromptus. Played on the 1848 Pleyel piano. Label: Fryderyk Chopin Institute
9. Patrick Schneyder. Franz Liszt. Mazeppa. Early piano series. CD 10. Played on Pleyel piano 1846. Label: Alpha Classics.
10. Arthur Schoonderwoerd. Fryderyk Chopin. Mazurkas, Valses & other dances. Early Piano series. CD 7. Played on Pleyel piano 1836. Label: Alpha Classics.
11. Tomasz Ritter. Fryderyk Chopin. Sonata in B minor, Ballade in F minor, Polonaises, Mazurkas. Karol Kurpinski. Polonaise in D minor. Played on the 1842 Pleyel piano, the 1837 Erard piano and a copy of Buchholtz piano from ca 1825–1826 made by Paul McNulty. Label: Fryderyk Chopin Institute
