= I International Chopin Competition on Period Instruments =

The 1st International Chopin Competition on Period Instruments
- Awarded for: Classical music
- Date: 2-14 of September 2018
- Location: National Philharmonic in Warsaw
- Country: Warsaw, Poland
- Hosted by: Fryderyk Chopin Institute
- Website: http://www.iccpi.pl/en/

The 1st International Chopin Competition on Period Instruments was the inaugural edition of the International Chopin Competition in the piano class, held on September 2–14, 2018 in Warsaw on period instruments, organised by the Fryderyk Chopin Institute.

30 pianists from 9 countries were invited to participate. The auditions were divided into two stages, which took place on September 4–6 and September 8–10, and the final concerts lasted from September 12–13. The competition was won by Tomasz Ritter from Poland. The competition ended on September 14 with the winners' concert.

== Period piano instruments ==
The idea of the competition is to perform Chopin’s music on instruments it was composed for. Pianists could choose the piano they played during the competition from among five instruments selected by the jury: the Érard 1837 piano, which was chosen by 21 pianists, then followed by Pleyel 1842 - 19 pianists, the 1826 Buchholtz copy - 13 pianists and the 1819 Graf copy - 3 pianists (both by Paul McNulty), John Broadwood & Sons - 10 pianists. Unlike the International Chopin Piano Competition on contemporary instruments, the pianist could perform individual pieces on various instruments (maximum of three).
