= Paul Badura-Skoda =

Austrian pianist (1927–2019)

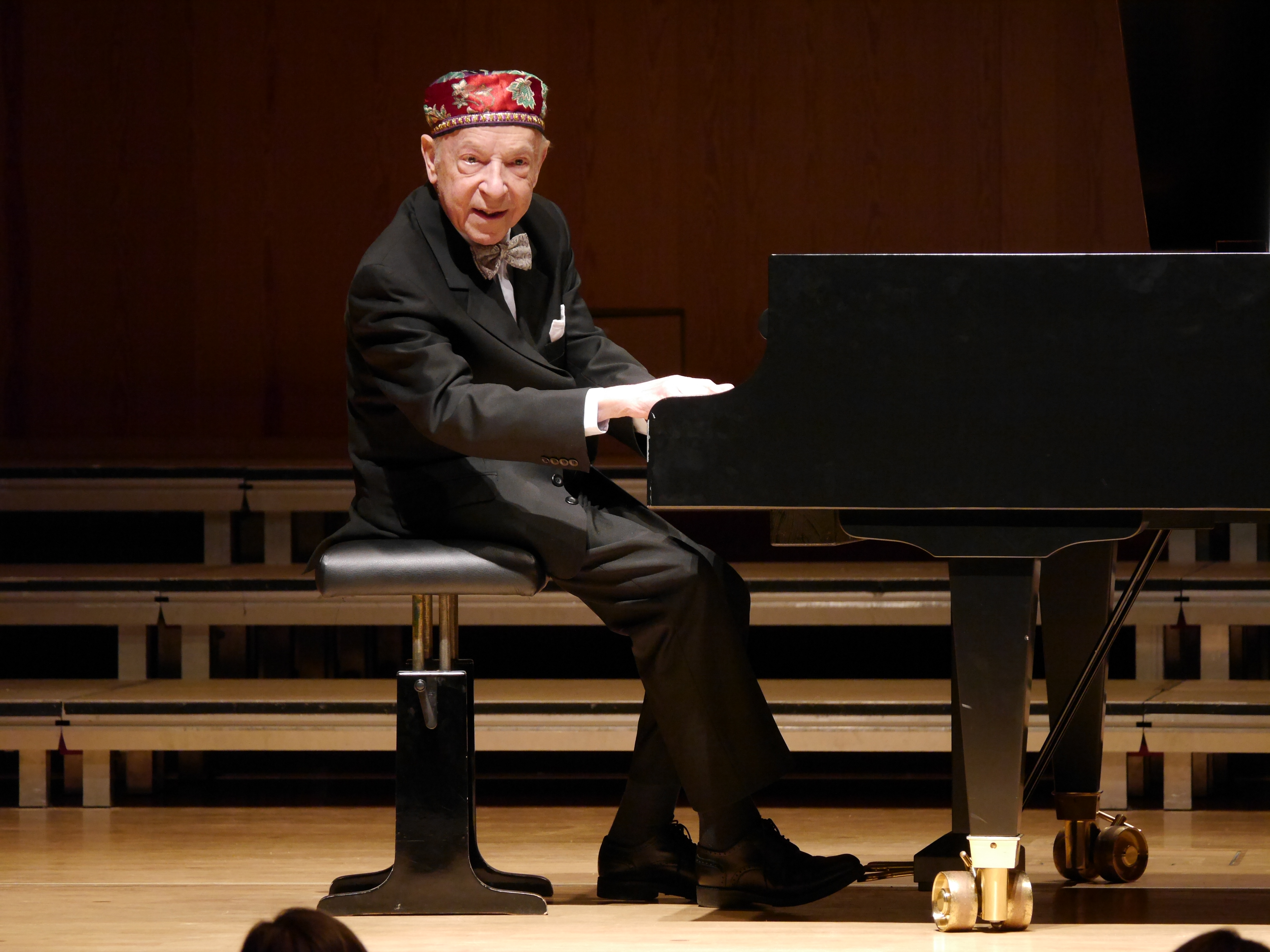
- Born: 6 October 1927; Vienna, Austria
- Died: 25 September 2019 (aged 91); Vienna
- Occupations: Pianist, musicologist, author
- Years active: 1947–2019
- Spouse: Eva Halfar (m. 1951, separation)
- Partner: Elisabeth Vilatte
- Children: Four, including the pianist Michael Badura-Skoda (1964–2001)

Paul Badura-Skoda (6 October 1927 – 25 September 2019) was an Austrian pianist.

== Career ==
A student of Edwin Fischer, Badura-Skoda first rose to prominence by winning first prize in the Austrian Music Competition in 1947. In 1949, he performed with conductors including Wilhelm Furtwängler and Herbert von Karajan; over his long career, he recorded with conductors including Hans Knappertsbusch, Hermann Scherchen, and George Szell. Along with his contemporaries Friedrich Gulda and Jörg Demus, he was part of the so-called "Viennese Troika".

He was best known for his performances of works by Mozart, Beethoven and Schubert, but had an extensive repertoire including many works of Chopin and Ravel. Badura-Skoda was well known for his performances on historical instruments, and owned several (his recording of the complete piano sonatas of Schubert is on five instruments from his private collection) (see "Recordings"). A prolific recording artist, Badura-Skoda made over 200 records, including many duplicates created to highlight the sound of different pianos. For instance, in a 2013 record, he recorded Schubert's last sonata three times on instruments from the 1820s, 1920s, and early 2000s (having already recorded the piece several times before); one of his box sets of the complete piano sonatas of Beethoven similarly included three different versions of the "Hammerklavier" Sonata. Indeed, he is the only person to have recorded the complete piano sonatas of Mozart, Beethoven, and Schubert on both historic and modern instruments.

His frequent collaborations with Demus included several duet recordings and performances, and a book on the interpretation of Beethoven's piano sonatas. Badura-Skoda also collaborated with Frank Martin, producing editions and recordings of his music, and several articles on it. In 1974 he completed an extensive tour of all the large cities in Southern Africa.

Badura-Skoda, who was considered one of the major pianists of his time, served on the jury of some of the most prestigious piano competitions (eg Paloma O'Shea Santander International Piano Competition in 1987). He was also well known for his musical scholarship, often along with his wife Eva Badura-Skoda. The Badura-Skodas edited one of the volumes of Mozart's piano concertos for the Neue Mozart-Ausgabe (Serie V/Werkgruppe 15/Band 5, consisting of K. 453, 456, and 459). They also produced books on the interpretation of the piano music of Mozart and the keyboard music of Johann Sebastian Bach, which were translated into several languages. Badura-Skoda also offered completed versions of several Schubert works never finished by the composer.

Badura-Skoda often played and recorded on modern piano and he also collected and restored pianos dating from the late eighteenth through the mid-nineteenth centuries. In 1980s he started working on a series of recordings of a selection of Haydn's sonatas and the complete piano sonatas of Mozart, Beethoven, and Schubert—twenty-seven CDs—on about a dozen of his historical instruments.

He died after a three-year battle with cancer on 25 September 2019.

== Honours and awards ==
- Austrian Cross of Honour for Science and Art, 1st class (1976)
- Bösendorfer-Ring (1978)
- Knight of the Legion of Honour (1993)
- Commander of the Ordre des Arts et des Lettres (1997)
- Gold Medal for Service to the City of Vienna (2007)
- Grand Decoration of Honour in Silver for Services to the Republic of Austria (2006)
- Honoris causa doctorate from Staatliche Hochschule für Musik und Darstellende Kunst Mannheim (2006)
- Honoris causa doctorate from Pontificia Universidad Católica del Perú (2010)
- Honoris causa doctorate from Academy of Music in Kraków (2013)

== Recordings ==
- Paul Badura-Skoda. Mozart. Pianoforte Sonatas. Played on a 1790 Johann Schantz fortepiano. Label: Astree Naive.
- Paul Badura-Skoda. Wolfgang Amadeus Mozart. Works for piano. Played on an Anton Walter 1790 fortepiano. Label: Gramola.
- Paul Badura-Skoda with Musica Florea. Wolfgang Amadeus Mozart. Piano concertos K.271, K.414. Played on a Walter 1792 fortepiano replica by Paul McNulty. Label: Arcana.
- Paul Badura-Skoda. Franz Schubert. Fantaisie Pour le Piano-forte. Played on a Conrad Graf 1824 fortepiano. Label: Astree.
- Paul Badura-Skoda. Plays Claude Debussy. Recorded at Vienna (Austria), May 14 & 16, 1984, on a Bösendorfer 290 Imperial made in 1923.
- Charles Mackerras (conductor), Paul Badura-Skoda, Polish Radio Symphony Orchestra. Shostakovich. Symphony No.9; Scriabin, Piano Concerto; Dvořák, Symphonic Variations. Label: Pristine Audio.
- Paul Badura-Skoda, Vienna Symphony Orchestra, Henry Swoboda (conductor). Rimsky-Korsakov. Piano Concerto. Label: Pristine Audio.
- Paul Badura-Skoda with David Oistrakh. "The Last Recital", live recording at the Musikverein Concert Hall in Vienna on May 29, 1974. Label: GENUIN.

== See also ==
- List of Austrians in music
