= Fryderyk Chopin Institute =

Organization researching and promoting Frédéric Chopin

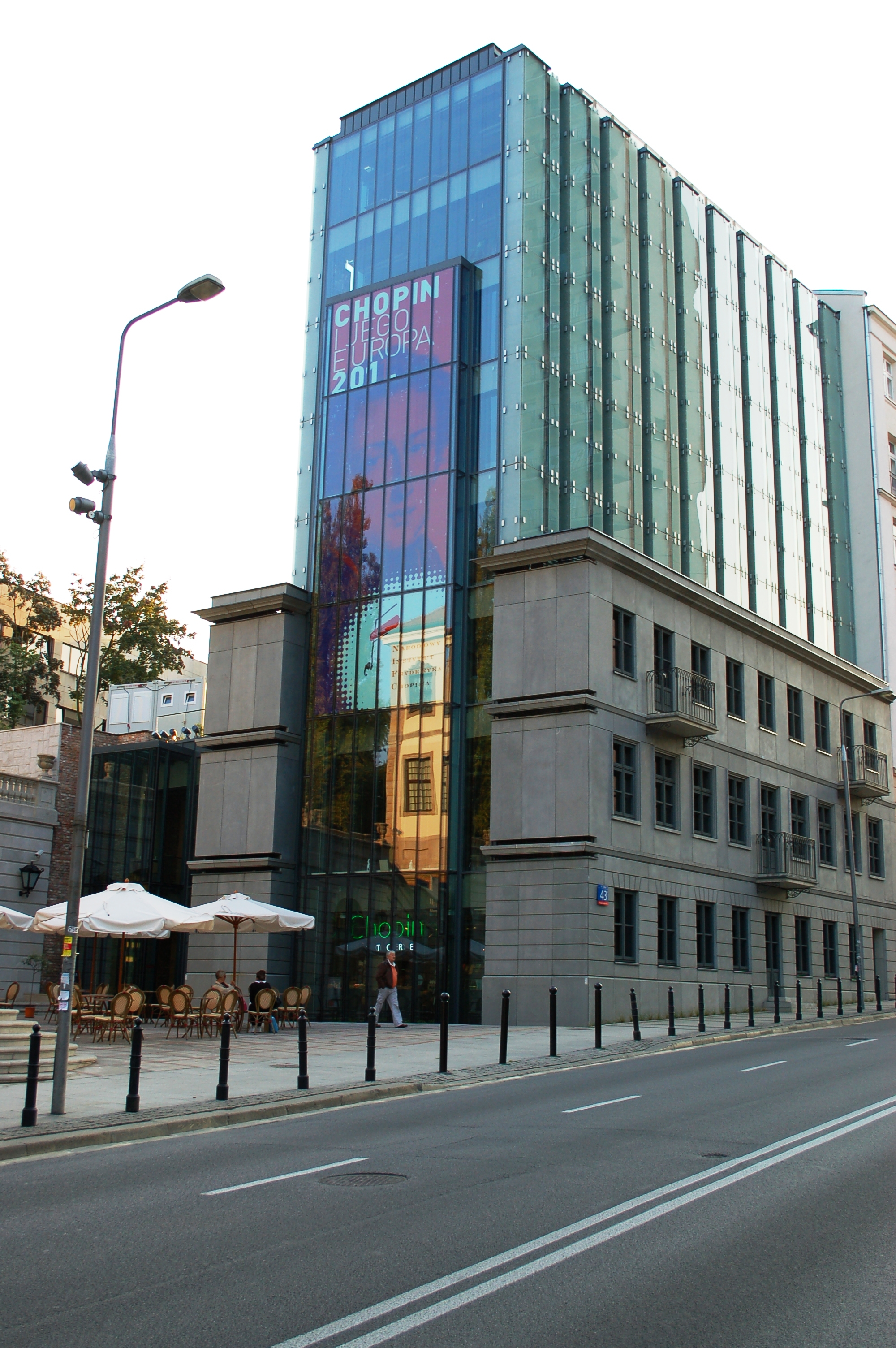
- Formation: 3 February 2001; 25 years ago
- Purpose: Research on Frédéric Chopin
- Headquarters: Warsaw, Poland
- Website: nifc.pl/en

The Fryderyk Chopin Institute (Polish: Narodowy Instytut Fryderyka Chopina) is a Polish organization, headquartered in Warsaw, dedicated to researching and promoting the life and works of Polish composer Frédéric Chopin.

It was created in 2001 by an act of the Polish Parliament and is under direct control of the Ministry of Culture and National Heritage.

== Activities ==
The activities of the institute include publications, organization of concerts, conserving the physical and artistic Chopin heritage, monitoring the commercial use of Chopin's name and operating a Chopin Information Centre (the institute's website). Amongst its publication projects is a complete facsimile edition of Chopin's works, compiled from all available holograph manuscripts, edited by Zofia Chechlińska.

The institute operates the Fryderyk Chopin Museum and the five-yearly International Chopin Piano Competition. It also runs the "Young Talents" programme to encourage young Polish pianists.

The institute has also been organizing the festival Chopin and his Europe since 2005. It presents European music in the context of its links with the life and work of Chopin. One of the objectives of the festival programme is historical performance, presenting works as they were originally heard, on period instruments. The festival is organised in collaboration with the Warsaw Philharmonic, the Grand Theatre and the Polskie Radio Program II.

=== Chopin competition ===
The International Chopin Piano Competition (Polish: Międzynarodowy Konkurs Pianistyczny im. Fryderyka Chopina) is a piano competition held in Warsaw, Poland, since 1927. Since 2010, it has been hosted by the Chopin Institute, having previously been organized by the Ministry of Culture (until 1960) and then the Chopin Society (from 1960 to 2005).

In 2018, the institute organized the International Chopin Competition on Period Instruments. The second competition in this new series proceeded in 2023.

=== Chopin museum ===
The Fryderyk Chopin Museum (Polish: Muzeum Fryderyka Chopina) in Warsaw was established in 1954. Since 2005, it has been operated by the Fryderyk Chopin Institute.
