= Polygraph (duplicating device) =

Duplicating device using pen and ink

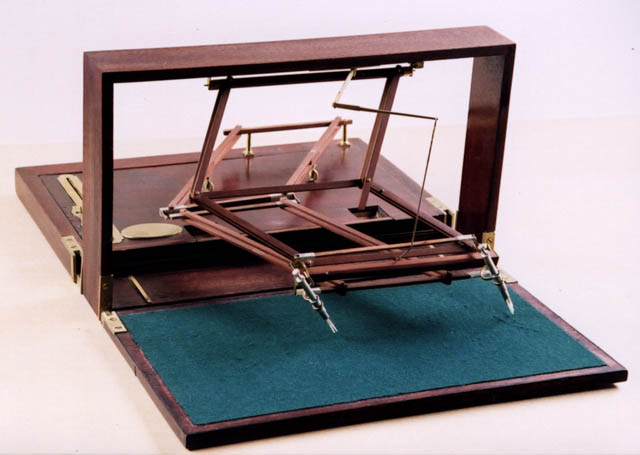
Reproduction of Jefferson's polygraph at the Smithsonian Institution

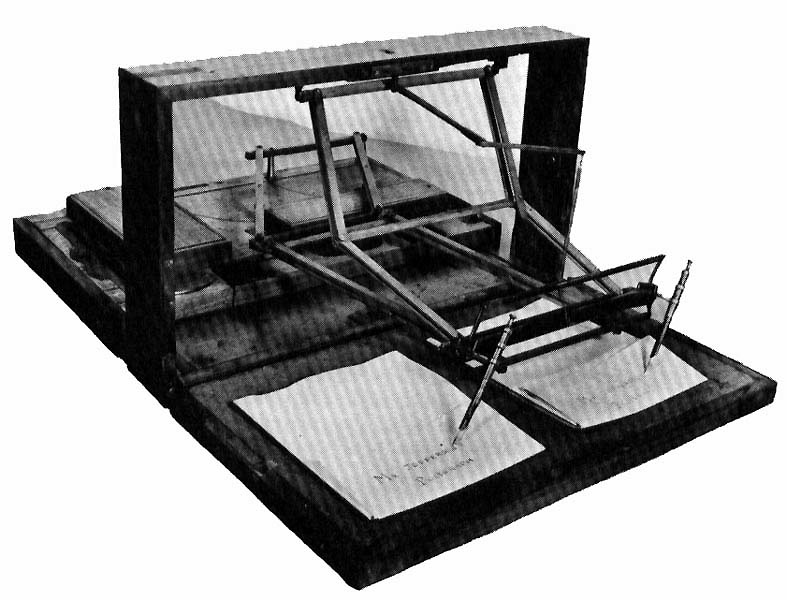
One of the polygraphs used by Thomas Jefferson, a portable version

A polygraph is a duplicating device that produces a copy of a piece of writing simultaneously with the creation of the original, using pens and ink.

Patented by John Isaac Hawkins on May 17, 1803, it was most famously used by the third U.S. president, Thomas Jefferson, who acquired his first polygraph in 1804 and later suggested improvements to Charles Willson Peale, owner of the American rights. Because Jefferson was a prolific letter writer, the preservation of his copies have offered historians extensive insights into Jefferson's viewpoints and actions. Jefferson called the polygraph "the finest invention of the present age".

Another American, Benjamin Henry Latrobe, was the first customer of Peale's and not only introduced the device to Jefferson but was also instrumental in its improvement.

Mechanisms of this type are more generally known as pantographs, which include simple devices for making copies at various enlargements or reductions by tracing over a drawing.

== Description of the device ==
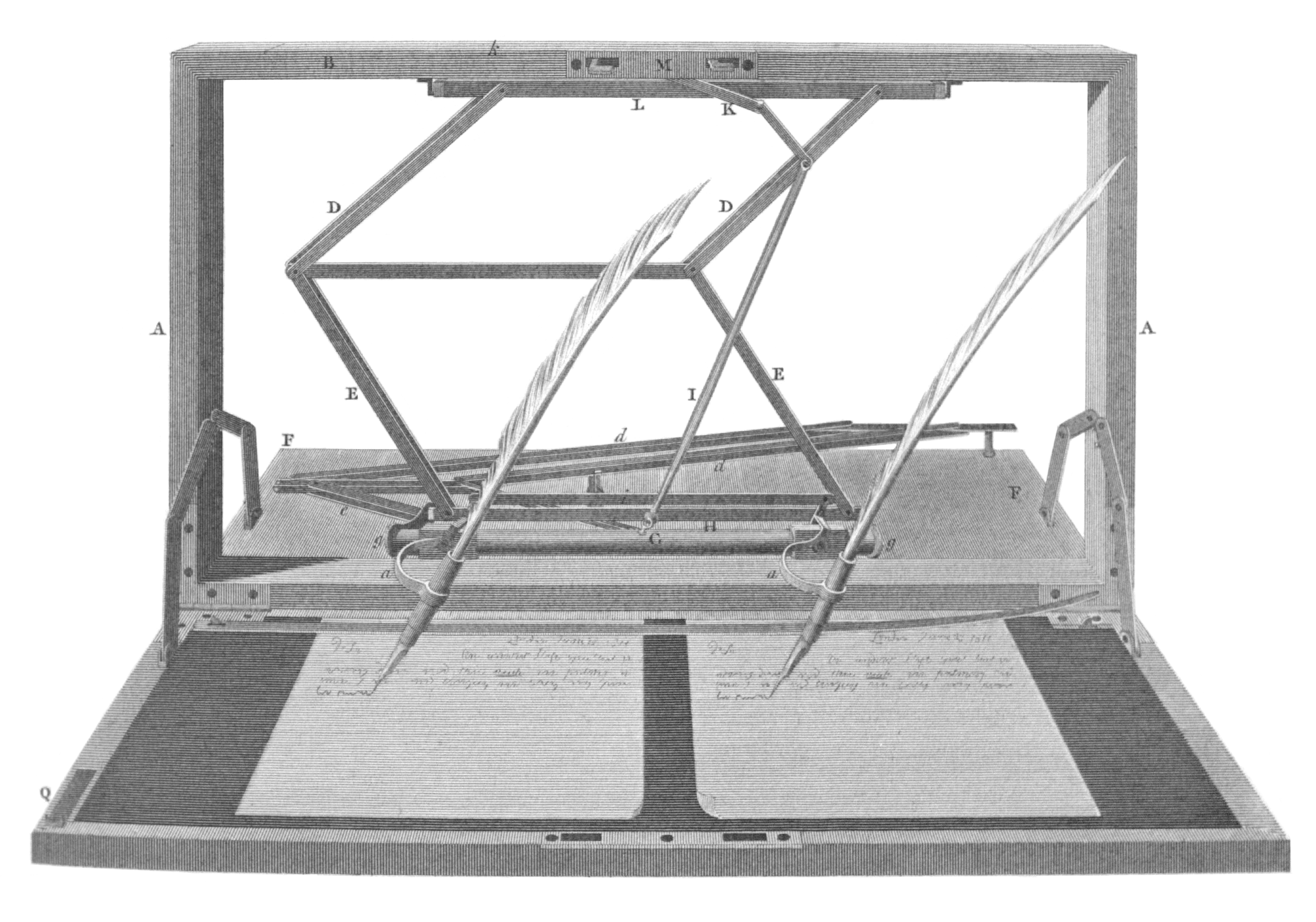
Annotated engraving of Hawkin's Polygraph from Rees's Cyclopædia, c. 1820

=== Stationary parts ===
==== Platform ====
The platform forms both a writing surface (in part) and a base and reference plane for the moving and other stationary parts ("F" in diagram). In a portable device the platform is in two parts that form the covers of the enclosure formed for transport. As suggested by Jefferson, a non-portable version uses a single board for the entire platform.

==== Bridge ====
Also known as a "gallows frame", the bridge spans the platform ("A" and "B" in diagram). In the non-portable device this is mounted on posts permanently attached to the platform. In the portable version the bridge, side posts, and a bottom cross piece form the outer rim of enclosure when in the state for transportation.

The bridge divides the platform into two portions, the part toward the user upon which the papers are placed (see illustration above), and the stationary part away from the user that contains a portion of the planar pantograph. The function of the bridge is to form a base for the vertical movement linkage and a support for the suspension spring support beam.

==== Inkwells ====
Inkwells are provided beneath the bridge for each pen at corresponding locations. The dipping of the master pen will thus re-ink the slave pen.

=== Moving parts ===
The device consists of two pens transmitting motion in five degrees of freedom through four interlinked mechanisms:

1. A horizontal pantograph maintains identical planar (X and Y axis) movement, with two degrees of freedom
2. An angled pantograph descending from the bridge maintains identical vertical (Z axis) movement
3. A torsion beam maintains identical pen fore-and-aft tilt
4. A parallel linkage maintains identical pen side-to-side tilt

In addition, a vertical suspension spring balances the weight of the moving parts.

==== Planar pantograph ====
The range of the planar mechanism must be sufficient to encompass the papers (individually) being written upon and allow access for each pen to its respective inkwell.

A simple pantograph is used to translate the planar motion of one pen to the other. The pantograph consists of two complete variable parallelograms ("d" and "e" in diagram):

- Base parallelogram: The base parallelogram is attached to two fixed pivot points at the far side of the base plate. The pivoting arms are supported at their midpoints by wheels which rest on the base and this part remains in a plane parallel to the base.
- Extension parallelogram: The extension parallelogram is attached to the base parallelogram by pivots that allow the pen-side edge to be lifted away from the base.

==== Descending pantograph ====
A second pair of parallelogram links maintains vertical correspondence between the two pens ("D" and "E" in diagram). These consist of two variable parallelogram frames attached at a common edge, one of which is also attached to the bridge, while the other is attached to one of the pen supports at each corner. The projecting sides of the upper frame consist of parallel linkages.

==== Pen lift transfer ====
The combination of forces between the horizontal and vertical enables the pen lift of the principal pen grasped by the user from the paper to be transferred to the copying pen.

- Pen mounts: Each pen is mounted in such a way that it allows the pen to be used at various angles, necessary to allow a normal writing style. The pens are offset from their pivots by a short stem that projects at right angles from below the midpoint of the pen, allowing the pen to be grasped in whatever way is usual to the user ("a" in diagram).
- Pen tilt (fore and aft): A torsion beam joins the pen mounts to maintain correspondence of tilt with respect to the direction away from the user ("G" in diagram).
- Pen tilt (side-to-side): A parallel linkage maintains correspondence of tilt with respect to a direction parallel to the front face of the device ("H" in diagram).
- Suspension beam and spring: At the center of the bridge a beam projects horizontally toward the user ("K" in diagram), from which a vertical suspension spring ("I" in diagram) balances most of the weight of the moving parts so that the user is neither fatigued by using the device nor is required to adjust their writing style.

== Viewing in museums ==
Original polygraphs may be viewed at a number of locations around the world.

Some United States locations:

- Monticello, Jefferson's estate in Virginia
- Smithsonian National Museum of American History, Washington, D.C.

== Patent ==
The original American patent document for the polygraph, issued to John J. Hawkins on May 17, 1803, was lost in a Patent Office fire in 1836.

== A modern version ==
The Griffin Discovery Room at Monticello contains a simplified and durable version, intended for use by children.

== See also ==
- Autopen, another signature duplicating device
- LongPen, a remote signing device conceived by writer Margaret Atwood
- Telautograph, another remote signing device, patented by Elisha Gray in 1888
