= Autopen =

Device for automatically signing a signature or autograph

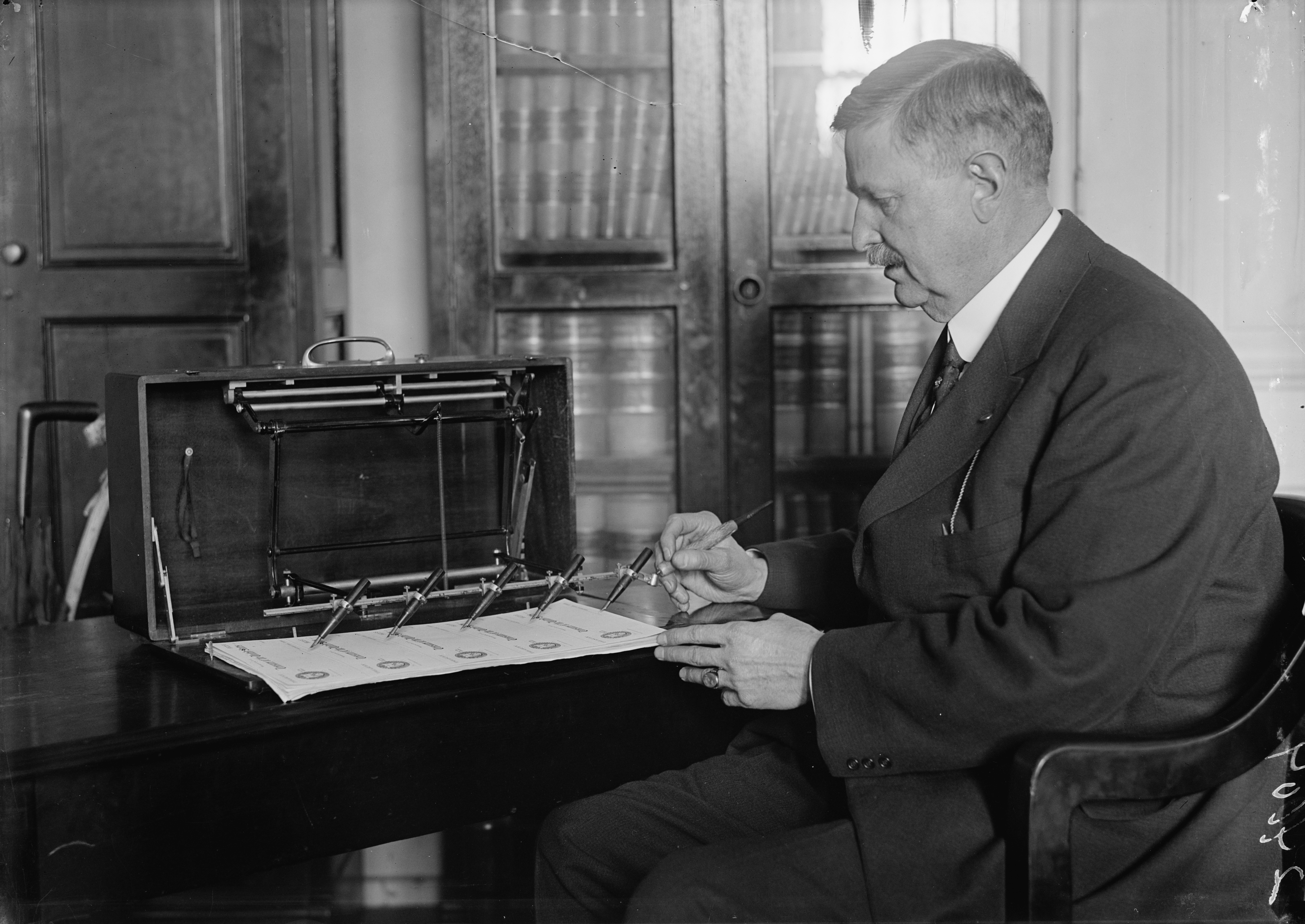
U.S. Treasury Department check-signing machine, operated by J. L. Summers in 1918

An automatic pen, or autopen (informally known as a signing machine), is a mechanical device used for the replicated signing of a human signature.

Prominent individuals may be asked to provide their signatures many times a day, such as celebrities receiving requests for autographs, or politicians signing documents and correspondence in their official capacities. Consequently, many public figures employ autopens to allow their signature to be printed on demand and without their direct involvement.

Twenty-first-century autopens are machines programmed with a signature subsequently reproduced by a motorized mechanical arm.

Given the similarity to the real hand signature, the use of an autopen allows for plausible deniability as to whether a famous autograph is real or reproduced, thus increasing the perception of the personal value of the signature by the recipient. However, known or suspected autopen signatures are also vastly less valuable as philographic collectibles; legitimate hand-signed documents from individuals known also to use an autopen usually require verification and provenance to be considered valid. In 2005, the United States Department of Justice responded to an inquiry regarding the use of autopen by the President of the United States, finding its use consistent with the language found in Article I, Section 7 of the Constitution.

Early autopens used a plastic (PMMA) matrix of the original signature, which is a channel cut into an engraved plate in the shape of a wheel. A stylus driven by an electric motor followed the x- and y-axis of a profile or shape engraved in the plate. The stylus is mechanically connected to an arm which can hold almost any common writing instrument, so that one's pen and ink can be used to suggest authenticity. The autopen signature is made with even pressure and indentation in the paper, which is how these machines are distinguishable from original handwriting where the pressure varies.

== History ==
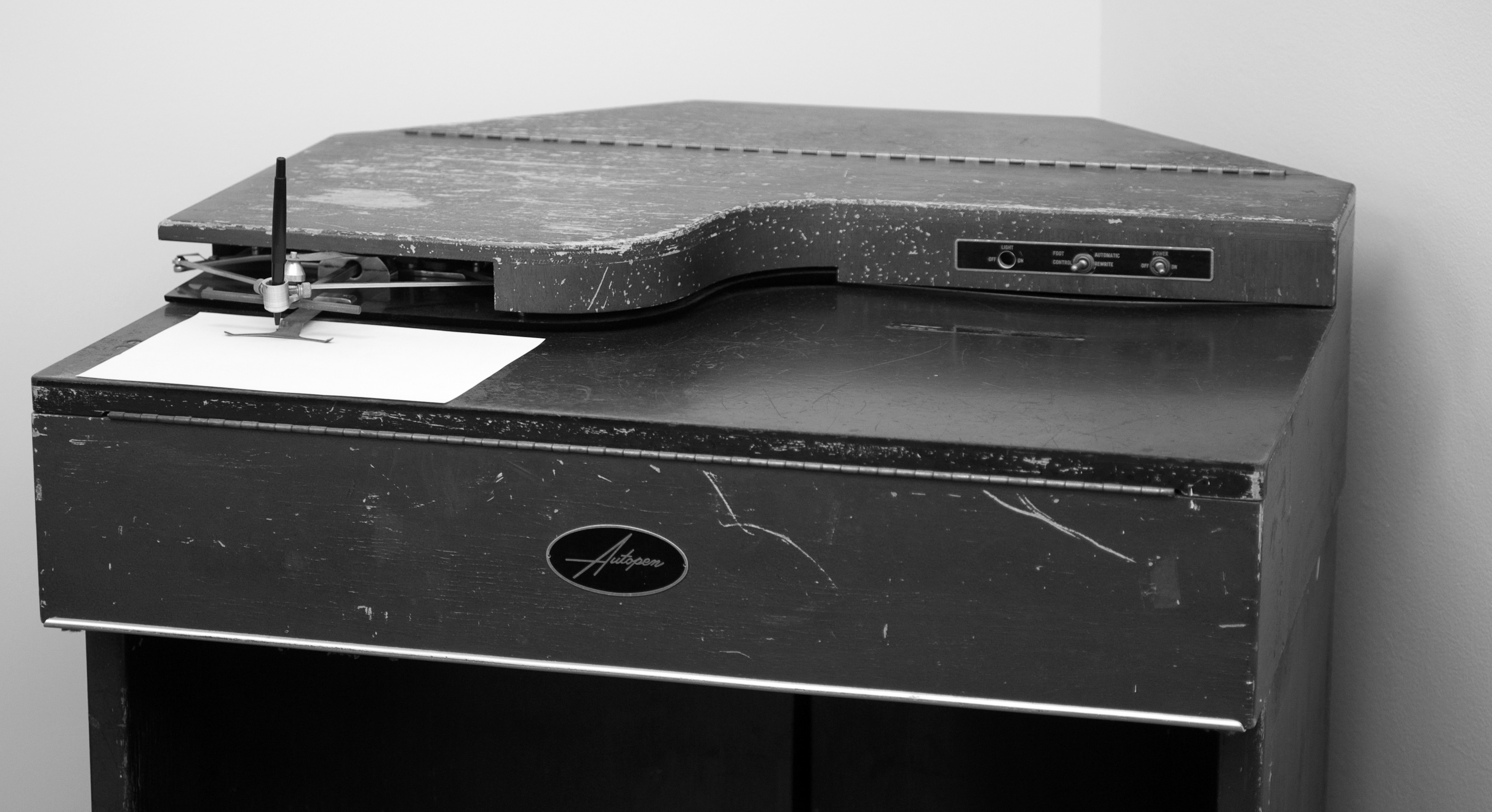
The Autopen Model 50 from the International Autopen Company

The first signature duplicating machines were developed by British American inventor John Isaac Hawkins, who received a United States patent for his device in 1803, called a polygraph (an abstracted version of the pantograph) in which the user may write with one pen and have their writing simultaneously reproduced by an attached second pen. Thomas Jefferson used the device extensively during his presidency. This device bears little resemblance to today's autopens in design or operation.

The autopen called the Robot Pen was developed in the 1930s, and became commercially available in 1937 to record a signer's signature, used as a storage unit device, similar in principle to how vinyl records store information. A small segment of the record could be removed and stored elsewhere to prevent misuse. The machine would then be able to mass-produce a template signature when needed.

While the Robot Pen was commercially available, the first commercially successful autopen was developed by Robert M. De Shazo Jr., in 1942. De Shazo developed the technology that became the modern autopen in reference to a Request For Quote (RFQ) from the Navy, and in 1942, received an order for the machine from the United States Secretary of the Navy. This was the beginning of a significant market in government for the autopen, as the machines soon ended up in the offices of members of Congress, the Senate and the Executive branches. At one point, De Shazo estimated there were more than 500 autopens in use in Washington, D.C.

== Use ==
Individuals who use autopens often do not disclose this publicly. Signatures generated by machines are valued less than those created manually, and perceived by their recipients as somewhat inauthentic. In 2004, Donald Rumsfeld, then the U.S. Secretary of Defense, incurred criticism after it was discovered that his office used an autopen to sign letters of condolence to families of American soldiers who were killed in war.

Outside of politics, it was reported in November 2022 that some copies of The Philosophy of Modern Song, a book by singer-songwriter Bob Dylan that had been published earlier that month, had been signed with an autopen, resulting in criticism. Autographed editions had been marketed as "hand-signed" and priced at US$600 each. Both Dylan and the book's publisher, Simon & Schuster, issued apologies; refunds were also offered to customers who had bought autopen-signed editions. In addition, Dylan also said that some prints of his artwork sold after 2019 had been signed with an autopen, which he further apologized for and attributed his use of the machine to vertigo and the COVID-19 pandemic, the latter of which prevented him from meeting with staff to facilitate signing the works in question.

=== U.S. presidents ===
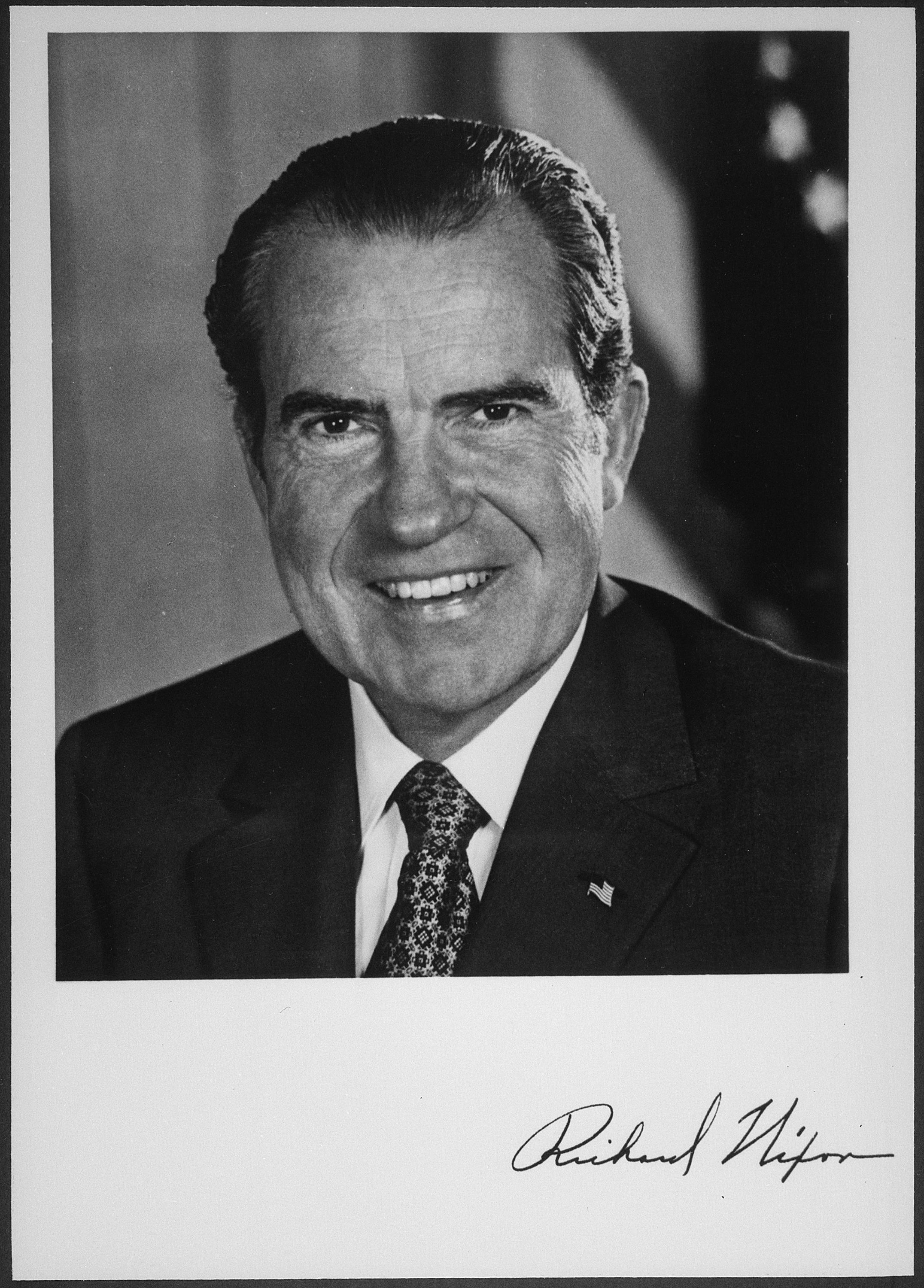
Portrait of U.S. President Richard Nixon with autopen signature

A precursor to the autopen was an instrument called the polygraph (unrelated to the modern device of the same name). While a person using the polygraph wrote an original document on one side of the machine, the device would mechanically facsimile a copy on the opposite side. When President Thomas Jefferson discovered the device, he purchased two: one for the White House, and one for his home at Monticello. Although the device could only make copies at the same time that a user was creating an original, a fully automated version was invented in the 1930s. According to National Journal, some sources say that Harry S. Truman was the first U.S. president to use an autopen, though he limited his use of it to signing checks and answering mail. The first confirmed president to sign legislation with it was Barack Obama. Others credit Gerald Ford as the first president to openly acknowledge his use of the autopen.

While visiting France, Barack Obama authorized the use of an autopen to create his signature, signing into law an extension of three provisions of the Patriot Act. On January 3, 2013, he signed the extension to the Bush tax cuts, using the autopen while vacationing in Hawaii. In order to sign it by the required deadline, his other alternative would have been to have had the bill flown to him overnight. Republican leaders questioned whether this use of the autopen met the constitutional requirement for signing a bill into law, but the validity of presidential use of an autopen had not been actually tested in court. In 2005, George W. Bush asked for and received a favorable opinion from the Department of Justice regarding the constitutionality of using the autopen, but did not use it.

In May 2024, Joe Biden directed an autopen be used to sign legislation providing a one-week funding extension for the Federal Aviation Administration. Biden was traveling in San Francisco at the time, and wished to avoid any lapse in FAA operations, while a five-year funding bill was being voted on by Congress.

In March 2025, Donald Trump, while admitting that he sometimes uses an autopen for unimportant papers, said that pardons for members of the January 6th Committee issued during Biden's presidency were void due to them allegedly being signed by autopen. Earlier in 2024, the Fourth Circuit Court of Appeals ruled that pardons do not have to be made in writing in Rosemond v. Hudgins. The following May, the House Oversight Committee, led by Republican Representative James Comer, announced an investigation into Biden's health and mental fitness during his presidency, focusing specifically on Biden's use of an autopen.

In September 2025, Trump unveiled a sequence of portraits of serving and past presidents of the United States, in which Biden's portrait was replaced by a photograph of an autopen signing his name. In October 2025, the Republican-led House Oversight Committee claimed that Biden's autopen pardons were invalid because of autopen use, and called for the Department of Justice to open a new investigation into the Biden administration. On November 28, 2025, Trump made a post on Truth Social claiming that he had declared "any document" signed by Biden via autopen to be void because the device had been used "illegally" without his involvement, and stated that Biden would be charged with perjury if he claimed otherwise. It is unclear whether Trump has the legal authority to do so. In March 2026, The Washington Post reported that under pressure by Trump, the Justice Department had investigated the autopen allegations though was ultimately unable to move forward with making a case.

== Similar devices ==
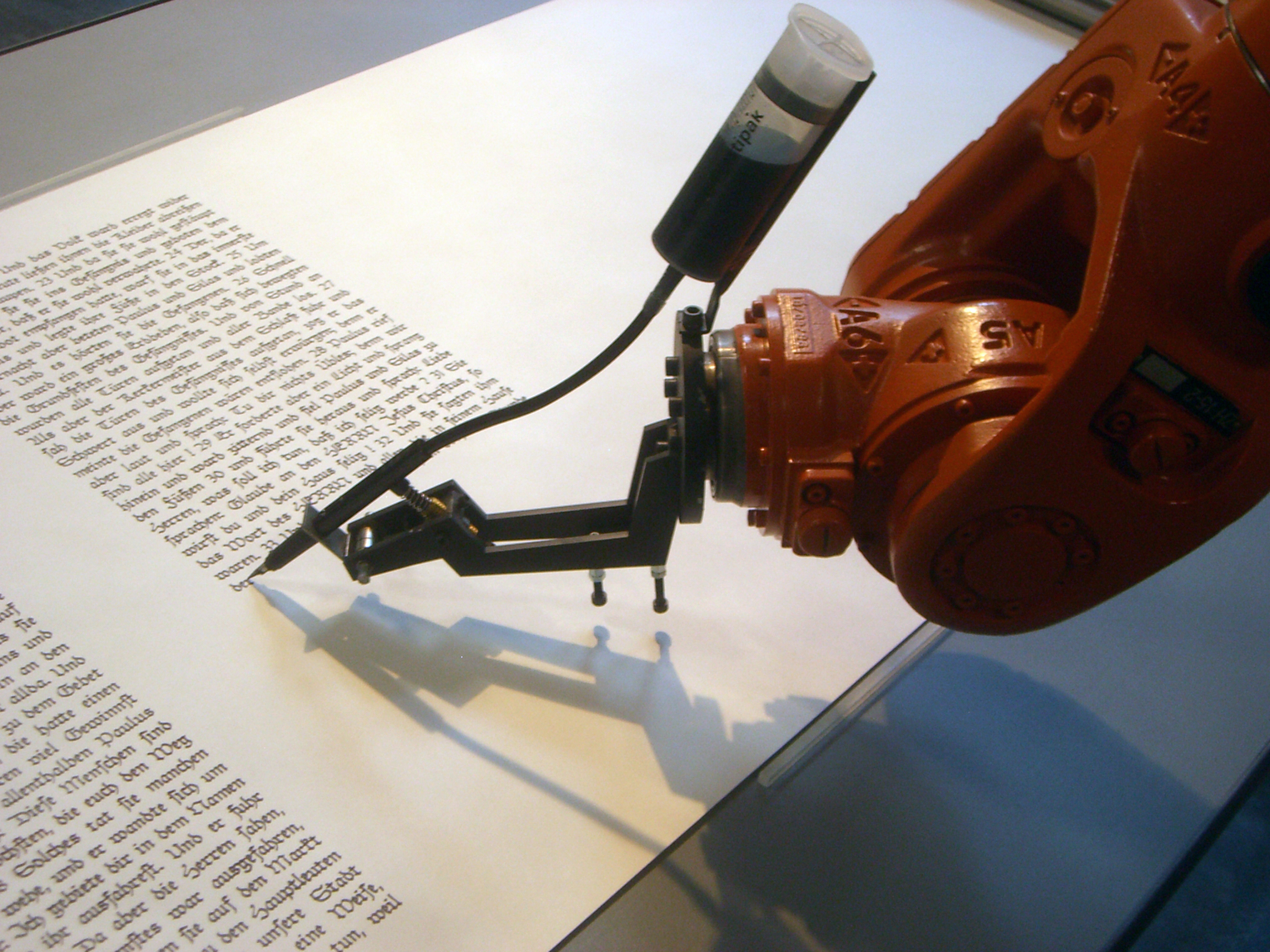
Bios robotlab writing robot

Further developing the class of devices known as autopens, Canadian author Margaret Atwood invented a device called the LongPen, which allows audio and video conversation between the fan and author while a book is being signed remotely.

== See also ==
- John Hancock
- Plotter
- Rubber stamp (politics)
- Seals in the Sinosphere
- Telautograph
