= Piano Sonata No. 15 (Beethoven) =

Piano sonata written by Beethoven

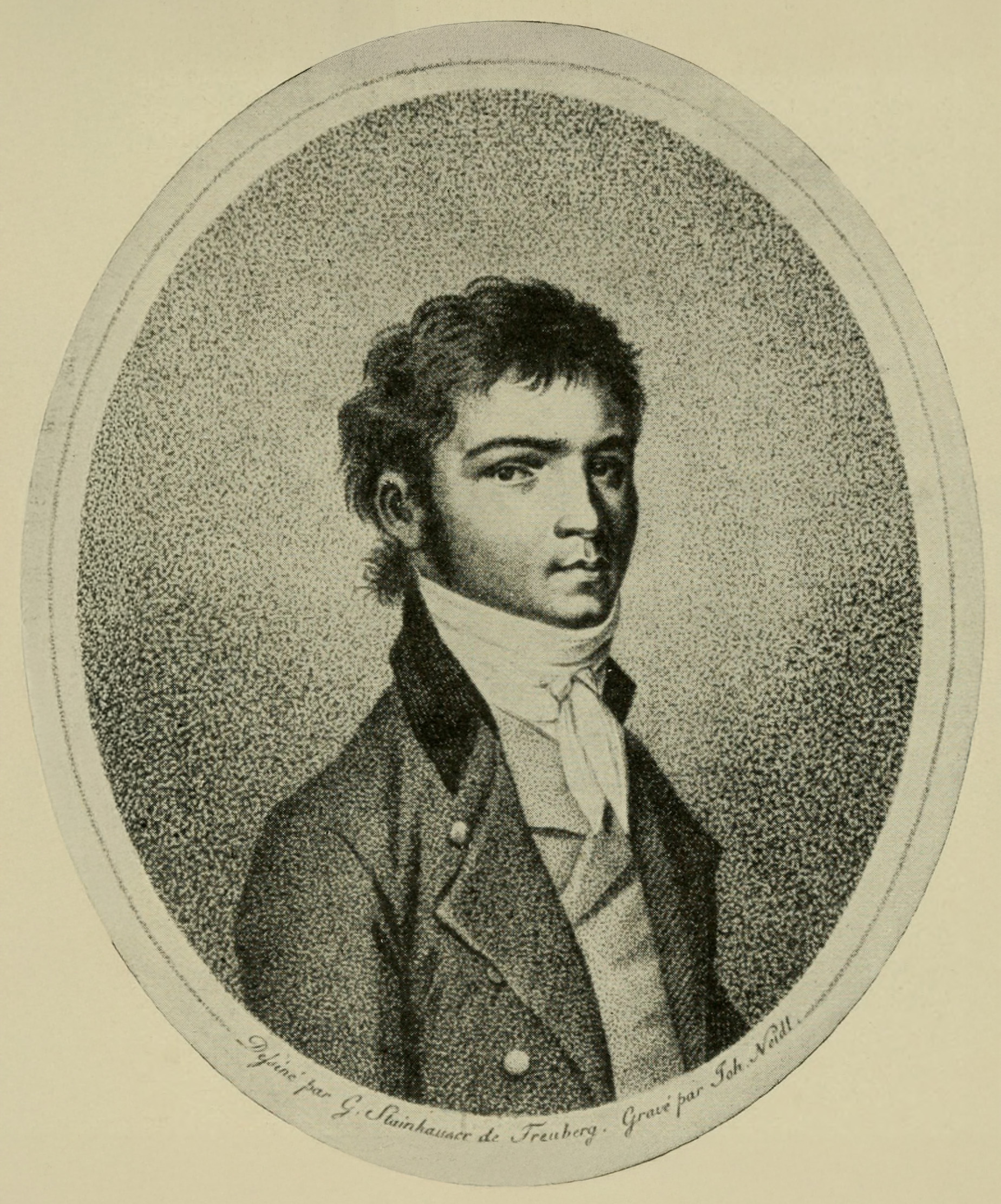
Portrait of Ludwig van Beethoven, aged 29

Piano Sonata No. 15 in D major, Op. 28, is a piano sonata by Ludwig van Beethoven. The name Pastoral or Pastorale became known through A. Cranz publishing of Beethoven's work, but was coined by a London publisher, Broderip & Wilkinson. While not as famous as its immediate predecessor, Piano Sonata No. 14, it is generally admired for its intricate technicality as well as for its beauty. The sonata takes roughly twenty-five minutes to play with its intended repeats.

Published in 1801, the work is dedicated to the Count Joseph von Sonnenfels.

== Structure ==
I. Allegro

II. Andante

III. Scherzo. Allegro vivace

IV. Rondo. Allegro ma non troppo
Performed by Artur Schnabel in 1932

The sonata is in D major, and follows the typical four-movement form of the classical sonata.

1. Allegro, 3/4
2. Andante in D minor, 2/4
3. Scherzo: Allegro vivace, 3/4
4. Rondo: Allegro ma non troppo, 6/8

=== I. Allegro ===
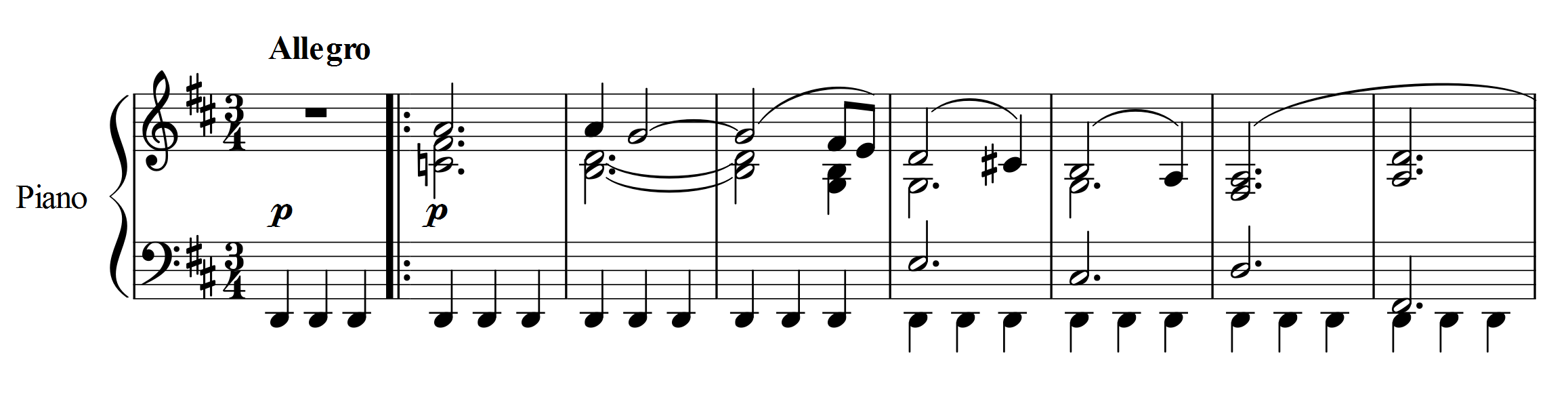

The first movement, Allegro, begins in the tonic major with a repetitive and monotone bass line sometimes described as "timpanic." This droning theme continues in various forms throughout the sonata. On top is the simple primary theme of the movement. Eventually, the work introduces a second, more tense melody in F♯ minor, which builds up into a passage of constant quavers (eighth notes). The development of the movement runs through various minor keys, ever becoming more dramatic and angst-filled as it compresses the main theme into a repeated one-bar rhythm, which gradually fades away. It then recapitulates back into the themes of the beginning.

=== II. Andante ===
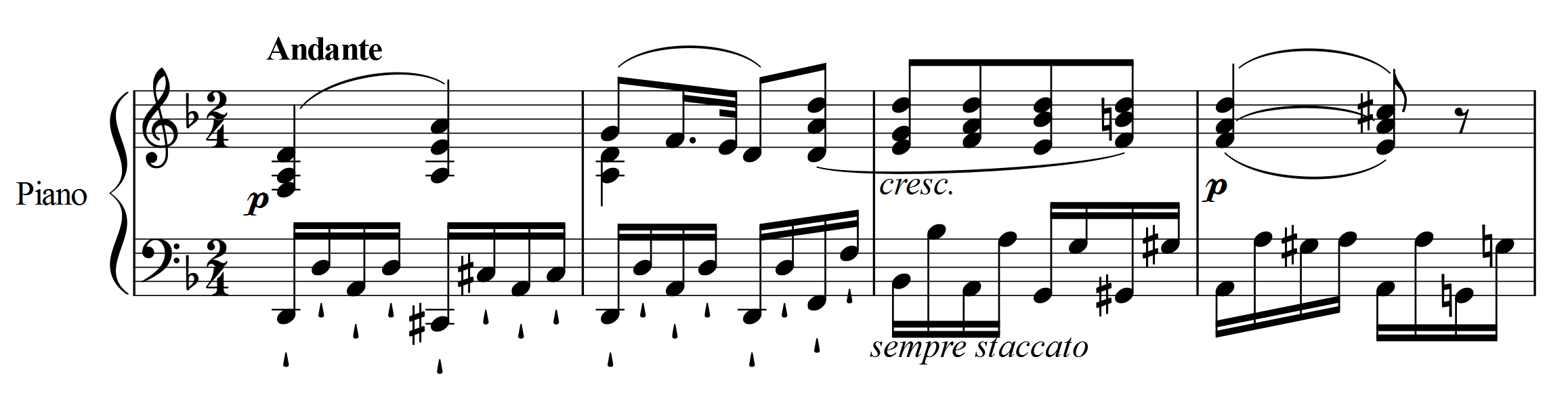

The Andante movement is in D minor. The primary feature is the staccato semiquaver bass. There is a slight diversion in the tonic major involving dialogue between a dotted, staccato rhythm and a set of semiquaver triplets. It then returns to the primary melody.

=== III. Scherzo: Allegro vivace ===
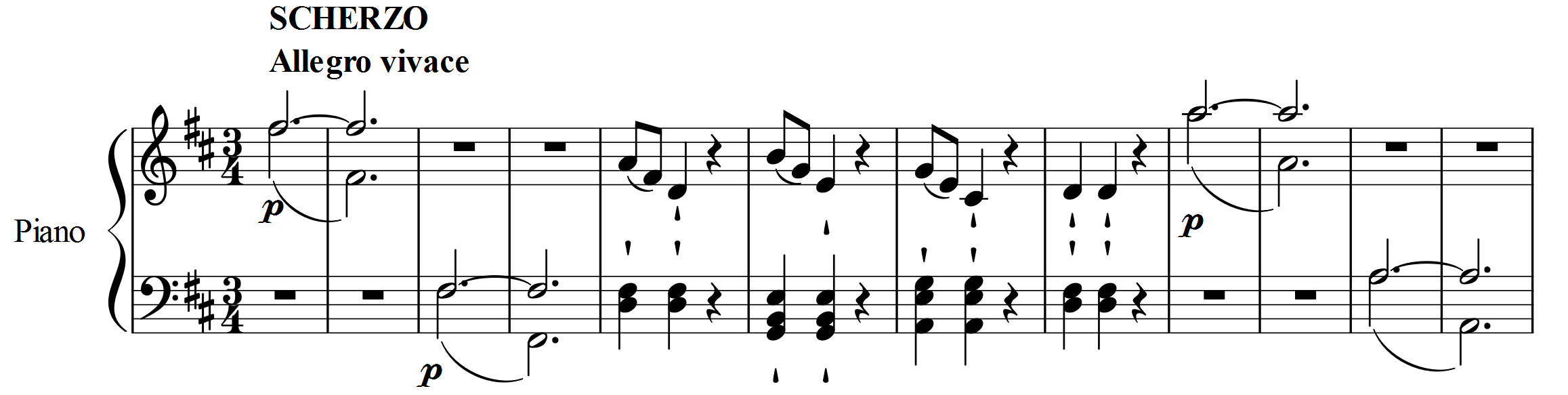

The Scherzo is in D major. Its most important feature is the contrast between four long notes, each an octave apart, and a fast quaver melody. The trio, in B minor, repeats a simple four-bar melody eight times over, with a relentless broken octave–chord bass figuration adding harmonic, rhythmic, and dynamic intensity as the repeats progress. It provides a diversion to the blithe scherzo, contrasting sharply in tone and adding gravity to the prevailing humor.

=== IV. Rondo: Allegro ma non troppo ===
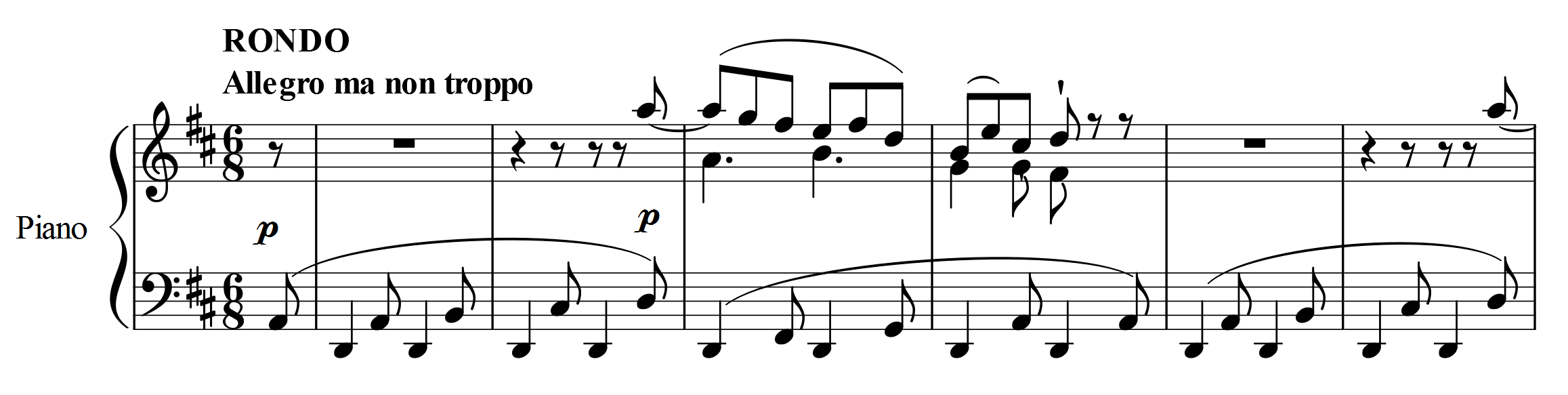

The finale is a rondo. Out of not only his piano sonatas but all of his published works up to this point, this is the first time that Beethoven decides to write ma non troppo. Some critics attribute the repeating bass line to a bagpipe, others to a dancing gigue. Beethoven employs various amusing, interesting and very adventurous episodes, all with different moods, rhythms, and harmonic texture. The coda, played a little faster than the allegro (Più allegro), can be termed as the only 'virtuoso' passage in the whole sonata.

== "Pastoral" ==
It has been debated whether the title "pastoral" refers to the sense of countryside and nature (the 6th symphony pastoral sense), or to its sense of calm, simplicity and lightness. Beethoven's publishers had a tendency to name his sonatas without consulting Beethoven himself.
