= Machine quilting =

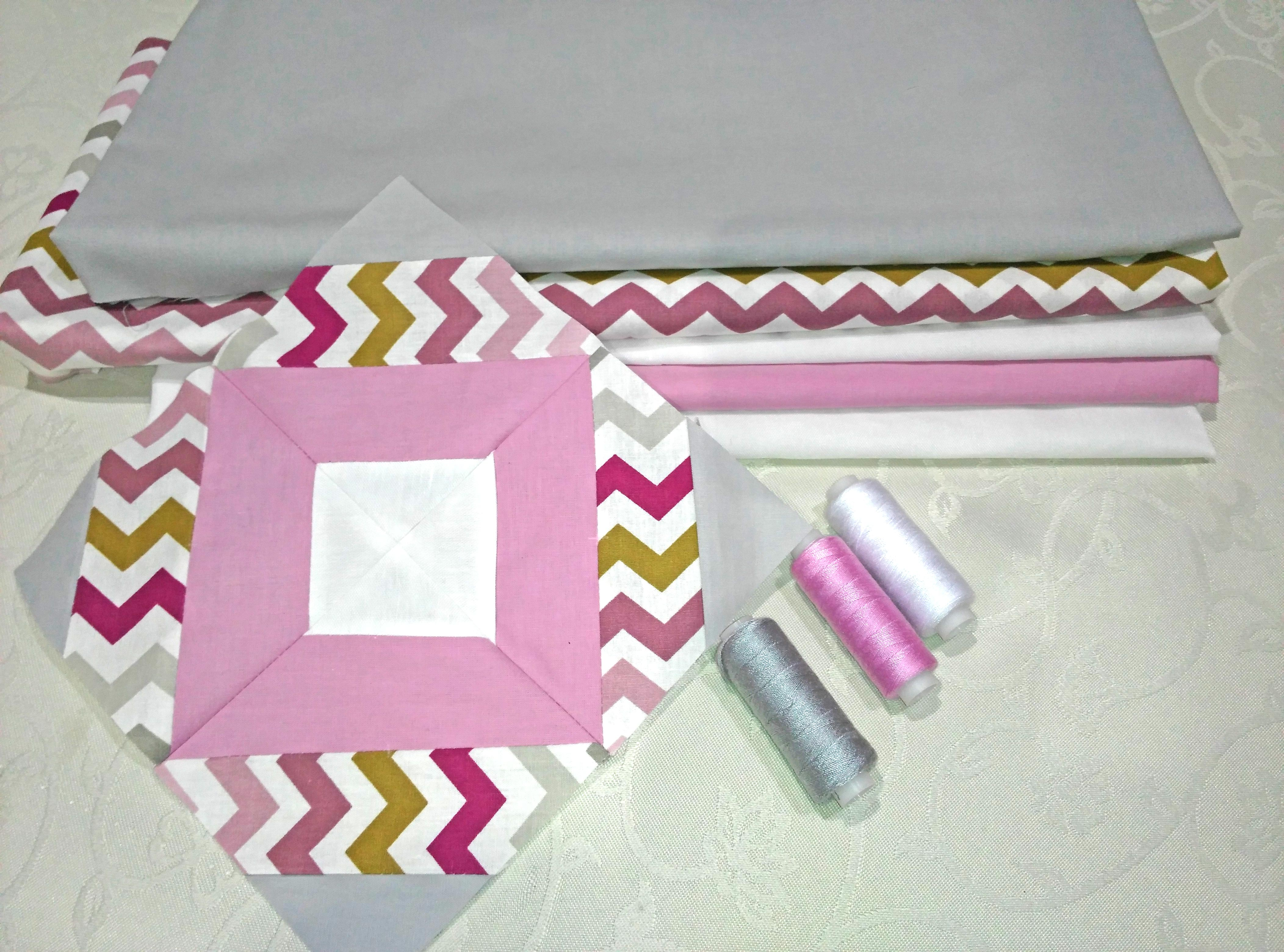
Quilt block design

Machine quilting is quilting made using a sewing machine to stitch in rows or patterns using select techniques to stitch through layers of fabric and batting in the manner of old-style hand-quilting. Some machines even replicate hand stitching, for example Sashiko or running stitch quilting.

== History ==
Quilting or stitching together layers of padding and fabric, may date back as far as 3400 BCE. While sewing machines are commonly used to piece such quilts as patchwork tops, it is rare to find a vintage quilt that was not hand quilted. Regular (domestic) sewing machines have been used to hold layers of a quilt together since they were invented, however, it wasn't until the 1990s that this productive skill became acceptable and has now replaced hand quilting in popularity. Quilting in the past was primarily a practical technique to provide insulation, although decorative elements were often also present. Quilting is now a popular hobby and many modern quilts are primarily art pieces. Modern quilting has existed in many forms for much of the 20th century. It wasn't until the 2000s that quilts with a modern aesthetic began to appear in greater numbers and quilters began to describe themselves as modern. The growth of the modern quilting movement was facilitated by the following factors: the art being recognized by the general public, the availability of affordable digital photography equipment, the changes in the fabric industry and increased use of social media.

== Techniques ==
To begin any machine quilting, the three layers of the quilt, the quilt top, batting and backing fabric, are temporarily basted either with safety pins or with basting spray.

=== Walking Foot quilting ===
Stitching in a straight line is normally accomplished by replacing the normal presser foot with an even feed walking foot attachment. This gadget was designed to avoid puckering by advancing multiple layers at the same rate as the feed dogs of the machine. With the feed dogs up, the length of the stitch is controlled by the stitch length setting on the machine. Straight line quilting is made easier when you use the walking foot and sew slowly.

=== Free-motion quilting ===
Free-motion quilting is a process used to stitch the layers of a quilt together using a domestic sewing machine with the feed dogs lowered, with a darning foot installed. When the feed dogs are lowered they do not advance the fabric; and with the darning foot merely hovering over the layers, the operator controls the stitch length as well as the direction of the stitching line by moving the quilt with their hands. The stitching can be made in any direction and to for curvilinear lines or straight patterns. Each design, whether drawn on the quilt top or held in the imagination of the quilter, is formed with a line of stitching that is guided by the movement of the quilt under the machine needle. The length of each stitch is determined by the distance the quilt has been moved since the previous stitch. Free-motion quilting can also be done using rulers or templates. These rulers require a ruler foot, attached to your sewing machine. The ruler foot than helps guide the ruler as you stitch, helping to establish designs in a more consistent fashion.

== Heirloom machine quilting ==
Heirloom machine quilting is a more advanced quilting technique using a sewing machine. In 1985, Harriet Hargrave coined the term heirloom machine quilting. It was Hargrave's determination to use her domestic sewing machine to replicate the look of hand quilting that compelled her to originate this art. For heirloom machine quilting, the operator uses advanced free-motion techniques. The scale of the work is refined, using smaller threads and needles that allow the use of detailed and complex patterns.

Quilts with heirloom machine quilting usually include background quilting which fills the negative space around the designs with dense stitching. This creates contrast between the curvilinear shapes and the flattened background space using stippling, echo quilting, repeated patterns, or geometric grids. The intricate quilted designs produce three dimensions on the surface of the quilt through the play of light and shadows. Motifs puff up, appear brighter because the high areas catch the light; while low areas recede into the depth of the shadow.

== See also ==
- Longarm quilting
- Quilting
