= Longarm quilting =

Quilting method using a sewing machine

Longarm quilting is the process by which a longarm sewing machine is used to sew together a quilt top, quilt batting and quilt backing into a finished quilt.

A complete longarming system typically consists of a sewing machine head, a frame, a table with a layer of plastic (under which is placed a pantograph), and several rollers on which the fabric layers and batting are attached. The longarm sewing machine frame typically ranges in length from 10 to 14 feet (3.05 to 4.27 metres), and the head is industrial length, 19 to 30 inches (48.26 to 76.20 centimetres).

Quilting using a longarm machine can take significantly less time than quilting by hand or more traditional machine quilting methods. This time saving is a large factor in the gain in popularity of longarm quilting.

A longarm sewing machine with a quilt top placed on the frame.

== History ==
The advent of the sewing machine led to an idea known as a "quilting machine", which made its debut in 1871.

The first quilting frame and machine consisted only of two bars that allowed the user to move the quilt and the frame beneath the machine to quilt straight, parallel lines on the fabric. By roughly 1877, the design had been modified, and began to look similar to the design quilters now know as a longarm quilting machine.

Before electricity, the operator used a hand crank to move the machine along the rails and over the fabric.

Almost 30 years later, the designs and patents for quilting machines had changed drastically.

While the Depression era caused a decrease in the interest in sewing machines and an increase in hand sewing, the quilting machine still managed to take on new designs. During the past 20 years the longarm sewing machine has become a popular and familiar concept to quilters.

== Advantages ==
The speed and ease with which a quilter can have a quilt top finished by a longarm quilter has caused an increase in recent years for quilting. These machines allow quilters to have their quilts finished without going through the time-consuming process associated with normal machine quilting or hand quilting. Sewers (or sewists, piecers, or quilters) can now take their finished quilt tops to professional longarm quilting businesses and pay a fee to have their quilting done by a longarm quilter. The availability of relatively quick and reasonably affordable quilting services has helped to cause a surge in the quilting business and an overall growth in interest in quilting as an art form.

== Equipment ==
The longarm quilting machine comes equipped with a sewing machine head, a worktable, several fabric rollers, and a metal frame. The overall dimensions of the frame can range from 10 to 14 feet in length by two-and-a-half to four feet in depth. The machine comes equipped with a table region. The table size ranges in lengths like the machine. Larger table sizes can accommodate up to king sized quilts. Typically, the table contains a flat region on which a layer of thin, clear plastic lies, on which patterns and other designs to follow can be placed.

The sewing machine head is large and made of industrial strength metal. It can be either hand-guided or computer guided, with controls at both the front and back ends to guide the head. For a full range of movement, the sewing machine head is placed on wheels that run on metal tracks along the frame of the machine. The sewing machine head can also come with a laser pointer, which can be used to guide the quilter along patterns, called pantographs. Pantographs are placed underneath the clear plastic region of the table. The hand-guided machine head contains handles by which the quilter can guide the machine along the fabric to sew the design of choice. A computer-guided machine head is hooked up to a computer system that allows the quilter to select the chosen design to be sewn onto the fabrics. With the push of a button on the computer's keyboard, the longarm sewing machine will sew the design onto the quilt with minimal physical assistance.

The frame of the machine consists of several rolling bars onto which layers of the quilt sandwich are placed. On one side of the machine, two rollers, known as the feeder bars, are present with a muslin leader onto which the backing and the quilt top can be attached. Material is attached by sewing pins, a snap system, or sewing zippers to the muslin leaders and then the material is stretched tight over the belly bar, which ensures that the layered material is smooth and taut according to the sewers’ desires.

The backing of the quilt is attached by sewing pins, a snap system, or zippers to a third roller, known as the "take-up" roller. The take-up roller is the region onto which the quilted layers can be moved to allow the quilter to gain access to a new region of quilt top. The backing, quilt top, and batting are commonly basted together by a single-row of stitching, but can also be pinned together onto the muslin leader on the take-up roller. The stretched region of fabric that spans between the take-up roller and the feeder rollers is the area over which the fabric layers are actually sewn together into the finished product. The longarm quilting machine typically comes with electronic controls that allow the user to adjust the fabric that spans the area over which the machine runs.

== Types of longarm quilting ==
The two major styles of quilting typically done by longarm quilting machines are pantograph designs, including "edge-to-edge" and custom work. Longarm machines can also come equipped with computers that will create a pantograph style design on the quilt top with the quilter resetting the needle for every section of the design.

=== Pantograph designs ===
A pantograph is a long design that spans the length of the longarm table. The longarm quilter will take the pantograph design and place it beneath the plastic layer on the table and then trace this design using the laser or stylus found on their machine head. The design typically spans the length of the quilt and can be repeated in rows to produce an all-over design on the quilt top. This method of longarm machine quilting is popular due to the minimal amount of work required by the longarm quilter themselves.

=== Custom work ===
Custom work is done when the sewer wishes for the quilt blocks to contain individual designs in each block or area of the quilt. This method is typically more time-consuming for the longarm quilter and is a more expensive method for having a piece quilted. Depending on the type of quilting work desired by the customer, the process can require additional time and resources for the longarm quilter. Some sewing styles, like meandering, which entails an all over fill-in design, require less attention to detail and can be done quickly. Other styles and designs, like feathers and motifs, require the longarm quilter to pay more attention to details and alignment and therefore can be time-consuming and costly.

== Manufacturers of longarm quilting machines ==
Ten or more major companies in Northern America currently manufacture and sell longarm quilting machines. As with models of cars, longarm sewing machines come in different types and sizes, with different features and options. A true longarm machine is generally defined by their 'throat' size, meaning the distance from the back of the 'sewing harp' to the needle. A mid-arm machine is generally 15" while a traditional longarm is 16" to 30", with, 16/18/20/21/22/24/30" options.

Sizes can range from smaller machines that allow the quilter to produce a small baby quilt to large machines that can accommodate sizes larger than a king sized quilt. A longarm sewing machine can typically range in cost from $10,000 to $30,000 with additional features of the machine costing more in addition. Machines are usually hand-guided, but computer guided machines are increasing in popularity.

== Longarm quilting services ==
Business owners that have their own longarm quilting machines may choose to quilt other people's quilts for a fee. The price to have a quilt sewn together by a longarm quilter varies depending on the type of quilting requested, the size of the quilt, the expertise of the longarm quilter, competitive pricing in the area of quilting services, and other factors. It is usually calculated by square inch or square foot. Imperial measures are still strong in the quilting world though metric, such as in Australia, is also recognised and publications generally include both.
