= George Wilkinson (music publisher) =

English music publisher and manufacturer (1783-1855)

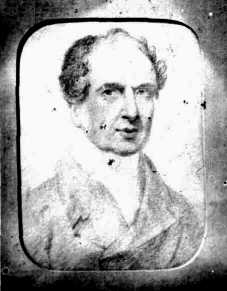
George Wilkinson, by Haughton, 1847

George Wilkinson (5 November 1783 – 1855) was an English music publisher, and piano and candle manufacturer.

== Biography ==
Wilkinson was the youngest son of Charles Wilkinson. In 1797 he apprenticed to London music seller and publisher Francis Broderip, former partner in Longman & Broderip piano manufacturing business which had gone bankrupt in 1795. In 1805 Wilkinson took over his oldest brother Charles' half partnership in the company, which reorganized doing business as Broderip & Wilkinson until Broderip's death in 1807, after which Wilkinson purchased his partner's shares to form Wilkinson & Co. at 3 Great Windmill Street.

By 1808 Wilkinson had arranged for Astor and Leukenfeld to manufacture upright, cabinet pianos licensed from William Southwell's patent (EN 3029, 1807). These instruments (like Petzold & Pfeiffer's harmomelo) were conceived to support the strain of the strings with strong, continuous frames in order to keep better in tune than competing arrangements. Wilkinson & Co. confidently offered a twelve-month guarantee for workmanship and tuning, and consequently they were obliged to furnish better replacements when the pianos were found not to "stand well."

In 1810 Wilkinson sold his publishing stock to Thomas Preston, and borrowed £12,000 from his father to enter in a partnership with his foreman Robert Wornum, who had invented improvements in small upright pianos including diagonal stringing and compact actions (EN 3419, 1811). Wilkinson & Wornum established a factory and showrooms near Hanover Square at 315 Oxford street and 11 Princes street, with a lumber yard in the space between them. The warehouse, factory and stables were destroyed by fire in 1812, putting out as many as 70 workmen, and leaving debts over £16,500 with little relief from insurance. In 1813 the partnership dissolved and the company assigned to Wilkinson's father, who excused the partners' debts and made small guarantees to their other creditors. Wornum established another factory, first at 3 Welbeck Street, and that year introduced a vertically strung harmonic pianoforte better known as the cottage piano.

In late 1813 Wilkinson leased a house at 32 Howland Street, and by 1816 he established a piano factory behind the house, as well as 315 Oxford Street and added showrooms at New Bond Street. This business continued at least through 1830, making at least cabinet upright pianos (praised by Pleyel in 1815) and grand pianos.

Wilkinson entered a partnership with Ferdinand Hirschfeld, and made a specialty manufacturing patented candles with compressed tallow for fuel in order to prevent sputtering and metal wicks to avoid need for snuffing, but these were marketed unsuccessfully. Hirschfeld and Wilkinson, wax chandlers, and oil and spermaceti refiners, at Windsor Terrace, City Road were listed bankrupt 31 July 1835.

In 1854 he left London for Milford Haven avoiding the outbreak of cholera, and died there of a stroke in 1855.

Wilkinson married Elizabeth Cecilia Mary Broadhurst on 23 September 1809. Their children were Ann (1814-1814), Emma (1815–1889), Matilda (1817–1876), Oriana (1818–1853), Louisa (1820-), Alfred Broadhurst Wilkinson (1822–1854), and Henry Broadhurst Wilkinson (1824-). He is buried in Steynton Churchyard.
