= Pantograph =

Mechanical linkage used for copying drawings

Drafting pantograph in use

Pantograph used for scaling a picture. The red shape is traced and enlarged.

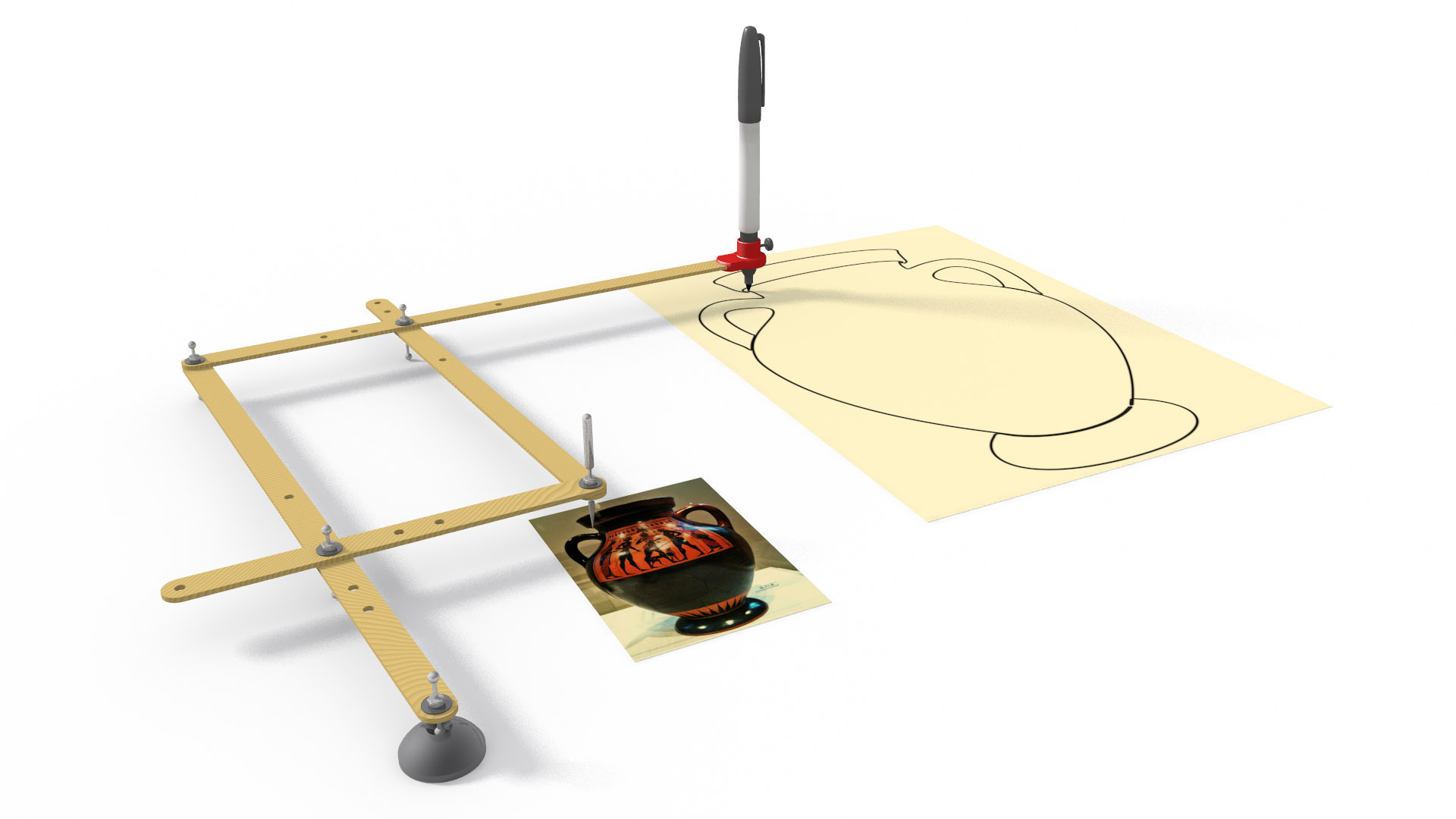
Pantograph 3d rendering

A pantograph (from Greek παντ- 'all, every' and γραφ- 'to write', from its original use for copying writing) is a mechanical linkage connected in a manner based on parallelograms so that the movement of one pen, in tracing an image, produces mimic movements recorded by a second pen. If a line drawing is traced by the first point, an identical, enlarged, or miniaturized copy will be drawn by a pen or stylus fixed to the other. Using the same principle, different kinds of pantographs are used for other forms of duplication in areas such as sculpting, minting, engraving, and milling.

== History ==
The ancient Greek engineer Hero of Alexandria described pantographs in his work Mechanics.

In 1603, Christoph Scheiner used a pantograph to copy and scale diagrams, and wrote about the invention over 27 years later, in "Pantographice seu Ars delineandi res quaslibet per parallelogrammum lineare seu cavum" (Rome 1631). One arm of the pantograph contained a small pointer, while the other held a drawing implement, and by moving the pointer over a diagram, a copy of the diagram was drawn on another piece of paper. By changing the positions of the arms in the linkage between the pointer arm and drawing arm, the scale of the image produced can be changed.

Diagram illustrating the principles used by William Wallace's eidograph

In 1821, Professor William Wallace (1768–1843) invented the eidograph to improve upon the practical utility of the pantograph. The eidograph relocates the fixed point to the center of the parallelogram and uses a narrow parallelogram to provide improved mechanical advantages.

== Uses ==
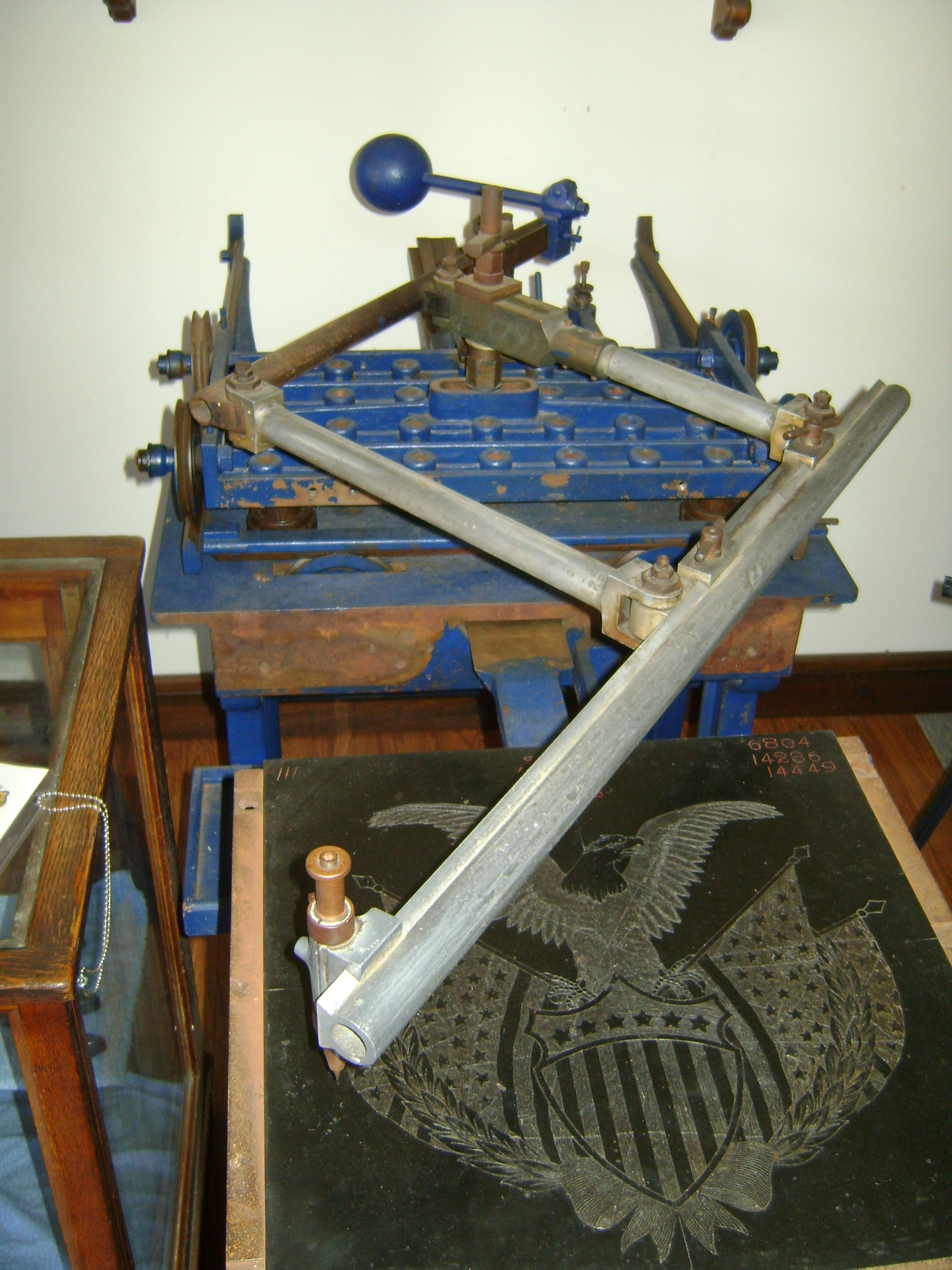
Pantograph etching mechanism

Francis Galton's pantograph

=== Drafting ===
The original use of the pantograph was for copying and scaling line drawings. Modern versions are sold as technical toys.

=== Sculpture and minting ===
Sculptors use a three-dimensional version of the pantograph, usually a large boom connected to a fixed point at one end, bearing two rotating pointing needles at arbitrary points along this boom. By adjusting the needles different enlargement or reduction ratios can be achieved. This device was invented by inventor and steam pioneer James Watt and perfected by Benjamin Cheverton in 1836. Cheverton's machine was fitted with a rotating cutting bit to carve reduced versions of well-known sculptures. Though now, it is largely overtaken by computer guided router systems that scan a model and can produce it in a variety of materials and in any desired size, A three-dimensional pantograph can also be used to enlarge sculpture by interchanging the position of the model and the copy.

Another version is still very much in use to reduce the size of large relief designs for coins down to the required size of the coin.

=== Acoustic cylinder duplication ===
One advantage of phonograph and gramophone discs over cylinders in the 1890s—before electronic amplification was available—was that large numbers of discs could be stamped quickly and cheaply. In 1890, the only ways of manufacturing copies of a master cylinder were to mold the cylinders (which was slow and, early on, produced very poor copies), or to acoustically copy the sound by placing the horns of two phonographs together or to hook the two together with a rubber tube (one phonograph recording and the other playing the cylinder back). Instead of copying a master cylinder, the other alternative was to record a performance to multiple gramophones simultaneously, over and over again, making each cylinder a master copy. Edison, Bettini, Leon Douglass and others solved this problem (partly) by mechanically linking a cutting stylus and a playback needle together and copying the "hill-and-dale" grooves of the cylinder mechanically. When molding improved somewhat, molded cylinders were used as pantograph masters. This was employed by Edison and Columbia in 1898, and was used until about January 1902 (Columbia brown waxes after this were molded). Some companies like the United States Phonograph Company of Newark, New Jersey, supplied cylinder masters for smaller companies so that they could duplicate them, sometimes pantographically. Pantographs could turn out about 30 records per day and produce up to about 150 records per master. In theory, pantograph masters could be used for 200 or 300 duplicates if the master and the duplicate were running in reverse and the record would be duplicated in reverse. This, in theory, could extend the usability of a pantograph master by using the unworn/lesser worn part of the recording for duplication. Pathé employed this system with mastering their vertically cut records until 1923; a 5-inch-diameter (130 mm), 4-or-6-inch-long (100 or 150 mm) master cylinder, rotating at a high speed, would be recorded on. This was done as the resulting cylinder was considerably loud and of very high fidelity. Then, the cylinder would be placed on the mandrel of a duplicating pantograph that would be played with a needle on the end of a lever, which would transfer the sound to a wax disc master, which would be electroplated and be used to stamp copies out. This system resulted in some fidelity reduction and rumble, but relatively high quality sound. Edison Diamond Disc Records were made by recording directly onto the wax master disc.

=== Milling machines ===
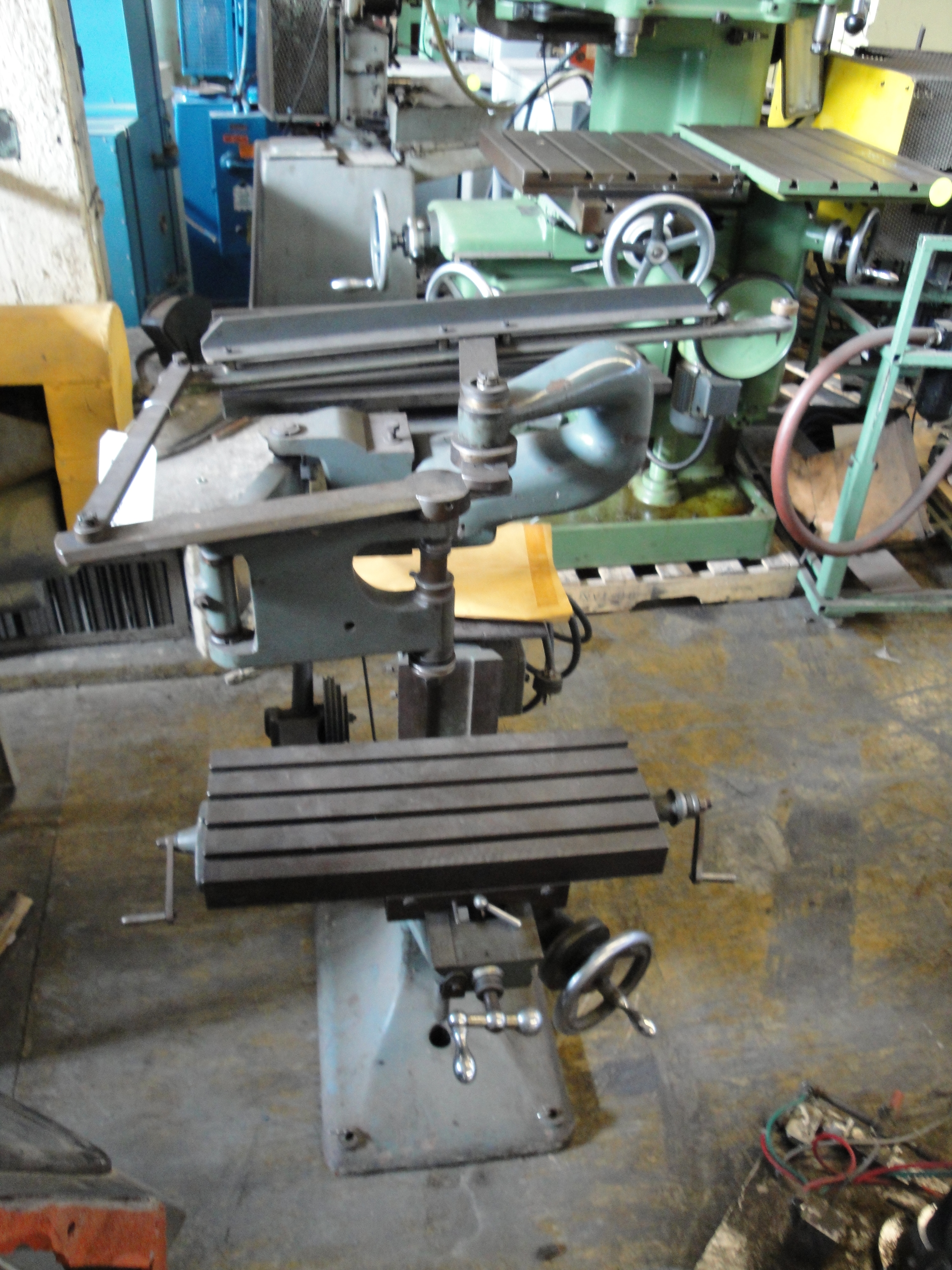
A small pantograph milling machine

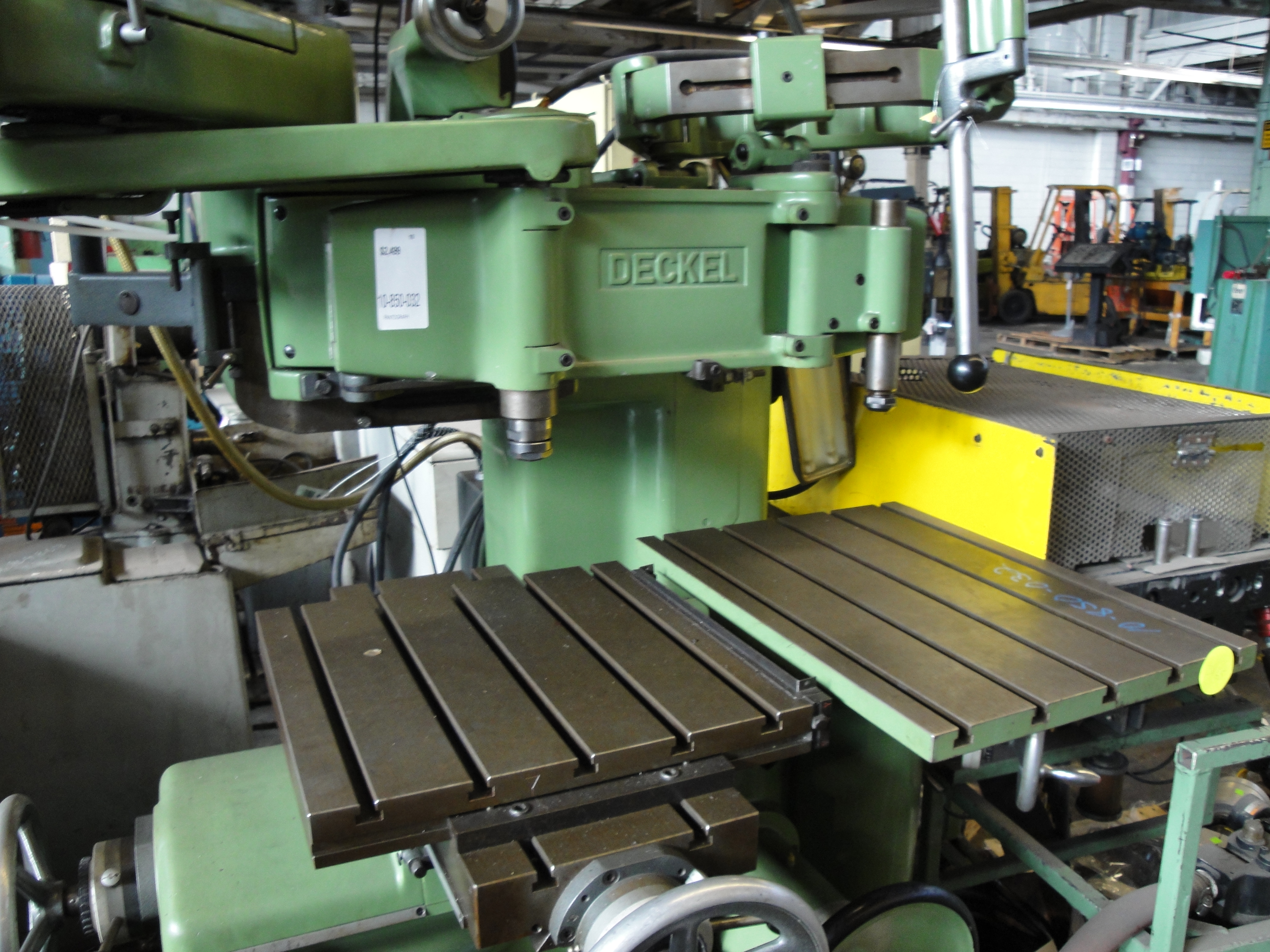
Detail of the table of a larger pantograph milling machine

Before the advent of control technologies such as numerical control (NC and CNC) and programmable logic control (PLC), duplicate parts being milled on a milling machine could not have their contours mapped out by moving the milling cutter in a "connect-the-dots" ("by-the-numbers") fashion. The only ways to control the movement of the cutting tool were to dial the positions by hand using dexterous skill (with natural limits on a human's accuracy and precision) or to trace a cam, template, or model in some way, and have the cutter mimic the movement of the tracing stylus. If the milling head was mounted on a pantograph, a duplicate part could be cut (and at various scales of magnification besides 1:1) simply by tracing a template. (The template itself was usually made by a tool and die maker using toolroom methods, including milling via dialing followed by hand sculpting with files and/or die grinder points.) This was essentially the same concept as reproducing documents with a pen-equipped pantograph, but applied to the machining of hard materials such as metal, wood, or plastic. Pantograph routing, which is conceptually identical to pantograph milling, also exists (as does CNC routing). The Blanchard lathe, a copying lathe developed by Thomas Blanchard, used the same essential concept.

The development and dissemination throughout industry of NC, CNC, PLC, and other control technologies provided a new way to control the movement of the milling cutter: via feeding information from a program to actuators (servos, selsyns, leadscrews, machine slides, spindles, and so on) that would move the cutter as the information directed. Today most commercial machining is done via such programmable, computerized methods. Home machinists are likely to work via manual control, but computerized control has reached the home-shop level as well (it is just not yet as pervasive as its commercial counterparts). Thus pantograph milling machines are largely a thing of the past. They are still in commercial use, but at a greatly reduced and ever-dwindling level. They are no longer built new by machine tool builders, but a small market for used machines still exists. As for the magnification-and-reduction feature of a pantograph (with the scale determined by the adjustable arm lengths), it is achieved in CNC via mathematic calculations that the computer applies to the program information practically instantaneously. Scaling functions (as well as mirroring functions) are built into languages such as G-code.

=== Other uses ===
In another application similar to drafting, the pantograph is incorporated into a pantograph engraving machine with a revolving cutter instead of a pen, and a tray at the pointer end to fix precut lettered plates (referred to as 'copy'), which the pointer follows and thus the cutter, via the pantograph, reproduces the 'copy' at a ratio to which the pantograph arms have been set. The typical range of ratio is Maximum 1:1 Minimum 50:1 (reduction) In this way machinists can neatly and accurately engrave numbers and letters onto a part. Pantographs are no longer commonly used in modern engraving, with computerized laser and rotary engraving taking favor.

Herman Hollerith's "Keyboard punch" used for the 1890 U.S. Census was a pantograph design and sometimes referred to as "The Pantograph Punch".

An early 19th-century device employing this mechanism is the polygraph, which produces a duplicate of a letter as the original is written.

In 1886, Eduard Selling patented a prize-winning calculating machine based on the pantograph, although it was not commercially successful.

Longarm quilting machine operators may trace a pantograph, paper pattern, with a laser pointer to stitch a custom pattern onto the quilt. Digitized pantographs are followed by computerized machines.

Linn Boyd Benton invented a pantographic engraving machine for type design, which was capable not only of scaling a single font design pattern to a variety of sizes, but could also condense, extend, and slant the design (mathematically, these are cases of affine transformation, which is the fundamental geometric operation of most systems of digital typography today, including PostScript).

Richard Feynman used the analogy of a pantograph as a way of scaling down tools to the nanometer scale in his talk "There's Plenty of Room at the Bottom".

== See also ==
- Autopen – Device for automatically signing a signature or autograph
- Lettering guide – Template for writing text
- Parallel motion linkage – Six-bar straight-line mechanism
- Spirograph – Geometric drawing device
- List of duplicating processes
