= John Isaac Hawkins =

Civil engineer and inventor (1772–1855)

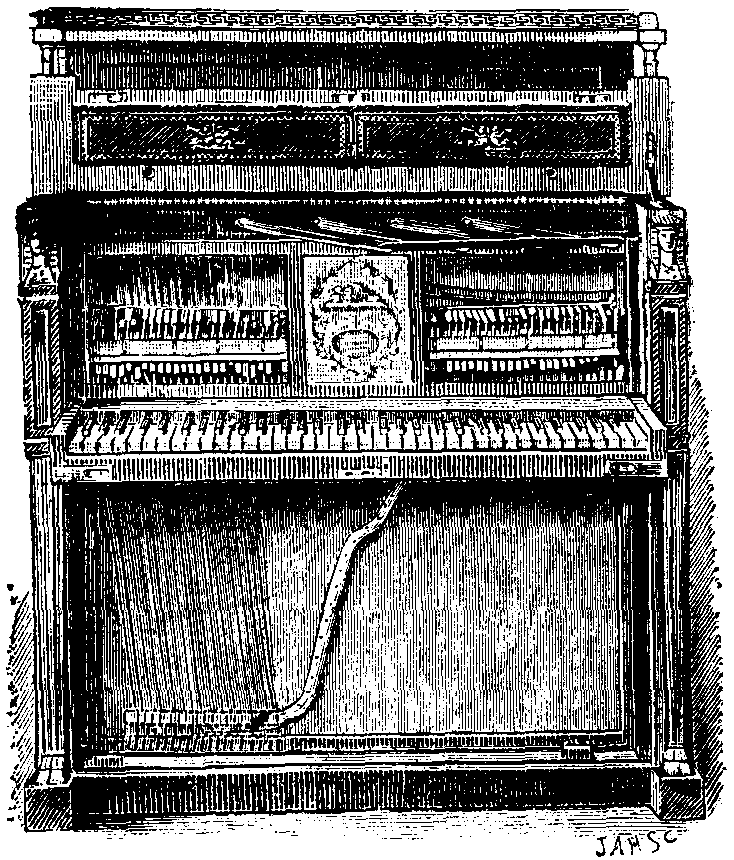
Hawkins portable grand piano of 1800

John Isaac Hawkins (1772–1855) was a British-American inventor and civil engineer who twice emigrated to and ultimately died in the American state of New Jersey.

== Early life ==
Hawkins was born on March 14, 1772 at Taunton, Somerset, England, the son of Joan Wilmington and her husband Isaac Hawkins, a watchmaker. The father, Isaac Hawkins, would become a Wesleyan minister, but was expelled by John Wesley; and after moving the family to Moorfields in London he was a minister in the Swedenborgian movement, which John Isaac would also follow.

== First emigration to America ==
John Isaac emigrated to the United States about 1790, attending the College of New Jersey, where he studied medicine and later, chemical filtration.

Hawkins married in New Jersey and lived at Bordentown and Philadelphia. In his own account, he was influenced by work of Georg Moritz Lowitz to try charcoal for filtration purposes, and ran an exhibition on the topic, with Raphaelle and Rembrandt Peale, in the Philadelphia Exchange Coffee House. He operated a non-vocational craft school in Bristol, Pennsylvania from about 1800; and he collaborated on inventions with Rev. Burgess Allison.

== In London ==
Hawkins returned to England in 1803, and opened a London sugar refinery. He also worked as a patent agent and consultant at this period. He set up a museum of "useful mechanical inventions", featuring a number of his own, as reported in the Monthly Magazine in 1808. He also continued inventing and performed "experiments of a delightfully awful character". As a Swedenborgian, he associated with Manoah Sibly, becoming secretary of the "London Conference" in 1814 when Sibly was president. He took an interest in phrenology from 1815, for the rest of his life. Hawkins and his wife adopted from the workhouse a child, James Chalmers, orphaned after his parents had entered the Poyais scam of Gregor MacGregor; he died young.

Hawkins joined the Institution of Civil Engineers in 1824. In 1825, he went to Vienna to superintend the construction of a beet sugar works there, and subsequently did the same in Paris. Back in London, where his wife Anna died in 1838, he superintended the construction of the Thames Tunnel under Isambard Kingdom Brunel. Hawkins also served as president of the Anthropological Society of London, a phrenological group.

== Reemigration to America ==
Later in life Hawkins fell into debt and concluding that America presented a better opportunity to profit from his patents, he decided to reemigrate, departing in autumn 1848. Returning to New Jersey, "as a gray old man" he lived with his third wife "who was barely out of her teens". Lectures there for local ladies could not survive their disapproval of his display of human skulls or the preserved organs of his deceased adopted son, his only child, whom he had dissected following the boy's death at age seven. He published the Journal of Human Nature and Human Progress, but this was short-lived, and he died in poverty and relative obscurity at Rahway or Elizabethtown, New Jersey, 28 June 1855.

== Pianino ==
Hawkins was the first to see the importance of using iron in pianoforte framing. He was living in Philadelphia when he invented and first produced the pianino or cottage pianoforte – the "portable grand" as he then called it – which he patented in 1800. Thomas Jefferson bought one, of 5½ octaves, for $264.

There had been upright grand pianos as well as upright harpsichords, the horizontal instrument being turned up on its wider end and a keyboard and action adapted to it. William Southwell, an Irish pianomaker, had in 1798 tried a similar experiment with a square piano, to be repeated in later years by William Frederick Collard of London; but Hawkins was the first to make a piano, or pianino, with the strings descending to the floor, the keyboard being raised. His instrument was in a complete iron frame, independent of the case; and in this frame, strengthened by a system of iron resistance rods combined with an iron upper bridge, his sound-board was entirely suspended. An apparatus for tuning by mechanical screws regulated the tension of the strings, which were of equal length throughout. The action, in metal supports, anticipated Robert Wornum's in the checking, and later ideas in a contrivance for repetition. This bundle of inventions was brought to London and exhibited by Hawkins himself; but the instrument was poor in tone.

== Other inventions, proposals and works ==
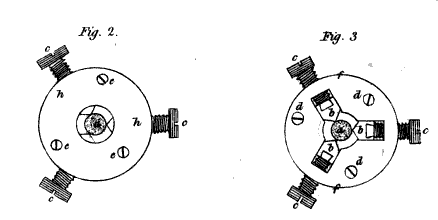
Improved lathe chuck, drawing from an 1808 article by Hawkins

- Patented (1802) an improved physiognotrace, a device by which one could quickly produce a silhouette portrait (i.e. a paper cut-out profile).
- Invented and obtained a patent in 1803 for the polygraph, a mechanism for producing a duplicate copy while a handwritten original was created. This is credited with being the first autopen. Charles Willson Peale made the first, and sold it to Benjamin Henry Latrobe. Latrobe then showed it to Thomas Jefferson, who took an interest in the invention.
- Experimented with machines for reproducing sculptures (1804). Later Benjamin Cheverton took up the idea, making a reducing machine for sculptures (1828), and exhibiting it at the Great Exhibition of 1851. It was a type of engine lathe, explained by Hawkins in the British Association meeting, Section G, in 1837.
- For water filtration (1808)
- Experiments in 1810–11 for a brick pedestrian tunnel under the Thames, with Charles Wyatt, proposal to the Thames Archway Company
- The mechanical pencil (1822); the rights were sold to Sampson Mordan and Gabriel Riddle.
- Trifocal corrective eyeglass lenses, patented in 1827, also coining the name "bifocal" for the dual focal length lenses invented by Benjamin Franklin
- Sugar refining, by the method of Edward Charles Howard for whom he had worked.
- The iridium-tipped gold pen (1834). Platinum-nib pens with iridium tips sold at a guinea.
- Translated A Treatize on the Teeth of Wheels from the French of Charles Étienne Louis Camus, and advocated involute profile for gears (by 1840)
- Perfected Perkins' steam gun, intended to eliminate warfare by making resistance impossible.
