= Benjamin Cheverton =

British sculptor

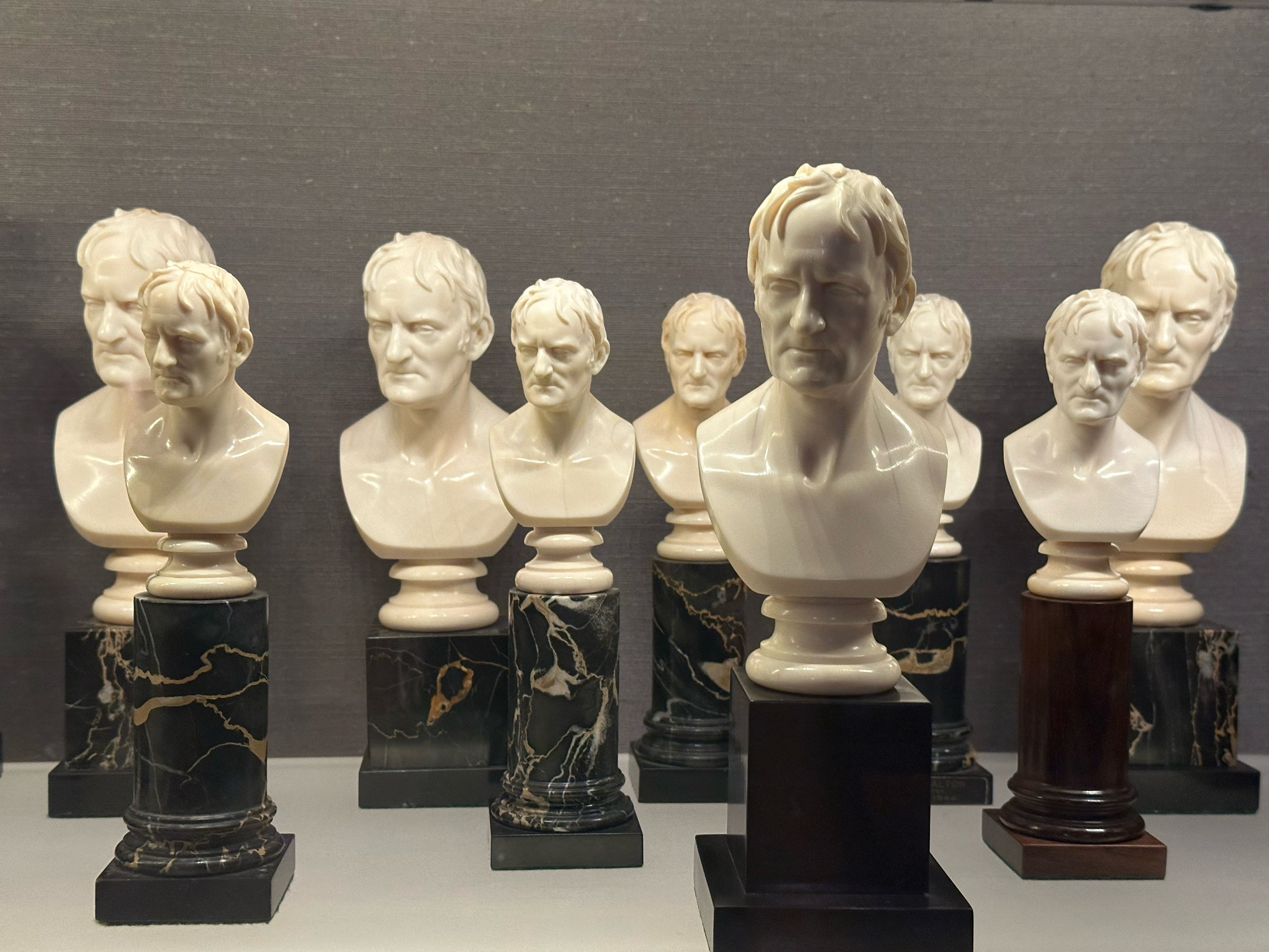
Several miniature reproductions of a bust of John Dalton by Francis Leggatt Chantrey, at the Art Gallery of Ontario

Benjamin Cheverton (1796 – 1876) was an English sculptor and inventor. With the assistance of John Isaac Hawkins, he designed and operated a novel pantograph machine to create detailed miniature reproductions of sculptures, primarily busts of historical and mythological figures by contemporary sculptors like Francis Leggatt Chantrey, Louis-François Roubiliac, and Joseph Durham. His reproducing machine, which was exhibited at the Great Exhibition of 1851, is now in the collection of the Science Museum, London. A large collection of his work is found in the Thomson Collection at the Art Gallery of Ontario.

He died in February 1876 and was buried on the western side of Highgate Cemetery.
