= Robert Wornum =

Robert Wornum (1780 - 1852). The lyre guitar (c.1810) in the portrait is part of the Steve Howe Guitar Collection.

Robert Wornum (1780–1852) was a piano maker working in London during the first half of the 19th century. He is best known for introducing small cottage and oblique uprights and an action considered to be the predecessor of the modern upright action which was used in Europe through the early 20th century. His piano manufacturing business eventually became Robert Wornum & Sons and continued half a century after his death.

Art historian Ralph Nicholson Wornum (1812–1877) was his son.

== Early life and career ==
Robert Wornum was born on 1 October 1780, son of music seller and violin maker Robert Wornum (1742–1815), who worked at Glasshouse Street, London, and after about 1777, at 42 Wigmore Street, near Cavendish Square. Piano historian Alfred J. Hipkins wrote the younger Wornum was originally intended for the church, but by 1810 had the position of foreman at music sellers Wilkinson & Company at 3 Great Windmill Street and 13 Haymarket.

Wilkinson & Co. were successors to Broderip & Wilkinson, a partnership between Francis Broderip and George Wilkinson which had formed in 1798 following the failure of Longman & Broderip. Wilkinson & Co. was organized following Broderip's death in 1807. According to the family history recorded by Wilkinson's son Henry Broadhurst Wilkinson, the firm had arranged to have tall cabinet upright pianos manufactured for them by Astor and "Leukenfeld" by license under William Southwell's patent. Southwell, who was said to have made the first cabinet upright in 1790, described that it was "so constructed as to prevent the possibility of its being so frequently out of tune", and without "any opening or perforation between the sound-board and the pin block", although his 1807 patent only claimed a new arrangement of its dampers. The Monthly Magazine reported in May, 1808 that Wilkinson & Co. offered to the public "a New Patent, Cabinet Piano-forte", and described that its form was "as curious as convenient," occupying no more room than the smallest bookcase, while its tone was both brilliant and delicate, its touch "peculiarly facile and pleasant" and claimed the strength and simplicity of its construction would tend "to ensure its keeping in tune longer than most other instruments." The Quarterly Musical Register described in early 1812 that by then these instruments were manufactured by other firms as well, and commented "whether they will be adopted as preferable to the square piano forte, time must shew." Wornum's son Alfred later claimed that these instruments were unsuccessful for a time and Broadhurst Wilkinson related that the firm had been obliged to furnish replacements under warrantee when the instruments sold by them were found not to "stand well." By mid-1809, however, the firm advertised that owing to "the great increase of their manufactory of pianos" they had determined to close down their other musical enterprises, and had reduced their entire stock of music to half price and offered favorable terms on all instruments out on hire.

== Wilkinson & Wornum and the Unique upright ==
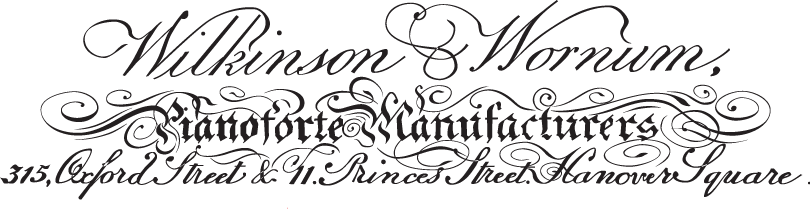
ca. 1811

Wornum's Unique action, 1811 patent

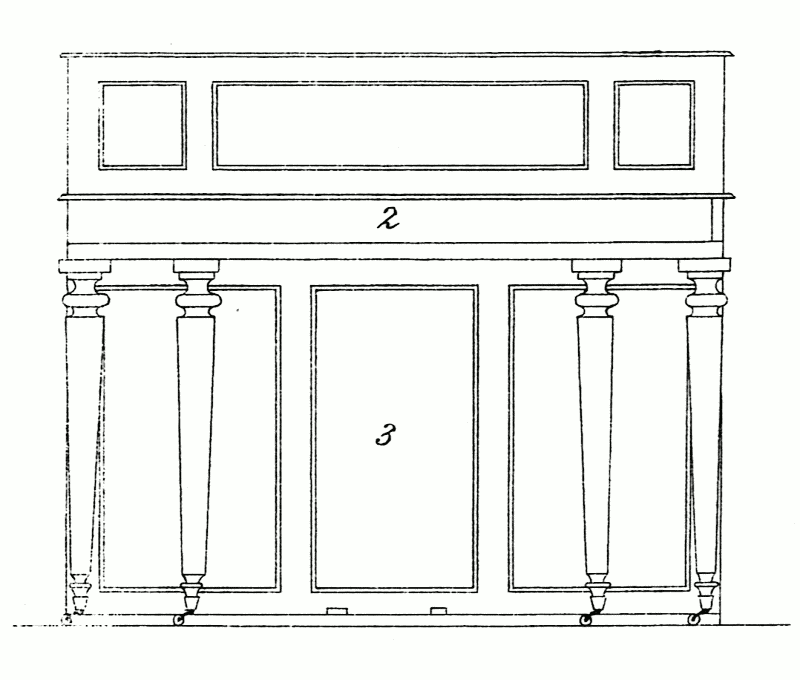
Wornum's Unique piano, 1811 patent

In 1810, according to Broadhurst Wilkinson, Wilkinson borrowed £12,000 ($53,000) to form a partnership with Wornum, and leased houses at 315 Oxford street and Princes street, adjoining Hanover Square, for warerooms, factory and residences, with the yard behind 11 Princes street used for seasoning lumber.

In 1811 Wornum patented a small bichord upright standing about three feet three inches tall (99 cm) styled the "unique". Its strings were stretched diagonally from the top to the right side of the case and communicated with a small sounding board, and the case itself was divided in half with separate parts containing the action and keyboard, and strings and frame. Wornum's escapement worked directly upon a padded notch on the hammer butt and in this way could omit the intermediate lever used in many square pianos and Southwell's cabinet uprights, and the hammer was returned to its resting position by a spring fixed to the hammer rail instead of by its own weight or that of the sticker. Like Southwell, Wornum used overdampers that pressed against the strings above the hammers and were mounted on levers hinged from a separate rail, but the wires that raised them were to be acted upon by the backward oriented base of the escapement instead of by the sticker or the hammer. Wornum also claimed a buff stop, operated by the left pedal which muted one of the strings of each note. Two articles published in 1851 indicate that the firm built several hundred of these pianos.

One of the firm's cabinet uprights was illustrated in the February 1812 issue of The Repository of Arts under the heading "Fashionable Furniture", with the explanation that these had become a much requested item due to their improvements which "procured this instrument a very high degree of reputation". The brief note described that they ranged from six feet to seven feet two inches high (183 to 218 cm) and were available in mahogany as well as rosewood with brass, and praised their "unrivalled" touch and the suitability of their tone—particularly of the instruments with two strings per note—for accompanying voice.

Wilkinson & Wornum's Oxford street facilities were destroyed by fire in October 1812. The proprietors quickly announced that the greater part of their finished stock had been saved, in part by their neighbors and other volunteers, and was ready for sale at 11 Princes street only a few days afterwards, but a collection was started for their upwards of seventy workmen who had lost all of their tools and were unable to return to work. At a meeting of the firm's creditors in November, Wilkinson's father, Charles Wilkinson, agreed not to make a claim against them and guaranteed payment to the other creditors, and in early 1813 he forgave what the partners owed him. Wilkinson & Wornum was dissolved on 3 March 1813. Wilkinson established his own piano factory behind his new house at 32 Howland street, and Wornum, possibly having sold his patent to music seller John Watlen, of Leicester place, removed to 42 Wigmore street.

At some point in the partnership, pianos appear to have been supplied by Muir, Wood & Co. of Edinburgh, labelled "Wilkinson & Wornam" [sic]. Could this have been to supplement W&W's production, or perhaps maintain sales after the fire?

Oxford and Princes street, ca. 1792

Wigmore and Welbeck street ca. 1792

== Harmonic uprights and equal tension ==
ca. 1815

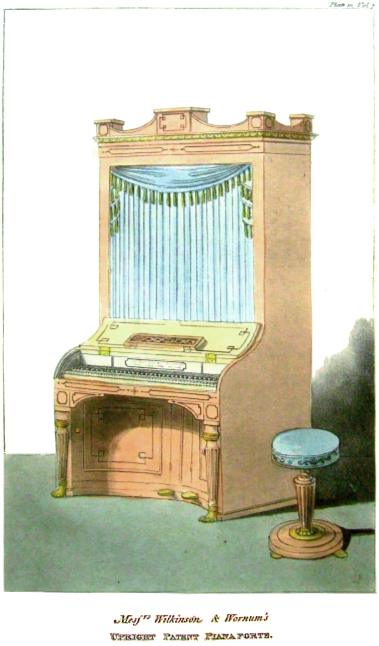
Wilkinson & Wornum upright, 1812

By 1813 Wornum introduced a second upright design with vertical strings, measuring about four feet six inches tall (137 cm), that he called the "harmonic" which is generally considered the first successful cottage upright. Low vertically strung uprights with similar construction had been introduced with patented features in 1800 by Matthias Mueller in Vienna and John Isaac Hawkins in Philadelphia and London. Hawkins' in particular contained a similar action to the one shown in Wornum's 1809 patent, and the highest three octaves were strung with one size wire under the same tension in the same fashion as Wornum's 1820 patent, but both of these instruments also were more unusual than the cottage upright in tone and construction. Mueller's piano was described in the 1810 Oekonomische Encyklopädie as having a tone similar to a basset horn, and he offered a tandem model for performing duets he called the Ditanaklasis while Hawkins' piano featured a complete iron frame with an open back, a large, independent sounding board, and bass strings in the form of coil springs and it included mechanical tuners, a retractable keyboard, and a metallic upper bridge. Hipkins account of Hawkins' instrument in the 1890 Encyclopædia Britannica described that it was "poor in the tone."

In 1820 Wornum patented a system of equal tension for pianos (and "certain other stringed instruments") that he specified would be achieved by employing "one size steel wire throughout", and in the shortened wrapped bass strings also by adjusting the size of the windings. According to the report of the patent in The Quarterly Musical Magazine it was intended to prevent the falling of the middle and upper octaves which the article described were the result of the usual practice of employing different tensions and sizes of wire in different parts of the piano, and the author reported that by his method Wornum was able to produce tones that were "firm, sonorous, and brilliant, and their standing warranted the highest opinion of the principle"; the review in The London Journal of Arts and Sciences predicted, however, that "if it [could] ever be brought into use" it would "give a bad tone to the upper part of the instrument", and among the objections the reviewer anticipated, he claimed that it would be difficult to determining string lengths using Wornum's method, as well as in "procuring wires all of one size".

Alfred Savage, who wrote several letters on piano construction published in the Mechanics' Magazine in the early 1840s, stated that this system had the advantage of standing in tune better than any other, but that its tone was unequal across the compass: he described that using a thicker size wire would result in a want of vibration in the treble, whereas a thinner wire would want of firmness and fulness in the bass, and attributed the difference to the stiffness of the wire in relation to the length of the strings. Another correspondent on pianos who signed as "The Harmonious Blacksmith" wrote in an 1871 letter to the English Mechanic and World of Science that his "late friend" Wornum had used no.15 wire throughout, which in the 1820s and 1830s was at least four sizes larger than the wire normally used for the highest notes and several sizes larger even than those in the much longer and higher tensioned scales used at the time of the article, and he described that it gave "a very good treble, but a very poor tenor and bass." Wornum used this scale at least for the full term of the patent but it never came into more general application.

== Double actions and Piccolo uprights ==
Wornum's second double action, 1826 patent

Wornum's double or Piccolo action, ca. 1829

In 1826 Wornum patented improvements to what he called in the specification the professional piano, claiming a pizzicato pedal positioned between the two ordinary pedals and operating linkages arranged to press the dampers against the strings, a pinned single action where the damper lever was raised by a button at the end of a wire attached to an extension on the sticker and two double actions with additional levers mounted to a second rail for operating the dampers as well as checks for the hammer. The first of these was arranged like the action from his 1811 patent with the backward facing escapement on the key operating the check lever wire; in the second the check lever wire was operated by the sticker. The sticker was pinned to the underside of another lever, hinged to the hammer rail and carrying the escapement. The escapement worked on the principle of the English grand action with the regulating button fixed to the hammer rail, but with its spring mounted on the sticker instead of the lower part of the escapement. A fixed hammer return spring was not shown, and apparently in its place a spring was mounted on the hopper and worked against the hammer butt to prevent the hammer "from dancing after the hand is off the key".

Two years later Wornum patented an improvement to the sticker action with a button mounted at the end of the key made to check against an extension of the back end of the lower lever of the sticker in order to prevent unwanted movement of the hammers after each blow against the strings.

François-Joseph Fétis wrote in 1851 that he had played upon two of Wornum's uprights in 1829 and found they had significant, though unspecified, advantages over those of other manufacturers.

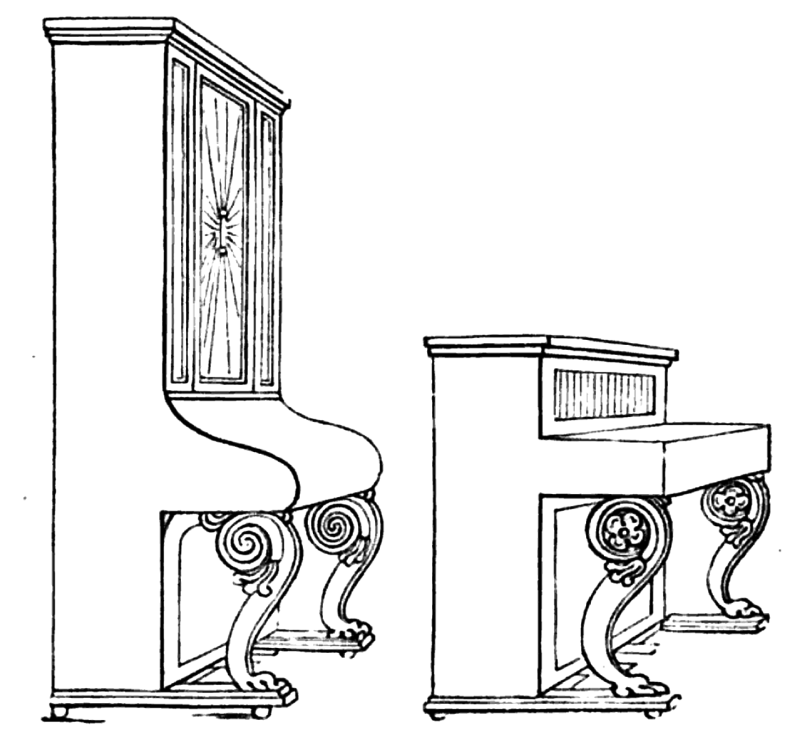
Wornum's largest and smallest uprights, ca. 1839

According to Hipkins Wornum had perfected the crank, or "tied" double action during this year, and introduced it in his cabinet and three feet eight inch tall (112 cm), piccolo uprights by 1830. In this action a flexible tie fastened to the hammer butt and to a wire mounted on the crank lever has the same function as the dog spring from the 1826 double action. The crank lever also operated a check working against an extension of the hammer butt and raised the damper wire. This arrangement has come to be known as the tape check action, the name which is also applied to the modern upright action which differs in the form of the jack and the position and operation of the damper lever. Hipkins claimed that the "facile touch gained by the new mechanism soon attracted the musical public" but it was not put in widespread use in Britain even after the 1826 patent expired; he wrote in about 1880 that its durability had made it "a favourite model of action for the manufacturers of the present day both here and abroad," and predicted that it would eventually replace the sticker action in England, having already been generally adopted in France and Germany.

This action was illustrated as "Wornum's double or piccolo action" in the article "Pianoforte" in the 1840 Penny Cyclopaedia (which listed "R. Wornum" as contributor for the articles on the piano and the organ) where it was described as "the invention of Mr. Wornum, and patented by him some ten or twelve years ago". A similar claim was stated on the regulating instructions pasted to double actions in Wornum's piccolo, harmonic and cabinet pianos.

This is not the only published account concerning the origin of this action, and in particular that of the flexible tie or bridle tape, as it is known today. Harding stated explicitly in The Pianoforte that Wornum "neither invented or patented" the tape and credited the invention to piano manufacturer Herman Lichtenthal of Brussels (and later Saint Petersburg), who received a patent for improvement in 1832 that shows an action which differs from the 1840 illustration primarily in the form and position of the damper lever and its mechanism. In 1836 French piano tuner, and later manufacturer, Claude Montal described in L'art d'accorder soi-même son piano that Camille Pleyel had introduced improvements to the design of Wornum's small uprights when he introduced the pianino in France in 1830, but although Montal describes the action and flexible tie in detail he did not specify whether they were among the changes. Both of these examples can also be distinguished for employing leather for the flexible tie rather than woven tape, which Harding tentatively credited to Wornum. Hipkins related that it was due to Pleyel's commercial success that the double action came to be called the "French action" in England.

The action has also become associated with the patent granted to Wornum in 1842, though often dated as having been introduced by him five years earlier, apparently in reference to its description as the "tape check action" in the annotated list of English patents applicable to pianos in piano manufacturer and historian Edgar Brinsmead's 1879 edition of History of the Pianoforte. In the 1870 edition this had been called more accurately the "tape action"

== Double action grands and downstriking actions ==
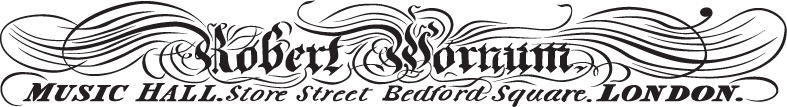
ca.1845

16 Store street, from 1875 Ordnance Survey map

In 1830 Wornum leased buildings at 15 and 17 Store street, Bedford Square, for a new factory. By 1832 he opened a music hall adjoining the factory at number 16, "built expressly for Morning and Evening Concerts," with a capacity of between 800 and 1000.

According to Loudon's Encyclopædia of Cottage, Farm, and Villa Architecture and Furniture Wornum exhibited a piano in 1833 "that could hardly be distinguished from a library table" and by 1838 he offered patent double action piccolo uprights from 30 to 50 guineas, and cottage and cabinet uprights from 42 to 75 guineas ($350), which the encyclopedia described were handsomely finished in the back and had "the same degree of tone and excellence...as the horizontal pianos"—the smallest and largest models being those "most frequently used"— as well as 5 foot 4 inch long (163 cm) pocket and 7 foot 10 inch (237 cm) imperial grands for up to 75 and 90 guineas ($420) respectively. He advertised that these reduced prices were in response to the success of his piccolo piano which had "induced certain manufacturers to announce and sell instruments of a different character under the same name, by which the public [was] deceived", but by the following year offered more expensive versions of the larger models. The new 6-octave pocket and 6½ octave imperial grands followed the ordinary practice of positioning the strings above the hammers but were constructed with an entirely separate structure hinged at the spine from the lower part of the case so that the wrestplank, wood frame, sounding board and bridges were all placed above the strings, forming a rigid uninterrupted construction similar to his uprights as well as what he would later use in downstriking pianos. These grands were furnished with tied double actions arranged like those of the uprights.

By 1840 Wornum had improved his grand actions by adding a sustaining spring tying the hammer butt and the short end of the crank lever, intended to improve repetition and "assist in the forte," but eventually abandoned the inverted construction due to its inconvenient form and turned his attention instead to manufacturing "overstruck" or downstriking horizontal pianos, where the hammers are located above the strings. In 1842 he patented the application of mobile hammer return springs to downstriking actions for grands and squares, and included claims for a new disposition of the crank lever and escapement, as well as a method of operating the damper in uprights with a leather strip attached either to the hammer butt or to a wire fixed in the key.

Wornum's new Grand Action, ca. 1840

Downstriking double action, 1842 patent

Upright actions, 1842 patent

== Robert Wornum & Sons ==
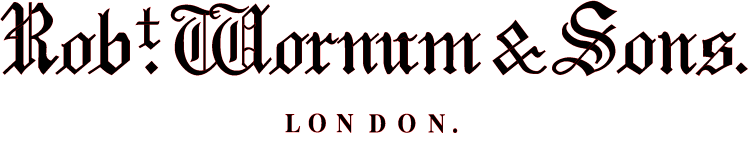
ca.1860

At the 1851 London Exhibition Robert Wornum & Sons exhibited cottage uprights, and downstriking bichord semi-grand and square pianos. Their Albion semi-grand was noted as a good example of how the downstriking action allowed for a simpler and more economical construction without metallic bracing, and they were awarded a prize medal for their improved piccolo piano—placing them after Erard, of Paris and London, who won the council medal for pianos, and at the same level as twenty-two other piano manufacturers, including Broadwood & Sons of London, Schiedmayer & Söhne, Stuttgart, Pape, Paris, and Jonas Chickering, Boston.

Robert Wornum died on 29 September 1852 after a short illness. He was succeeded by his son Alfred Nicholson Wornum.

The firm exhibited at the 1855 Exposition Universelle but failed to win an award.

In 1856 A. N. Wornum patented improvements to downstriking actions with a spring to keep the crank lever in constant contact with the key, as well as a new arrangement for the regulating button to allow easier adjustment and a method for improving repetition with a spring, and in 1862 patented further improvements with the aim of rendering the action very compact by moving the dampers below the hammers and operating them by projections attached at the far ends of the escapement levers. He also claimed a pivoting stand for square pianos in order for them to swing up and out of the way when not in use.

Robert Wornum & Sons exhibited cottage and grand pianos as well as their "folding" square at the 1862 International Exhibition in London, receiving a medal for "novelty of invention in piano"—one of almost seventy piano manufacturers to receive a prize medal including Broadwood, L. Boesendorfer of Vienna, Pleyel, Wolff & Cie, Paris, and Steinway & Sons, New York. They exhibited a piccolo upright, as well as moderately priced downstriking grand and square pianos without metal bracings at the 1867 Universal Exposition in Paris, where they were awarded a bronze medal, at the same level as J. Brinsmead of London, J. Promberger, Vienna, and Hornung & Moeller, Copenhagen, among others, but below the level of most of the manufacturers judged to be their equals in previous exhibitions.

Advertisement and cash prices for Robert Wornum & Sons, piano manufacturers

In 1866 A. N. Wornum patented methods of extending sounding boards beyond the wrestplank bridge in uprights and downstriking grands, which he claimed would improve their higher notes, and patented improvements in grands in 1870. Earlier that year Robert Wornum & Sons had advertised that their "new patent construction" allowed a reduction of over 100 guineas in the price of their grand pianos, as well as insuring "a full, sweet tone and an elastic touch", and by 1871 the firm offered four sizes between 5 feet 6 inches (168 cm) and 8 feet 6 inches (259 cm) on the new plan, priced between 56 and 96 guineas ($260 to $450). A reporter for the Journal of the Society of Arts on the Second Annual International Exhibition held in London in 1872, however, described the tone of the wooden frame pianos the firm displayed as "sweet, but hardly full or forcible enough."

A. N. Wornum patented further improvements in grands in 1875, introducing hammers with reversed orientation in order to permit longer strings relative to the size of the piano, and the firm displayed short ("under six foot") and full size ("8 feet") "Iron Grand Pianofortes" on this plan, along with a piccolo upright at the 1878 Universal Exposition in Paris, for which they were awarded a silver medal. This placed them again at the same level as Brinsmead (though this firm's founder was awarded the medal of the Legion of Honor on the same occasion), as well as Kriegelstein, Paris and Charles Stieff, Baltimore.

Hipkins wrote in the article on Wornum in the 1889 volume of the Dictionary of Music and Musicians that "[t]he present head of the firm of Robert Wornum & Sons is Mr. A. N. Wornum, who has succeeded to his grandfather's inventive talent."

According to Frank Kidson the firm was "still an important one in the pianoforte trade" in early 1900, but Harding lists this year as their last entry in the London directories as piano manufacturers.
