= Guillaume-Lebrecht Petzold =

Guillaume-Lebrecht Petzold (2 July 1794 – ) was a piano maker in Paris in the early 19th century.

Petzold was born in Lichtenhain, a village in Saxony. His father, a Protestant minister, wanted him to learn an artistic trade and in April 1798 brought him to Dresden where he apprenticed with Charles Rodolphe August Wenzky, maker of organs and pianos to the court. After five years, Petzold travelled to Vienna with a letter of recommendation from Wenzky to Walther for whom he worked until departing for Paris in December 1805. Petzold formed a partnership with J. Pfeiffer in April 1806, and their first products were a cabinet upright which Petzold called the harmomelo, and a well received triangular piano, followed by an improved square. The partners established their own workshops in 1814, and the sound, regulation and construction of Petzold's subsequent instruments earned him a distinguished reputation.

The enlarged soundboard Petzold introduced in square pianos at the 1806 French National Exposition received little notice. Its purpose was to increase the amount of sound, but the arrangement increased the height of the strings and required greater action leverage than the English square action could provide. Petzold substituted a variation of an English grand action with a crank escapement and individual hammer flanges, but the heavier blows it allowed required heavier stringing, which in turn required stronger frames. These changes gave his squares an unprecedented fullness and capacity for expression, and indicated the direction of subsequent changes that would take place in the art of constructing, as well as writing for and performing on pianos.

== Notes ==
1. This was a vertically strung, full size upright with underdampers operated by a crank from the keys. (Harding. p248); Fetis mistakes it for a kind of upright grand.
