= LongPen =

Remote signing device

The LongPen is a remote signing device that allows a user to produce a signature on a physical document from a distant location. It was invented by writer Margaret Atwood in 2004 and debuted in 2006. It allows a person to write remotely in ink anywhere connected to the Internet, via a touchscreen device operating a robotic hand. The system also supports a live audio and video connection between the signer and the receiving location.

== History ==
The concept was conceived by Canadian author Margaret Atwood in early 2004, while she was on a paperback book tour for her novel Oryx and Crake, with the initial aim of allowing authors to sign books for readers without travelling. In 2004, Atwood co-founded Unotchit Inc. (Note: Pronounced "you-no-touch-it".) with Matthew Gibson to develop the technology. Engineering development was carried out in partnership with Quanser Consulting Inc., a Toronto-based control-systems firm. The system was publicly demonstrated at the London Book Fair in March 2006. The first transatlantic signing using the system took place from Toronto on 24 September 2006. In late 2007, Conrad Black, who was on bail in the United States and awaiting sentencing in a fraud case, used the LongPen from his home in Florida to sign copies of his biography of Richard Nixon at a Toronto book event introduced by Atwood. Unotchit Inc. subsequently shifted its focus from author book-signings to business and legal transaction signing and was renamed Syngrafii Inc. The LongPen became one component of a broader remote-signing product line.

== Technology ==
The system consists of an input device on which the signer writes, software that captures the kinematics and pressure of the signature, and a robotic writing arm at the receiving end that reproduces the signature in ink on a physical document. Unlike an autopen, which reproduces a stored signature without the signatory present, the LongPen produces a one-time original signature in real time, in conjunction with an audio-video link between the parties. The underlying technology is the subject of patents filed by Unotchit Inc. and Syngrafii Inc. (Note: This includes U.S. patent 8,867,062 ("Remote signing system"), filed 25 November 2005 and issued 21 October 2014.)

== See also ==
- Autopen
- Electronic signature
- Telautograph
