= Telautograph =

Analog precursor to the modern fax machine

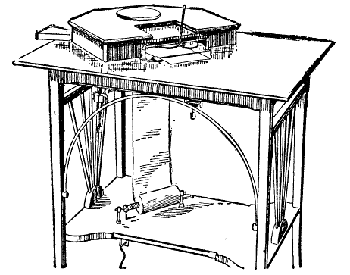
An early telautograph machine

The telautograph is an ancestor of the modern fax machine. It transmits electrical signals representing the position of a pen or tracer at the sending station to repeating mechanisms attached to a pen at the receiving station, thus reproducing at the receiving station a drawing, writing, or signature made by the sender. It was the first such device to transmit drawings to a stationary sheet of paper; previous inventions in Europe had used a constantly moving strip of paper to make such transmissions and the pen could not be lifted between words. Surprisingly, at least from a modern perspective, some early telautographs used digital/pulse-based transmission while later more successful devices reverted to analog signaling

== Invention ==
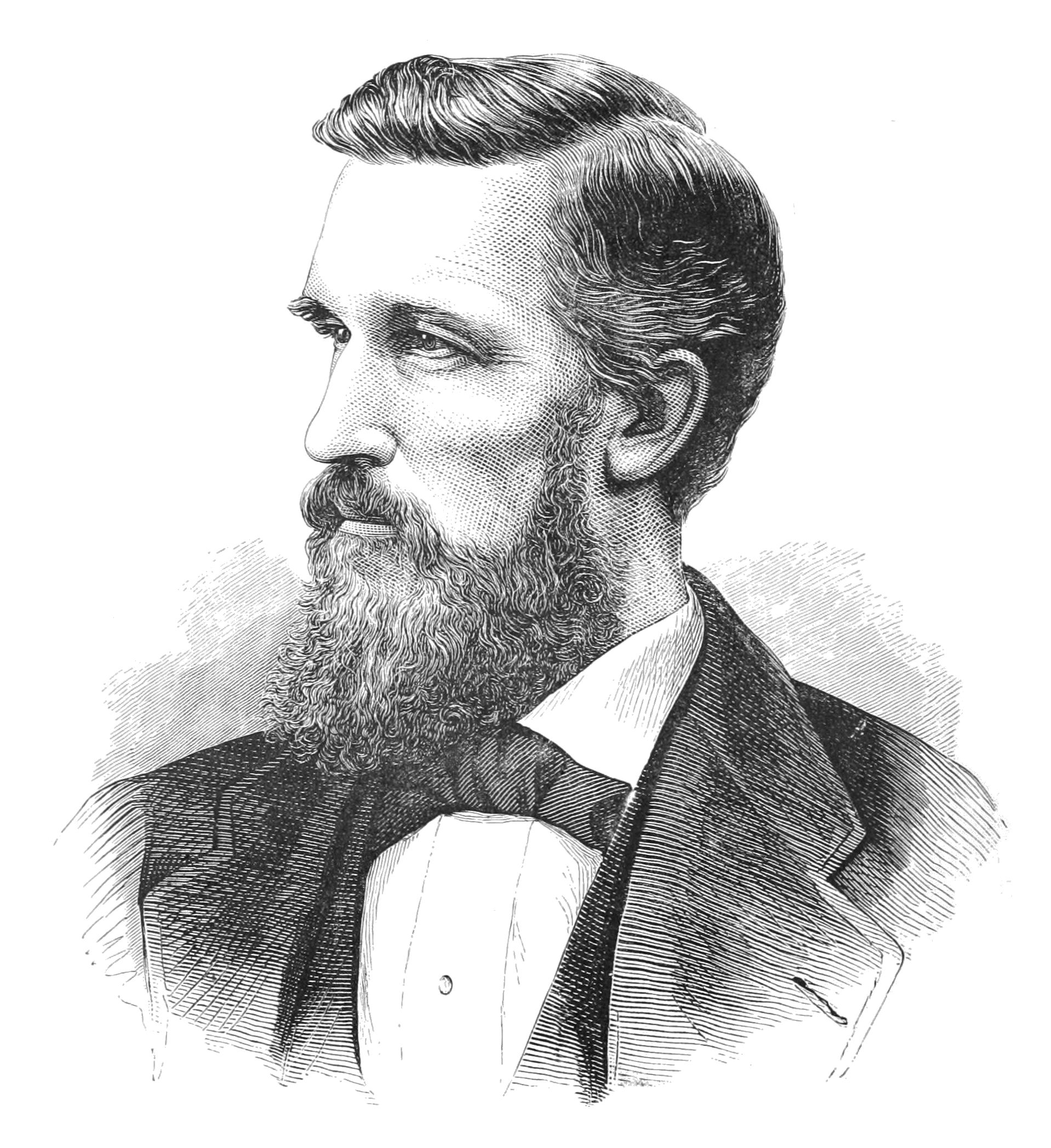
The inventor Elisha Gray

The telautograph's invention is attributed to the American engineer Elisha Gray, who patented it on July 31, 1888. Gray's patent stated that the telautograph would allow "one to transmit his own handwriting to a distant point over a two-wire circuit." It was the first facsimile machine in which the stylus was controlled by horizontal and vertical bars. The telautograph was first publicly exhibited at the 1893 World's Columbian Exposition held in Chicago.

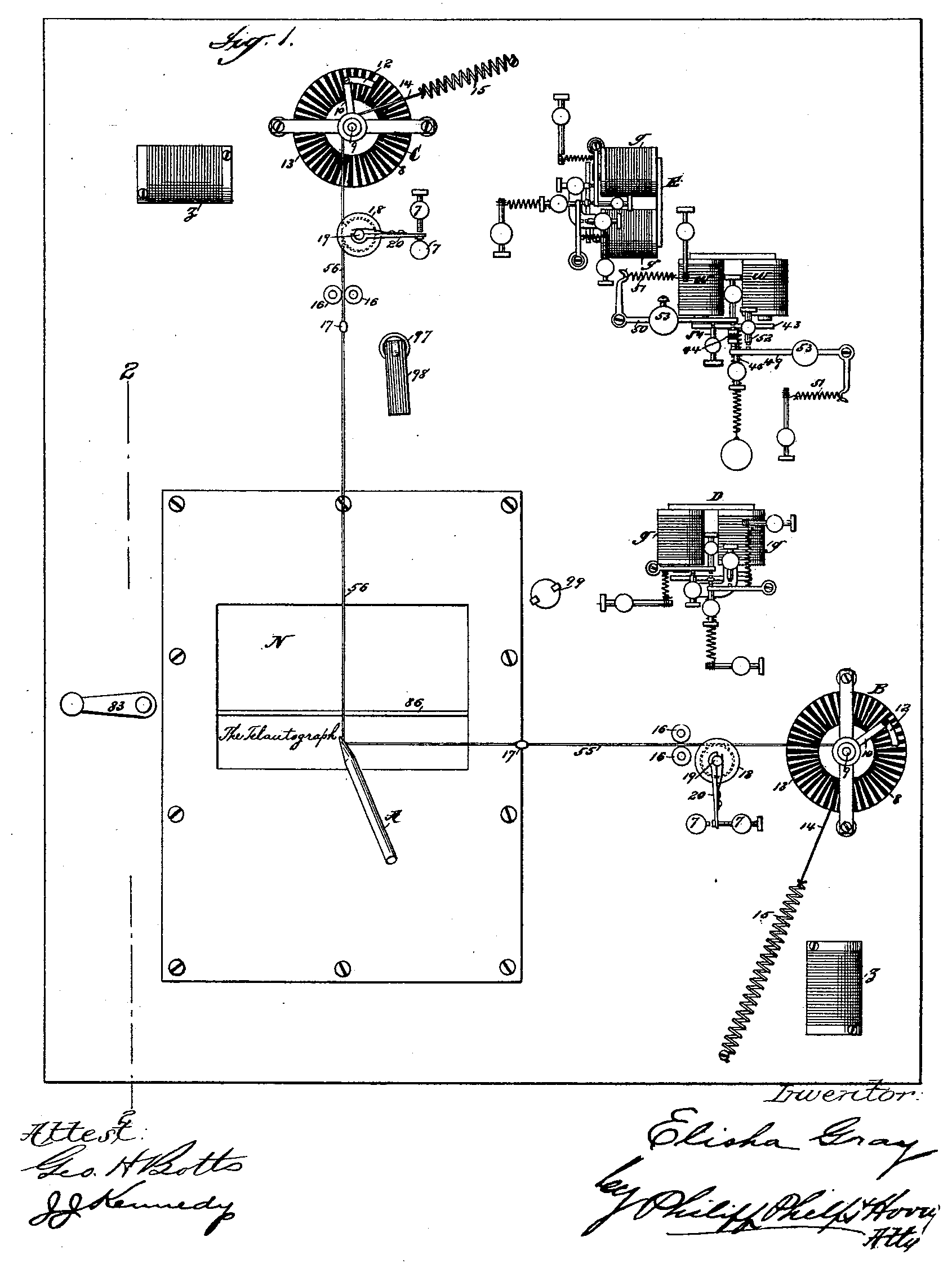
Telautograph patent schema

Gray started experimenting in 1887 with analog transmission of the pen position signals using variable resistances as was done in previous devices, but was dissatisfied with the performance he achieved. He then turned to pulse-based or digital pen position transmission.

Gray's early patents show devices to accomplish the required functions over two line wire circuits with a common ground connection. Pulses were sent over each wire to signal small steps of pen movement. Momentary current interruptions of a baseline direct current signaled pen lifting/lowering and paper feed, and changing polarities were used to encode pen movement direction.

While the patent schema's geometry implies vertical and horizontal coordinates, Gray's first practical system (discussed later) had a different coordinate scheme, based on transmitting two radial distances along approximately diagonal directions from two fixed points. Later systems used in the 20th century transmitted the angle of two crank arm joints in a five bar linkage, comprising two pen motor cranks, two pen linkage bars, and the body of the instrument.

In an 1888 interview in The Manufacturer & Builder (Vol. 24: No. 4: pages 85–86) Gray said:

By my invention you can sit down in your office in Chicago, take a pencil in your hand, write a message to me, and as your pencil moves, a pencil here in my laboratory moves simultaneously, and forms the same letters and words in the same way. What you write in Chicago is instantly reproduced here in fac-simile. You may write in any language, use a code or cipher, no matter, a fac-simile is produced here. If you want to draw a picture it is the same, the picture is reproduced here. The artist of your newspaper can, by this device, telegraph his pictures of a railway wreck or other occurrences just as a reporter telegraphs his description in words.

However these first devices were crude to the point of uselessness. Some of his subsequent refinements changed the encoding scheme. They also mention use of four wires for increased speed and accuracy, but the additional wires were later abandoned. It's clear from the commentary in these and other patents that Gray needed to increase the speed and accuracy of his pulse based system, and in fact he patented a large number of increasingly complicated and refined mechanisms to achieve this.

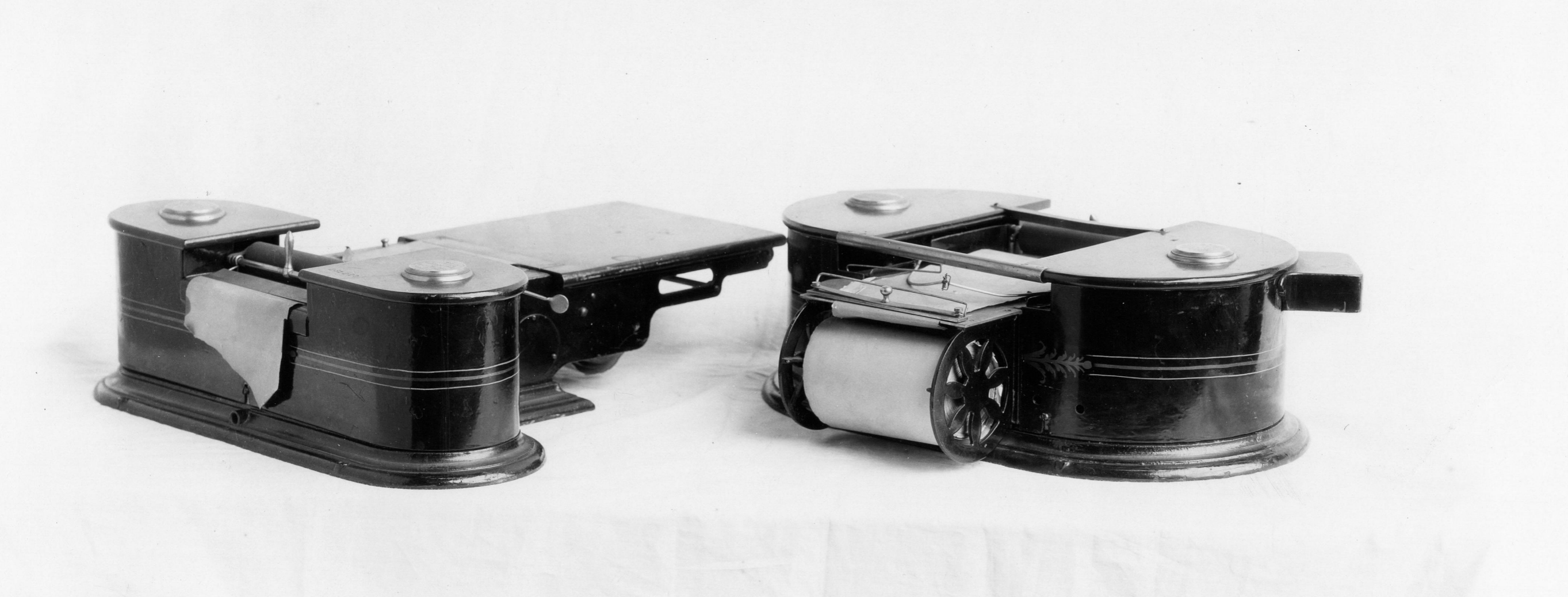
Elisha Gray's Telautograph Receiver and Transmitter c. 1893

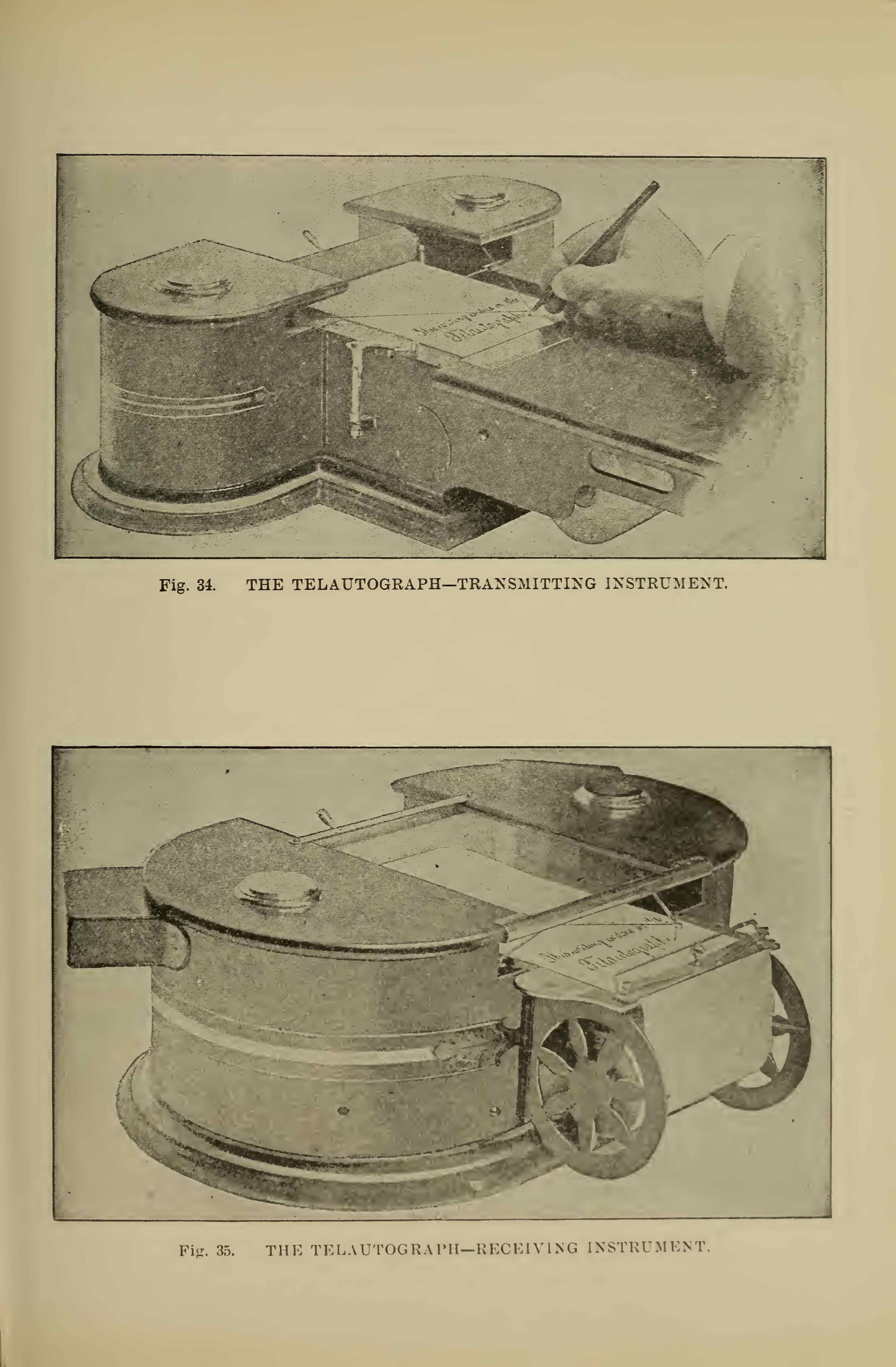
Elisha Gray's Telautograph Transmitter and Receiver in use

In 1893 Gray's system using the mechanism seen in Pat. US491347 was good enough to exhibit at the Chicago World's Fair and at a Royal Society conversazione in London in 1894. An article in Manufacturer and Builder of this year describes the current and previous versions. Apparently at this stage Gray used 40 steps per inch. It's clear how challenging the technical problem was; a later film of a similar device shows the rapidity with which an operator might move the pen. This type of use would produce perhaps 600-1000 pulses per second on a digital system, a challenge for any electromechanical system connected over earth return telephone/telegraph lines. A more elegant technology was around the corner, and an analog coup was being staged at the turn of the century.

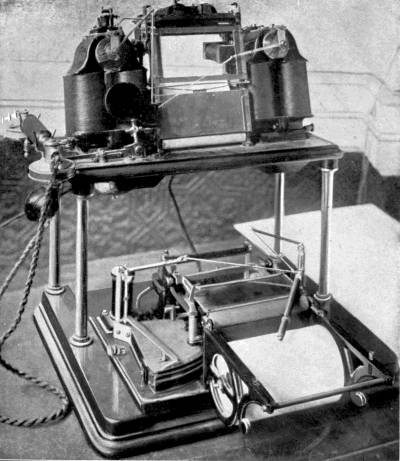
Foster Ritchie's Telautograph Receiver and Transmitter c. 1904

By the end of the 19th century the telautograph was modified by Foster Ritchie, a former Gray assistant. Calling it the telewriter, Ritchie's version of the telautograph could be used for either copying or speaking over the same telephone connection.

Ritchie had returned to the analog principle and made it work well. He did this by adding an AC signal whenever the pen needed to be lowered, on top of the direct current position signal already on the line wires. The angle of the two pen crank bars was turned into the position signal by two rheostats, driving large D'Arsonval movements at the receiver that moved similar crank bars, in turn moving the receiver pen. Interruption of the direct current advanced the paper.

The AC pen lowering signal was highly important. If Ritchie understood the significance of this technique, he strangely failed to reveal (or protect) this principle in his patents. George S. Tiffany on behalf of the Gray National Telautograph Company understood the significance of the AC signal quite well. In the patent he filed shortly after and presumably in response to Ritchie he explains that the use of either an AC signal superimposed on the pen current signal or intentional mechanical vibrations added at the receiver can overcome static pen and actuator friction, and allow the pen to follow the transmitter quite perfectly. This principle is in common use today in the form of dither, as applied to proportional pneumatic and hydraulic control valves and regulators. A dither signal can overcome both magnetic hysteresis and static friction and was preferable to mechanical vibration, as later Telautograph designs used it exclusively.

Apparently this technique worked well, because even though Tiffany studiously avoided every constructional feature of Ritchie's patent, he used the exact same fundamental technique, and the analog telautograph principle continued to be used for at least the next 35 years, such as in those installed in the Frick Art Reference Library around 1935, also see interior view. Tiffany patents after 1901 refined the mechanism but not the principle.

Ritchie marketed his design as the Telewriter in the UK. The claim in this last reference that the phone and Ritchie's telautograph could be used simultaneously over the same line is dubious given the interference to be expected between the AC pen control signal and a phone signal, and statements to the contrary in Ritchie's patents. Contemporary accounts describe the operations separately and not together or even describe the telautograph being disconnected when the telephone was in use.

All available images and descriptions of commercial telautographs after 1901 depict the open loop analog devices that Ritchie pioneered. While Tiffany did eventually design a servomechanism controlled telautograph in 1916 it's not clear if this was ever commercialized.

== Usage ==
The telautograph became very popular for the transmission of signatures over a distance, and in banks and large hospitals to ensure that doctors' orders and patient information were transmitted quickly and accurately.

Teleautograph systems were installed in a number of major railroad stations to relay hand-written reports of train movements from the interlocking tower to various parts of the station. The teleautograph network in Grand Central Terminal included a public display in the main concourse into the 1960s; a similar setup in Chicago Union Station remained in operation into the 1970s.

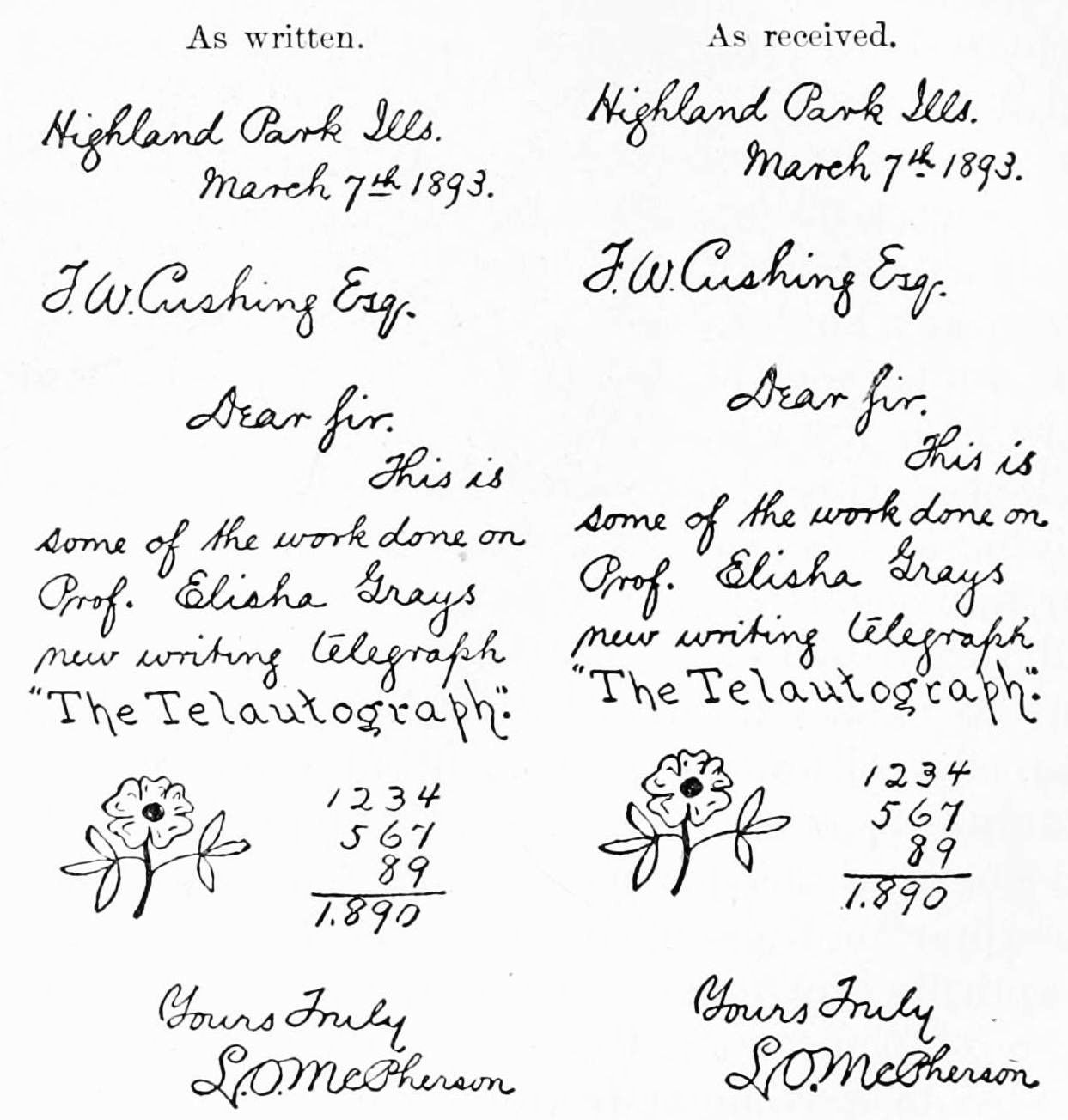
Sample work of telautograph

A telautograph was used in 1911 to warn workers on the 10th floor about the Triangle Shirtwaist Factory fire that had broken out two floors below.

An example of a telautograph machine writing script can be seen in the 1956 movie Earth vs the Flying Saucers as the output device for the mechanical translator. The 1936 movie Sinner Take All shows it being used in an office setting to secretly message instructions to a secretary. A Telautograph can be seen in episode 7 "Harem" in the second season of The Streets of San Francisco released on October 25th 1973.

The Telautograph Corporation changed its name several times. In 1971, it was acquired by Arden/Mayfair. In 1993, Danka Industries purchased the company and renamed it Danka/Omnifax. In 1999, Xerox corporation purchased the company and called it the Omnifax division, which has since been absorbed by the corporation.

Machines like the telautograph are still in use today. The Allpoint Pen is currently in use and has been used to register tens of thousands of voters in the United States, and the LongPen, an invention conceived of by writer Margaret Atwood, is used by authors to sign their books at a distance.
