= Piano pedals =

Foot-operated levers at the base of a piano

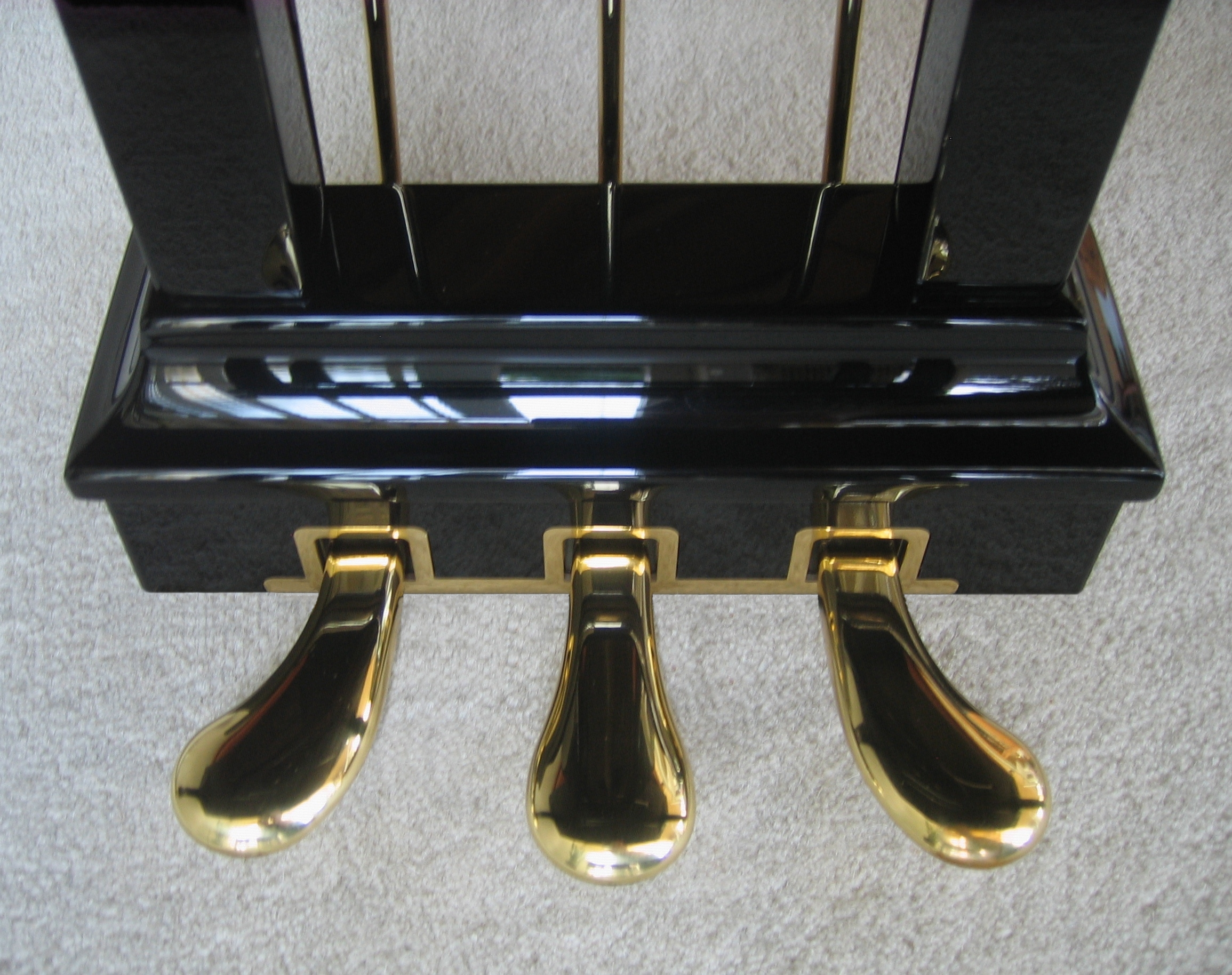
Piano pedals from left to right: soft pedal, sostenuto pedal and sustain pedal

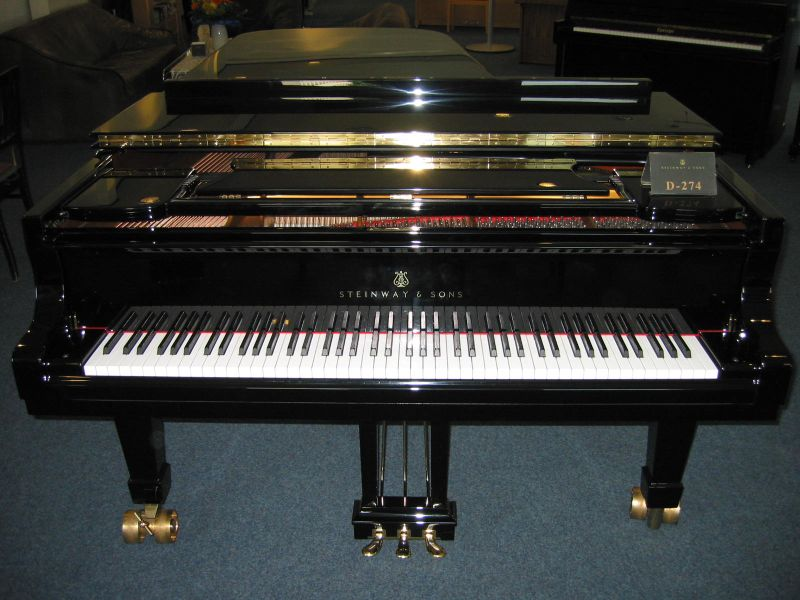
An overview of the piano pedals, which are found under the keyboard of the piano

Piano pedals are foot-operated levers at the base of a piano that change the instrument's sound in various ways. Modern pianos usually have three pedals: from left to right, the soft pedal (or una corda), the sostenuto pedal, and the sustaining pedal (or damper pedal). Some pianos omit the sostenuto pedal, or have a middle pedal with a different purpose, such as a muting function, also known as the silent piano.

The development of the piano's pedals is an evolution that began in the very earliest days of the piano and continued through the late 19th century. Throughout the years, the piano had as few as one modifying stop, and as many as six or more, before finally arriving at its current configuration of three.

== Individual pedals ==
=== Damper pedal ===
The damper pedal, sustain pedal, or sustaining pedal is to the right of the other pedals, and is used more often than the other pedals. It raises all the dampers off the strings so that they keep vibrating after the player releases the key. In effect, the damper pedal makes every string on the piano a sympathetic string, creating a rich tonal quality. This effect may be behind the saying that the damper pedal is "... the soul of the piano." The damper pedal has the secondary function of allowing the player to connect into a legato texture notes that otherwise could not thus be played.

=== Soft pedal ===
The soft pedal, or una corda pedal, was invented by Bartolomeo Cristofori. It was the first mechanism invented to modify the piano's sound. This function is typically operated by the left pedal on modern pianos. Neither of its common names—soft pedal or una corda pedal—completely describe the pedal's function. The una corda primarily modifies the timbre, not just the volume, of the piano. Soon after its invention, virtually all makers integrated the una corda as a standard fixture. On Cristofori's pianos, the una corda mechanism was operated by a hand stop, not a pedal. The stop was a knob on the side of the keyboard. When the una corda was activated, the entire action shifted to the right so that the hammers hit one string (una corda) instead of two strings (due corde). Dominic Gill says that when the hammers strike only one string, the piano "produces a softer, more ethereal tone".

By the late 18th century, piano builders had begun triple stringing the notes on the piano. This change, affecting the una corda's function, is described by Joseph Banowetz:

On the pianos of the late eighteenth to early nineteenth centuries, the pianist could shift from the normal three-string (tre corde) position to one in which either two strings (due corde) or only one (una corda) would be struck, depending on how far the player depressed the pedal. This subtle but important choice does not exist on modern pianos, but was readily available on the earlier instruments.

The sound of the una corda on early pianos created a larger difference in color and timbre than it does on the modern piano. On the modern piano, the una corda pedal makes the hammers of the treble section hit two strings instead of three. In the case of the bass strings, the hammer normally strikes either one or two strings per note. The lowest bass notes on the piano are a single thicker string. For these notes, the action shifts the hammer so that it strikes the string on a different, lesser-used part of the hammer nose.

Edwin Good states,

On the modern piano, the timbre is subtly different, but many people cannot hear it. In that respect, at least, the modern piano does not give the player the flexibility of changing tone quality that early ones did.

Beethoven took advantage of the ability of his piano to create a wide range of tone color in two of his piano works. In his Piano Concerto No. 4, Beethoven specifies the use of una corda, due corde, and tre corde. He calls for una corda, then "poco a poco due ed allora tutte le corde", gradually two and then all strings, in Sonata Op. 106.

==== Half-blow pedal ====
On the modern upright piano, the left pedal is not truly an una corda, because it does not shift the action sideways. The strings run at such an oblique angle to the hammers that if the action moved sideways, the hammer might strike one string of the wrong note. A more accurate term for the left pedal on an upright piano is the half-blow pedal. When the pedal is activated, the hammers move closer to the strings, so that there is less distance for the hammer to swing.

=== Sostenuto pedal ===
The last pedal added to the modern grand was the middle pedal, the sostenuto. Using this pedal, a pianist can sustain selected notes, while other notes remain unaffected. The sostenuto was first shown at the French Industrial Exposition of 1844 in Paris, by Boisselot & Fils, a Marseille company. French piano builders Alexandre François Debain and Claude Montal built sostenuto mechanisms in 1860 and 1862, respectively. These innovative efforts did not immediately catch on with other piano builders. In 1874, Albert Steinway perfected and patented the sostenuto pedal. He began to advertise it publicly in 1876, and soon the Steinway company was including it on all of their grands and their high-end uprights. Other American piano builders quickly adopted the sostenuto pedal into their piano design. The adoption by European manufacturers went far more slowly and was essentially completed only in recent times.

The term "sostenuto" ("sustained") can be confusing in light of the pre-existing sustain (or "damper") pedal on modern pianos. The sostenuto pedal was originally called the "tone-sustaining" pedal, reflecting its role in sustaining a single tone or group of tones.

The sostenuto pedal holds up only dampers that were already raised at the moment that it was depressed. The effect, therefore, is that when the player plays one or more keys, depresses the pedal, and subsequently releases those keys, the played notes are sustained until the pedal is lifted. Any subsequently played notes played whilst the pedal is already depressed are damped normally when released.

Uses for the sostenuto pedal include playing transcriptions of organ music, where selective sustaining of notes can substitute for the organ's held notes in its pedals; or in contemporary music, especially spectral music. The sostenuto pedal is typically played with the right foot.

=== Other common uses for the middle pedal ===
It is common to find uprights and even grand pianos that lack a middle pedal. Even if a piano has a middle pedal, one cannot assume it is a true sostenuto, for there are many other functions a middle pedal can have other than that of sostenuto. Often an upright's middle pedal is another half-blow pedal, like the one on the left, except that the middle pedal slides into a groove to stay engaged. Sometimes, the middle pedal may only operate the bass dampers. The middle pedal may sometimes lower a muffler rail of felt between the hammers and the strings to mute and significantly soften the sound, so that one can practice quietly (also known as a "Practice Rail"). True sostenuto is rare on uprights, except for more expensive models such as those from Steinway and Bechstein. They are more common on digital pianos as the effect is straightforward to mimic in software.

=== Other pedals ===
Among other pedals sometimes found on early pianos are the lute stop, moderator or celeste, bassoon, buff, cembalo, and swell. The lute pedal created a pizzicato-type sound. The moderator, or celeste mechanism used a layer of soft cloth or leather between hammers and strings to provide a sweet, muted quality. According to Good, "[The piece of leather or cloth was] graduated in thickness across its short dimension. The farther down one pushed the pedal, the farther the rail lowered and the thicker the material through which the hammer struck the strings. With the thicker material, the sound was softer and more muffled. Such a stop was sometimes called a pianissimo stop."

The moderator stop was popular on Viennese pianos, and a similar mechanism is still sometimes fitted on upright pianos today in the form of the practice rail (see Sostenuto pedal, above). Joseph Banowetz states that for the bassoon pedal, paper or silk was placed over the bass strings to create "...a buzzing noise that listeners of the day felt resembled the sound of the bassoon." The buff stop and cembalo stops seem similar to each other in method of manipulation and sound produced. The buff ("leather") stop used "...a narrow strip of soft leather ... pressed against the strings to give a dry, soft tone of little sustaining power." The cembalo stop pressed leather weights on the strings and modified the sound to make it resemble that of the harpsichord. Johannes Pohlmann used a swell pedal on his pianos to raise and lower the lid of the piano to control the overall volume. Instead of raising and lowering the lid, the swell was sometimes operated by opening and closing slots in the sides of the piano case.

Famous for his pianos, Muzio Clementi was a composer and musician who founded a piano-building company, and was active in the designing of the pianos that his company built. The Clementi piano firm was later renamed Collard and Collard in 1830, two years before Clementi's death. Clementi added a feature called a harmonic swell. "[This pedal] introduced a kind of reverberation effect to give the instrument a fuller, richer sound. The effect uses the sympathetic vibrations set up in the untuned non-speaking length of the strings. Here the soundboard is bigger than usual to accommodate a second bridge (the 'bridge of reverberation')."

The Dolce Campana pedal pianoforte c. 1850, built by Boardman and Gray, New York, demonstrated yet another creative way of modifying the piano's sound. A pedal controlled a series of hammers or weights attached to the soundboard that would fall onto an equal number of screws, and created the sound of bells or the harp. The Fazioli concert grand piano model F308 includes a fourth pedal to the left of the traditional three pedals. This pedal acts similarly to the "half-blow" pedal on an upright piano, in that it collectively moves the hammers somewhat closer to the strings to reduce the volume without changing the tone quality, as the una-corda does. The F308 is the first modern concert grand to offer such a feature.

==== Novelty pedals ====
In the early years of piano development, many novelty pedals and stops were experimented with before finally settling on the three that are now used on the modern piano. Some of these pedals were meant to modify levels of volume, color, or timbre, while others were used for special effects, meant to imitate other instruments. Banowetz speaks of these novelty pedals: "At their worst, these modifications threatened to make the piano into a vulgar musical toy"; professional musicians did not like them.

==== Janissary or janizary pedals ====
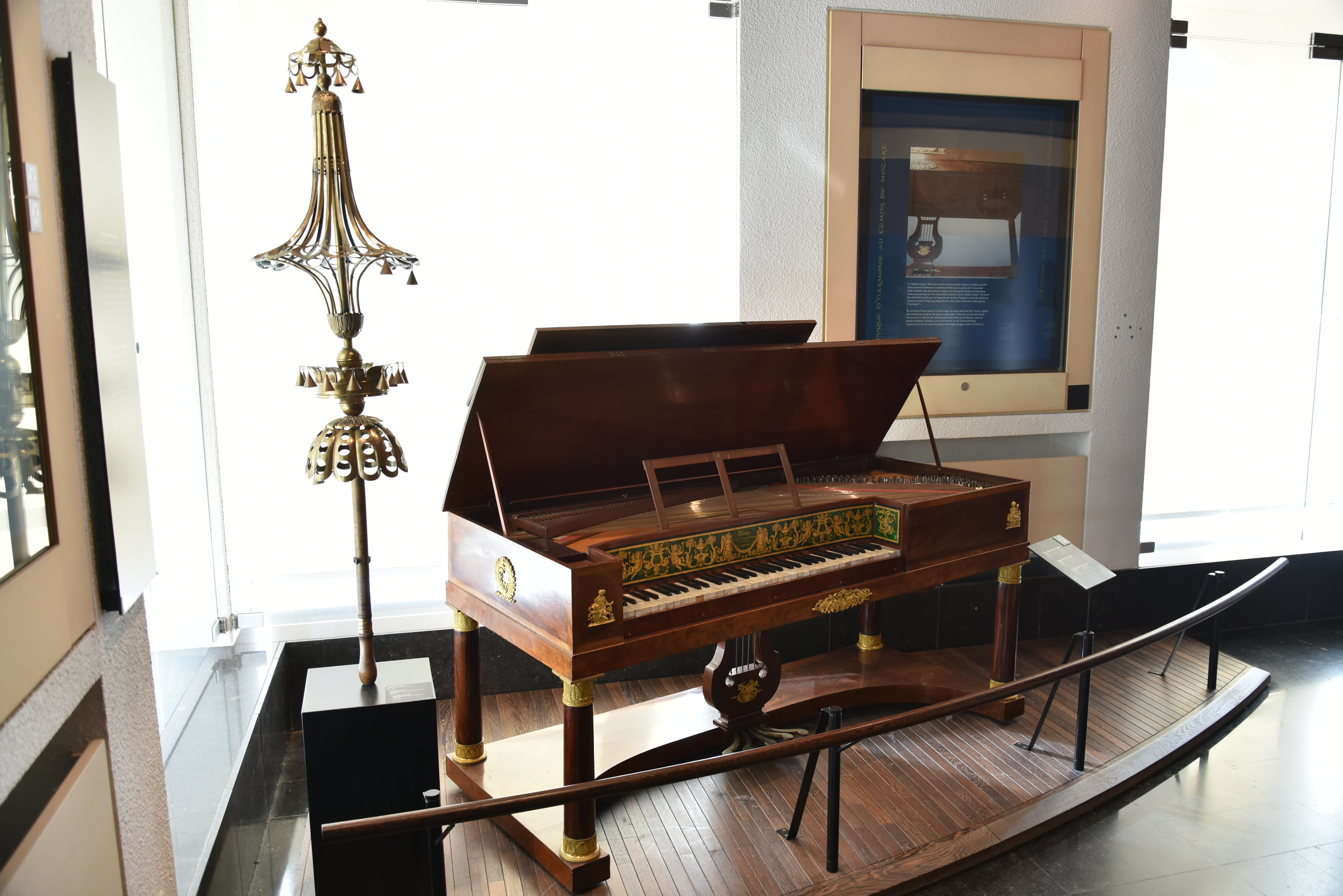
Table piano with Turkish pedal (J. Pfeiffer, 1818) at MIM Brussels has five pedals for percussion instruments including tambourine.

During the late 18th century, Europeans developed a love for Turkish band music, and the Turkish music style was an outgrowth of this. According to Good, this possibly began "when King Augustus the Strong of Poland received the gift of a Turkish military band at some time after 1710." "Janissary" or "janizary" refers to the Turkish military band that used instruments including drums, cymbals, and bells, among other loud, cacophonous instruments. Owing to the desire of composers and players to imitate the sounds of the Turkish military marching bands, piano builders began including pedals on their pianos by which snare and bass drums, bells, cymbals, or the triangle could be played by the touch of a pedal while simultaneously playing the keyboard.

Up to six pedals controlled all these sound effects. Alfred Dolge states, "The Janizary pedal, one of the best known of the early pedal devices, added all kinds of rattling noises to the normal piano performance. It could cause a drumstick to strike the underside of the soundboard, ring bells, shake a rattle, and even create the effect of a cymbal crash by hitting several bass strings with a strip of brass foil." Mozart's Rondo alla Turca, from Sonata K. 331, written in 1778, was sometimes played using these Janissary effects.

== Development ==
=== Hand stops ===
The sustaining, or damper stop, was first controlled by the hand, and was included on some of the earliest pianos ever built. Stops operated by hand were inconvenient for the player, who would have to continue playing with one hand while operating the stop with the other. If this was not possible, an assistant would be used to change the stop, just as organists do even today. Johannes Zumpe's square piano, made in London in 1767, had two hand stops in the case, which acted as sustaining stops for the bass strings and the treble strings.

=== Knee levers ===
The knee lever to replace the hand stop for the damper control was developed in Germany sometime around 1765. According to David Crombie, "virtually all the fortepianos of the last three decades of the eighteenth century were equipped with a knee lever to raise and lower the dampers ... "

Sometime around 1777, Mozart had an opportunity to play a piano built by Johann Andreas Stein, who had been an apprentice of Gottfried Silbermann. This piano had knee levers, and Mozart speaks highly of their functionality in a letter: "The machine which you move with the knee is also made better by [Stein] than by others. I scarcely touch it, when off it goes; and as soon as I take my knee the least bit away, you can't hear the slightest after-sound."

The only piano Mozart ever owned was one by Anton Walter, c. 1782–1785. It had two knee levers; the one on the left raised all the dampers, while the one on the right raised only the treble dampers. A moderator stop to produce a softer sound (see Other pedals, above) was centrally above the keyboard.

=== Pedals ===
Although there is some controversy among authorities as to which piano builder was actually the first to employ pedals rather than knee levers, one could say that pedals are a characteristic first developed by manufacturers in England. James Parakilas states that the damper stop was introduced by Gottfried Silbermann, who was the first German piano builder. Parakilas, however, does not specify whether Silbermann's damper stop was in the form of a hand lever, knee lever, or pedal. However, many successful English piano builders had apprenticed with Silbermann in Germany, and then left for London as a result of the disturbances of the Seven Years' War in Saxony. Among those who re-located to England were Johannes Zumpe, Americus Backers, and Adam Beyer. Americus Backers, Adam Beyer, and John Broadwood, all piano builders in England, are credited as being among the first to incorporate the new feature. Americus Backers' 1772 grand, his only surviving instrument, has what are believed to be original pedals, and is most likely the first piano to use pedals rather than knee levers. A square piano built by Adam Beyer of London in 1777 has a damper pedal, as do pianos built by John Broadwood, ca. 1783.

After their invention, pedals did not immediately become the accepted form for piano stops. German and Viennese builders continued to use the knee levers for quite some time after the English were using pedals. Pedals and knee levers were even used together on the same instrument on a Nannette Streicher grand built in Vienna in 1814. This piano had two knee levers that were Janissary stops for bell and drum, and four pedals for una corda, bassoon, dampers, and moderator.

== Beethoven and pedals ==
Throughout his lifetime, Ludwig van Beethoven owned several different pianos by different makers, all with different pedal configurations. His pianos are fine examples of some experimental and innovative pedal designs of the time. In 1803, the French piano company Erard gave him a grand, "[thought to be] the most advanced French grand piano of the time... It had... four pedals, including an una-corda, a damper lift, a lute stop, and a moderator for softening the tone."

Beethoven's Broadwood grand, presented as a gift to him from the Broadwood company in 1817, had an una corda pedal and a split damper pedal — one half was the damper for the treble strings, the other half for the bass strings. In an effort to give Beethoven an instrument loud enough for him to hear when his hearing was failing, Conrad Graf designed an instrument in 1824 especially for Beethoven with quadruple stringing instead of triple. Graf made only three instruments of this nature. David Crombie describes this instrument: "By adding an extra string, Graf attempted to obtain a tone that was richer and more powerful, though it didn't make the instrument any louder than his Broadwood." This extra string would have provided a bigger contrast when applying keyboard-shifting stops, because this keyboard shift pedal moved the action from four to two strings. Crombie states: "These provide a much wider control over the character of the sound than is possible on Graf's usual instruments."

This piano included five pedals: a keyboard shift (quad to due corde); bassoon; moderator 1; moderator 2; and dampers. A different four-string system, aliquot stringing, was invented by Julius Blüthner in 1873 and remains a feature of Blüthner pianos. The Blüthner aliquot system uses an additional (fourth) string in each note of the upper three octaves. This string is slightly higher than the other three strings so that it is not struck by the hammer. When the hammer strikes the three conventional strings, the aliquot string vibrates sympathetically.

As a composer and pianist, Beethoven experimented extensively with pedal. His first marking to indicate use of a pedal in a score was in his first two piano concertos, in 1795. Earlier than this, Beethoven had called for the use of the knee lever in a sketch from 1790 to 1792; "with the knee" is marked for a series of chords. According to Joseph Banowetz, "This is the earliest-known indication for a damper control in a score." Haydn did not specify its use in a score until 1794. In all, there are nearly 800 indications for pedal in authentic sources of Beethoven's compositions, making him by far the first composer to be highly prolific in pedal usage.

== Pedal piano ==
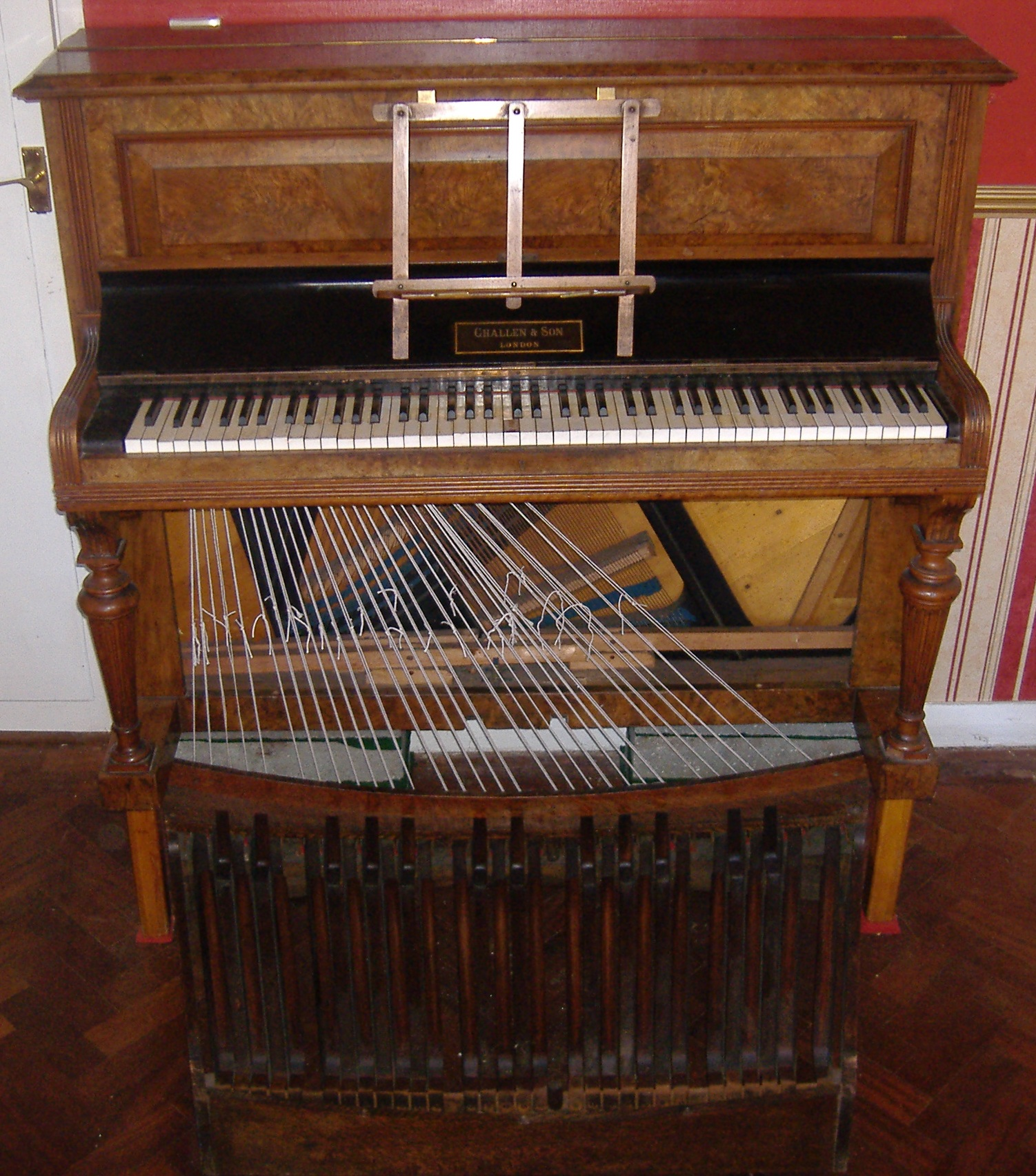
An upright pedal piano

Along with the development of the pedals on the piano came the phenomenon of the pedal piano, a piano with a pedalboard. Some of the early pedal pianos date back to 1815. The pedal piano developed partially for organists to be able to practice pedal keyboard parts away from the pipe organ. In some instances, the pedal piano was actually a special type of piano with a built-in pedal board and a higher keyboard and bench, like an organ. Other times, an independent pedal board and set of strings could be connected to a regular grand piano. Mozart had a pedalboard made for his piano. His father, Leopold, speaks of this pedalboard in a letter: "[the pedal] stands under the instrument and is about two feet longer and extremely heavy".

Alfred Dolge writes of the pedal mechanisms that his uncle, Louis Schone, constructed for both Robert Schumann and Felix Mendelssohn in 1843. Schumann preferred the pedal board to be connected to the upright piano, while Mendelssohn had a pedal mechanism connected to his grand piano. Dolge describes Mendelssohn's pedal mechanism: "The keyboard for pedaling was placed under the keyboard for manual playing, had 29 notes and was connected with an action placed at the back of the piano where a special soundboard, covered with 29 strings, was built into the case".

In addition to using his pedal piano for organ practice, Schumann composed several pieces specifically for the pedal piano. Among these compositions are Six Studies Op. 56, Four Sketches Op. 58, and Six Fugues on Bach Op. 60. Other composers who used pedal pianos were Mozart, Liszt, Alkan and Gounod.

The piano, and specifically the pedal mechanism and stops underwent much experimentation during the formative years of the instrument, before finally arriving at the current pedal configuration. Banowetz states, "These and a good number of other novelty pedal mechanisms eventually faded from existence as the piano grew to maturity in the latter part of the nineteenth century, finally leaving as survivors of this tortuous evolution only today's basic three pedals".

== Location ==
The location of pedals on the piano was another aspect of pedal development that fluctuated greatly during the evolution of the instrument. Piano builders were quite creative with their pedal placement on pianos, which sometimes gave the instruments a comical look, compared to what is usually seen today. The oldest surviving English grand, built by Backers in 1772, and many Broadwood grands had two pedals, una corda and damper, which were attached to the legs on the left and right of the keyboard. James Parakilas describes this pedal location as giving the piano a "pigeon-toed look", for they turned in slightly. A table piano built by Jean-Henri Pape in the mid-19th century had pedals on the two front legs of the piano, but unlike those on the Backers and Broadwood, these pedals faced straight in towards each other rather than out.

A particularly unusual design is demonstrated in the "Dog Kennel" piano. It was built by Sebastien Mercer in 1831, and was nicknamed the "Dog Kennel" piano because of its shape. Under the upright piano where the modern pedals would be located is a semi-circular hollow space where the feet of the player could rest. The una corda and damper pedals are at the left and right of this space, and face straight in, like the table piano pedals. Eventually during the 19th century, pedals were attached to a frame located centrally underneath the piano, to strengthen and stabilize the mechanism. According to Parakilas, this framework on the grand piano "often took the symbolic shape and name of a lyre", and it still carries the name "pedal lyre" today.

== Development in pedal configuration ==
Although the piano and its pedal configuration has been in its current form since the late 19th century, there was a development in 1987. The Fazioli piano company in Sacile, Italy, designed the longest grand piano produced up to now (10 feet 2 inches [3.10 m]). This piano includes four pedals: damper; sostenuto; una corda; and half-blow.

== Electronic keyboards ==
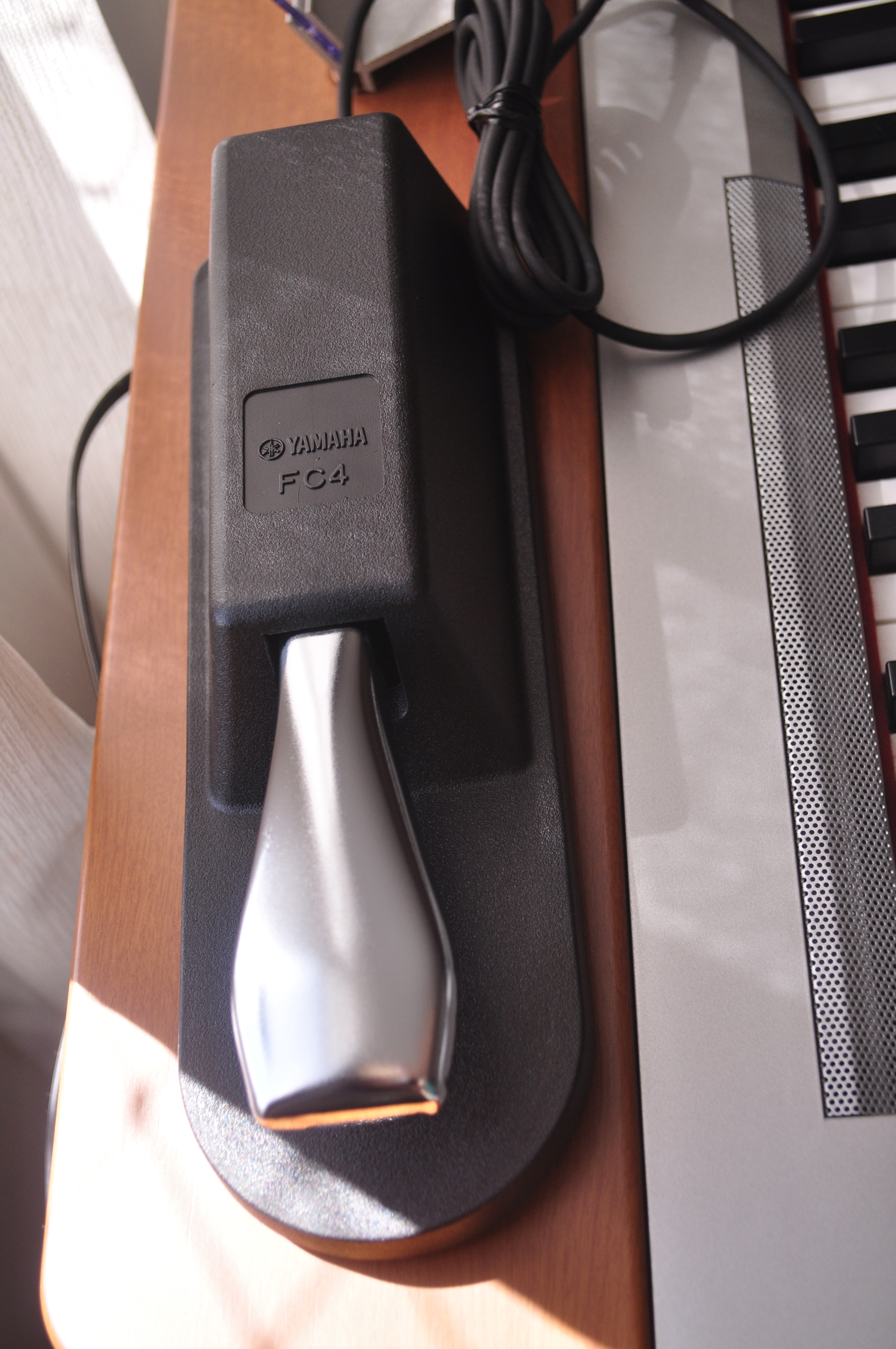
An external pedal that is plugged into an electronic keyboard, typically to act as the sustain pedal

In the 21st century, electronic keyboards and stage pianos typically have a jack for an external pedal. Some instruments have additional jacks, allowing for the connection of three pedals, like a grand piano. Digital pianos typically have pedals built in. The pedal itself is usually a simple switch, although more sophisticated pedals can detect and transmit a signal for half-pedaling.

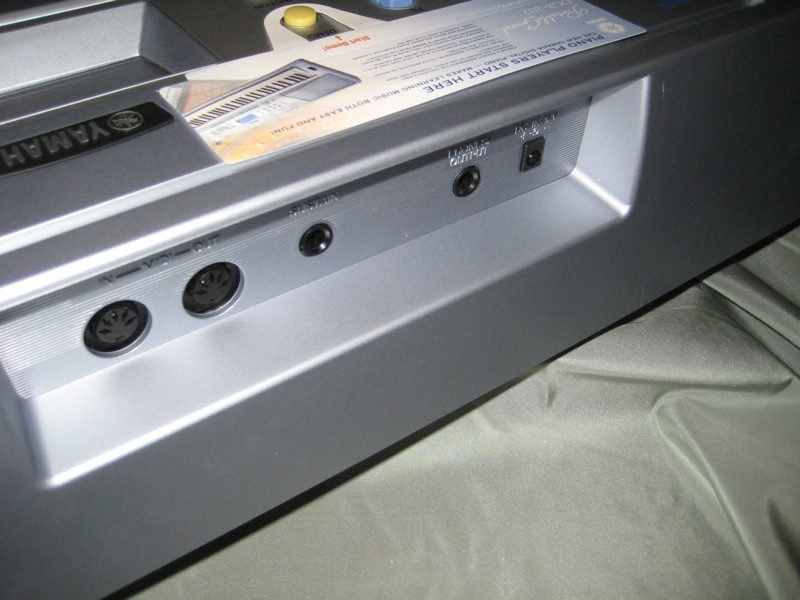
The rear panel for this Yamaha DGX-202 electronic keyboard shows a typical 1/4" input jack for a sustain pedal (third from left).

More sophisticated and expensive electronic keyboards and sound modules may have Musical Instrument Digital Interface (MIDI) support for a range of user-selected articulations, and the keyboard itself may have an assignable jack or multiple jacks. Standard MIDI continuous controller (CC) messages that users can select for pedals include: CC 64 (sustain pedal, the most commonly used option); CC 65 (portamento); CC 66 (sostenuto pedal); CC 67 (soft pedal); CC 68 (legato pedal); and CC 69 ("hold 2 pedal"). Some such keyboards, such as the Nord Stage, also include a jack for an expression pedal.
