= Action (piano) =

Piano mechanism

The piano action mechanism (also known as the key action mechanism or simply the action) of a piano or other musical keyboard is the mechanical assembly which translates the depression of the keys into rapid motion of a hammer, which creates sound by striking the strings. Action can refer to that of a piano or other musical keyboards, including the electronic or digital stage piano and synthesizer, on which some models have "weighted keys", which simulate the touch and feel of an acoustic piano. The design of the key action mechanism determines the "weight" of the keys, i.e., the force required to sound a note or striking power. "A professional pianist is likely to care most about the piano's action, because that is what controls its responsiveness and relative lightness--or heaviness--of touch. Roughly speaking, a piano's action is light when its keys fall easily under the fingers, and heavy when a noticeable downward thrust is required. The action, in short, is what makes a piano playable or not to an individual musician."

== History ==
The string hammer action was the important innovation that Bartolomeo Cristofori created when he invented the pianoforte; Cristofori is credited with building his first instrument by 1700. Although similar hammer actions were devised at about the same time by Marius (1716) and Christoph Gottlieb Schröter (1717), Cristofori was the only one of these three to actually construct an instrument. Alfred Dolge notes the first pianos were quite similar in construction to contemporary harpsichords, while incorporating key features of the clavichord, including the soundboard, metal strings, and percussive-string method of creating sounds.

With the piano, a hammer strikes the string, whereas with a harpsichord, a mechanism plucks the string. Cristofori's improved escapement action (1720) embodied many of the principles still found in 2000-era actions. It used levers to magnify the small motion of the piano key into a large motion of the hammer, and was arranged so that the very last part of the hammer's motion before striking the string would be purely the result of inertia and not propelled by the key; this prevents the key from pressing the felt-covered hammer firmly into the string, which would damp and stop the string vibrations and the sound.

=== Horizontal (grand) actions ===
'English' pianoforte actions

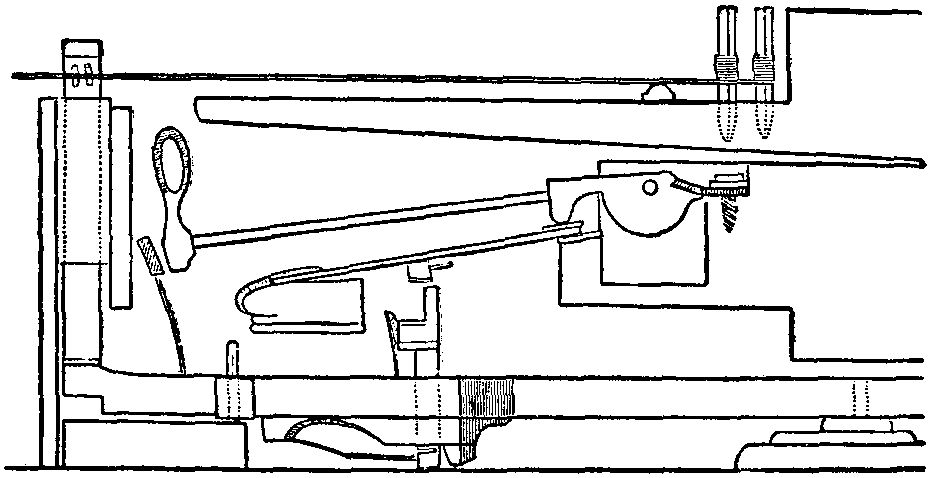
Cristofori escapement (1720)

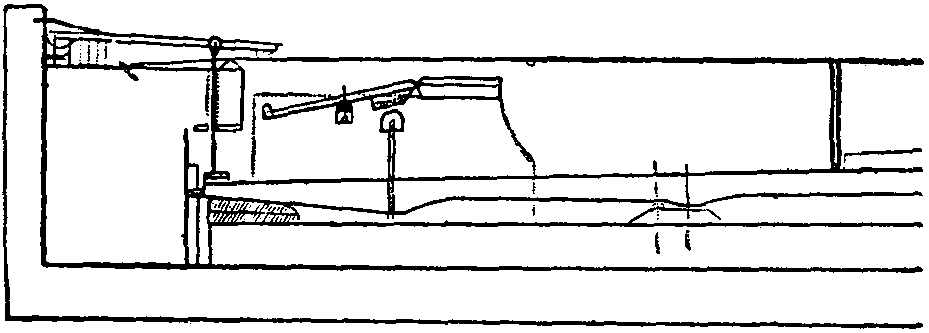
Zumpe (1760s)

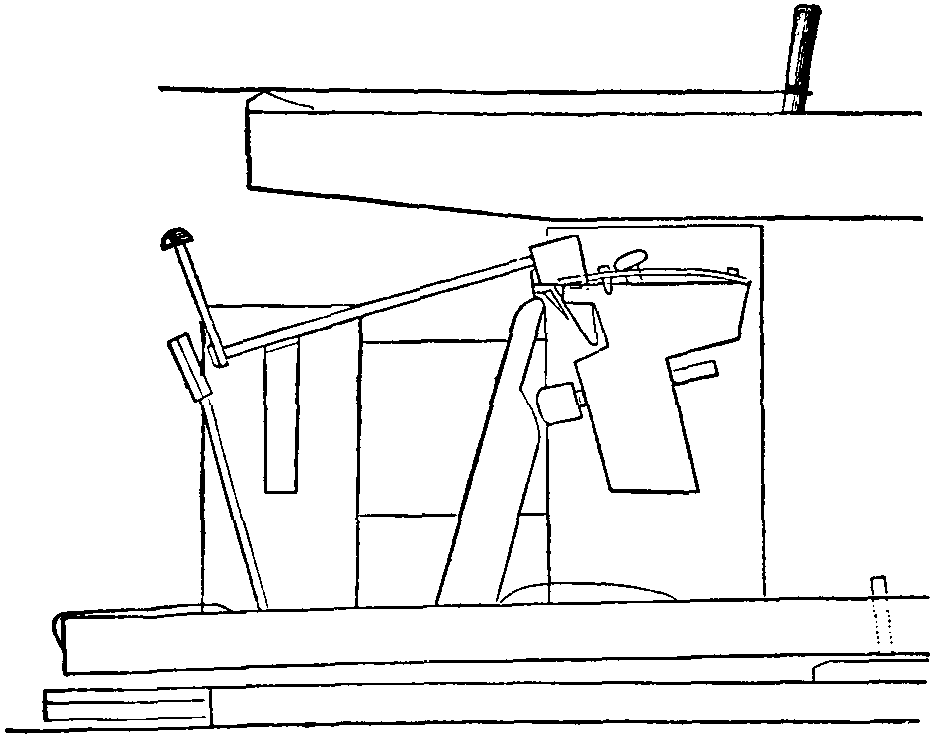
Backers (1776)

In Cristofori's improved escapement action (1720), when the key is depressed, the other end of the key-lever raises a horizontal hopper (which Cristofori called the linguetta mobile) with a stepped projection; the hopper raises the curved hammer butt. Because of the stepped projection, the hopper slips off the key just before the hammer strikes the string, providing the escapement action. Other modern features are apparent in his diagram, including the presence of a back check to facilitate repetition, and using the rising tip of the key-lever to lift the damper.

Cristofori died in 1731 and left no significant pupils; the instruments that were in process were finished by Giovanni Ferrini, who also is credited with building a pianoforte dated to 1730. However, Gottfried Silbermann built pianos with both Cristofori and Schröter actions. Silbermann produced Schröter action pianos as early as 1728; Silbermann also built two Cristofori action pianos which were submitted to Johann Sebastian Bach; according to Bach's pupil Johann Friedrich Agricola, Bach rejected them for having a weak treble and heavy action, and Silbermann did not build more Cristofori action pianos for two decades, when he built several for Frederick the Great in 1747.

Two of Silbermann's pupils, Johannes Zumpe and Americus Backers, popularized the Cristofori action as the "English" action after moving to London. Zumpe introduced the square piano between 1760 and 1765; Alfred James Hipkins called Zumpe's action "rudimentary but efficient". The pianos built by Backers did not survive, but his action, patented in 1776, was refined by Robert Stodart (1777) and John Broadwood (1780); the resulting "English" action was noted by Hipkins as "the best single escapement action". Perhaps the best-known English piano action of the nineteenth century is the Brooks action of 1810.

'German' & 'Viennese' pianoforte actions

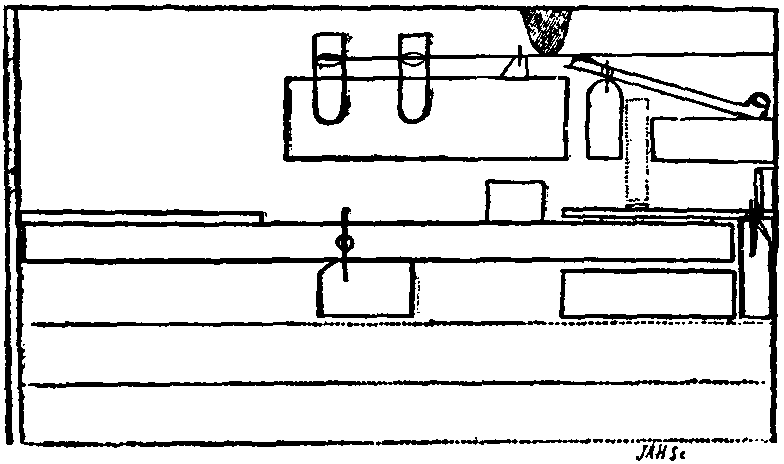
Schröter (1717)

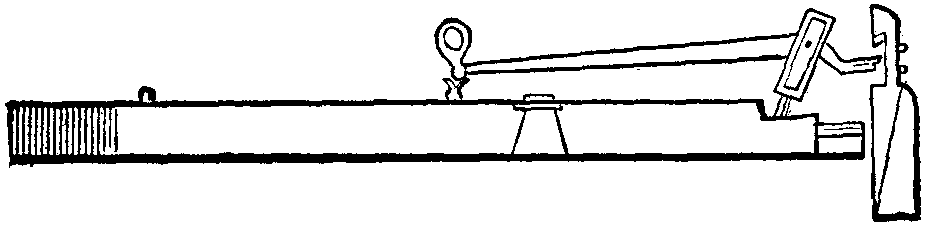
Stein (1770s)

Silbermann also was responsible for popularizing the Schröter or "German" action. Dolge characterizes Schröter's original action as "a model of innocent simplicity ... a clumsy device [that] made the touch hard and tough"; Silbermann improved the escapement of the original design. One of Silbermann's pupils, the Augsburg builder Johann Andreas Stein, further refined Schröter's action in the 1770s by reversing the orientation of the hammer, with the hammer head closer to the player. As described by Hipkins, in the original "Viennese" action, "the blow is caused by the depression of the key raising the hammer-butt until the back of it comes in contact with a rail at the back of the keyboard, the result being to jerk the hammer to the string". Stein also refined this action by adding an escapement. This "Viennese" action continued to be developed by Stein's daughter, Nannette Streicher, and was widely used by other makers in Vienna, and was the action of pianos played by Haydn, Mozart, and Beethoven, as it was characterized by a "pleasant light elastic touch and [a] charming musical quality of tone". It survived in Viennese pianos almost to the end of the 19th century.

Slow-motion video of modern grand piano action (0:03)

In the 19th century, the English action was further modified by French builders, notably in the invention of the repetition lever, which facilitated rapidly repeating notes. Sébastien Érard invented the double-escapement action which incorporated the repetition lever, patented in 1808 and 1821; Dolge credits Érard with combining the refined touch of the Vienna action with the force and power of the English action. The 2000s-era grand piano action is a distant descendant of Cristofori's original.

One of the most well-known French piano actions was created by Jean Schwander in 1844 and improved upon by his son-in-law Josef Herrburger; the Schwander action is still used in Bechstein pianos. At the turn of the century, Schwander-Herrburger merged with Brooks, giving us the Herrburger-Brooks piano action, which was the definitive piano action of the twentieth century. Throughout the history of the action, piano makers tended to make it heavier and sturdier, in response to the increasing size, weight, and robustness of the instrument, which was itself part of a general demand for a more powerful sound.

=== Vertical (upright) actions ===
Upright piano actions

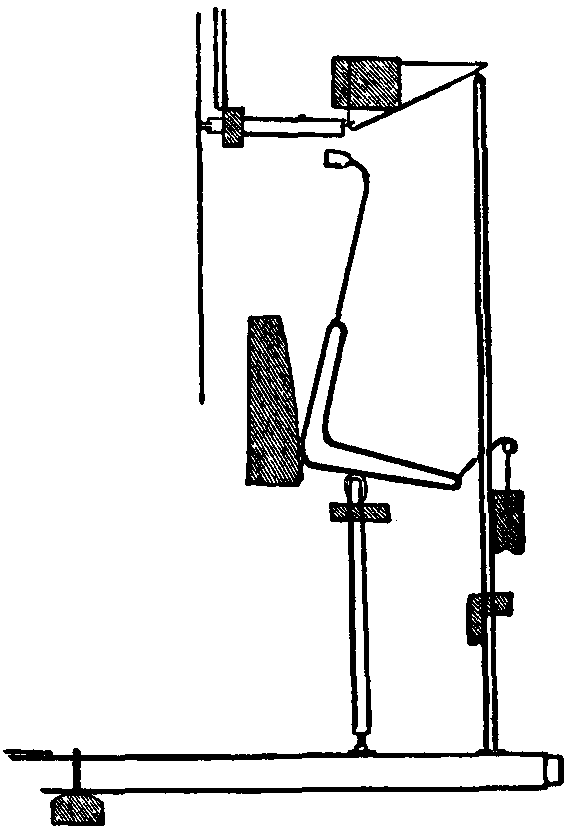
Friederici (1745)

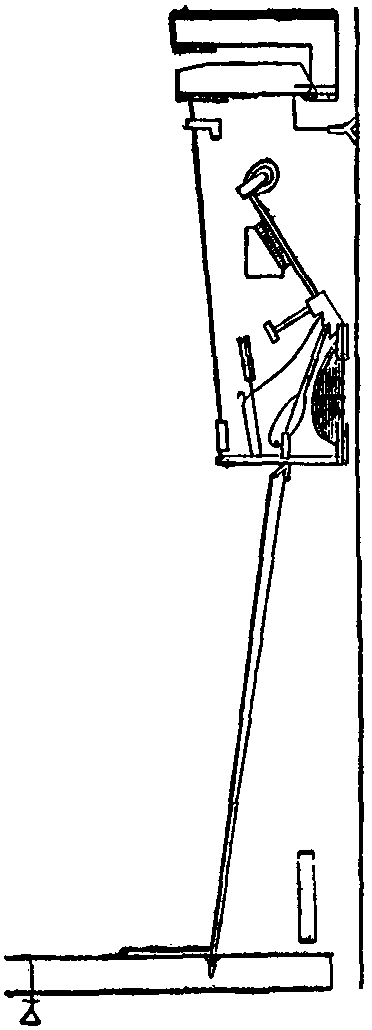
Wornum (1826)

Christian Ernst Friederici invented the first upright piano action in 1745, but it was not well-regarded; Hipkins likened it to a Nuremberg clock. The first upright piano was built by Johann Schmidt in 1780, and improvements were made by various engineers and inventors in the early 1800s, including John Isaac Hawkins, but it was not accepted as a proper musical instrument until 1826, with the introduction of Robert Wornum's upright piano action, which has continued with few changes to the modern upright. Ignaz Pleyel adopted Wornum's action and it is popularly known as the Pleyel action.

=== Electronic keyboard actions ===
Manufacturers of electronic keyboards, synthesizers, and digital pianos have used various designs to recreate the feel of an acoustic piano. The simplest electronic keyboards, sometimes known as synth-action, use springs to restore each key to its resting position, similar in concept to a computer keyboard, but providing the least realism. More sophisticated keyboards incorporate weights in the keys but rely on springs for return, making these semi-weighted keyboards fast to depress and slower to return.

Keyboards that use moving weights similar to the motion of hammers without relying on springs are called hammer-action. The hammer weights may vary by the note being played, similar to how keys in the bass register of the piano have heavier hammers to sound the thicker strings than those in the treble register; these are known as progressive hammer-action keyboards. Many electronic keyboards use keys that are hinged at the back to minimize keybed depth; some use keys that pivot in the middle or have longer pivot arms with higher-end keybeds, similar to acoustic pianos.

== Examples ==
The action primarily serves to mechanically amplify a relatively small (key) movement into a longer, faster (hammer) movement. As an overview, when a key is depressed, a felt hammer strikes one or more strings, causing them to vibrate. The vibrations are transmitted to the soundboard, which makes the audible note. The action also automatically retracts the hammer after it strikes the string(s), preventing it from damping their vibration. In addition, as long as the key is depressed, the action also lifts a felt damper off the appropriate string(s), sustaining the vibration.

The main difference between grand and upright piano actions is the direction of motion. In the grand piano, the soundboard is horizontal; the hammer rises and strikes the string(s) from below, and gravity is used to restore the damper and hammer to their resting positions. In an upright piano, the soundboard is vertical; the hammer strikes the string(s) from the side, and a combination of gravity and springs are used to restore the damper and hammer to their resting positions. The key feel when playing repeated notes is slightly different on these actions, as a result.

Traditionally, the individual parts of the action of an acoustic piano are made of wood with metal pins and pivots; some manufacturers have switched to using plastic and composite materials for certain items to add strength and environmental stability.

=== Modern grand action ===
1. Key; 2. Capstan; 3. Wippen; 4. Letoff button; 5. Jack; 6. Hammer flange screw; 7. Drop screw; 8. Hammer shank; 9. Repetition lever; 10. Hammer; 11. Back check; 12. Damper lever; 13. Damper tray; 14. Spoon; 15. Damper; 16. String; 17. Plate; 18. Agraffe; 19. Tuning pin; 20. Pin block

The key (1) is comparable to a seesaw; when the player depresses one end, the end on the other side of the pivot point rises. The capstan (2) is on the rising side of the key. The rising capstan lifts the wippen (3), which is connected to the L-shaped jack (5). The rising wippen carries the long end of the jack, which pushes on a felt knuckle near the pivot point of the hammer shank (8), causing the felt-covered hammer (10) to rise and strike the string(s) (16).

Simultaneously, the rising end of the key also lifts the spoon (14), which is connected to a felt block called the damper (15), which normally rests on the string(s), preventing vibrations. With the damper lifted, the string(s) vibrate after the hammer has struck them.

The short end of the jack is tripped by the letoff button (4) just before the moment the hammer strikes the string(s), causing the long end of the jack to slip off the knuckle; the hammer continues to rise and strike the string(s) by inertia, but then the hammer rebounds and falls back down. In this way, the felt hammer is prevented from dampening the vibrations after striking the string(s), as it would if it remained in contact with the string(s).

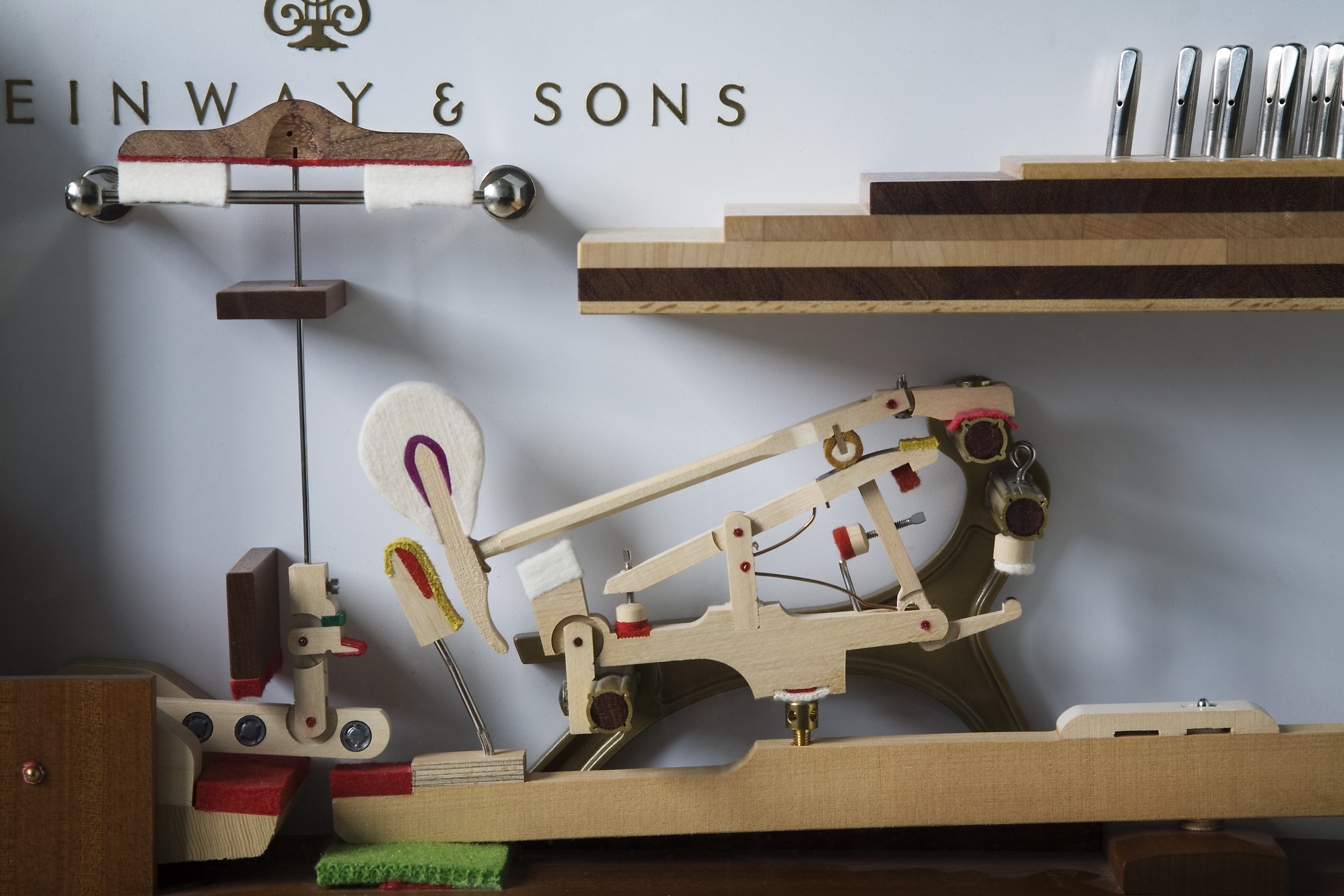
Demonstration grand piano action of a single key

If the key remains depressed, the hammer is held above its initial resting position by the back check (11), which is on the same (rising) side of the key as the capstan; this facilitates rapid repetition of notes without fully returning the key to rest, as the repetition lever (9) raises the hammer shank far enough to reset the long end of the jack back under the hammer knuckle for additional key strikes.

When the key is released, the damper falls back to its resting position, silencing the note. The damper pedal, also known as the sustain pedal, lifts the damper tray (13), which raises all of the dampers simultaneously, causing the notes to be sustained even after the keys are released.

=== Modern upright action ===
1. Pin block; 2. Tuning pin; 3. Agraffe; 4. Mechanical support; 5. String; 6. Damper; 7. Damper arm; 8. Hammer butt; 9. Main rail; 10. Lifting bar; 11. Spoon; 12. Key; 13. Capstan; 14. Wippen; 15. Jack arm; 16. Letoff button; 17. Jack; 18. Back check; 19. Catcher; 20. Hammer rail; 21. Hammer

Similar to the grand action, in an upright, when the player depresses one end of the key (12), the end on the other side of the pivot point rises. The capstan (13) is on the rising side of the key. The rising capstan lifts the wippen (14), which is connected to the L-shaped jack (17). The rising wippen and jack push on the hammer butt (8) near the pivot point of the hammer shank, causing the felt-covered hammer (21) to move toward and strike the string(s) (5). The hammer is normally held away from the string(s) by a spring near its pivot and the hammer butt.

The mechanism to move the damper off the string(s) for the upright action differs from the grand action. In the upright action, the wippen has a pivot on the main rail (9); as the jack end of the wippen rises for the hammer strike, the other end of the wippen falls, pushing the connected spoon (11) toward the string(s). The moving spoon in turn pushes on the damper arm (7), which also pivots on the main rail, lifting the connected damper (6) from the string(s); the damper is held in place normally by a spring on the damper arm, preventing vibrations.

With the damper lifted, the string(s) vibrate after the hammer has struck them; since the felt hammer itself would dampen these vibrations if it remains in contact with the string(s), the short end of the jack, called the jack toe or jack arm (15) is tripped by the letoff button (16) just before the moment the hammer strikes the string(s), causing the jack to slip off the hammer butt; the hammer continues to strike the string(s) through inertia, then rebounds and falls back. If the key remains depressed, the hammer is held above its initial resting position by the catcher (19), which rests on the back check (18), which is on the same (rising) side of the wippen as the jack; this facilitates rapid repetition of notes, although with a different feel than in a grand piano action. The return motion of the hammer as it rebounds from the string(s) is assisted by the catcher and bridle, which is a flexible strap (generally leather) connecting the catcher to the wippen; the bridle adds the weight of the wippen to the hammer to help the hammer return to the back check.

When the key is released, the damper is restored to its resting position by a spring, silencing the note, and the hammer returns to its initial resting position on the hammer rail (20). If the damper or sustain pedal is depressed, that action lifts a bar (10), which moves all of the dampers off the strings simultaneously, causing notes to be sustained even after the keys are released.

=== Zumpe (English) action ===
1. Key; 2. Jack; 3. Rear guide; 4. Hammer; 5. Damper jack; 6. Damper; 7. Damper spring

The Zumpe action, as fitted to his square pianos from c. 1765, is fairly straightforward: as the key (1) is depressed, the rising end of the lever raises the leather-covered jack (2), also known as the "old man's head". This in turn lifts the hammer, which is hinged using a leather strap, to strike the string(s) above it. Simultaneously, the damper (6) is lifted from the string(s) by the damper jack (5), also known as the "mopstick".

=== Viennese grand action ===
1. Key; 2. Back check; 3. Hammer; 4. Pin block; 5. Tuning pin; 6. Agraffe; 7. String; 8. Damper guide rail; 9. Damper weights; 10. Damper; 11. Connecting wire; 12. Damper guide; 13. Leather hinge; 14. Damper common rail; 15. Spring slide wire; 16. Hopper; 17. Hammer butt; 18. Forks; 19. Damper capstan; 20. Transfer wire; 21. Hammer shank

In the Viennese action, when the player depresses one end of the seesaw-like key (1), the end on the other side of the pivot point rises, lifting the fork (18). The end of the hammer butt (17) is constrained by the hopper (16), so as the fork rises, the hammer shank (21) effectively pivots at the hammer butt and the hammer (3) is raised toward and strikes the string(s) (7).

Simultaneously, the rising end of the key also lifts the damper capstan (19), which is connected via the transfer wire (20) to a felt block called the damper (10), which normally rests on the string(s), preventing vibrations. With the damper lifted, the string(s) vibrate after the hammer has struck them.

Since the felt hammer itself would dampen these vibrations if it remains in contact with the string(s), a hammer escapement is provided by the notched rising end of the key, which engages with a structure analogous to the letoff button just before the hammer strikes the string. This letoff button is attached to the hopper, which is hinged and held in place normally by the spring slide wire (15). The rising end of the key tilts the hopper against the spring, towards the rear of the piano, causing the hopper to disengage from the hammer butt; the hammer continues to rise until it strikes the string(s), then it rebounds and falls back down. If the key remains depressed, the hammer is held above its initial resting position by the back check (2); this facilitates rapid repetition of notes.

When the key is released, the damper falls back to its resting position, silencing the note, and the hammer returns to its initial resting position. The damper guide rail (8) is lifted by the damper pedal, allowing multiple sustained notes.

=== Upright action circa 1907 ===
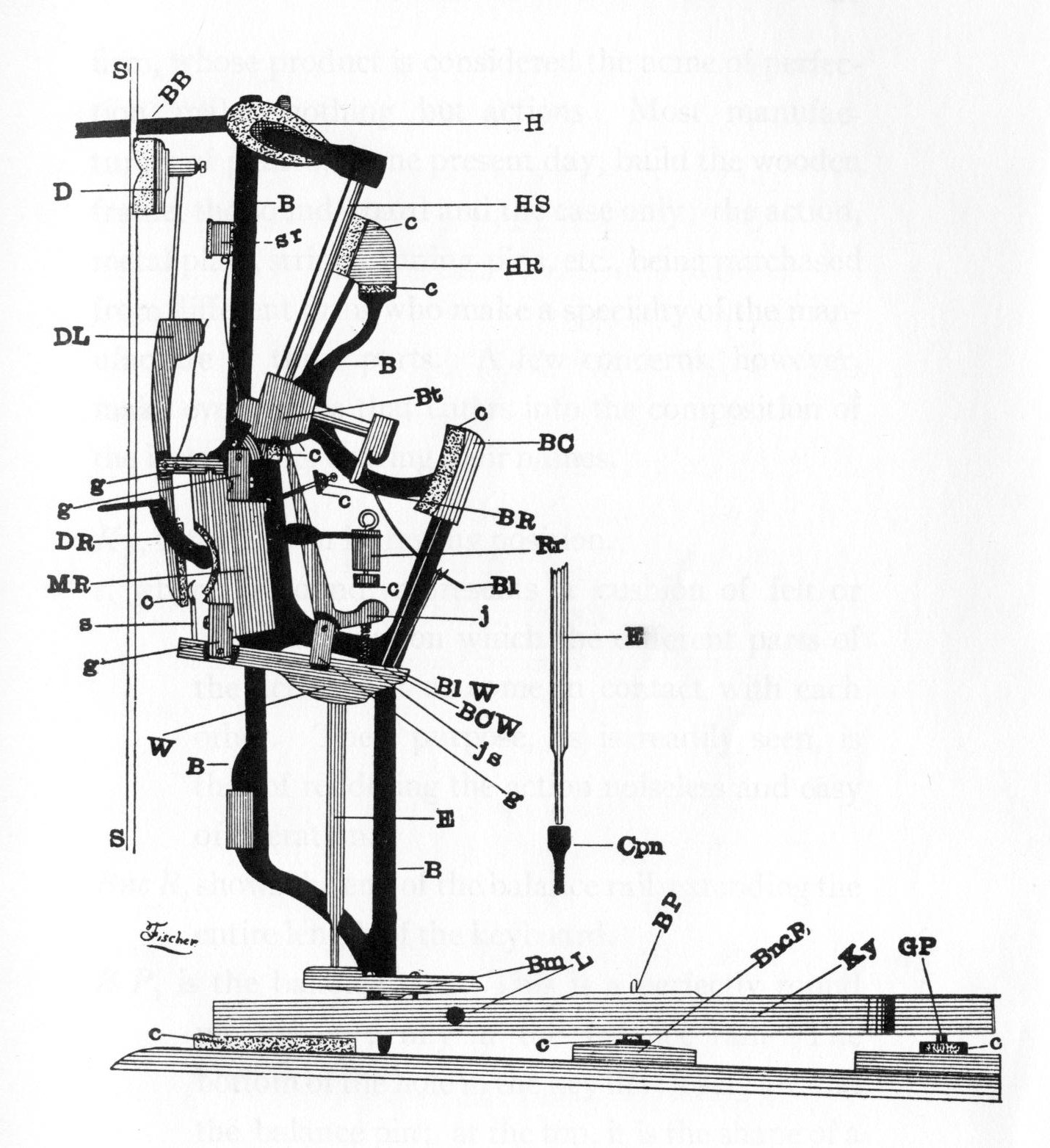
Action of a circa 1907 upright piano

The action mechanism of a key consists of the key itself and all its appurtenances. These appurtenances include a see-saw like leverage-system, the escapement, a supplementary device for repetition, and a check for hammer rebound.

The illustration to the right is of a circa 1907 Wessell, Nickel and Gross upright action; the parts are listed below.

==== Parts of the keys and keybed ====
Ky, is the key in its resting position.

c, found in multiple places, represents a cushion of felt or soft leather upon which the different parts of the action rest or come in contact with each other. Their purpose is that of rendering the action noiseless and easy of operation.

Bnc R, shows the end of the balance rail, underneath the keys and extending the entire length of the keyboard.

B P, is the balance pin. This is a perfectly round pin driven firmly in the balance rail. The bottom of the hole in the key fits closely around the balance pin; at the top, it is the shape of a mortise, parallel with the key, which allows the key to move only in the direction intended. The mortise in the wooden cap on top of the key at this point is lined with bushing cloth which holds the key in position laterally, and prevents looseness and rattling, yet allows the key to move easily.

L, is the lead weight inserted in this portion of the key, which serves three purposes: to balance it, to ensure uniformity of "touch", and to ensure quick and certain return of key to its rest position. As each key may vary in length and weight, and each hammer also may vary in weight, some keys are leaded much more heavily than others. In some cases the lead is inserted in the extreme back end of the key; in others it is put near the balance rail according to the requirement. In some actions the lead is omitted entirely; but in the best actions it is almost invariably present. In the action of the grand piano the keys are leaded in front of the balance rail instead of back of it. This is because, in the grand piano, the hammer rests in a horizontal position and its whole weight must be actually lifted and the force of gravity overcome, while in the upright, the hammer rests in a vertical position, only requiring to be thrown forward.

G P, is the guide pin, generally of oval shape, with the longest diameter in line with the key. The hole in the lower portion of the key, in which the guide pin works, is bushed with bushing cloth and is made to fit so closely that the key will not move laterally, yet not so tightly that the key will not work easily.

Bm, is a wooden block called the bottom; sometimes called the key-rocker. It is held in position by the two screws shown in cut by which it can be adjusted or regulated. When the key is depressed by the player, the bottom rises, as it is on the opposite side of the pivot pin.

==== Hammer mechanism and escapement ====
E, is the extension communicating the motion of the key to the upper part of the action. There are various ways in which the extension is connected to the bottom. In this action, the extension is made round at the lower end and fits snugly into a hole in the bottom upon a felt disc. When the action is taken out, the extensions simply lift out of the holes, and when it is put back it is necessary to insert each one in its place. In other actions, the upper side of the bottom where the extension rests has no hole but simply a felt covering upon which the extension rests; in this case it is necessary to provide what is called an extension guide which is hinged to the extension guide rail shown in the cut at the left of the extension. In actions of this kind, the extensions remain in place at all times and the trouble of placing them properly on the bottom when replacing the action is obviated. Other methods also are employed which are readily understood upon slight examination, but are essentially similar to the above. Instead of the bottom, a capstan screw is used in some actions as follows:

Cpn, is a capstan screw used in some actions in place of the bottom. It is turned by inserting a pointed instrument in one of the four holes, thus raising or lowering the capstan in regulating. The lower end of the extension is felted. In such actions the extension is invariably provided with the extension guide.

B, is the metal action bracket. The bracket is one solid piece of metal. There are generally four brackets in the upright action. The brackets rest on supports in and at the sides of the keybed, and are secured at the top by large bolts (BB).

BB, are the bolts which go through the metal plate and into the wooden frame or pin block. At the top of each bracket is an opening to receive this bolt and a thumbscrew (not shown in the cut, being behind the hammer) which fastens the action securely in position.

M R, is the main rail; so called because the main constituents of the action are attached to it. (Everything designated as "rail" in the action runs the entire length of the action in one solid piece.)

W, is the wippen. Those pieces upon which or by which the small letter g is shown are the flanges. The one at the left of the wippen is called the wippen flange. It is made fast to the main rail by a screw, and upon it the wippen is hinged by means of a "center-pin" at the lower end. The center-pin in the wippen is driven through a hole in which it fits tightly and immovably in the middle part, and it (the center-pin) is consequently stationary in the wippen. The flange extends down at the sides of the wippen and the holes in flange are made large enough to receive bushing cloth in which the center-pin works freely but not loosely. All flange joints are of this nature; some, however, are provided with a means for tightening the center-pin in the middle portion of the joint.

j, is the jack. The purpose of the jack is to communicate the motion of the wippen to the hammer. The precise adjustment of the jack and the adjacent parts upon which it depends for its exact movements, play an important part in regulating the "touch" of the piano.

js, jack spring. Its purpose is to hold the jack inward against the "nose" or "heel" of the hammer butt. (See Bt, hammer butt.)

Rr, regulating rail. The regulating button is shown attached to the rail by the regulating screw which is turned by means of its ring on top of Rr. The purpose of the regulating button is to throw the point of the jack out of the nose of the hammer butt, and allow the hammer to rebound from the string. If the button is too high, it does not throw or trip the jack in time to prevent blocking. When the button is too low, it disengages too soon, and much of the force of the key is lost before it reaches the hammer.

BR, is the block rail, felted on the side next to the jack which strikes against it when thrown from nose. This rail is absent in some actions, in which case the back of the jack is felted and strikes against the "back catch", which is also felted on inner side. (The back catch has no mark in the cut, but is explained below in connection with the "back check".)

BC, is the back check which is simply a piece of wood with a thick piece of felt glued to the inner face and suspended on a wire.

BCW, back check wire supporting the back check, and screwed to the wippen. The purpose of the back check is to check the hammer by coming in contact with the "back catch" (the backward projection of the butt), at a short distance from the string in its return, and prevent the hammer from falling entirely back to its rest position, thereby preventing quick repetition.

Bl, bridle. This is a piece of tape about an eighth of an inch wide with a piece of leather glued to the end and a hole near the end for the point of the "stirrup" or bridle wire. The cut shows where the bridle is fastened in the hammer butt by being put into the hole in the butt, and the back catch stem covered with glue and driven in by it which precludes all possibility of its coming loose. The bridle passes through a hole in the lower part of the back catch. Its purpose is to assist the hammer to return quickly by hanging to it with the weight of the wippen, extension, jack, etc., when the key is released. Thus the bridle becomes the main factor in the matter of quick repetition.

Bl W, bridle wire, screwed into wippen, bent in the shape of a buckle at top to hold bridle.

==== Hammer ====
Bt, butt; or, more specifically, hammer butt. In some cheap actions the butt is joined to its flange g, by the means described under the head of wippen flange; but in this action the center-pin is held firmly in the butt by a small strip of brass containing a set screw; somewhat obscure in the cut, but discernible. All center-pins turn in the flange and not in the middle part.

HS, hammer shank in rest position.

H, hammer showing wood body or head, and covering of two layers of felt.

H R, hammer rail, resting on felt cushion, c, glued to rail or bracket. The hammer rail is held in position by the rod, shown under the hammer shank, which is hinged to the bracket at the lower end, and which allows it to be moved forward when the soft pedal is used. The soft pedal communicates with this rail by a rod which moves it forward and thereby shortens the stroke of the hammers and produces a softer tone.

sr, spring rail screwed to the brackets. This rail supports the light wire springs which assist the hammers in returning to rest position.

==== Strings and soundboard ====
S, string.

D, is the damper head secured to the damper wire by a set screw.

DL, damper lever, working in damper flange g, which is screwed to main rail.

s, spoon; so called from its shape. It is screwed into the wippen. When the key is struck, the motion on the wippen throws the spoon forward, pushing the lower end of damper lever forward, and releasing the damper from its contact with the string. The damper is held against the string by the wire spring which is seen running from the damper flange to the top of the damper lever.

DR, damper rod. This is a rod running from the left or bass end of the action to the right as far as the dampers are continued in the treble. It is acted upon by the "loud" or damper pedal, which raises the outer projection, and by being hinged to the main rail about the same height as this projection, the entire rod is thrown outward against the lower ends of the damper levers, releasing all the dampers simultaneously. This being the only office of the right pedal, it is readily seen that this pedal does not increase the loudness, but simply sustains any number of tones struck successively, giving the effect of more volume.

=== Digital piano (hammer action) ===
1. Key; 2. Retaining hook; 3. Base; 4. Cam; 5. Hammer; 6. Hammer weight; 7. Sensor(s); 8. Pivot (for key)

In a typical hammer action keybed for a digital piano, as the key (1) is depressed, a cam (4) underneath the key presses on one end of a hammer (5), lifting the hammer weight (6) on the other end. The sensor(s) (7) in this case are placed to detect the motion of the hammer; sensors may be placed to detect key and/or hammer position, force, and velocity. The shape, size, and weight of the hammer affects the touch of the key, as does the placement of the sensor(s), pivots (8), and the design of the mechanical linkage between the key cam and the hammer. A retaining hook (2) with a cushion is provided so the key does not rise above its resting position.

To make the keybed more compact, many digital keyboards use a pivot point in the rear and hammers underneath the keys, as illustrated. In the interest of replicating the feel of an acoustic grand piano, some electronic keyboards use a longer key, in some cases moving the pivot point to the middle and relocating the hammer weight and sensor above the key.
