= Americus Backers =

Dutch instrument maker

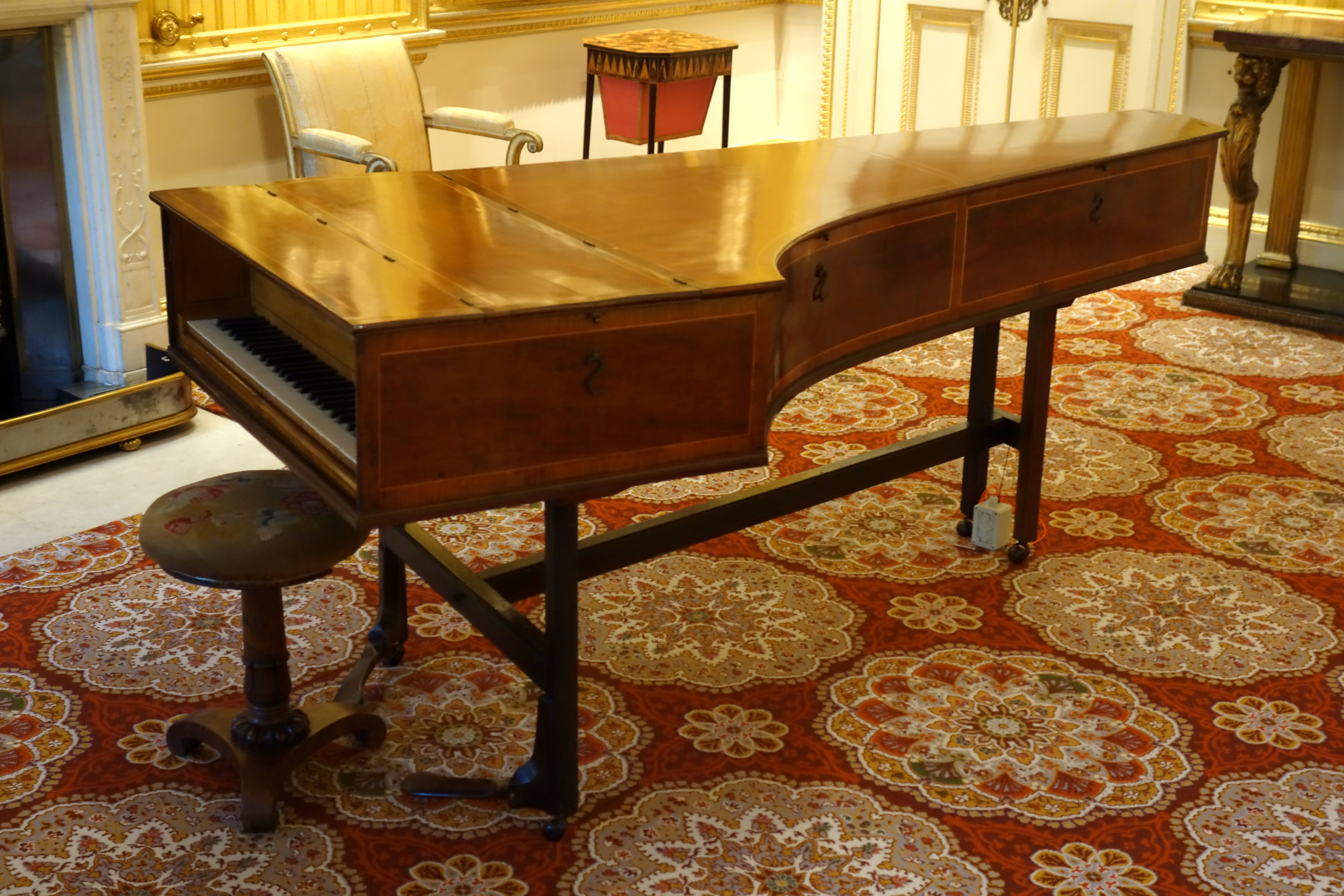
Grand piano by Americus Backers, 1772

Americus Backers (died 1778), sometimes described as the father of the English grand pianoforte style, brought the hammer striking action for keyboard instruments from his master Gottfried Silbermann's workshop in Freiburg to England in the mid-18th century. Unlike the eleven other ex-apprentices of Silbermann who followed him to England and built square pianos with his action, Backers developed Silbermann's action (copied from Cristofori) into a reliable, powerful and responsive form that he built into a grand harpsichord case and added two tonal effects – una corda and damper lift – activated by pedals built into the dedicated trestle stand, again his original innovation. This new instrument altered the landscape of English music, causing composers and musicians to consign the plucked string harpsichord and its music to history.

== Life ==
Contemporary and later sources agree that Americus was of Dutch descent. To date, no chronicler has turned up his record of birth so we can only say that he was born in the early part of the 18th Century. We adduce this because known dates of birth of other apprentices at Silbermann's workshop (such as Johannes Zumpe) are in the 1720s.

Americus migrated to Freiberg, Saxony, apprenticed to organ, harpsichord and piano builder Gottfried Silbermann. The date of Americus's indentures could not be before 1711, the year that Silbermann set up his organ workshop and could equally have been post-1730 by which time the workshop was turning out harpsichords and pianos with Silbermann designed actions in square and in harpsichord cases.

Americus was the first of twelve of Silbermann's apprentices to depart for England. Since we know that Zumpe, next to set up shop in England, arrived in 1756, Americus must have been here before this, yet we have no record of his domicile or trade until 1763 when he took up residence in London's Jermyn Street (with the Anglicized Christian name of Andrew) where, according to the rate books of St. James, Piccadilly, he lived until 1778. A.J. Hipkins in his History of the Pianoforte reports that Americus died in that year but does not give his age.

== His instruments ==
Americus built both harpsichords and pianofortes. He is described by composer, musician and chronicler Charles Burney in Rees's Cyclopaedia for 1772 as "a harpsichord maker of second rank, who constructed several pianofortes, and improved the mechanism in some particulars, but the tone, with all the delicacy of Schroeter's (see below) touch, lost the spirit of the harpsichord and gained nothing in sweetness".

Nevertheless, one of his harpsichords was owned and played by the naturalized English castrato, Giusto Fernando Tenducci, an intimate friend of Johann Christian Bach and an associate of world-renowned castrato Gaspare Pacchierotti, a regular visitor to London between 1778 and 1791. Tenducci published a set of sonatas for the harpsichord or pianoforte not heard since the 18th century. (A recording of one of these pieces exists on a CD by David Leigh playing the actual restored 1766 Backers harpsichord in question.)

A Covent Garden play bill from 1767 amongst the Broadwood family memorabilia dated 16 May for that year announces "End of Act 1. Miss Brickler will sing a favourite song from Judith, accompanied by Mr Dibdin on a new instrument called Piano Forte." There is some speculation that Backers was the maker of this novelty.

Americus announced the first exhibition of this "new Forte Piano" in February 1771. Subsequent Backers pianos were used by J.C. Bach and his protégé Johann Samuel Schroeter for concerto performances in London and would certainly have been known by Muzio Clementi. This was played at the Thatched House in St James's Street, London, in 1773.

Cesare Ponsicchi, a 19th-century piano restorer who had himself worked on original Cristofori pianos, found a Backers grand piano at Pistoria, Italy dated 1778, indicating that Americus's pianos were exported abroad. This piano can no longer be traced.

== Role in development of the grand piano ==
We know from the history of the Broadwood family that John Broadwood and his fellow Scot Robert Stodart – both apprentices to the harpsichord builder Burkat Shudi (Anglicized) – would spend evenings at Americus's Jermyn Street home and workshop, helping him to perfect his escapement for his pianoforte action based on, but differing in several important factors, from Silbermann's design that was in turn developed from Cristofori's original.

Americus's innovation was the addition of an "escapement" to Silbermann's realization of a string striking action design. Unlike Cristofori's design (to which of course Americus had no access) which interposed an intermediate lever between the lever that the key lifts and the striking hammer, Americus placed an upstanding wooden "jack" pivoting from this lever acting directly on a leather clothed notch in the hammer butt. An adjustable screw mounted underneath the hammer flange support rail, known as a "set-off", impacts upon the jack, disengaging it from the hammer which is thus launched into free flight before it strikes its course of strings.

This 'escapement' allows the hammer to fall away from the strings after striking them allowing them to vibrate freely as long as the key is held down producing a long sustained note until the felt damper depending from a lead weighted wooden block is allowed to fall onto the strings by lifting the finger from the key, stilling them and cutting off the note when desired. The hammer head is caught by a "check" – a felt clothed wooden block mounted on the lever by a solid wire. This check is so placed to catch the hammer in a position where the jack can re-engage with the butt to propel it once again towards the strings before the key is fully released. This allows for rapid note repetition common in the ornamentation of music designed to disguise the short duration of treble notes that is typical of the plucked string harpsichord and the early piano whose light, low tension stringing has not the power we expect from a piano of today. (Despite the power and longevity of treble notes in a modern grand, its finely crafted complex action allows up to twenty note repetitions per second, which performance and skill of execution is tested in works such as those of Granados and Albeniz).

Americus fitted his striking action into a harpsichord case whose long bass strings would provide long note duration compared to the square pianos of Zumpe and his contemporaries, showing off a completely new prowess and capability with which musicians and composers could experiment and develop into new forms of keyboard music. (The term Grand Pianoforte for this design was not coined until Robert Stodart patented and used it to adorn the nameplate of a 1777 model bearing his name as manufacturer.)

Americus's other innovation was to mount his instrument on a dedicated three-legged trestle stand. The two front legs of this stand incorporated linkages to the instrument from two pedals. The left pedal when depressed caused the whole keyboard and action to slide to the right against a return spring mounted inside the case. This caused the hammers to strike only one of the strings in its normal trichord and is now generally known as the "una corda". (In Cristofori's original design and in the Viennese pianos of the 18th Century, the una corda was operated by a knee lever since many pianos, like harpsichords, were not supplied with a dedicated stand and might be mounted on a convenient chest or cupboard).

The right hand pedal operated a mechanism that lifted all the dampers away from the strings, Americus's own original idea that was not copied by the Viennese piano makers until much later.

So, in summary, the Backers piano in harpsichord case was the first of what has come to be known as the 18th Century English grand piano. We do not have an exact date for the very first instrument to be offered for sale. Its earliest appearance in public was in 1770 according to John Paul Williams' The Piano, An Inspirational Guide to the Piano and its Place In History.

Following hot on the heels of the Backers instruments came offerings from John Broadwood, succeeding his master, and from Robert Stodart striking out in business on his own. It is quite clear that these and subsequent models by Clementi and other entrants into English piano building are derived directly from Americus's original. Hence the English Grand Pianoforte tradition comes about as a direct result of the prototype Americus Backers.

== Extant instruments ==
=== Harpsichord 1766 ===
Two manual harpsichord in the English style, fully restored to near-original condition (repairs to internal bracing and soundboard) by Laurie Leigh Antiques.

Straight tapering piano-style legs were added in 1830. Photographs of this instrument are located at.

David Leigh has made a recording on CD of two Bach works played on this instrument, in the album Harpsichords: Historic, Rare and Unique Volume 2 – Tenducci's Harpsichord.

=== Pianoforte in harpsichord case 1772 serial number 21 ===
The Russell Collection, St. Cecilia's Hall (University of Edinburgh) There is a photograph of a copy built by Michael Cole in 1960 now in the Cantos Collection at

The instrument shows no evidence of alteration (it was quite common for piano buyers to have their instruments altered, for example to extend their compass with extra notes)

The mahogany case with boxwood cross-banding encloses a wooden frame and soundboard with paper rose. Trichord throughout (there are three strings to each note) Compass is five octaves (FF-f3). Two pedals – una corda and damper lift.

There is a three-legged trestle stand with pedal mechanism for lifting the dampers. This is the first pedal mechanism seen on any keyboard instrument.

The overall dimensions of the instrument – a case length of around 7 feet - allow for long enough strings to give true bass pitch and tone and long enough keys to allow for a delicacy of leverage that offers the player a wide dynamic range (optimum key and string lengths are the reasons for the great length of modern performance quality grand pianos - 275–301 cm).

The instrument's harpsichord pedigree is evident in the shallow 1/4 in key dip one is used to in the harpsichord action instead of the modern piano's 3/8 in. It has a lightness of tone from the narrow-gauge stringing and the duration of string vibration decreases gradually as you progress up the keyboard so that the treble section notes fade quickly, not having the longevity we expect from later pianos. The Backers escapement gives the keys a feeling of lightness and the action a responsiveness that allows for very rapid playing.

These properties, combined with the smoothness and responsiveness of the escapement, encourage the player to adopt a right hand style that majors on scales and ornamentation overlaying sustained bass notes and chords since the hammer action gives the tenor and bass register considerable power, duration and harmonic richness and complexity through each note - tones that cannot be achieved by the string plucking action of a harpsichord.

So the instrument is most suited to transitional music written for the early piano by composers such as Haydn and Mozart who migrated from the harpsichord to the piano during their careers and compositional development. This music retains the right-hand style of the harpsichord, i.e. fast runs and ornaments because treble notes cannot sustain for very long, but innovates with a left hand style that throws over the standard "grounds" in favour of long sustained bass notes and chords that support and harmonize with the melody. Neither the compass nor the sonic performance would suit later works of the 19th Century composers.

That said, it is possible to play some very modern music most successfully on the instrument. For example, Richard Rodney Bennett's book of simple modal pieces The Days of the Week, sounded well on the piano, giving the music the wistful and ethereal quality sought and marked by the composer.

The power of the instrument is incisive enough to fill a large room with an audience. The striking position of the hammers, at around one twelfth of the speaking length of the strings, gives this instrument a thinner and much less harmonically rich sound than a modern piano whose striking point is, for optimum power and tonal richness and complexity, around one seventh of the speaking length. (This optimum striking distance was discovered and standardized by the first John Broadwood before the end of the 18th Century indicating that he possessed an exceptional ear for identifying and eliciting the maximum musical appeal from his instruments bearing in mind that he had no knowledge of, or access to the applied physics and scientific measuring techniques that were more recently used to identify ideals of piano design for the modern era.)

I [???] judge that the surprising qualities of an early English grand pianoforte would have persuaded the 18th Century prospective keyboard instrument purchaser to buy it in preference to a traditional harpsichord and to use the new music written for it to show off its capabilities to envious house guests.

Although the piano is not especially loud at full power, it does show an impressive width of dynamic range compared to the plucked string instrument and it is fully capable of satisfying the original demand that Ferdinando di Medici made of Cristofori – to create an instrument that would, in accompanying his voice at home singing from the popular entertainments of the day mimic the gradual rising crescendo and falling diminuendo volume as well as the power to surprise an audience with the sudden 'snap' of a loud note or chord to contrast with a quieter preceding passage sforzando of an opera house light orchestra.

=== Pianoforte in harpsichord case undated ===
The Benton Fletcher Collection, Fenton House, London (National Trust Properties). The instrument is in the North Attic and, like all the other instruments in the collection it is available for playing to accredited music students by appointment.

I have heard doubts about the authenticity of this instrument. Nevertheless, there is pencilled on the nameboard the legend "AMERICUS BACKERS LONDINI FECIT". There is neither serial number nor date.

The three-legged trestle stand is a reproduction to replace the original (lost in a fire during World War II) and has no pedals. There is a damper lift mechanism within the case.

This piano is similar in many respects of appearance, construction and performance to the instrument in the Russell collection. If it is indeed a Backers it would appear that its maker, having found a winning formula, was not inclined to make changes.

== Bibliography ==
- "Fenton House Hampstead, the National Trust 1978
- Early keyboard Instruments The Benton Fletcher Collection", National Trust 1976
- Harding, Professor Rosamund J., "The Pianoforte, its history traced to the Great Exhibition of 1851", Hechscher & Company
- Hipkins, Alfred J., "The History of the Pianoforte", Scientific American supplement number 385, New York, 19 May 1883, a paper given before the Society of Arts, London
- Kottisck, Edward L., "Early Keyboard Instruments in European Museums", published by George Lucktenburg pp 217, 232
- The Harpsichord and Fortepiano Magazine 414, October 1987, pp 74–85,
- Palmieri, Robert and Margaret W (editors), "Encyclopedia of Keyboard Instruments Vol. 1: The Piano", Garland Reference, Library of the Humanities,- 1131.) New York: Garland Publishing, 1994 and 2004 (Revised) ISBN 0-8240-5685-X
- Reece's Cyclopedia 1772
- Wainwright, David "Broadwood: A Family History"
- Williams, John Paul, "The Piano, an Inspirational Guide to the Piano and its Place in History", pp 21
