= Silent piano =

Type of acoustic piano

A silent piano is an acoustic piano where there is an option to silence the strings by stopping the hammers from striking them. A silent piano is designed for private silent practice.

== Mechanics ==
In all silent systems, engaging the silent function causes a bar to move into place such that it intercepts the hammer shank and stops the hammer from hitting the piano string. Older models detected key movement by using mechanical sensors that affected the touch and produced a clicking sound, whereas newer models use optical sensors that do not affect the feel or sound of the piano.

In more advanced systems, usually on grand pianos, the piano's action is also altered when the silent function is engaged. This changes the action's letoff setting so that the escapement trips at a lower point in the hammer's motion towards the string. This allows the action to be regulated correctly in the non-silent setting. Without it, the action must be regulated to be a compromise between what is needed in non-silent mode and what is needed in silent mode.

== Manufacturers ==
Silent pianos are available from many manufacturers, including Steinway, Bechstein, Bösendorfer, Grotrian-Steinweg, Kawai, Yamaha, Schimmel, Petrof and Seiler. PianoDisc provides systems to be installed ex post.

== See Also ==
Electric piano
