= Soft pedal =

Leftmost piano pedal softening the note

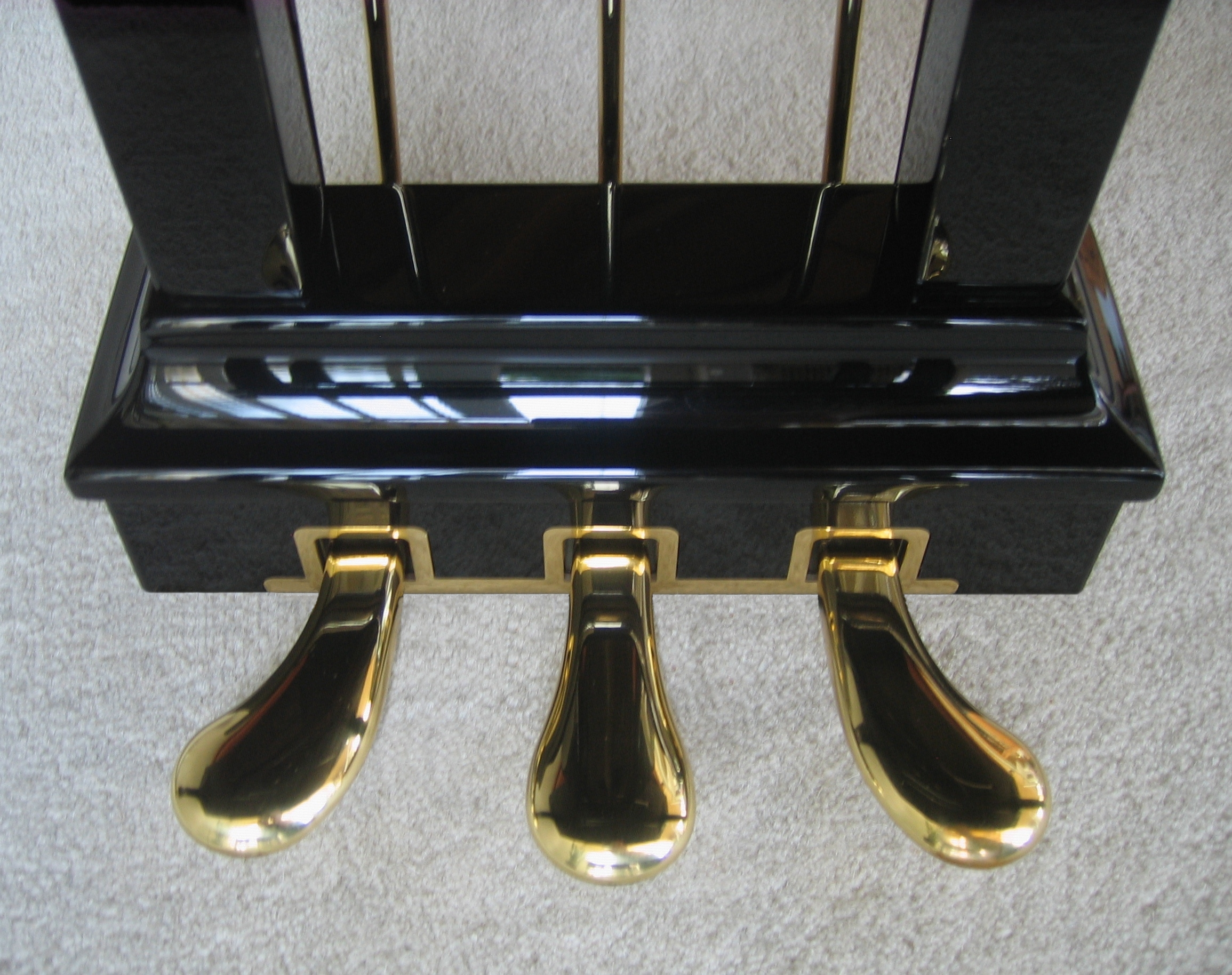
Piano pedals from left to right: soft pedal, sostenuto pedal and sustain pedal

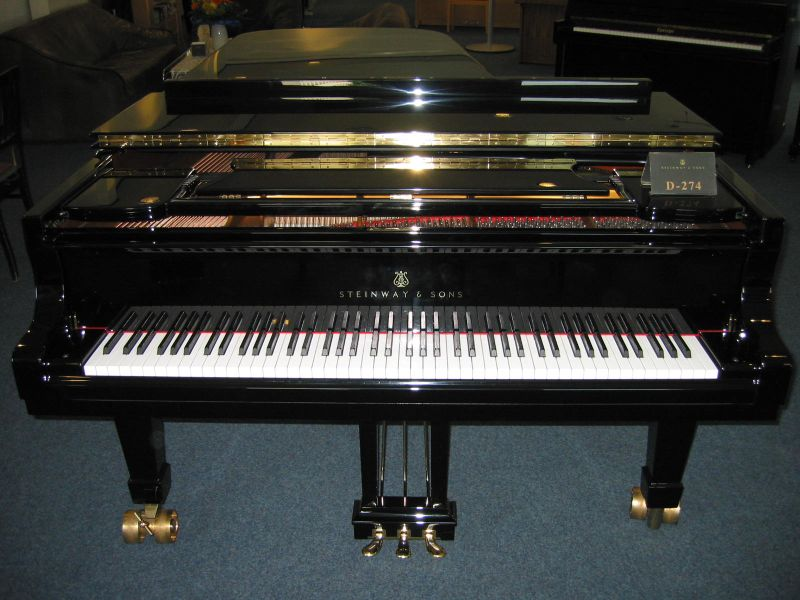
An overview of the piano pedals, which are placed under the keyboard of the piano

The soft pedal, or una corda pedal (Italian for 'one string'), is one of the pedals on a piano, generally placed at the leftmost position. On a grand piano, this pedal shifts the whole action (including the keyboard) slightly to the right, so that the hammers, which normally strike all three strings for a note, strike only two of them. This softens the note and modifies its tone quality. The tone quality is also affected because the remaining two strings that are struck make contact with a part of the hammer felt that is not often hit, since the whole action is shifted. This results in a duller sound, as opposed to the brighter sound usually produced when the felt has been hardened through regular use.

== History ==
The essential function of the soft pedal was invented by Bartolomeo Cristofori, the inventor of the piano. On some of his pianos, it was possible to move the hammer mechanism so that the hammers struck just one of the two strings per note. Cristofori's mechanism was a hand stop, necessitating a free hand for its use. By Mozart's time (see Fortepiano), mechanisms had been invented that permitted the same function to be carried out by a knee lever (located below the keyboard), and in the late 18th century the pedal mechanism familiar to us today was introduced.

In the 18th and early 19th centuries, the piano had evolved to have three strings to most notes. The soft pedal of this time was more effective than today, since it was possible to use it to strike three, two, or even just one string per note—this is the origin of the name una corda (Italian for 'one string'). In modern pianos, the strings are spaced too closely to permit a true "una corda" effect—if shifted far enough to strike just one string on one note, the hammers would also hit the string of the next note.

== Upright and digital pianos ==
On most upright pianos, the soft pedal operates a mechanism that moves the hammers' resting position closer to the strings. Since the hammers have less distance to travel this reduces the speed at which they hit the strings, and hence the volume is reduced, but this does not change tone quality in the way the una corda pedal does on a grand piano. Only a minority of upright pianos have una corda action.

Digital pianos often additionally use this pedal to modify non-piano sounds such as the organ, guitar, or saxophone in ways appropriate to those instruments' playing techniques. Pitch bends, Leslie speaker speed, vibrato, and so forth can thus be controlled in real-time, analogous to the "modulation wheel" on a synthesizer. The pedal is still sometimes called the soft pedal because of its position, but it may have another name like modulation pedal.

== Musical notation ==
The use of the soft pedal is generally notated with the words una corda (Italian for 'one string') or due corde (Italian for 'two strings') to show when the pedal should begin being used, and tre corde or tutte le corde ('three strings' or 'all the strings') for when it should be released. There is discretion for the performer in its use, however, and it can be used when there is no notation when the performer believes its timbre or quietness is called for by the piece.

== Metaphorical usage ==
When used as a verb, soft-pedal refers to the toning down, damping, muting or obscuring of a thing; it means to proceed in a less forceful, circumspect or subdued manner.

David Klavins tunes his una corda piano

The term una corda also applies to modern pianos constructed with only one string per key, as opposed to two or three strings in ordinary pianos. This construction refers to the early times of modern pianos when they evolved from harpsichords.

== See also ==
- Mute (music)
- Sostenuto pedal
- Sustain pedal
