= Sustain pedal =

Foot-operated pedal allowing for free vibration

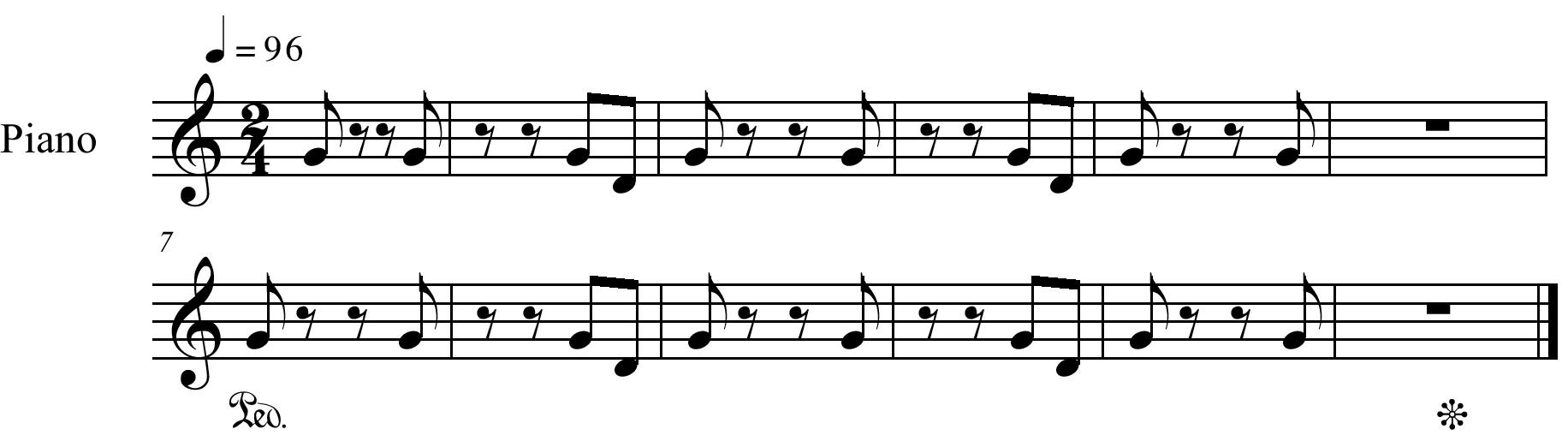
with sustain pedal off (top measures) with sustain pedal on (bottom measures)

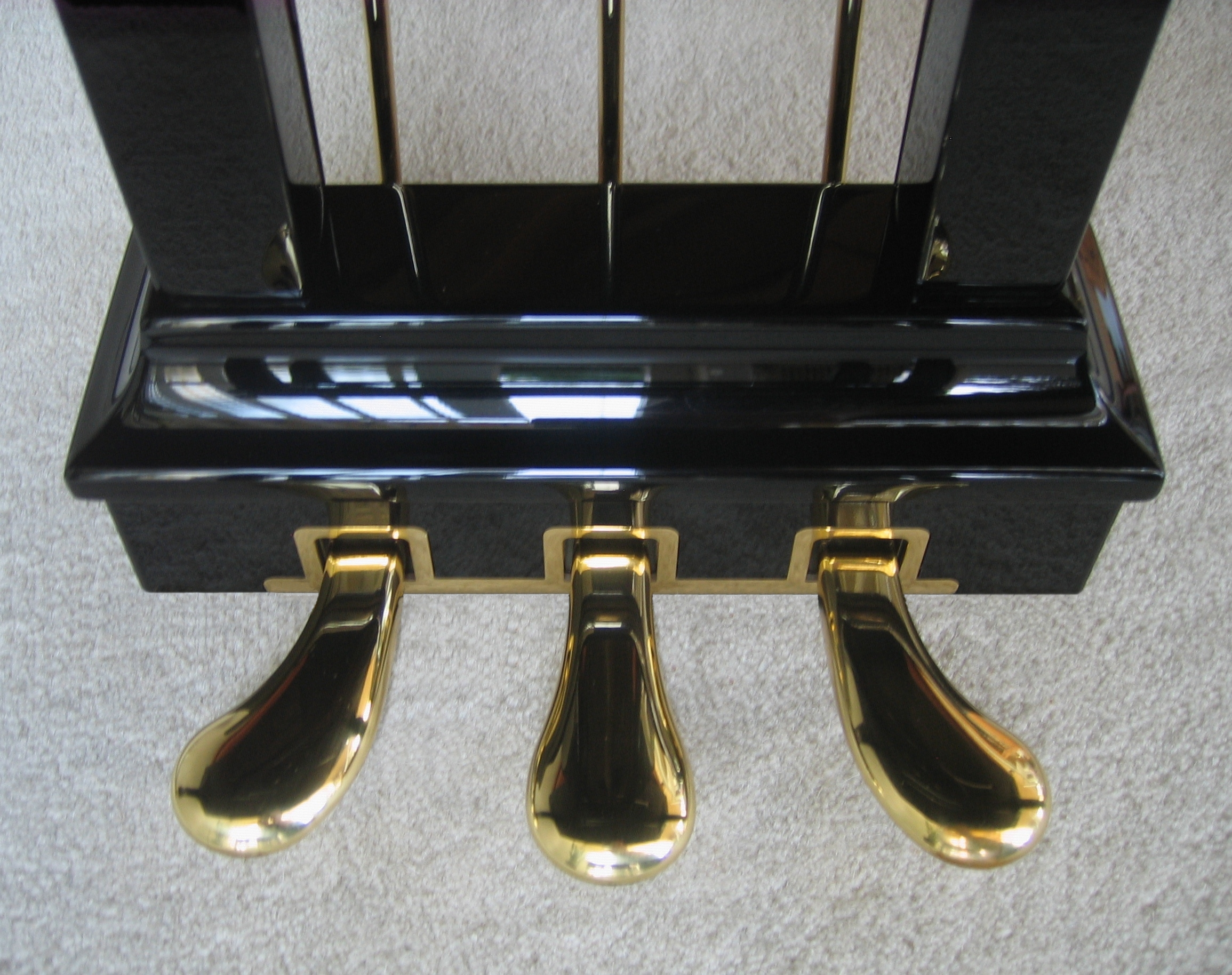
Piano pedals from left to right: soft pedal, sostenuto pedal and sustain pedal

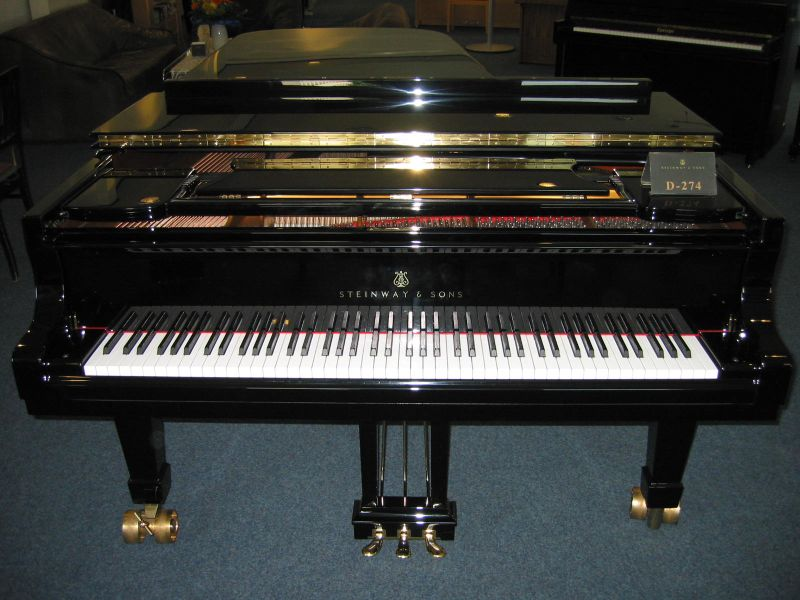
Location of pedals under the keyboard of the grand piano

A sustain pedal is the most commonly used pedal in a modern piano. It is typically the rightmost of two or three pedals. When pressed, the sustain pedal "sustains" all the damped strings on the piano by moving all the dampers away from the strings and allowing them to vibrate freely. All notes played will continue to sound until the vibration naturally ceases, or until the pedal is released.

This lets the pianist sustain notes that would otherwise be out of reach, for instance in accompanying chords, and accomplish legato passages (smoothly connected notes) that would otherwise have no possible fingering. Pressing the sustain pedal also causes all the strings to vibrate sympathetically with whichever notes are being played, which greatly enriches the piano's tone.

== Terminology ==
It is also called a sustaining pedal (also called damper pedal, loud pedal, or open pedal)

== History ==
A device similar to the sustain pedal in effect was invented by the piano pioneer Gottfried Silbermann; it was operated by the player's hands rather than a pedal. A later builder, Johann Andreas Stein, may have been the first to allow the player to lift the dampers while still playing; his device was controlled by a knee lever.

Until the onset of the Romantic era in music, the sustain pedal was considered a special effect, used only in particular circumstances. Only with the Romantics did a fairly constant use of the pedal come to be regarded as an essential element of piano sound.

== Specifying pedaling in musical compositions ==
Appropriate use of the pedal is often left to the musician's discretion, but composers and music editors also use pedal marks to notate it. A common symbol for this is a horizontal line below the grand staff, which lifts up and down with the pedal. An alternative (and older) notation is the use of indicating where the sustain pedal should be depressed, and an asterisk showing where it should be lifted. Occasionally there is a general direction at the start of a movement instructing that the sustain pedal be applied continuously throughout. This may be marked with senza sordini ("without dampers"), or similar wording.

In General MIDI, the sustain pedal information is controlled by Control Change number 64 (CC 64).

== Sostenuto pedal ==
The sostenuto pedal is a similar device that sustains only notes that are depressed at the time the pedal is depressed. It is usually the middle of three pedals; but in some upright pianos the middle pedal instead lowers a veil of felt between the hammers and the strings to function as a mute.

== Half pedaling ==
For mechanical pianos, and simulated on some digital piano pedals, it is possible to press down the sustain pedal only partially such that the dampers just touch the strings very slightly. This technique for the advanced pianist is called half pedaling and allows a fine variation of the sound. It can be observed that with half pedaling the damping is more effective for the higher tones. An example for a musical piece that is played with half pedaling by some pianists is Beethoven's Moonlight Sonata. Most recent digital pianos also support this effect.

== Other instruments ==
- Electronic keyboards often include a sustain pedal, a simple foot-operated switch, which controls the electronic or digital synthesis so as to produce a sustain effect. Several recent models use more sophisticated pedals that have a variable resistance, allowing half pedaling.
- Metallophones such as vibraphones, tubular bells, and high-end glockenspiels have sustain pedals that allow the metal bars to ring.
- The cimbalom has a sustain (or damper) pedal, which allows its strings to ring or abruptly mutes them.

== See also ==
- Soft pedal
- Expression pedal
- Sostenuto
- Mute (music)
