= Gottfried Silbermann =

German instrument builder (1683–1753)

Gottfried Silbermann (January 14, 1683 – August 4, 1753) was a German builder of keyboard instruments. He built harpsichords, clavichords, organs, and fortepianos; his modern reputation rests mainly on the latter two.

== Life ==
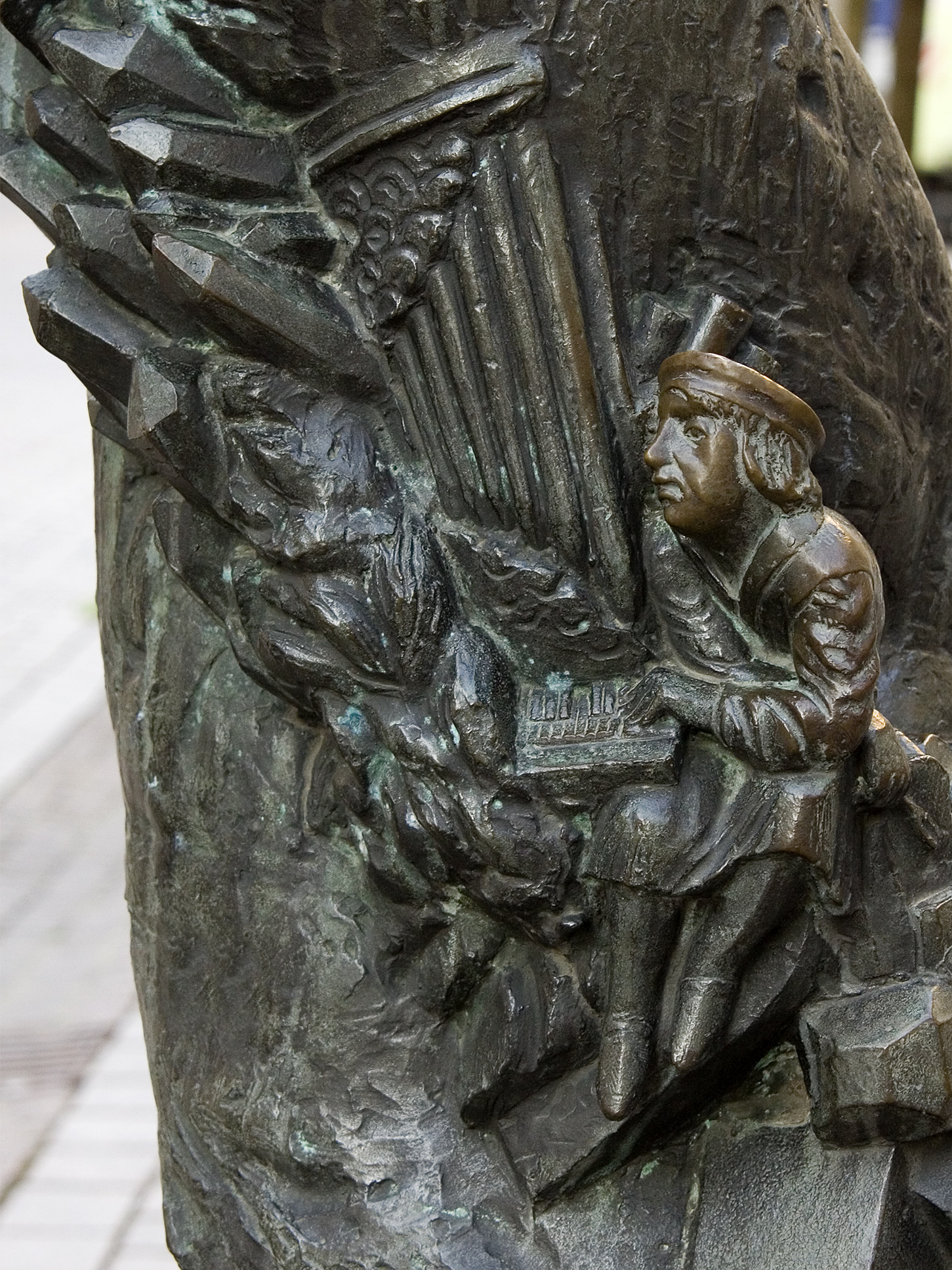
Gottfried Silbermann is commemorated in a sculpted portrait by the 20th century sculptor Bernd Göbel, part of the Fortuna Fountain in Freiberg, Germany, where Silbermann worked

Very little is known about Silbermann's youth. He was born in Kleinbobritzsch (then in the Electorate of Saxony, now a part of Frauenstein, Saxony) as the youngest son of the carpenter Michael Silbermann. They moved to the nearby town of Frauenstein in 1685, and it is possible that Gottfried also learnt carpentry there. He moved to Straßburg in 1702, where he learnt organ construction from his brother Andreas Silbermann and came in touch with the French-Alsatian school of organ construction. He returned to Saxony as a master craftsman in 1710, and opened his own organ workshop in Freiberg one year later. His second project in Germany was the "Grand Organ" in the Freiberg Cathedral of St. Mary, finished in 1714. In 1723 he was bestowed the title Königlich Polnischen und Churfürstlich Sächsischen Hof- und Landorgelmachers ("Honorary Court and State Organ Builder to the King of Poland and Elector of Saxony") by Frederick Augustus I.

== Silbermann's organs ==
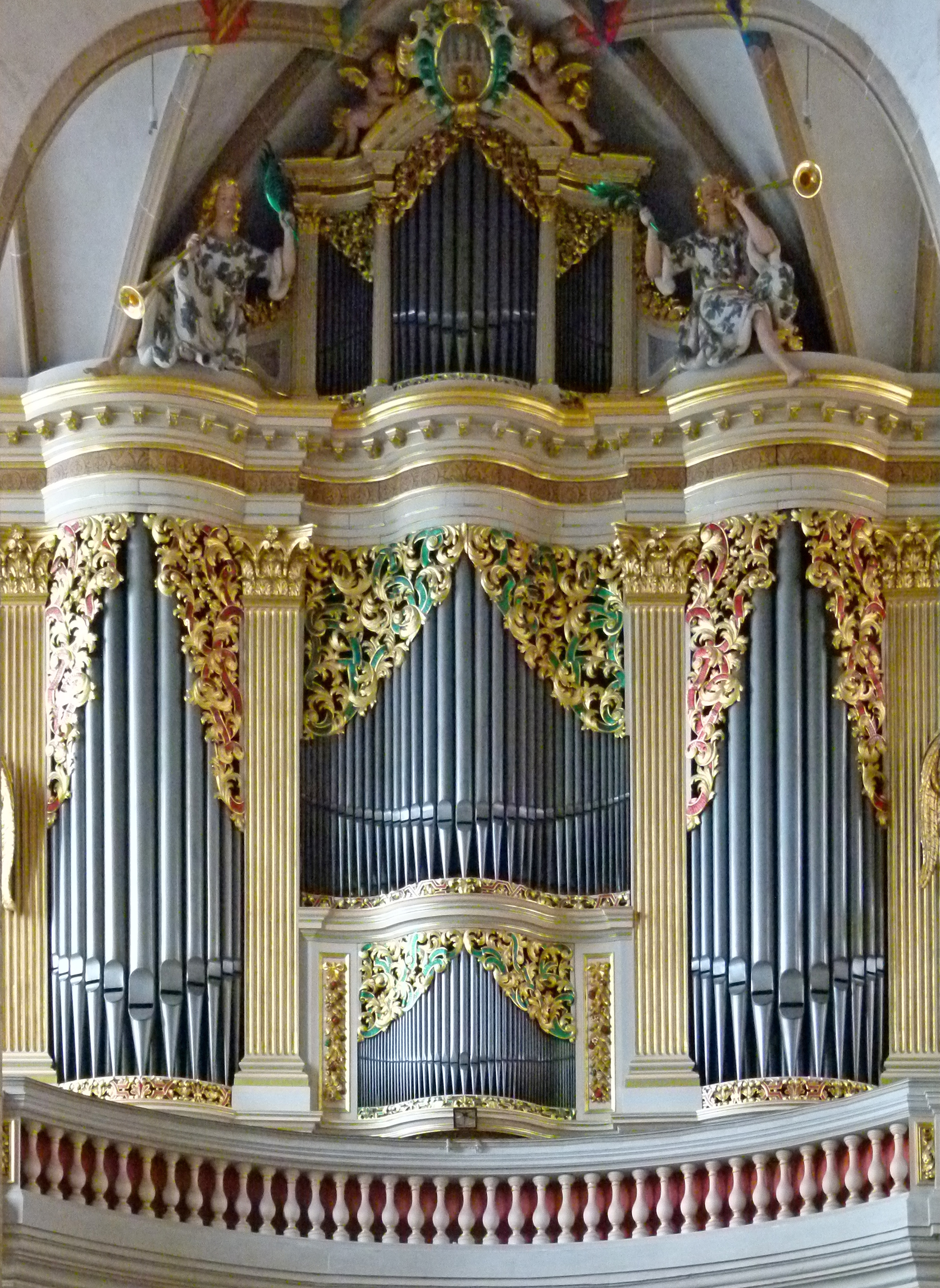
Silbermann organ in Freiberg Cathedral

The organs that Silbermann and his brother Andreas Silbermann built show a clear and distinctive style, both in architecture and in their music qualities. Gottfried Silbermann never deviated from this style. His ability to earn money with organ construction was remarkable, leading him to uncommon wealth, and his economic operation and slow consolidation of his position eventually created a near monopoly. His apprentices had to pledge never to work in Central Germany.

Silbermann's non-negotiable style was not welcome everywhere, an important example of an opponent being Johann Sebastian Bach, who, unlike Silbermann who tuned in meantone temperament, preferred a more flexible tuning.

Silbermann designed and built approximately 50 organs, 35 of which are identified as extant by the Gottfried Silbermann Society, including the organ in the Hofkirche in Dresden. The Hofkirche organ and that of Freiberg Cathedral are considered his greatest works. The organ in Freiberg Cathedral has three manuals, or keyboards, and 41 stops divided between the Oberwerk, Hauptwerk, Brustwerk and Pedal divisions. (A division is a section of pipes in the same place within an organ, played from one manual; there is generally one manual for each division, and the pedal has its own division.) Silbermann's organs are characterised by the use of strong reeds, a broad range of stops, and pipes with a high tin content, which adds a distinctive brightness to the tone.

== Silbermann and the piano ==
Silbermann was also a central figure in the history of the piano. He transmitted to later builders the crucial ideas of Bartolomeo Cristofori (the inventor of the piano), ensuring their survival, and also invented the forerunner of the damper pedal.

Evidence from the Universal-Lexicon of Johann Heinrich Zedler indicates that Silbermann first built a piano in 1732, only a year after Cristofori's death. Silbermann may have found out about Cristofori's invention as follows. In 1709, Scipione Maffei did research on the newly invented piano, including an interview with Cristofori, and published his findings (with a ringing endorsement of the instrument) in a 1711 Italian journal article. In 1725, this article was translated into German by the Dresden court poet Johann Ulrich König, who was almost certainly a personal acquaintance of Silbermann.

In his mature pianos, Silbermann scrupulously copied the complex action found in Cristofori's last instruments, failing only to produce a correct copy of the back check. Silbermann also copied another ingenious Cristofori invention, the inverted wrest plank. In other respects (case construction, choice of wood species, string diameters and spacing, keyboard design), Silbermann relied on his own experience as a harpsichord builder.

During the 1740s, King Frederick the Great of Prussia became acquainted with Silbermann's pianos and bought a number of them (the early-19th-century musicologist Johann Nikolaus Forkel claims this number was 15, though Stewart Pollens (reference below) believes this to be "certainly exaggerated"). Two of Silbermann's pianos are still located in Frederick's palaces in Potsdam today; they stand out for their elegant but plain and sober design amid the elaborate splendor of their surroundings.

There is a Silbermann original in the Germanisches Nationalmuseum. The famous Carl Philipp Emanuel Bach was employed by Frederick the Great in Potsdam and was playing Silbermann fortepianos (also accompanying Frederick on the traverso flute), so in this way Silbermann pianos are connected with the CPE Bach name and his music, which was written for this particular fortepiano model.

Two of Silbermann's pianos are still located in Frederick's palaces in Potsdam today. There is also an original Silbermann piano in the Germanisches Nationalmuseum. Gottfried Silbermann's 1749 instrument has been used as a model for making modern piano copies.

=== The forerunner of the damper pedal ===
Silbermann invented a device by which the player could lift all of the dampers off the strings, permitting them to vibrate freely, either when struck or sympathetically when other notes were played. This is the function in later pianos of the damper pedal. Silbermann's device was different from the modern damper pedal in two respects. First, it was not actually controlled by a pedal, but rather was a hand stop, which required the player to cease playing on the keys for a moment in order to change the damper configuration. Thus, it was a device for imparting an unusual tonal color to whole passages, rather than a means of nuanced expression as the pedal is today. Second, Silbermann's device was bifurcated, permitting the dampers of the treble and bass sections to be lifted separately. This latter feature was reintroduced to the piano in the 20th century, in the form of the fourth and fifth pedals of pianos made by the Borgato firm; see Innovations in the piano.

There are at least two possible reasons for why Silbermann invented his damper-lifting mechanism. First, as an organ builder, he may have favored the idea of providing the player with a variety of tonal colors. The same impulse led German harpsichord builders of the time to occasionally include two-foot (two octaves higher than normal pitch) and sixteen-foot (one octave lower) choirs of strings in their instruments.

In addition, Silbermann had until 1727 built very large hammer dulcimers, called pantaleons, on behalf of Pantaleon Hebenstreit, who achieved a sensational career with virtuosic playing on this demanding instrument. The pantaleon, like any other hammered dulcimer, had no dampers and thus created a wash of sound. Silbermann later had a falling out with Hebenstreit and was blocked by a royal writ from building any further pantaleons. Stewart Pollens conjectures that in adding the damper-raising stop to the piano, Silberman may have been attempting to partially circumvent this restriction.

=== Silbermann and Bach ===
The 18th-century musician Johann Friedrich Agricola tells a story about the relationship of Silbermann, Johann Sebastian Bach, and pianos. After Silbermann had completed two instruments, Agricola says, he showed them to Bach, who replied critically, saying that the tone was weak in the treble and the keys were hard to play even though the tone was pleasant. Silbermann was stung and angered by the criticism, but ultimately took it to heart and was able to improve his pianos (exactly how is not known, but it may have been the result of Silbermann's encountering Cristofori's most mature instruments). The improved Silbermann pianos met with Bach's "complete approval" ("völlige Gutheißung"), and indeed a preserved sales voucher dated May 8, 1749 shows that Bach acted as an intermediary for Silbermann in the sale of one of his pianos. Bach also endorsed Silbermann's organs, as borne out by the fact that he was asked by both the church and Silbermann to give the inaugural concert of his new instrument on 1 December 1736 for the Frauenkirche Dresden.

=== Silbermann's pupils ===
Silbermann's most important contribution to the piano may have been as the teacher of other builders. His nephew and pupil Johann Andreas Silbermann was the teacher of Johann Andreas Stein, who perfected the so-called "Viennese action", found in the pianos used by Haydn, Mozart, and Beethoven. Another group of Silbermann pupils were the so-called "twelve apostles". These builders fled Germany during and after the time of chaos created by the Seven Years' War (1756–1763), migrating to England, where economic prosperity was creating new opportunities for instrument builders. The "twelve apostles" included Johannes Zumpe, whose invention of an affordable small square piano greatly popularized the instrument. They also included Americus Backers, one of the inventors of the "English action", which was a modified version of the Cristofori action.

Silbermann's role was crucial because, unlike other builders of his day, he refused to compromise on the quality of the action. Cristofori's action was complex and hard to build, leading many builders (e.g. Zumpe) to use instead a simplified, but clumsier action. Through Backers and others, the original conception of a complex but effective action survived. The English action was later modified and improved further by Sébastien Érard and Henri Herz to yield the action used in all grand pianos today. With the advent of industrial methods of manufacture, it ultimately became economical to include the complex modern action even in inexpensive pianos, thus vindicating Silbermann's original decision.

Silbermann's fame as a builder and teacher was such that for many decades he was regarded as the inventor of the piano; it was only with nineteenth-century scholarship that this honor was restored to Cristofori.

== See also ==
- List of historical harpsichord makers
