= Johann Andreas Stein =

German maker of keyboard instruments (1728 – 1792)

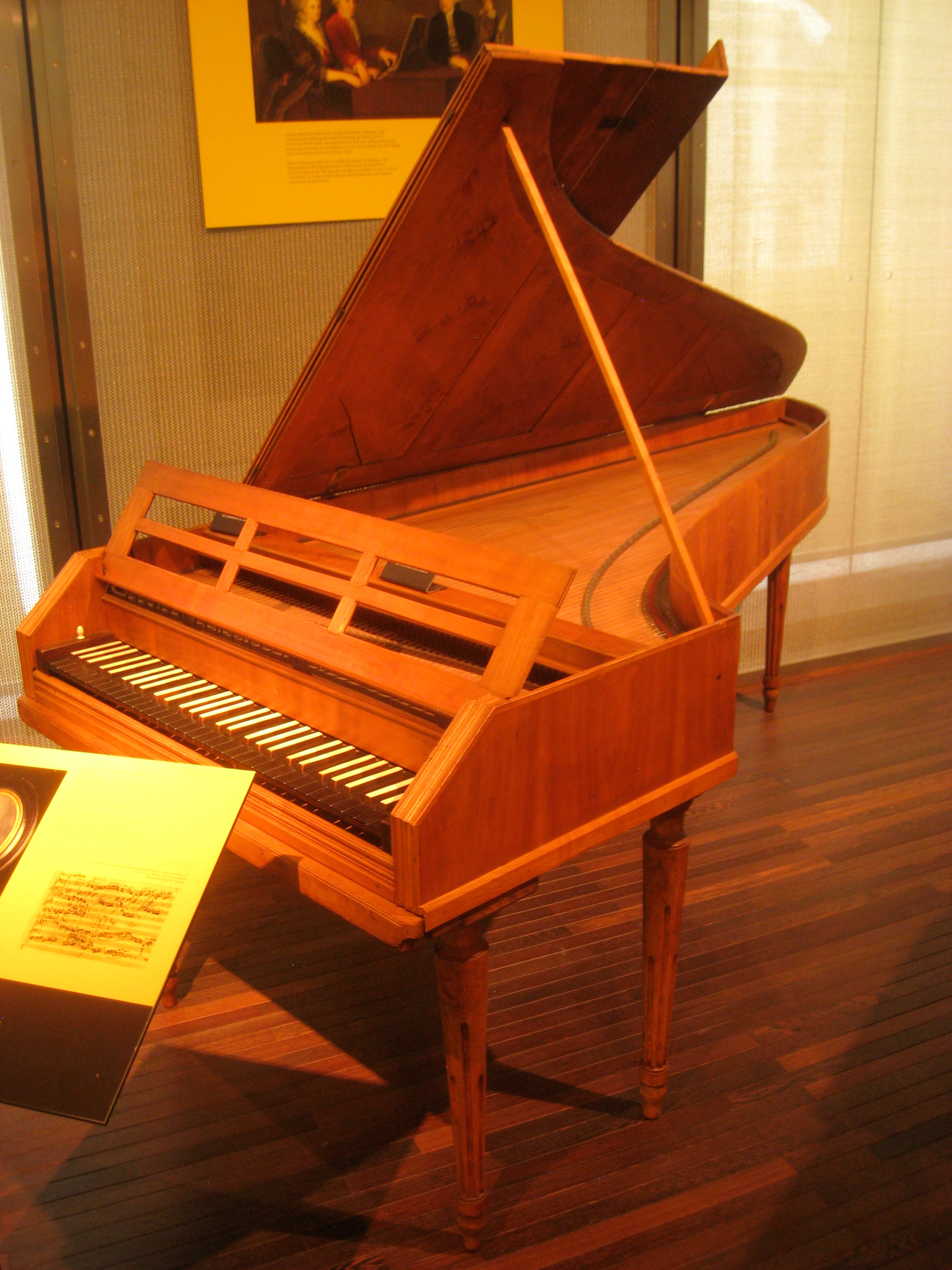
1786 fortepiano by Johann Andreas Stein, now in the Musical Instrument Museum in Brussels

Johann (Georg) Andreas Stein (16 May 1728 – 29 February 1792) was an outstanding German maker of keyboard instruments, a central figure in the history of the piano.

He was primarily responsible for the design of the so-called German hammer action. Pianos with this hammer action, or its more developed form known as the Viennese action, may be said to be appropriate for the performance of the piano music of Haydn, Mozart, and the early works of Beethoven and Schubert.

== Life ==
Stein was born in 1728 in Heidelsheim in the Upper Palatinate. He died in Augsburg in 1792. He learned his trade as an organ builder from his father in Heidelsheim. From August 1748 to January 1749, he worked as a journeyman at two workshops, those of Johann Andreas Silbermann in Strasbourg and of Franz Jakob Späth in Regensburg. Johann Andreas Silbermann was the eldest of the four sons of Andreas Silbermann, the elder brother of Gottfried Silbermann. Stein settled in Augsburg, probably in 1750 and became a citizen in 1756 or 1757, the latter being the year in which he completed his magnificent organ for the so-called Barfüßerkirche in Augsburg. In the same year, he became an organist at the church. According to a letter he wrote, he gave up organ building in the 1760s in order to devote himself to stringed keyboard instruments. His first contact with piano making may have occurred in the Späth workshop, not in the Silbermann workshop.

As a stringed keyboard instrument maker, Stein built clavichords, harpsichords, and pianos. He also built some more extraordinary keyboard instruments, including the "Poli-Toni-Clavichordium" (described in the Augsburg Intelligenzblatt in 1769) that combined a large harpsichord having four choirs of strings (registration 8', 8', 8', 16') with a piano. He also built (1772) the "Melodica," a small organ in which the player's touch could alter volume, which could be used with a harpsichord or a piano or on a separate manual of an organ or simply as a solo instrument. The importance of the Melodica, of which Stein may only have made a few prototypes, lies in Stein's own 1772 description. In that published description, he expressed his dissatisfaction with keyboard instruments in general because they did not allow expressivity in the manner of the human voice, the violin and the trombone.

The 1769 description of the expressive possibilities of the Poli-Tono-Clavichordium nonetheless shows Stein's confidence in stringed keyboard instruments that in the end led him to the invention of his so-called German hammer action shortly before 1780. He also built "vis-à-vis" instruments with a piano and a harpsichord facing one another in a single case. In both the surviving examples (Verona 1777, Naples 1783), the player of the harpsichord (8', 8', 8', 16' in Verona, 8' quill, 8' leather, 4' quill in Naples) can also couple the piano action at the other end on one of the harpsichord keyboards. The Verona instrument has hand stops for engaging and disengaging the stops, in the manner of an organ or a German harpsichord, whereas the Naples instrument has knee levers in the manner of French harpsichords.

Stein travelled twice to Paris and once to Vienna. He also made trips to other cities in Germany and Switzerland to deliver instruments as evidenced in his notebook. The hammer action in the 1777 Vis-à-vis is unique in Stein's oeuvre, that in the 1783 Vis-à-vis is Stein's so-called German action.

Two clavichords by Stein survive, one of them, now in the Budapest National Museum, was bought by Leopold Mozart for practising while travelling. One instrument combining a piano and a single rank of organ pipes survives in Gothenburg’s Historical Museum. About fifteen Hammerflügel (wing-shaped pianos) bearing Stein's label survive, ranging in date from 1780 to 1794 (sic). The making of those after about 1790 would have been supervised by Nannette, Stein's daughter. Of the fifteen, two are privately owned (1782 and 1783).

The instrument shown above is not by Stein but probably by Louis Dulcken. Apart from the music desk, typical of Dulcken's work, the instrument has the appearance of a piano by Stein. Many such instruments built after Stein, some with fake labels, exist.

== His contributions to the piano ==
=== The Prellmechanik action ===
Stein's most important innovation was perfected around 1780, and became known as the Prellzungenmechanik, or German action, and distinguished from previous mechanisms by an escapement mechanism.

In this arrangement, each hammer was mounted on top of the key, with the head on the end closer to the player, a traditional arrangement in German pianos of Stein's day. The hammers were like small, asymmetrical levers, with the hammer head far from the fulcrum, and a small upward-facing hook ("beak") on the other side of the lever, much closer to the fulcrum. When the player depressed the key, the whole hammer assembly would rise. The beak would engage an escapement hopper attached to the keyframe. The escapement hopper pulled down on the beak as it rose, in turn causing the hammer (the other end of the lever) to fly upward and strike the string. The escapement hopper was hinged and sprung; this permitted the beak to push past it as the key sank back to rest position.

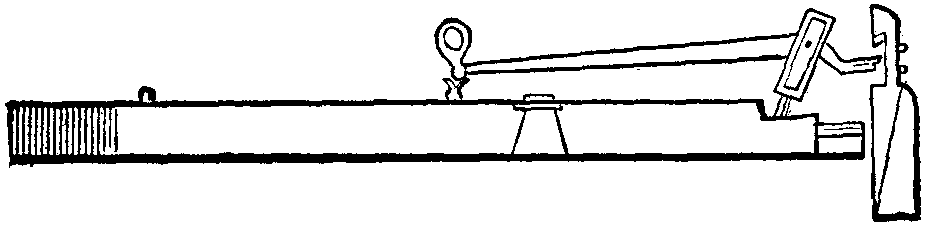
Diagram of the Stein action

Latcham (see Grove reference below) calls this invention "a breakthrough in the piano's history;" it "offer[ed] the player a remarkable control of the hammers, especially when playing softly, and [wa]s astonishingly responsive to the player’s touch."

=== Damper control ===
Stein may have been the first to produce a knee lever for the dampers, the forerunner of the damper pedal using which the player can disengage all the dampers from the strings. Such a device had been devised by Gottfried Silbermann in the 1740s for his wing-shaped pianos but it was operated by two hand levers and required the use of the player's hands to work them, and thus could only be deployed during pauses in the music. Stein's device was controlled by a knee lever.

Stein's device is mentioned in the 1769 description of his Poly-Toni-Clavichordium. It is clear from the description however that Stein's 1769 knee lever, when pressed in, engaged the dampers; it did not disengage them. Playing pianos without the dampers, using a knee lever to engage the dampers when required was not unusual at the time. Stein's later pianos, starting with the one described by Mozart in 1777, had a knee lever for disengaging all the dampers at once, permitting the equivalent of modern piano pedaling

=== Stein's acquaintance with Mozart ===
Mozart visited and befriended Stein in Augsburg in 1777, during the (unsuccessful) job-hunting tour that took him also to Mannheim and Paris. The enthusiastic letter that Mozart wrote to his father Leopold is informative concerning Stein and Mozart's own preferences in pianos. The letter is very widely quoted. The following translation, by Emily Anderson, is taken from Broder 1941:

This time I shall begin at once with Stein's pianofortes. Before I had seen any of his make, Späth's claviers had always been my favourites. But now I much prefer Stein's, for they damp ever so much better than the Regensburg instruments. ... In whatever way I touch the keys, the tone is always even. It never jars, it is never stronger or weaker or entirely absent; in a word, it is always even.

It is true that he does not sell a pianoforte of this kind for less than three hundred gulden, but the trouble and the labour which Stein puts into the making of it cannot be paid for. His instruments have this special advantage over others that they are made with escape action. Only one maker in a hundred bothers about this. But without an escapement it is impossible to avoid jangling and vibration after the note is struck. When you touch the keys, the hammers fall back again the moment after they have struck the strings, whether you hold down the keys or release them ...

He guarantees that the sounding-board will neither break nor split. When he has finished making one for a clavier, he places it in the open air, exposing it to rain, snow, the heat of the sun and all the devils in order that it may crack. Then he inserts wedges and glues them in to make the instrument very strong and firm. He is delighted when it cracks, for he can then be sure that nothing more can happen to it. Indeed he often cuts into it himself and then glues it together again and strengthens it in this way ...

The device too which you work with your knee is better on his than on other instruments. I have only to touch it and it works; and when you shift your knee the slightest bit, you do not hear the least reverberation.'

This letter dates from before the oldest-known piano (1780) by Stein with his German action. The only piano by Stein of before 1780 is the piano in the 1777 Vis-à-vis in Verona. That piano has a different type of hammer action, but also one with an escapement mechanism for the hammers. It may have been this earlier action that impressed Mozart.

During the years following his move to Vienna (1781), Mozart bought a piano, not from Stein, but from Anton Walter, a Viennese builder who followed Stein's design principles but may be said to have improved them. It is not known whether Mozart actually preferred Walter's pianos to Stein's. Mozart probably bought his piano by Walter in 1782. The instrument still exists but with a hammer action that has almost certainly been changed by Walter after Mozart's death, perhaps in about 1805. The type of hammer action the Mozart piano had when Mozart owned it is not known. Walter probably first made his developed form of Stein's hammer action in about 1789.

== Stein piano dynasty ==
Stein was the founder of a distinguished piano-making dynasty. His daughter Nannette (Augsburg, 1769 - Vienna 1833) took on the leadership of her father's firm in about 1790 when her father had become too ill to continue. In 1794, Nannette, together with her husband Andreas Streicher (1761–1833), whom she married in the same year, and her brother Matthäus Stein (1776–1842), moved her family’s piano-making firm from Augsburg, where it was founded by her father, to Vienna, and continued the family business under her husband's name, Streicher.

In the autumn of 1802, the siblings, who inscribed their instruments with the name Frère et Sœur Stein in Wien, separated. Nannette then inscribed her instruments Nannette Streicher née Stein in Wien. Some innovations were made in about 1805 but by 1807 she had developed her father’s small five-octave piano, shaped like a harpsichord, into an impressive grand piano of six-and-a-half octaves. Some more improvements were made by 1811, but after that date her design was maintained largely unchanged until Johann Baptist Streicher (1796–1871), her son, became joint owner of the firm with his mother in 1823.

The firm continued after Nannette’s death under her son and after his death in 1871, under his son Emil. Emil’s son, the composer Theodor Streicher, owned the Hammerflügel of 1808 by Nannette Streicher in the collection of the Germanisches Nationalmuseum (inv. no. MIR 1117). In 1896 the firm ceased production, just over one hundred years after the move to Vienna.

Meanwhile, after the separation of the siblings, Nannette's brother, known as André Stein, also continued to build pianos. In 1796 André married Maria Theresia Dischler (1769–1855), an event marked by a letter from Beethoven including his congratulations. The letter mentions a piano by Nannette Streicher that he had on loan for an Accademie. The letter suggests that the sound of the instrument was too weak for Beethoven's needs. André Stein obtained his citizenship of Vienna and became a master piano maker there in 1803. Despite Andreas Streicher’s adverse comments (mostly of a personal nature to do with André Stein’s reputedly difficult character), André Stein made fine instruments and developed an individual style thought by some to exceed that of his sister Nannette. He flourished in the 1820s.

In 1828 Friedrich Wieck (1785–1873) acquired a Hammerflügel by André Stein for his daughter Clara (1819–1896). She later married Robert Schumann, and her instrument by Stein is preserved today in the Robert Schumann House in Zwickau, and pictured on the German DM 100 banknote issued in 1989.

From Beethoven’s conversation books it is clear that André Stein was well known to Beethoven and helped him not only by tuning and maintaining instruments but also by making a large horn to amplify the sound of the piano. Matthäus Andreas died in May 1842 in the Mondscheinhaus, the building bought by his only son Carl Andreas Stein (1797–1863) from the renowned piano maker Conrad Graf (1782–1851) in 1841.

Carl Andreas continued in his father’s footsteps as a piano maker but also made a name as a composer and as a pianist. Numerous instruments by André Stein survive, including more than twenty Hammerflügel dating from about 1803 to at least 1838, at least 26 square pianos, probably all after 1815, and two upright Hammerflügel. Most of these pianos are in public collections.

Recordings made with replicas of instruments by Stein

- Ronald Brautigam. Ludwig van Beethoven. Complete works for solo piano, Vol.9. Played on a replica of Stein piano made by Paul McNulty. Label: BIS
- Alexei Lubimov and his colleagues. Ludwig van Beethoven. Complete piano sonatas. Played on copies of Stein, Walter, Graf, Buchholtz instruments made by Paul McNulty. Label: Moscow Conservatory Records

== See also ==
- Timeline of harpsichord makers
