= Johannes Zumpe =

German-born English piano-maker

Johannes (Johann Christoph) Zumpe (pronounced zumpy; 14 June 1726 in Fürth, Free Imperial City of Nuremberg, modern Germany – buried 5 December 1790 in London, UK) was a leading maker of early English square pianos, a form of rectangular piano with a compass of about five octaves. The pianos sounded like mellow harpsichords, and had a damper stop in the left cheek of the case. Zumpe is known as the creator of English square pianos.

== Biography ==
Of German/Saxon origin, Johnannes Zumpe was born in June 1726. He trained with the Gottfried Silbermann. He was one of the “twelve Apostles”, German makers of keyboard instruments who fled to London at the time of the Seven Years' War. He worked briefly for Burkat Shudi, before setting up his own shop “at the sign of the Golden Guittar” in Princes Street, Hanover Square, in 1761.

From 1769 until 24 September 1778, Zumpe was in partnership with Gabriel Buntebart. Meincke Meyer joined Zumpe in 1778. The business was taken over in 1783 by Frederick Schoene, who advertised his piano-making firm as "Successors to Johannes Zumpe".

Zumpe married Elizabeth Beeston on 3 December 1760. His will, dated 1784, gives his address as Queen Charlotte Row in the parish of St Mary-le-Bow.

== Pianos ==
The pianos in Zumpe's style were built from about 1760 to 1800. In Zumpe's day they played a role not unlike the upright piano of today: they were more compact and affordable than the full-size wing-shaped instrument. As such, they played an important role in the spread of the piano among musicians, particularly amateurs. By the time the last Zumpe pianos were made, the piano had essentially displaced the harpsichord from its formerly predominant position.

Johann Christian Bach performed on a Zumpe instrument, and possibly acted as a sales agent for Zumpe pianos. Although most famous for his square pianos, other Zumpe instruments survive, including full-sized pianos, harpsichords, an English guitar of 1762, and a mandora of 1764.

== Action ==
The action of these small instruments is known as the "English single" and is unusually simple (for instance, it is far simpler than the original piano action as invented by Bartolomeo Cristofori.) It consists of a small "sticker" simply pushing up on a hammer, while a rod passing through the hitch pin plank lifted up a damper lever hinged from a rail attached to the spine. The action is illustrated below.

Action parts:

1. key; the portion pressed by the player is on the far right
2. jack; a wire with leather stud on top, known by the workmen as the "old man's head"
3. whalebone rear guide, projects from the end of the key, works in a groove to keep the key steady
4. hammer; strikes the string to produce sound
5. whalebone jack, called the mopstick
6. damper; when in lowered position stops the sound of the string
7. whalebone damper spring
