= Fantasy in C minor =

Fantasy in C minor may refer to:

- Choral Fantasy (Beethoven)
- Fantasia No. 2 (Mozart)
- Fantasia in C minor, K. 475, by Wolfgang Amadeus Mozart
- Fantasy in C minor, D 2E (Schubert)
