= Philip Belt =

Philip Ralph Belt (2 January 1927 - 11 May 2015) was a pioneering builder of pianos in historical style, in particular the 18th century instruments commonly called fortepianos. His pianos were modeled on instruments made by historical builders, particularly Johann Andreas Stein and Anton Walter. Belt's pianos played a role in the revival of performance on historical instruments that was an important trend in classical music in the second half of the 20th century and continues to this day.

== Life ==
Sources for Belt's life and work include a brief web-posted autobiography from 1996, as well as biographical articles prepared by Luis Sanchez (a fortepianist and academic), Peter O'Donnell (a fellow instrument builder), and journalists Thomas Kunkel and Rachel Sheeley. A brief article about Belt by Sanchez appears in the New Grove Dictionary of Music and Musicians.

=== Early life ===
Belt grew up on a farm on the outskirts of Hagerstown, Indiana, a town of about 2,000 people. In his family there were two younger sisters and an older brother, who was killed in the Second World War. While young Belt showed a mechanical bent; starting at age 11 he built hundreds of model airplanes; eventually not from kits, but from scratch. According to O'Donnell, "In high school he took four years of metal shop, and even made a working one-cylinder engine." Sheeley continues, "His first job after graduating from Hagerstown High School in 1945 was to deliver cattle and horses to war-torn Poland. Back home, he began working in a New Castle music store." He first repaired band instruments, then learned the craft of piano tuning from a local tuner, then moved into maintenance and repair of pianos. His curiosity then led him to experiment with pianos, trying "with various kinds of wire and soundboard modifications to learn what he could about things that might affect a piano's sound" (O'Donnell).

=== Finding his métier ===
His career as builder was launched by accident (Sheeley): "It was during Belt’s tenure with the ... music store that he was assigned to tune a piano in the [nearby] Cambridge City home of a childhood sweetheart. On that day in 1959, his former sweetheart showed him a family treasure, an antique German square piano brought to America by the family in the 1700s". The piano had been made by the German builder Christian Ernst Frederici in 1758. O'Donnell writes: "He made drawings, learned what he could about its origin, and decided to build a piano using it as the model: 'Something just clicked in my mind -- that's what I'd like to do.'"

Belt in the meantime left his home town and changed jobs, working in Oak Ridge, Tennessee in a wood shop making fine cabinetry. It was in Oak Ridge in the early 1960s that he succeeded in making a copy of the Frederici instrument. The Frederici copy led to the next step in Belt's career: in 1965 he was invited by Scott Odell, a curator of musical instruments at the Smithsonian Institution, to disassemble, measure, and make drawings of a fortepiano there, the work of Johann Lodewijk Dulcken. When Belt later took up production of replica instruments, the Dulcken provided the detailed measurements that he needed to serve as his first model.

Later in 1965, Belt moved with his family to Waltham, Massachusetts, where he served apprenticeships with two pioneers of historical harpsichord construction, first briefly with William Dowd, then for two years with Frank Hubbard. Belt built a number of harpsichords under Hubbard's direction, but he also "moonlighted", setting up a workshop in his basement to work on fortepianos.

At the end of the apprenticeship (1967) he relocated his family to Center Conway, New Hampshire, where using the proceeds of his first fortepiano sale (see below) he bought "a 3 acre property with a ten room house and a huge barn attached." The barn became his workshop, where he produced several fortepianos, all based on the Smithsonian Dulcken. His daughter Elizabeth Ross Belt, aged about 7 at the time, later reminisced:

My sister and I spent many happy hours in my father’s workshop, ‘helping’ him in his work. He always seemed to find something that we could do. People of all walks of life, curious about his work, would visit us at our rambling old ten room house, where my father set up shop in an attached barn. We entertained many types, from those in suits to the hippies of the day. Of all of them, I preferred the hippies, because they were the most fun.

O'Donnell continues: "Knowledge of Philip's expertise was growing and he was asked to restore the authentic 1784 Stein piano in the Toledo (Ohio) Museum of Art." The process of restoration provided an intimate look at a historical instrument from a leading maker and the foundation for an accurate replica.

=== Belt's pianos achieve success ===
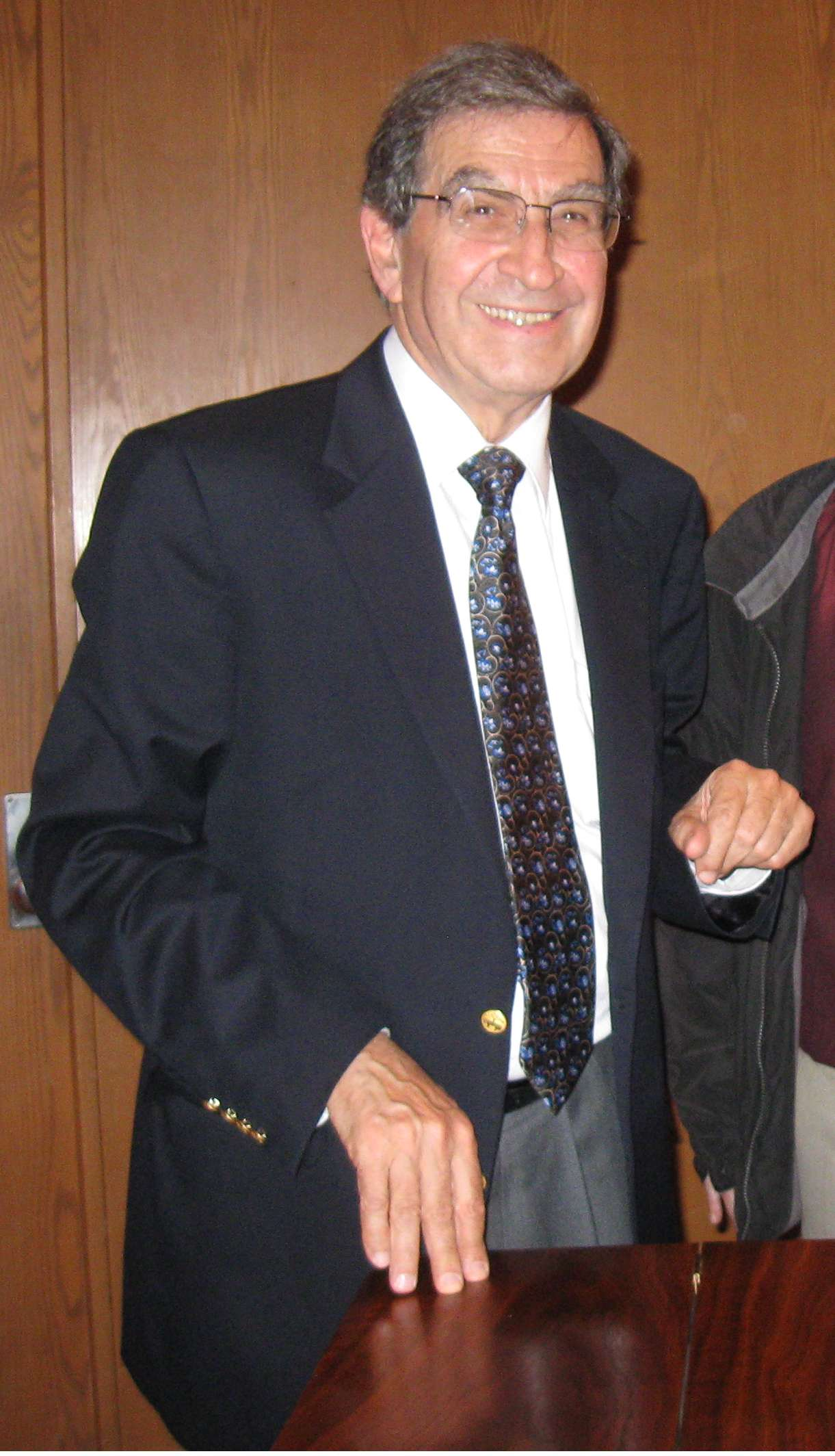
Malcolm Bilson in a masterclass at the University of Michigan, Ann Arbor, in 2009.

Soon, Belt's instruments were being purchased by prominent scholars and performers. Of his first sale, Sanchez writes in the New Grove:

Harvard University professor Luise Vosgerchian purchased Belt’s first fortepiano in 1967 and used it in a concert with violinist Robert Koff, including works by C. P. E. Bach, Wolfgang Amadeus Mozart, and Ludwig van Beethoven. This performance on a replica was unprecedented in the United States; Belt had broken ground in what would become a new era in historical keyboard performance.

In 1968 Belt loaded his second Dulcken copy into his hearse (Belt's vehicle of choice for transport) and showed it, receiving expert approval, at universities in the Midwest. The following year, he loaned the Dulcken copy to Malcolm Bilson, then an assistant professor at Cornell University, who spent a week in intensive practice preparing for a concert, altering his technique and interpretive approach to match the new instrument. (Fortepianos pose challenges to performers trained on modern instruments: the touch is extremely light and very sensitive, the decay time of notes is far shorter, and the key spacing is usually narrower.) Bilson clearly found his encounter with the fortepiano to be gripping; that same year he bought his own Dulcken replica from Belt and launched a new career focusing on the fortepiano. Bilson's (quite successful) career raised the prominence of the fortepiano in the musical world, as well as the reputation of Belt's instruments. Bilson later said of Belt:

There were several builders both here and in Europe engaged in trying to build these instruments, but Philip Belt stands out as the only one at that time to build a totally convincing, well-balanced instrument. It was in no case a curiosity, but a piano as perfect in its own way as any modern piano.

Bilson also became an articulate advocate of the fortepiano in his writings and demonstration videos, arguing that historical pianos are often better suited to the performance of the music of their own time (for Belt's instruments this would include the works of Haydn, Mozart, and Beethoven), and permit a more complete fulfillment of the music's potential.

Another fortepianist influenced by Belt was Steven Lubin, who in the 1960s visited Belt's Center Conway workshop to learn about the fortepiano. Lubin eventually built his own fortepiano replica (with the help of a piano technician friend, Lee Morton, who had served as Belt's apprentice), and pursued a successful solo career with it.

Thomas Kunkel, writing a brief biography of Belt, also provided an intuitive assessment of the aesthetic contributions of the revival fortepiano:

Not long after I first met Philip Belt, I fished out a tape he had given me and popped it into my dashboard cassette player. It was a recording of acclaimed pianist Malcolm Bilson performing the majestic Mozart piano concerto No. 13 in C Major (K. 415) on one of Belt's fortepianos. The sound seemed extraordinarily bright. Toward the end of the opening allegro, for instance, the notes in the cadenza come in dazzling torrents. Yet, despite the speed with which Bilson played, every note was clear and distinct. To feel the difference, I dusted off an old LP of the same piece, record by another world-famous performer on a modern concert grand. The playing was beautiful but, compared to the fortepiano, the sound seems almost muted, the rapid passages of the allegro slurred. It was like listening to Bilson's version with earmuffs on.

==== Replicas vs. historical instruments ====
Belt's replicas were not the first historically styled pianos used in 20th-century performance of earlier music; earlier efforts had employed actual historical instruments, restored by technicians to playing condition. This approach proved problematic, as harpsichord builder Carey Beebe has explained:

"Modern interest was aroused in the possibilities of the early piano by European pioneers like Paul Badura-Skoda and Jörg Demus. The recordings of these players were initially confined to too-often tinny and out of tune original instruments, far past their prime or poorly ‘restored’ or prepared: This was sadly characteristic of the 60s and 70s, and despite the impeccable intentions of the musicians concerned, probably spoilt the concept for many otherwise open-minded listeners."

Beebe goes on to say that it was the introduction of pristine-condition replica instruments, as made by Belt and others, that enabled a far more successful revival of historical practice. Similar remarks were made earlier by the musicologist Robert Winter, who like Carey criticizes Badura-Skoda and Demus's use of dilapidated old instruments. Winter also lavished praise on an early recording of Mozart's music (Golden Crest CRS 4097) that Bilson made with the Dulcken replica he purchased from Belt:

The sound [of the Belt Dulcken replica] is ravishing in its clarity and expressive powers. Much of this has to do with an apparent handicap under which American collectors suffer, which has been transformed into an enormous asset by Philip Belt. ... For Europeans it is a great deal easier to locate, purchase, and restore old instruments. These items are scarce in this country, and often the only alternative is to build a copy. If the builder is a master craftsman, the result is a new creation which retains all the virtues of the old. On the Dulcken reproduction one hears nothing of clattering actions or the death-rattles of sainted strings.

For further information on historical piano replicas and their role in contemporary performance see Historically informed performance and Piano history and musical performance.

==== Recordings ====
Further recordings on Belt instruments followed the one praised by Winter. Perhaps the most notable were the set of all of Mozart's piano concertos with Bilson and the English Baroque Soloists conducted by John Eliot Gardiner. The noted critic Joseph Kerman praised the recordings and described as "beautiful" the 1977 Walter replica by Belt that Bilson owned and used in the recordings.

A Belt discography appears at the end of this article.

=== Scholarship ===
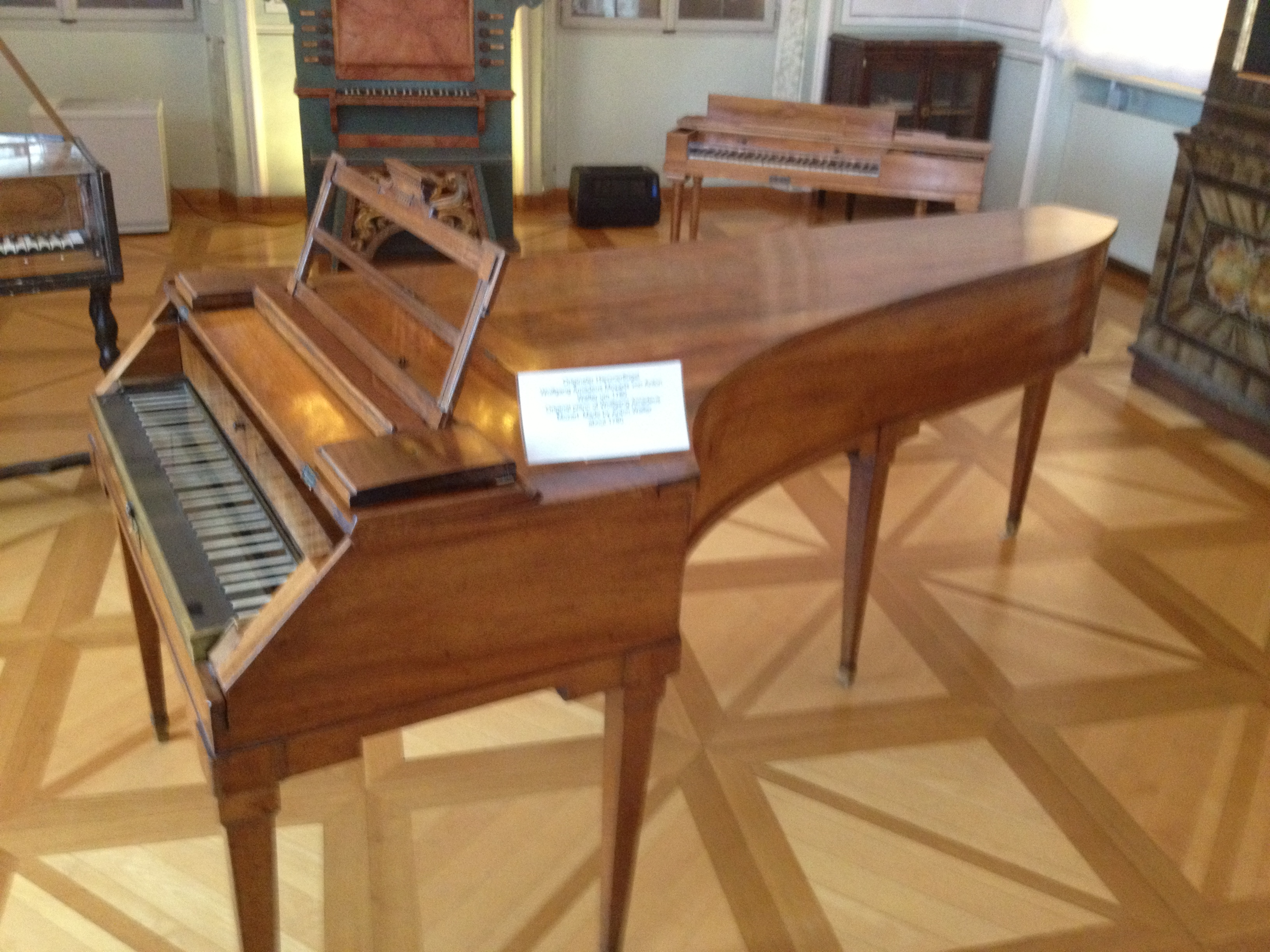
The Mozart Walter in Salzburg

Philip Belt was a scholar as well as a builder; his research included extensive study and measurement of historical instruments, both in the Smithsonian Institution (see above) and in the historical musical instrument collections of Europe. Much of this scholarly work was done in collaboration with Maribel Meisel, a trained musicologist who became Belt's fifth wife in 1973. The newlyweds took their honeymoon in Europe, visiting instrument museums, and the work paid off with measurements of a 1781 Stein in Gothenburg, Sweden, as well as a far more famous instrument, the early 1780s Walter instrument owned by Wolfgang Amadeus Mozart and kept in Mozart's birth home in Salzburg. A stroke of luck paid off for them, as O'Donnell narrates:

In the late sixties he had written to the Mozart Museum in Salzburg in hope of gaining access to the instrument. The reply was curt -- only "scientists and specialists" were permitted a close viewing and no measurements were permitted. He sent a second letter and included photos of some of his work. The reply suggested he could examine the Walter but there would be no measuring, and building a replica was absolutely out of the question. So it was that Philip and ... Maribel Meisel arranged to see the piano one morning before the museum was open to the public. A curator took them to the piano and, during their conversation, it developed that Maribel had something in common with him. Her brother had worked with Wernher von Braun (noted German and later American rocket scientist) years before and so had the museum official. 'Boy, he was just elated to find someone who was associated with Dr. von Braun,' Philip says. 'He looked around and said, "I think it would be all right if you want to take a few measurements of the instrument.'"

The measurements served as the initial basis for Belt's Walter replica, which became his most popular instrument.

Belt and Meisel prepared coauthored scholarly writings on the historical piano, which appeared as chapters in the extensive "Pianoforte" article in the New Grove Dictionary of Music and Musicians; the full article was later published as an independent book with Belt as first author.

Historical scholarship played a role in Belt's professional relationship with Malcolm Bilson. The replica of the Mozart Walter that Belt built for Bilson was based, necessarily, on incomplete information. As further research (by others) on this instrument brought more information into public view, Belt continually altered Bilson's piano to reflect this research. Bilson writes:

No one would claim—least of all Belt himself—that [the Mozart Walter copy he first built] was 'an exact copy of Mozart's piano'. Important to the story, however, is the fact that each time information on the Mozart Walter became available, Belt would take my piano into his shop and rework it. ... He completely reworked the action with new parts, new balance points, etc. The bridge was changed, and not only was the instrument releathered but a new type of leather buildup was installed, etc. Yet the soul (if I may use the word) of the instrument never changed—that had been built into the box at the beginning.

=== Kits ===
Belt also ventured into the area of user-built kit instruments, following the lead of Wolfgang Zuckermann, who had introduced a hugely successful harpsichord kit, and Frank Hubbard, who had created a more demanding but more historically authentic harpsichord kit. Belt sold his first pianoforte kit to Hubbard in 1972. Later on (1975–1979), Belt went to work for Zuckermann Harpsichords, by then under the leadership of David Jacques Way, where he collaborated with Way on a kit based on the Mozart Walter replica. The kit was only modestly successful: it went into production in 1979 with a run of about 200 copies, which eventually were sold over a period of ten years.

During this time Belt was living in two locations: Battle Ground, Indiana (1971–1975), to which he moved to escape the cold winters of New Hampshire, then Pawcatuck, Connecticut, a small town not far from Way's headquarters in nearby Stonington.

=== Later life ===
Belt eventually had a falling out with the Zuckermann firm, departing in 1979. He had some difficulty finding employment at the time, and in 1982 was divorced from Meisel. The same year he traveled to the Philippines to meet his pen pal, Merlinda Dador, and the two were married there. In fall 1982, they were living in Pawcatuck, and Belt found stable employment as a piano tuner and technician in New Haven, 60 miles away. He also set up his own workshop in New Haven on the premises of the old New Haven Clock Company, and a few new commissions came his way. The arrangement persisted until the music store at which Belt worked went bankrupt.

Belt spent the years 1986 to 1993 with Merlinda in the Philippines. Again he set up a workshop, this time following local custom by consulting a witch doctor, who obtained the approval of the "unseen people" and offered advice on location and size. The period was not very productive, in part due to inaccessibility of proper woods for building, though Belt did succeed in making a Dulcken-model instrument from locally available Narra wood, later acquired by Case Western Reserve University. He also began building an instrument with a soundboard made of mahogany, another tropical wood (historical and replica instruments typically employ spruce or cypress for their soundboards). This unfinished instrument was later purchased by instrument builder Peter O'Donnell of Iowa City, Iowa, who completed its construction. Belt's eventual return to the United States was motivated in part by the wood issue.

On his return Belt settled briefly in rural Oregon near Eugene then with Merlinda and their three children in his old home town of Hagerstown. He reestablished his workshop in the farrowing pen of a hog barn on the farm of his sister Lucille, and continued to build instruments for a number of years. Near the end of his life, a stroke forced him to retire.

In general terms, it seems that with the passage of time Belt was unable to sustain his initial success at the same level. The peak of his worldly success may have been in 1974, when he had a list of five orders to fill; but when a severe recession hit, three of the orders were cancelled and he was soon without business and forced to work for others. Later on, competing builders entered the field, often sophisticated and with strong scholarly credentials. Over the years, there were again periods without orders. In the end, Belt's lifetime output amounted to fewer than 50 instruments, little more than one per year.

Near the end of Belt's life, Bilson offered a defense of his work in light of later developments:

“The early work of Philip Belt can hardly be overestimated in helping the entire musical endeavor move forward. There are now many fine builders, producing copies of virtually all the greatest masters of the past, makers whose pianos were praised and treasured by Beethoven, Schumann, Chopin and Liszt. One of those fine builders was in my house recently, and I played him a recording I had made in 1972 on my first Belt piano. His mouth fell open, and he said, ‘My whole idea of this movement has changed. I thought that no one could make such a good piano before the mid-1980s!’”

Belt was honored in his old age (2007) when the Midwestern Historical Keyboard Society invited him to their conclave in St. Paul and (as reported by Gregory Crowell) "made a special presentation to him in recognition of his pioneering work on the revival of the fortepiano ... The presence and participation of Belt at the meeting was especially heart warming for all present."

He died in Hagerstown at age 88 on 11 May 2015. His survivors included "his wife of 33 years, Merlinda Belt; eight children, ... and numerous grandchildren and great-grandchildren."

== Personal traits ==
Here are impressions of Belt from people who knew him. Peter O'Donnell, who first met Belt at a scholarly meeting in 1996, called him "outspoken, ... single-minded, self-effacing, eccentric and feisty." An apprentice from the early 1970s called him "kind, intelligent, funny and gifted," and noted that he shared his knowledge with his apprentices freely, ignoring the possibility of future competition. Wolfgang Zuckermann met Belt on a visit to his workshop in Center Conway, part of the research for his book The Modern Harpsichord (1969). Along with a positive review of Belt's professional work, Zuckermann (a steadfast New Yorker) remarked that Belt "had the air of a farmer about him". Given where Belt chose to live, it seems indeed likely that he preferred rural locales.

Belt loved his instruments and found it difficult to relinquish them to their new owners.

He could not read music, nor was he able to play his instruments other than (in Kunkel's words) to "strike a few pleasant chords". He also had perfect pitch, and could tune an instrument by ear alone, although sometimes he would use a middle "C" tuning fork to get his bearings.

His biographers (Sanchez, Sheeley, O'Donnell, Kunkel) mention an interest in "spiritual" matters. Sanchez observed that at the time of his interview with Belt the builder had been reading a book by the medium Elwood Babbitt. Kunkel notes that Belt's upbringing had been in fundamentalist Protestantism, and he struggled for some time before arriving at convictions that suited him more closely.

According to Kunkel and Sheeley, Belt believed in reincarnation. Sheeley wrote, "His relationship with music and musical instruments is spiritual for him and he believes his past lives helped shape his work. He said that as a boy in a past life, he worked in a piano-maker’s shop carving tiny and delicate pieces." Belt suggested to Kunkel that he had lived a previous life as Nannette Streicher (the daughter of Stein and herself a distinguished builder) and told another witness that he had lived as Bartolomeo Cristofori, the inventor of the piano.

Often overlooked was his interest in woodworking. Many beautiful cabinets, shelves, and dressers were built during his lifetime, and are still in use.

== Discography ==
- (1973) Malcolm Bilson, solo; Stein replica. Mozart: Sonatas in B♭ major, K. 281; C Major, K. 330; A Major, K. 331; B♭ Major, K. 570; Adagio in b minor, K. 540 and Eine Kleine Gigue, K. 574. Golden Crest Records.
- (1978–1980) Haydn piano sonatas, played by Malcolm Bilson on a Mozart-Walter replica. Sonata in F major, Hob. XVI: 23. Sonata in C minor, Hob. XVI: 20. Sonata in A♭ major, Hob. XVI: 43. Sonata in B minor, Hob. XVI: 32.--Vol. 2. Sonata in A major, Hob. XVI: 26. Sonata in E minor, Hob. XVI: 34. Sonata in A♭ major, Hob. XVI: 46. Titanic Records.
- (1982) Mozart sonatas and rondos, performed by Mary Sadovnikoff on the 1969 Belt Dulcken replica. Titanic Records.
- (1982) works of Haydn, Mozart, and C. P. E. Bach, performed by Malcolm Bilson on his 1977 Belt Walter replica. Nonesuch.
- (1982) Carl Philipp Emanuel Bach: The complete keyboard fantasias, recorded by Evelyn Garvey using a Philip Belt copy of Mozart's Walter fortepiano, Vienna, 1786. Spectrum SR-146. Source: .
- (1983) Haydn, piano sonatas in E flat H.49 and 52. Malcolm Bilson plays the former on a Stein copy built 1972 by Thomas McCobb "after drawings by Philip Belt" and the latter on his 1977 Walter copy by Belt. Nonesuch 9 78018–4.
- (1984) Mozart piano concertos 9 and 11, with Malcolm Bilson playing a Mozart-Walter replica and John Eliot Gardiner directing the English Baroque Soloists. Archiv.
- (1988) Mozart piano concertos 22 and 23, with Malcolm Bilson playing a Mozart-Walter replica and John Eliot Gardiner directing the English Baroque Soloists. Archiv.
- (1989–1991) Bilson, 1977 Walter replica. Piano sonatas by Mozart: D major, K 311 (= 284c); G major, K 283 (= 189h); B♭ major, K 281; A major, K 331; F major, K 280 (= 189e); C major, K 330 (= 300h). Hungaroton.
- (1994) Quentin & Mary Murrell Faulkner playing various composers including Mozart on a harpsichord and an unidentified Belt replica. Pro Organo.
- (2009) John Khouri performing works of Anton Eberl. Pedal piano by James Kandik and Philip Belt. .
