= Stanley Ritchie =

Australian musician (1935–2026)

- Born: 21 April 1935; Yenda, New South Wales, Australia
- Died: 23 August 2026 (aged 91)
- Education: D.S.C.M., Sydney Conservatorium of Music, 1956
- Occupations: Emeritus Professor of Music (Violin, Historical Performance)

Stanley John Ritchie (21 April 1935 – 23 August 2026) was an Australian violinist and academic who was a distinguished professor emeritus of violin at Jacobs School of Music, Indiana University. A noted specialist in historical performance, Ritchie was author of three relevant books, Before the Chinrest—A Violinist’s Guide to the Mysteries of Pre-Chinrest Technique and Style (2012), The Accompaniment in "Unaccompanied" Bach—Interpreting the Sonatas and Partitas for Solo Violin (2016), and Speaking Bach: Understanding the Language of the Sonatas and Partitas for Solo Violin (2026), all published by Indiana University Press.

== Biography ==
Ritchie's interest in historical performance dated from 1960 while taking a course in performance practice at Yale University, and in baroque violin from 1970 when he and harpsichordist Albert Fuller began performing together in New York. In 1974 he joined harpsichordist Elisabeth Wright in forming Duo Geminiani, giving concerts in North and South America, Europe and Australia, occasionally joined by cellist Anner Bylsma. They were subsequently appointed in 1982 to the faculty of the newly inaugurated Early Music Institute of the Indiana University Jacobs School of Music. .

Graduating from the New South Wales State Conservatorium of Music in 1956, having played in the Sydney Symphony Orchestra from 1954, he was appointed concertmaster of the first Australian Youth Orchestra in 1957, the year in which he also won the Australian Broadcasting Commission's Concerto Competition. In 1958 he was recipient of a French government scholarship, enabling him to study in Paris with Jean Fournier. In the following year he received a scholarship to Yale School of Music, where he was a pupil of Joseph Fuchs. His professional career in the United States began in 1962, when he moved to New York, where he remained until 1973, playing as concertmaster of the New York City Opera Orchestra, associate concertmaster of the Metropolitan Opera Orchestra, and concertmaster of the Musica Aeterna Orchestra. In 1975 he was appointed first violinist of the Philadelphia String Quartet, artists-in-residence at the University of Washington in Seattle.

As a baroque and classical violinist, Ritchie performed many times as concertmaster or soloist with Christopher Hogwood. He played classical violin for twenty years as a member of the Mozartean Players with fortepianist Steven Lubin and baroque cellist Myron Lutzke, as well as performing with fortepianist Malcolm Bilson and cellist Anner Bylsma. He appeared as soloist or conductor with a number of major Early Music orchestras, among them the Academy of Ancient Music, Tafelmusik, Philharmonia Baroque Orchestra, and the Handel and Haydn Society Orchestra.

Ritchie served on the jury of the Leipzig International Bach Competition, and has given masterclasses in Germany, Italy, New Zealand and Australia. He served for ten years as artistic director of the Bloomington Early Music Festival. His ex-students are prominent members of the Early Music profession, some of them occupying important teaching positions in the United States. In June 2009 he received Early Music America's highest award, the Howard Mayer Brown Award for Lifetime Achievement in Early Music, and in 2016 was promoted to Distinguished Professor at Indiana University.

His recordings include Vivaldi's Op.11 Violin Concertos with Hogwood and the Academy of Ancient Music (Oiseau Lyre), the Mozart piano quartets and the complete piano trios of Mozart and Schubert as a member of The Mozartean Players, and a CD of 17th Century music for three violins and continuo entitled 'Three Parts upon a Ground', with John Holloway, Andrew Manze, Nigel North and John Toll, all for Harmonia Mundi USA; selected Concerti and Serenate of Francesco Antonio Bonporti, with Bloomington Baroque (Dorian Discovery); and the Bach Sonatas for violin and obbligato harpsichord with Elisabeth Wright (Focus Records). As a member of Joshua Rifkin's Bach Ensemble, he recorded Violin Concertos at the Court of Weimar. His recording of Bach's Solo Sonatas and Partitas (Musica Omnia) was released in January 2014.

Ritchie died on 23 August 2026, at the age of 91.
