= Ira F. Brilliant Center for Beethoven Studies =

Museum and research institute in California

Coordinates: 37°20′07″N 121°53′06″W

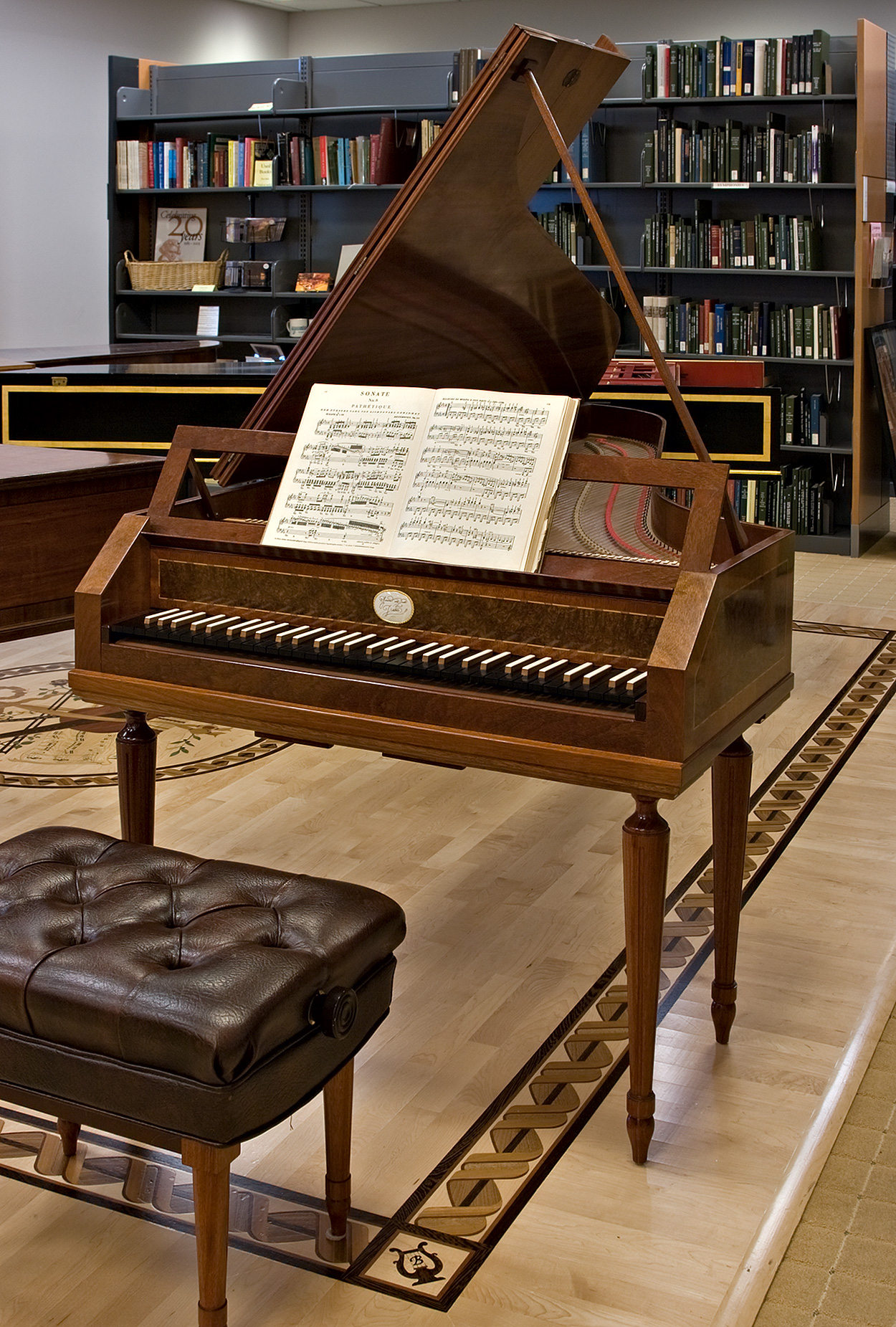
- Visitors can play the reproduction of a 1795 Dulcken fortepiano.
- Formation: 1983, 43 years ago
- Founder: Ira F. Brilliant
- Owner: San Jose State University
- Website: sjsu.edu/beethoven

The Ira F. Brilliant Center for Beethoven Studies serves as a museum, research center, and host of lectures and performances devoted solely to the life and works of Ludwig van Beethoven. It is the only institution of its kind in North America and holds the largest collection of Beethoven works and memorabilia outside Europe. The center is operated by San Jose State University and the American Beethoven Society. It is located on the fifth floor of the Dr. Martin Luther King Jr. Library, which is located on the San Jose State campus in downtown San Jose, California.

== History ==
The center was established in 1983 when Ira F. Brilliant, an Arizona real estate developer, donated his collection of Beethoven memorabilia to San Jose State University with the understanding that the material would be used to start a center devoted to Beethoven's life and works. Including 75 first editions, Brilliant's was considered the finest private collection of Beethoven memorabilia in the United States. The center opened to the public in 1985.

== Operation ==
San Jose State University and the American Beethoven Society share the duties of running the center. San Jose State runs the center as a special collection of its library, providing space and staff. The American Beethoven Society funds many of the center's activities, such as the publication of the semiannual Beethoven Journal and the acquisition of new materials.

== Collection ==
The center has expanded its holdings over the years through donations and acquisitions, notably the 1987 purchase of the collection of Beethoven scholar William S. Newman, musicologist and emeritus professor at the University of North Carolina at Chapel Hill.

=== Reference materials ===
The center holds over 4,000 books and publications about Beethoven - including a rare 1783 issue of Cramer's Magazin der Musik, the first mention of Beethoven in print - and photocopies of over 8,000 articles concerning him. There is also a large microfiche collection, including microfiche of all Beethoven manuscripts held by the Berlin State Library.

=== Works and memorabilia ===
The center's collection of Beethoven first editions has grown to 300, the largest collection in North America. This includes first editions of all of the string quartets and most of the piano sonatas. There are also over 2,200 "early editions", published during Beethoven's lifetime or in the 19th century. There is also a listening/viewing area to sample the center's library of audio recordings and performance videos. The center also holds various items in his handwriting, and a copy of his death mask.

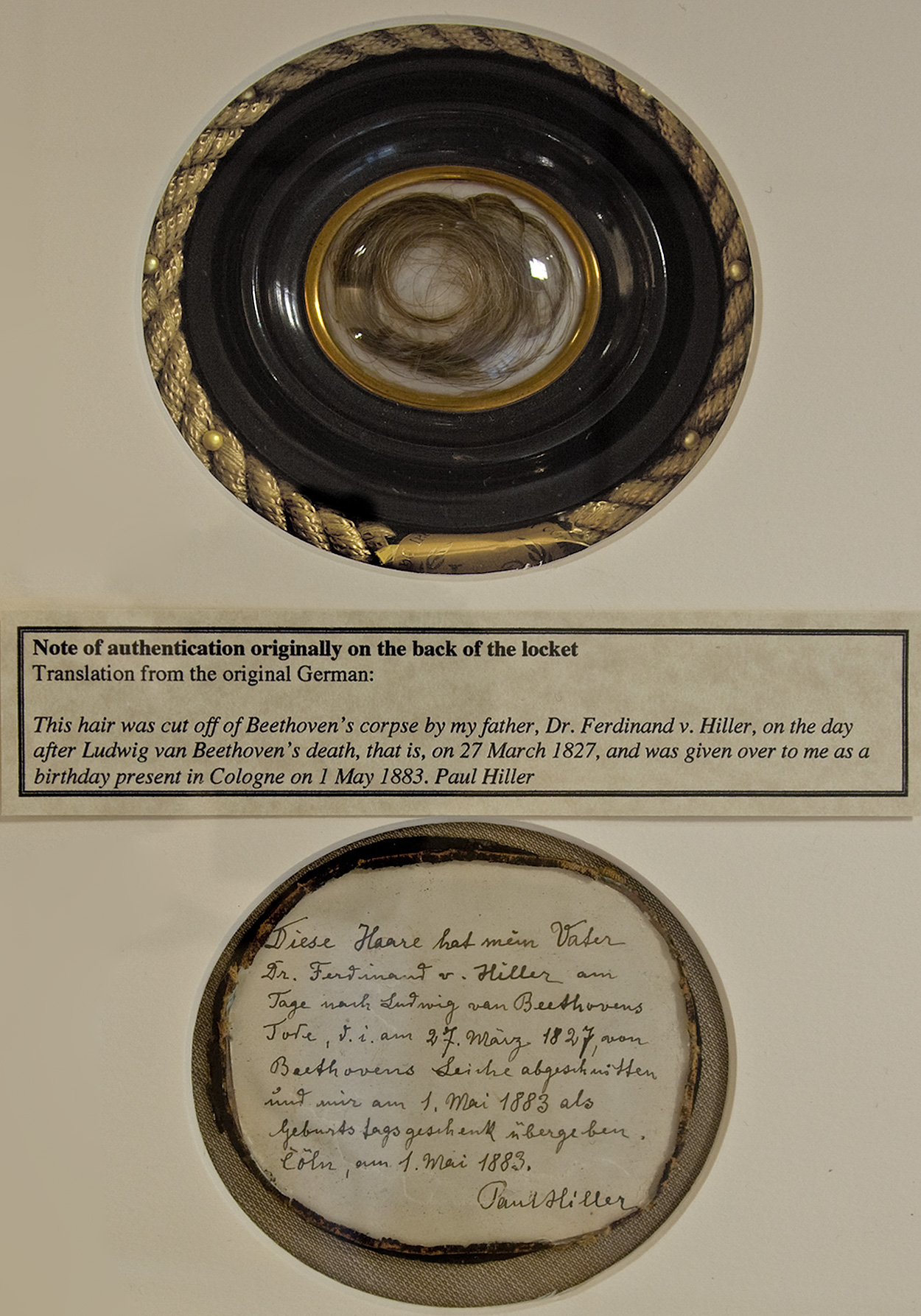
The Guevara Lock and Paul Hiller's inscription from the locket

=== The Guevara Lock ===
Of the holdings of the center, the most well-known is probably a lock of Beethoven's hair known as the Guevara Lock. The lock was cut on March 27, 1827, one day after Beethoven's death, by Ferdinand Hiller, a German composer and conductor who had traveled to Vienna to spend time with Beethoven before he died. Hiller later made the lock a gift to his son Paul, who explained its history on the back of a locket containing the hair. After that, the ownership of the lock is uncertain, until it resurfaced in 1943 as payment to a Danish doctor named Kay Alexander Fremming for medical treatment given to Jews escaping Nazism.

In 1994, the Fremming estate auctioned the lock at Sotheby's in London for £3,600 ($7,300 including commission) to four members of the American Beethoven Society: Dr. Alfredo Guevara, Ira Brilliant, Dr. Thomas Wendel, and Caroline Crummey. The lock was named in honor of Dr. Guevara, the principal investor, who kept a small portion of the hair and donated the rest to the Center for Beethoven Studies. The remaining investors donated their entire portions to the center. The original lock consisted of 582 brown, white and grey hairs, from three to six inches in length. The Center for Beethoven Studies has 422 of those hairs, along with the original locket used by Hiller.

In 1996, Brilliant and Guevara contacted the Health Research Institute – Pfeiffer Treatment Center in Naperville, Illinois, to perform tests on some of the hairs from Dr. Guevara's share. Dr. William Walsh headed the project, and his report revealed concentrations of lead 100 times the norm in Beethoven's hair, leading many to theorize that lead poisoning contributed to his poor health and perhaps his death.

The history of the lock and the clues it yielded on Beethoven's health have been chronicled in the nonfiction book Beethoven's Hair, by Russell Martin. There was also a documentary of the same name made for Canadian television. In 2005, the documentary won several Gemini Awards, including Best Writing in a Documentary Program or Series and Best Direction in a Performing Arts Program or Series.

=== Instruments ===
The center has several musical instruments on display: an original 1827 Viennese fortepiano, a reproduction of a 1795 Dulcken fortepiano, a clavichord, and a harpsichord. The Dulcken fortepiano, which has a range of 5 octaves over 66 keys, is a copy of an original held by the Smithsonian Institution. Visitors are allowed to play the Dulcken fortepiano, clavichord and harpsichord.
