= Fantasia in C minor, K. 475 =

1785 piano composition for piano by W. A. Mozart

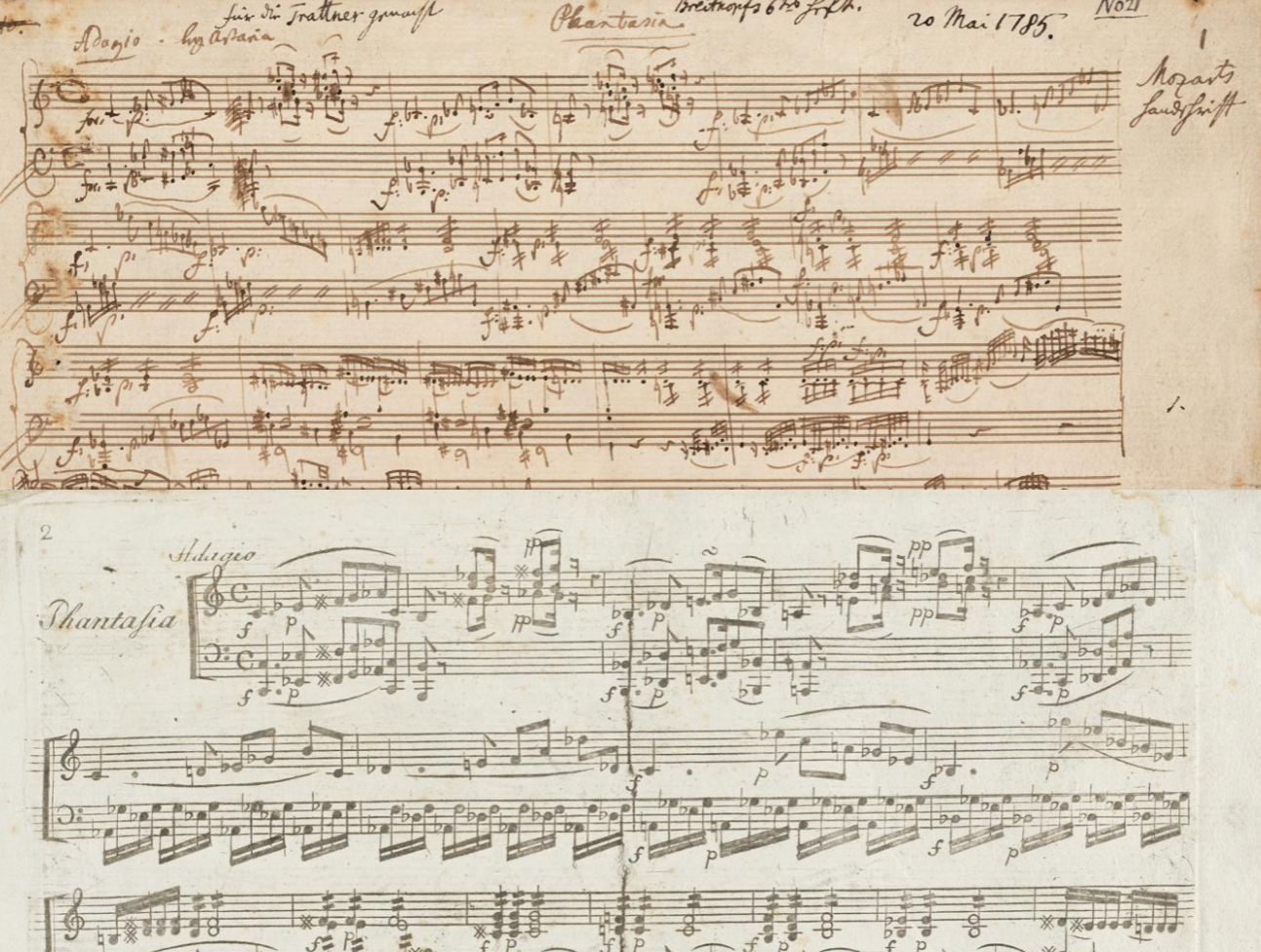
First bars of the autograph and first edition of the fantasy from the International Mozarteum Foundation

MIDI rendition

Fantasia No. 4 in C minor, K. 475 is a composition for solo piano composed by Wolfgang Amadeus Mozart in Vienna on 20 May 1785. It was published as Opus 11 in December 1785, together with the Sonata in C minor, K. 457, the only one of Mozart's piano sonatas to be published together with a work of a different genre.

Starting in the key of C minor, the piece is marked Adagio but then, after a section in D major, moves into an allegro section which goes from A minor to G minor, F major, and then F minor. It then moves into a fourth section in B♭ major marked Andantino and then moves to a più allegro section starting in G minor and modulating through many keys before the opening theme returns in the original key of C minor. Most of the music is written with no sharps or flats in the key signature and uses accidentals—only the fourth section, in B♭ major, is given a key signature.

The autograph manuscript of this composition was auctioned by Sotheby's on 21 November 1990, and is now preserved in the International Mozarteum Foundation.

The Austrian composer Ignaz von Seyfried combined this work with the Sonata in C minor, K. 457, and produced a four-movement arrangement for orchestra, the "Grande Fantaisie" in C minor. Tchaikovsky arranged the Andantino section to a vocal quartet with piano by the name "Night" ("Ночь").

== Recordings ==
Recordings of this work on fortepiano include:

- Paul Badura-Skoda. Mozart. Sonates pour la forte-piano, Tome 4. Label: Astrée, 1989. Fortepiano by Johann Schantz (c. 1790).
- Malcolm Bilson. Mozart. Piano Sonatas: Complete. Label: Hungaroton, 1990. Fortepiano by Paul McNulty (Amsterdam, 1989) after Anton Walter (c. 1795).
- Luc Devos. Mozart. Klavierstücke. Label: Ricercar, 1991. Fortepiano by Claude Kelecom (Bruxelles) after Johann Andreas Stein.
- Ronald Brautigam. Mozart. The Complete Piano Sonatas. Label: BIS Records, 1996. Fortepiano by McNulty (Amsterdam, 1992) after Walter (c. 1795).
- Alexei Lubimov. Mozart. Complete Piano Sonatas. Label: Erato. Fortepiano by Christopher Clarke (1986) after Walter (c. 1795).
- Bart van Oort. Mozart. Label: Brilliant Classics, 2000. Fortepiano by Chris Maene (Ruiselede, 1995) after Walter (c. 1795).
- Andreas Staier. Mozart. Label: Harmonia Mundi, 2003. Fortepiano by Monika May (Marburg, 1986) after Walter (c. 1785).
- Kristian Bezuidenhout. Mozart. Keyboard Music, Vol. 1. Label: Harmonia Mundi, 2009. Fortepiano by Derek Adlam (Welbeck, 1987) after Walter (c. 1795).
- Paul Badura-Skoda. Mozart. Paul Badura-Skoda: A Man and His Music. Label: Kleos Classics. Fortepiano by Walter (1781, Mozart's own).
- Siegbert Rampe. Mozart. Complete Clavier Works, Vol. 1. Label: MD&G, 2004. Fortepiano by Nikolaus Damm (Hirchhorn near Heidelberg, 1990) after Stein (1788).
- Arthur Schoonderwoerd. Mozart. Complete Clavier Sonatas. Label: Accent Records, 2005. Fortepiano by Paul Poletti and Gerard Tuinman after Walter (c. 1790).
- John Khouri. Mozart. Keyboard Works, 1784-1791. Label: San Francisco Fortepiano Society, 2007. Fortepiano by Philip Belt and James Kandik, 1973-1984 after Stein, 1784; pedal board by Kandik, Paul Poletti and Malcolm Rose after instrument from the Metropolitan Museum of Art.
- Anneke Veenhoff. Mozart. Phantasia. Label: Ramée, 2009. Fortepiano by Tuinman (Utrecht, 1993) after Walter (c. 1800).
- Yasuko Uyama-Bouvard. Mozart. Sonates pour pianoforte avec l'accompagnement d'un violon. Label: Éditions Hortus, 2014. Fortepiano by Clarke (2005) after Walter (c. 1790).
- Robert Levin. Mozart. The Piano Sonatas. Label: ECM Records, 2017-2018. Fortepiano by Walter (c. 1782, Mozart's own).
