= Anton Walter =

German piano builder (1752–1826)

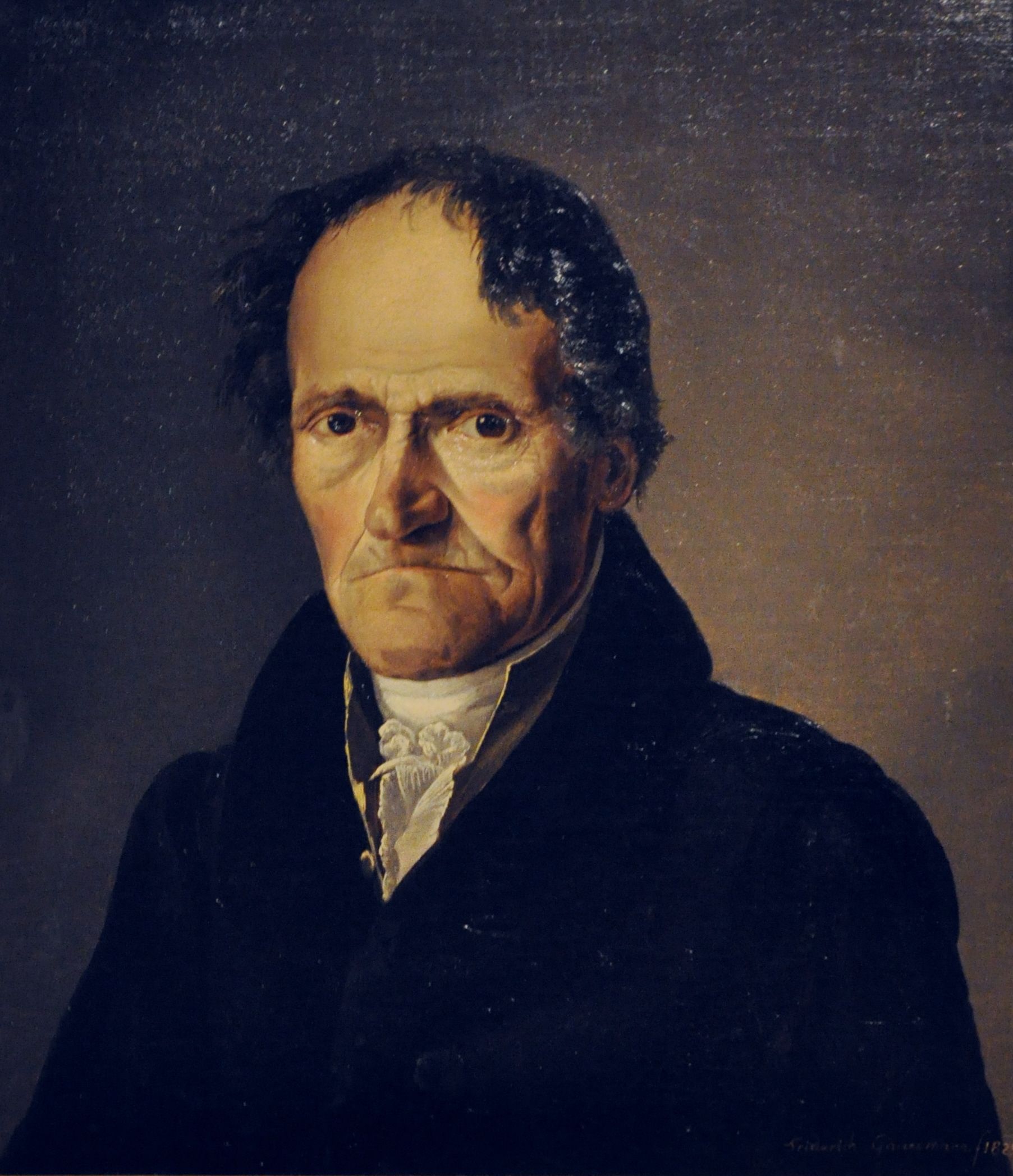
Anton Walter. Oil painting by Friedrich Gauermann, 1825 (Vienna, Kunsthistorisches Museum)

Gabriel Anton Walter (5 February 1752 – 11 April 1826) was a builder of pianos. The Grove Dictionary of Music and Musicians describes him as "the most famous Viennese piano maker of his time". Mozart owned a piano by Walter.

== Life ==
Walter was born in Neuhausen auf den Fildern, Germany. The record of his marriage to a widow named Anna Elisabeth Schöffstoss in 1780 indicates that he had moved to Vienna by that time. His earliest surviving pianos are dated to about 1782.

His piano business was evidently successful. In 1790 he applied for and was given the title Organ and Instrument Maker to the Royal and Imperial Chamber. By 1790 he employed about 20 workmen. In about 1805 the firm's pianos came to be labelled "Anton Walter und Sohn" ("and son"). The last surviving Walter piano is of about 1825. Walter died in 1826.

== Walter's pianos ==
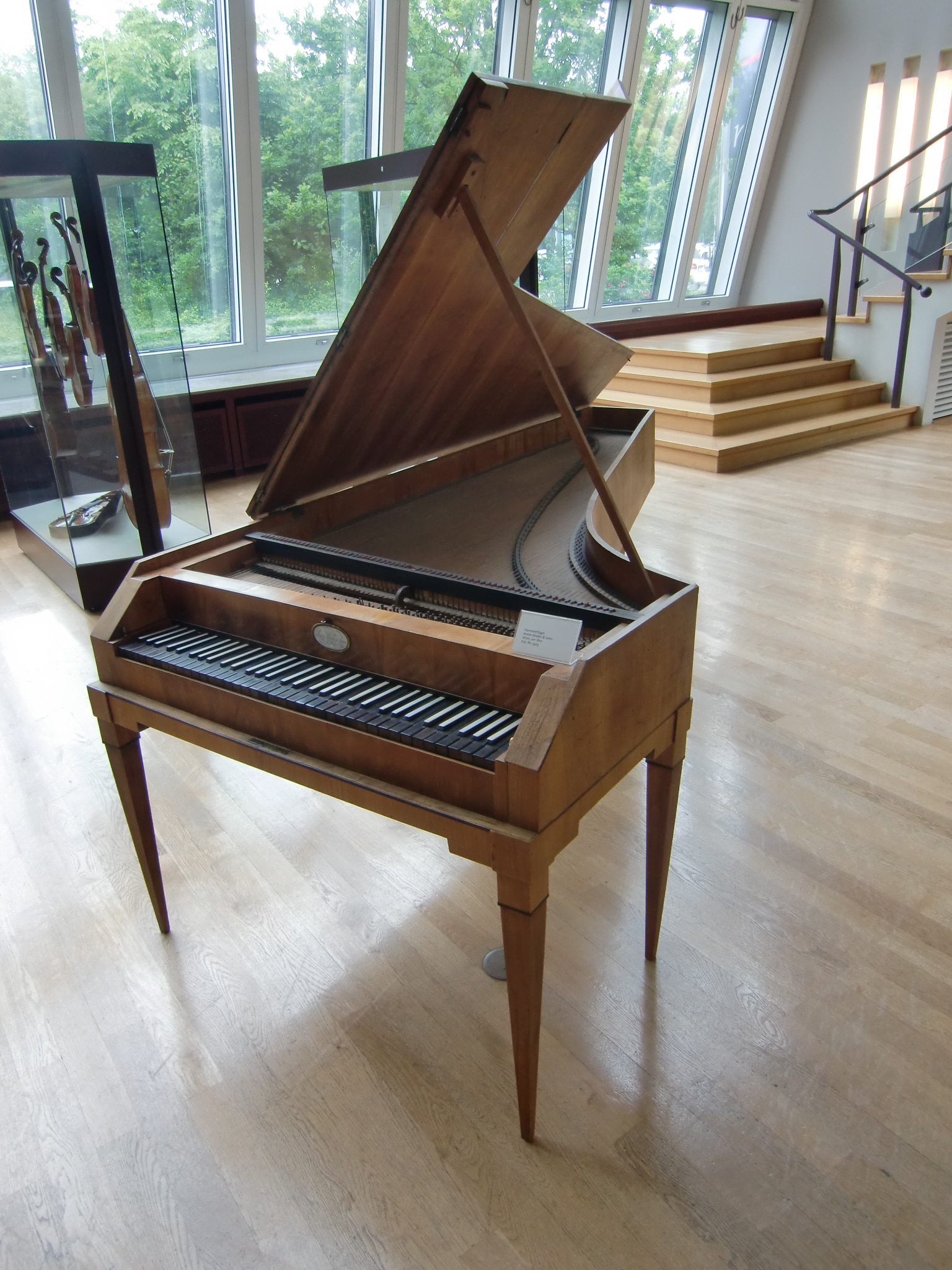
Fortepiano by Anton Walter & Sohn (Vienna, ca. 1805) – Berlin, Musikinstrumentenmuseum

Walter's instruments are classified within the so-called "Viennese" school of piano design. This school originated with Johann Andreas Stein, who built pianos in Augsburg. In pianos with Stein's German action or Walter's modified version, the Viennese action, the head of the hammer pivots in a fork mounted on the key, and the hammer is made to rise when its short distal end is caught on a hook at the back of the action. Like all early pianos, those of the Viennese school were of far lighter construction than modern instruments; for general discussion, see fortepiano.

Walter changed Stein's design in many ways, for instance by adding a so-called back check to the hammer action. The check caught the hammer on its descent after striking the strings. This innovation was generally adopted by other Viennese makers in Walter's time.

Walter's career extended over several decades, and his instruments evolved with the times, with ever heavier construction as the piano began its shift from the lightweight Classical-era norm toward its far heavier modern incarnation, achieved by about 1870. He died in Vienna aged 74.

=== Mozart's instrument ===
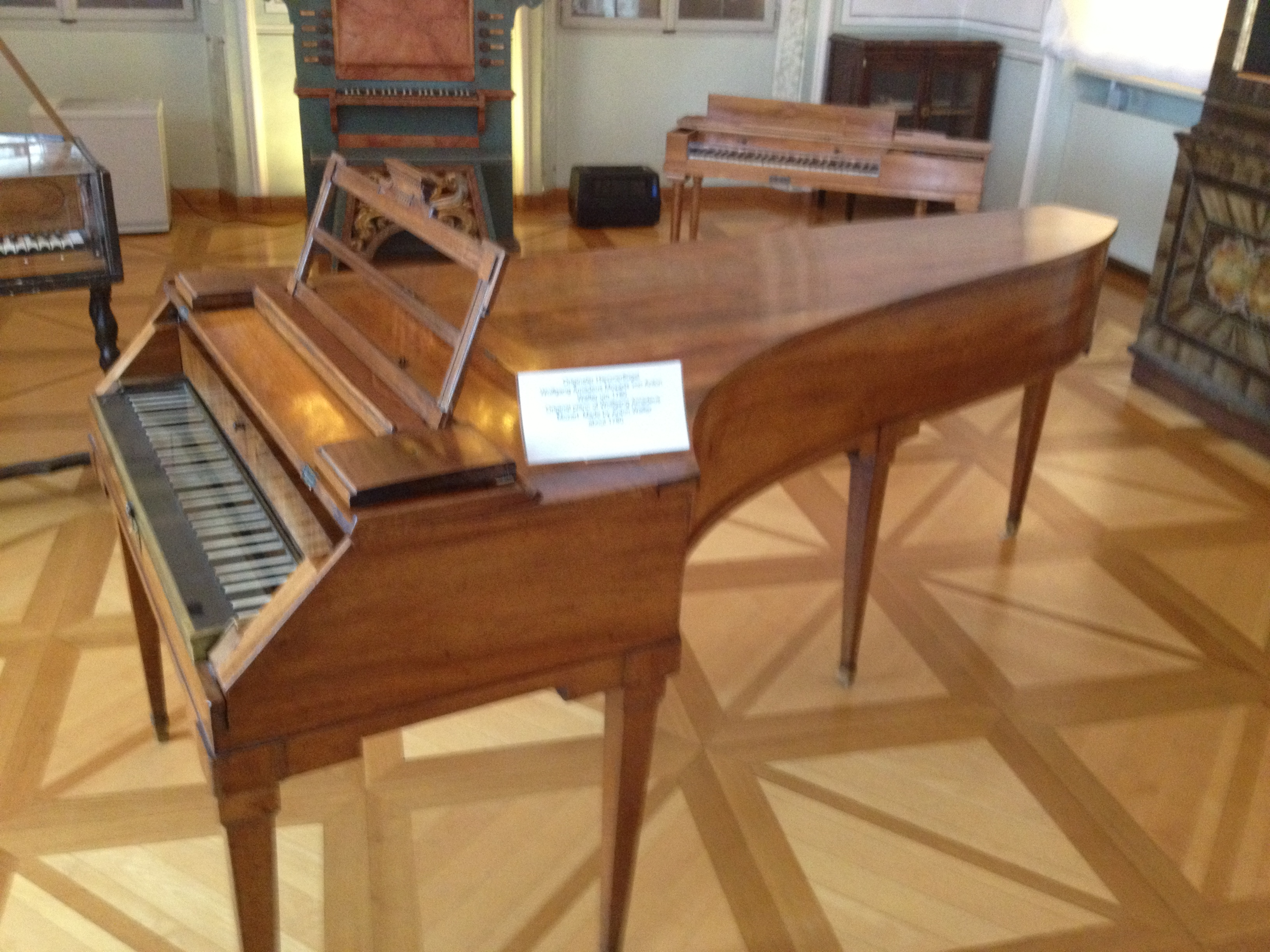
Mozart's Walter, on display in the main hall of the Tanzmeisterhaus, where the Mozart family lived in Salzburg after 1773. The location (now a Mozart museum) is ahistorical; during his lifetime Mozart kept the instrument in his adopted city of Vienna.

Wolfgang Amadeus Mozart acquired a Walter piano in about 1782 and employed it in one of the most important phases of his career, the composition and highly successful premieres of his mature piano concertos (see: Mozart piano concertos). In about 1800 (nine years after Mozart's death), this instrument survives today and is kept in Salzburg, previously owned by Mozart's son Carl in Milan. The instrument probably does not represent the condition it was in when Mozart owned it: the type of hammer mechanism appears to have been changed, altering the touch and probably to some extent the sound as Mozart knew them. Originally the piano had hand levers for the sustaining device. These have been converted to knee levers, perhaps at Mozart's behest: he was used to knee levers for the sustaining device in the Stein pianos he knew and played in Vienna.

=== Surviving Walter pianos ===
The following list is not complete. For more on Walter and his pianos, see the relevant chapter in: Michael Latcham, Pianos for Haydn, Mozart and Beethoven: change and contrast, published by Katzbichler, Munich and Salzburg, 2017

- c. 1782 – Burgenländische Landesmuseum, Eisenstadt, Austria
- c. 1782 – The Mozart instrument, now kept in the composer's birth home in Salzburg
- 1789 – Musical Instrument Museum in Poznań, Poland (part of the collection of National Museum in Poznań)
- c. 1790 – Germanisches Nationalmuseum, Nuremberg. The instrument is veneered in walnut. The museum owns two other pianos by Walter and one by Walter & Son.
- c. 1800 – Rector's Palace, Dubrovnik
- c. 1800 – Villa Cicogna Mozzoni, Italy
- c. 1805 – Musikinstrumenten-Museum, Berlin, Walter & Sohn
- c. 1810 – Württembergisches Landesmuseum, Stuttgart. This instrument has a 6 octave range (FF to f4), an octave more than the standard (FF to f3) of Mozart's day. It is decorated with "gilded caryatids and grillework and medallions in brass."
- c. 1825 – National Museum, Prague.

== Walter's pianos as models for modern builders ==
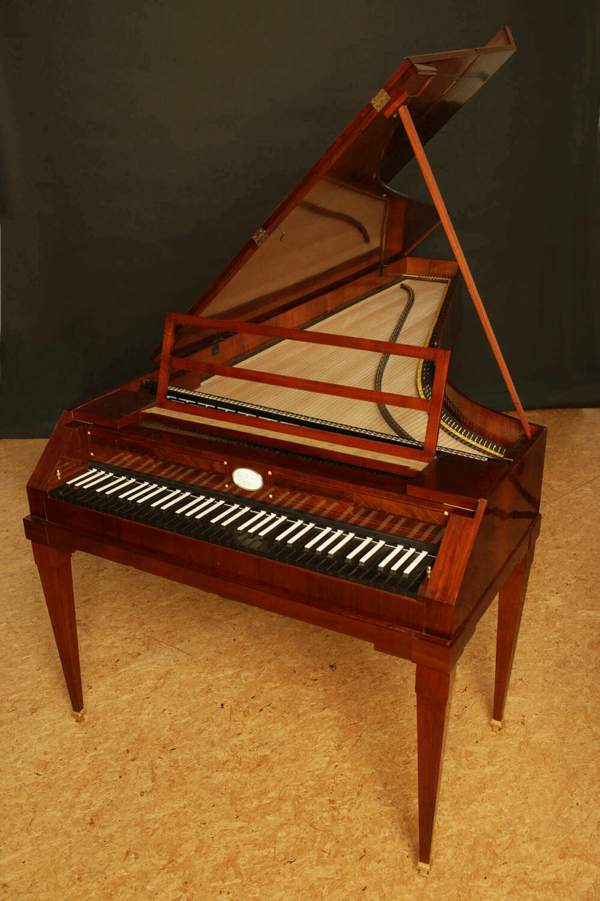
Fortepiano by Paul McNulty, based on a historical instrument by Walter & Sohn, 1805

In modern times, copies of Walter pianos have been made by a number of modern builders. These include (among others) Philip Belt, Christopher Clarke, Chris Maene, Paul McNulty, Paul Poletti, Rodney Regier and Gerard Tuinman.

== Recordings made with originals and replicas of Walter's pianos ==
- Paul Badura-Skoda. Wolfgang Amadeus Mozart. Works for piano. Played on an Anton Walter 1790 piano. Label: Gramola
- Paul Badura-Skoda with Musica Florea. Wolfgang Amadeus Mozart. Piano concertos K.271, K.414. Played on a replica of a Walter instrument made by Paul McNulty
- Malcolm Bilson, John Eliot Gardiner, The English Baroque Soloists. Wolfgang Amadeus Mozart. Piano Concertos Nos. 20&21/ Concertos Pour Piano K. 466 & K.467. Played on a replica of Walter piano by Philip Belt. Label: Archiv Production
- Kristian Bezuidenhout. Wolfgang Amadeus Mozart. Keyboard Music Vol.2 Played on a replica of a Walter instrument made by Paul McNulty.
- Robert Levin with the Academy of Ancient Music, Christopher Hogwood. Wolfgang Amadeus Mozart. Piano Concertos Nos. 15 & 26. Played on Mozart’s own Walter piano.
- Andreas Staier. Joseph Haydn. Sonatas and Variations. Played on a replica of a Walter instrument made by Christopher Clarke
- Viviana Sofronitsky with Warsaw Chamber Opera Orchestra. Wolfgang Amadeus Mozart. Complete Mozart works for keyboard instrument and orchestra (11 CD box). Played on a replica of a Walter instrument made by Paul McNulty
