= Sonya Monosoff =

American violinist (born 1927)

Sonya Monosoff (born June 11, 1927) is a violinist, a pioneer of the Baroque violin and one of the first American performers to use the Baroque violin in performance.

== Biography ==
Born in Cleveland, Ohio, Sonya Monosoff studied the violin with Louis Persinger. She also studied chamber music with Felix Salmond and Hans Letz. A graduate of the Juilliard School of Music, she joined the Quartet Galimir, refounded by Felix Galimir during his exile in America. In 1963 she founded and directed her own ensemble, first called the Baroque Players of New York (later the Chamber Players), performing a range of works from Henry Purcell to Bülent Arel.

In its infancy, Monosoff joined the ensemble New York Pro Musica under Noah Greenberg. She was the first modern performer to record the Rosary Sonatas and the 8 sonatas of 1681 by Heinrich Ignaz Franz Biber. Her recording of the Bach sonatas with harpsichordist James Weaver won best recording of the year (1963) from the Stereo Review magazine.

From 1972 to 1997 she taught at Cornell University. In 1974 she formed the Trio Amade (1974–1997) with fortepianist Malcolm Bilson and cellist John Hsu.

Monosoff has given recitals of chamber music in the US, Canada, Europe, Israel, Australia, New Zealand and Hong Kong.

After 1991 she taught violin and chamber music and gave concerts outside the United States, including the Czech Republic and where she was at the Prague Spring International Music Festival in 1993. She taught and gave master classes in many American and Canadian universities, and was invited to the Bar-Ilan University in Tel Aviv and Ferrara.

== Partial discography ==
Monosoff's discography is currently lacking in CD format reissues, though LP and tape cassette formats are available at many university libraries. In the vein of Baroque performance, she recorded Biber, Arcangelo Corelli, Francesco Geminiani and J. S. Bach. With piano accompaniment, she made recordings of the violin sonatas of Mozart.

Cornell University also keeps archival recordings of Monosoff's many performances at Barnes Hall. For example, her performance on October 7, 1962, of J. S. Bach's trio sonatas, BWV 1038 and from BWV 1079, and her October 29, 1974, performance of Charles Ives' Dialogues for violin and piano (1958) are both available in Cornell's archives.

- 1962: Biber Rosary Sonatas – János Scholz, viola da gamba; John Miller, baroque bassoon; Melville Smith, organ and harpsichord (3 LP Records Cambridge CRS 18113 / LP Pleiades Records 2P107) OCLC 3696813 Performed on instruments from the collection of the Smithsonian Institution (Washington).
- 1962: Mozart Violin Sonatas K 379 and K 454 – Lonny Epstein, fortepiano (Cambridge LP Records) OCLC 53914609
- 1964: Biber, 8 Sonatas for solo violin and continuo (1681) – János Scholz, viola da gamba; Melville Smith, harpsichord (LP Cambridge SRC Records, 1812)
- 1967: Vivaldi, The Four Seasons – Sonya Monosoff, Helen Kwalwasser, Nadia Koutzen, solo violins; Eugenia Earle, harpsichord; New York Sinfonietta Dir. Max Goberman (LP Odyssey 32 16 0131) OCLC 8864104
- 1972: Stephen Foster, Melodies [for Jeannie with the light brown hair and Some folks] – Jan DeGaetani, mezzo-soprano; Leslie Guinn, baritone; Gilbert Kalish, piano and melodeon; Robert Sheldon, flute & keyed bugle; Douglas Koeppe, & piccolo flute; James Weaver, piano; The Camerata Chorus of Washington (LP LP Nonesuch H-71268 / Electra / Nonesuch 9 7915802) OCLC 16575779. Played on instruments from the collection of the Smithsonian Institution (Washington).
- 1973: Corelli, 12 Sonatas, Op. 5 – Judith Davidoff, viola da gamba and cello; James Weaver, harpsichord and organ (3LP Musical Heritage Society MHS 1690/1/2) OCLC 1139307
- 1976: Haydn, Trios, Hob. xv: 19, 27 and 29 – The Trio Amade: Malcolm Bilson, fortepiano; John Hsu, cello (LP Titanic Records Ti-12)
- 1970: Leclair Sonatas for two violins – Sonya Monosoff & Carol Lieberman, baroque violins (LP Titanic Records Ti-45) OCLC 3410651
- 1977: Mozart Violin Sonata K 304, 376, 380 – Malcolm Bilson, fortepiano (ed Southern Illinois University Press – LP Pleiades Records P 104.) OCLC 3027827. Performed on a 1692 Stradivarius from the Metropolitan Museum of Art (New York).
- 1978: Geminiani, Sonatas II and X, opus 1; Sonatas I and XI, opus 4 – James Weaver, harpsichord; Judith Davidoff, baroque cello (LP Musical Heritage Society) OCLC 4652368
- 1978: Bach Sonatas for Violin and Harpsichord BWV 1014–1019, 1021, 1023 – James Weaver, harpsichord; Judith Davidoff, viola da gamba (4–12 April 1978 CRS Records 3LP Cambridge 2822B / LP Columbia Special Products P3-14830) OCLC 5512187. Played on instruments from the collection of the Smithsonian Institution (Washington).

== Publications ==
=== Articles ===
- Monosoff, Sonya (1977). "Viva the Early Violin". The Journal of the Violin Society of America (3/1): 17–21.
- with Salchow, William; Joseph Siegelman; Sergiu Luca (1977). "Symposium: The Performer and the Bow". Journal of the Violin Society of America (3): 11–34.
- — (1977). "Symposium: The Past and Present Baroque Bow". The Journal of the Violin Society of America (3/4): 35–86.
- — (February 1985). "Violin Fingering [Review Violin fingering in the 18th century by Peter Walls]". Early Music (13): 76–79. doi:10.1093/earlyj/13.1.76.
- Articles "Arco (i)", "Pizzicato", "Position", "Shift", "Fingering" in Grove Music Online

=== Collaboration ===
- David Dodge Boyden; Malcolm Boyd; Sonya Monosoff; et al. (1989). "Violoncello: evolution, technology, interpreters and repertoire of the cello". The Violin Family. New York: W. W. Norton. p. 315. ISBN 039302556X. OCLC 21598139.
