= C minor =

Minor scale based on C

- Relative key: E-flat major
- Parallel key: C major
- Dominant key: G minor
- Subdominant key: F minor

Component pitches
- C, D, E♭, F, G, A♭, B♭

C minor is a minor scale based on C, consisting of the pitches C, D, E♭, F, G, A♭, and B♭. Its key signature consists of three flats. Its relative major is E♭ major and its parallel major is C major.

The C natural minor scale is:

Changes needed for the melodic and harmonic versions of the scale are written in with accidentals as necessary. The C harmonic minor and melodic minor scales are:

== Scale degree chords ==
The scale degree chords of C minor are:

- Tonic – C minor
- Supertonic – D diminished
- Mediant – E-flat major
- Subdominant – F minor
- Dominant – G minor
- Submediant – A-flat major
- Subtonic – B-flat major

== Notable compositions ==
- Charles-Valentin Alkan
  - Prelude Op. 31, No. 16 (Assez lentement)
  - Symphony for Solo Piano, 1st movement: Allegro
  - Trois grandes études, Op. 76, No. 3 "Mouvement semblable et perpetuel"
- Johannes Sebastian Bach
  - Passacaglia and Fugue in C minor, BWV 582
  - Lute Suite in C minor, BWV 997
  - Cello Suite No. 5, BWV 1011
  - The Musical Offering, BWV 1079
  - Partita No. 2, BWV 826
- Ludwig van Beethoven (See Beethoven and C minor)
  - Piano Sonata No. 5
  - Piano Sonata No. 8 (Pathétique)
  - Piano Concerto No. 3
  - Coriolan Overture
  - Symphony No. 5
  - Choral Fantasy
  - Piano Sonata No. 32
- Johannes Brahms
  - Symphony No. 1
  - String Quartet Op. 51/1
  - Piano Trio No. 3
  - Piano Quartet No. 3
- Anton Bruckner
  - Symphony No. 1
  - Symphony No. 2
  - Symphony No. 8
- Frédéric Chopin
  - Rondo Op. 1
  - Piano Sonata No. 1
  - Étude Op. 10, No. 12 (Revolutionary)
  - Étude Op. 25, No. 12 (Ocean)
  - Prélude Op. 28, No. 20 "Funeral March"
  - Nocturne in C minor, Op. 48, No. 1
  - Nocturne in C minor, Op. posth. (Chopin)
  - Mazurka Op. 56, No. 3
- Gabriel Fauré
  - Élégie, Op. 24
- Joseph Haydn
  - Piano Sonata Hob. XVI/20
- Franz Liszt
  - Transcendental Étude No. 8 "Wilde Jagd"
- Gustav Mahler
  - Symphony No. 2 "Auferstehung"
- Felix Mendelssohn
  - Piano Trio in C minor, MWV Q3
  - Symphony No. 1
  - Organ Sonata, Op. 65, No. 2
- Wolfgang Amadeus Mozart
  - Great Mass in C minor, K. 427 (417a)
  - Piano Concerto No. 24, K. 491)
  - Maurerische Trauermusik K. 477 (479a)
  - Als Luise die Briefe ihres ungetreuen Liebhabers verbrannte, K. 517
  - Adagio and Fugue in C minor. K. 546
  - Wind Serenade in C minor. K. 388 (384a)
  - Fantasy in C minor for violin and piano, K. 396 (385f)
  - Piano Sonata in C minor, K. 457
  - Fantasy in C minor, K. 475
  - Kleiner Trauermarsch, K. 453a
- Sergei Prokofiev
  - Symphony No. 3, Op. 44
- Sergei Rachmaninoff
  - Piano Concerto No. 2
- Camille Saint-Saëns
  - Symphony No. 3 (Organ Symphony)
- Dmitri Shostakovich
  - String Quartet No. 8
  - Symphony No. 4
  - Symphony No. 8
- Franz Schubert
  - Symphony No. 4, D. 417
  - Piano Sonata No. 19, D. 958
  - Impromptu No. 1, D. 899

== See also ==
- Key (music)
- Major and minor
- Chord (music)
- Chord notation

No.	Flats		Sharps	
No.	Major	minor	Major	minor
0	C	a	C	a
1	F	d	G	e
2	B♭	g	D	b
3	E♭	c	A	f♯
4	A♭	f	E	c♯
5	D♭	b♭	B	g♯
6	G♭	e♭	F♯	d♯
7	C♭	a♭	C♯	a♯
8	F♭	d♭	G♯	e♯
