= Fantasia No. 2 (Mozart) =

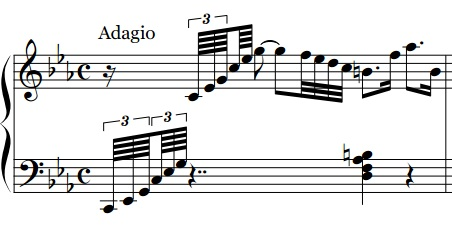
Bar 1, featuring triplet sixty-fourth notes (hemidemisemiquavers)

Fantasia No. 2 in C minor, K. 396/385f (German: Fragment einer Fantasie in c) is a fragment of a violin sonata composed by Wolfgang Amadeus Mozart in Vienna in August or September 1782.

Its tempo marking is adagio. The fragment consists of 27 bars, the violin part entering at bar 23.

Maximilian Stadler later composed a "completion" of the work for solo piano which is 70 bars long and ends in C major. A copy of the piece in Stadler's hand contains a dedication to Constanze Mozart. It is this version which is usually performed and recorded. "The authorship of the stormy development section is unclear; it has not been determined whether Stadler had Mozart's sketch for this section which has since been lost or it was completely his own creation."

== See also ==
- Fantasia No. 3
- Fantasia No. 4
