= Malcolm Bilson =

American pianist and musicologist

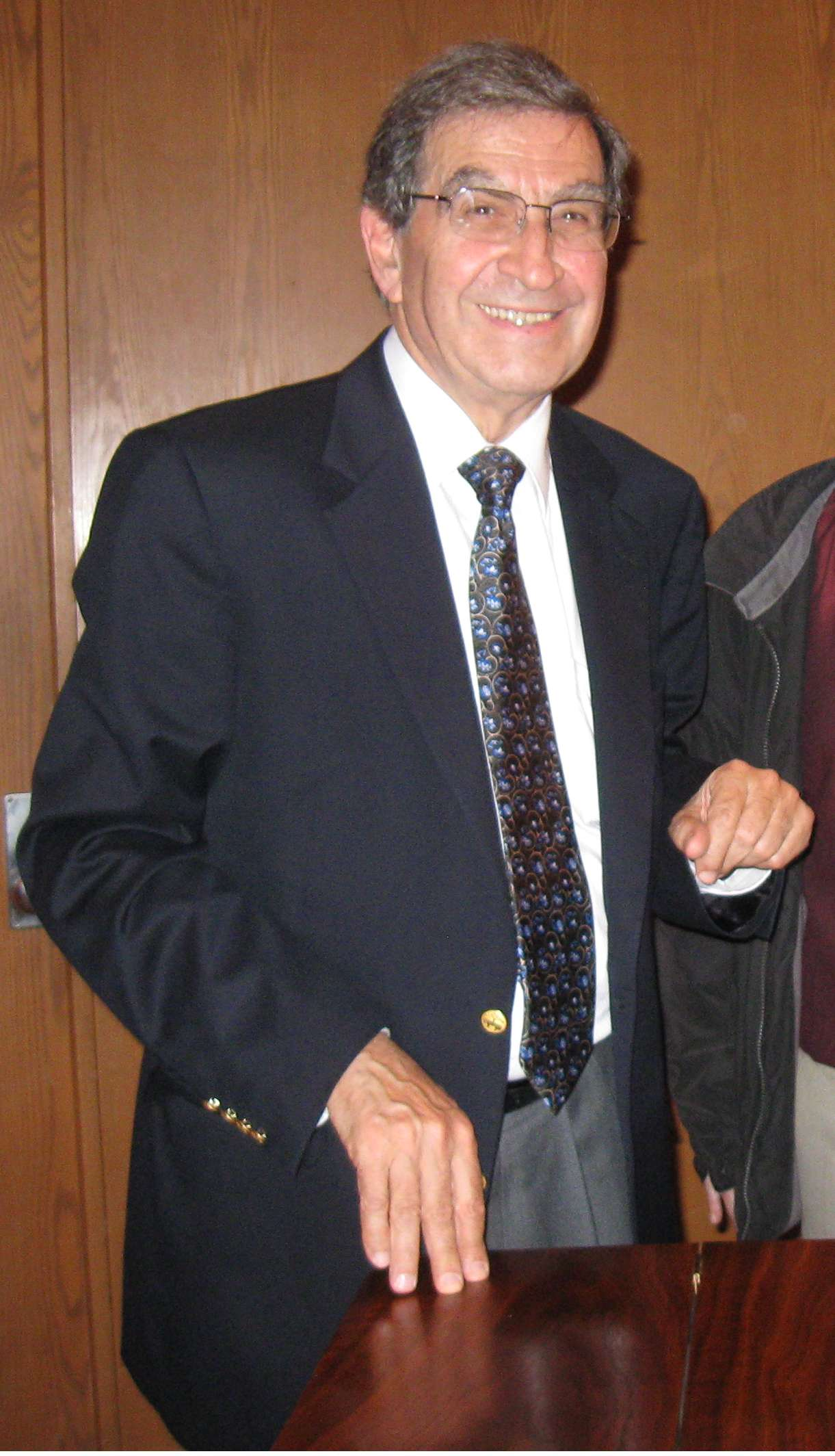
Malcolm Bilson in a masterclass at the University of Michigan, Ann Arbor, in 2009.

Malcolm Bilson (born October 24, 1935) is an American pianist and musicologist specializing in 18th- and 19th-century music. He is the Frederick J. Whiton Professor of Music in Cornell University, Ithaca, New York. Bilson is one of the foremost players and teachers of the fortepiano; this is the ancestor of the modern piano and was the instrument used in Haydn, Mozart, and Beethoven's time.

== Life ==
=== Early life and career ===
Bilson was born in Los Angeles, California. His family was and is successful in the entertainment world: his father, George Bilson (1902–1981), was a British producer/writer/director of Ashkenazi Jewish extraction originally from Leeds, and his older brother Bruce Bilson had a long and productive career as a film and television director; other relations (descendants of Bruce) are his nephew Danny Bilson and grandniece Rachel Bilson. (Note: For details and references, see Bruce Bilson.)

Malcolm Bilson graduated from Bard College in 1957. (Note: Winter, n.d.) He continued his studies with Grete Hinterhofer at the Akademie für Musik und Darstellende Kunst in Berlin, later with Reine Gianoli at the École Normale de Musique de Paris. He studied for a doctoral degree at the University of Illinois with Stanley Fletcher and Webster Aitken, obtaining his DMA in 1968. At that time he was appointed as an assistant professor at Cornell.

=== His encounter with the fortepiano ===
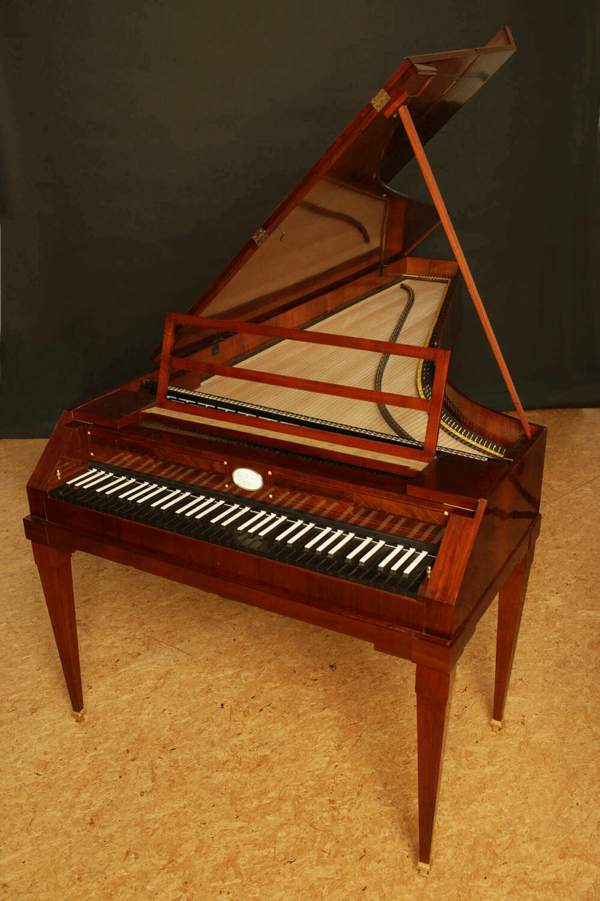
A modern fortepiano built by Paul McNulty in imitation of a historical instrument by Anton Walter. The smaller size, smaller range, and lighter construction of the fortepiano, relative to the modern grand, can be seen.

Arguably the key event in Bilson's career was his first encounter with the fortepiano in 1969, which he narrated to Andrew Willis in a 2006 interview. Interested in historical pianos, he had bought a 19th-century instrument, described to him as a "Mozart piano," and was referred to Philip Belt, an expert on early pianos, about the possibility of restoring it:

I wrote Belt and sent some pictures, and Belt wrote back that yes, he could do that, but [my piano] wasn't at all a piano from Mozart's time. And as a matter of fact, he had just built such a piano, after Louis Dulcken, c. 1785, and he wanted to take it around to show at colleges and music schools. So I said fine, bring it, and I'll play a concert on it. He brought it and left it for a week, and I played an all-Mozart concert ... with K. 330 and the B minor Adagio and the Kleine Gigue, [as well as] the G minor piano quartet with some modern string players at 440. (Note: 440 Hz. is standard modern concert pitch; concert pitch was lower in Mozart's time and one aspect of historically informed performance is to employ older pitch standards.)

In preparing for this concert, Bilson was startled by the challenges—and opportunities—that playing a fortepiano poses to a traditionally-trained pianist (fortepianos have a far more delicate touch, shallower key dip, lighter framing, and shorter sustain time than modern grands.)

I have to admit now that I really couldn't handle the thing at all. I must be the least gifted person for the job; my hands are too big, and I don't have the necessary technique such an instrument required. In trying to operate this light, precise mechanism, I really felt like an elephant in a china closet. But I kept at it all week and practiced hard and after several days began to notice that I was actually playing what was on the page. What I had been doing before was simply playing legato and pedaling through. I saw the slurs, but, of course, I didn't want to create hiccups, which can happen so easily on the modern piano. Suddenly I found that I really didn't need much pedal and that the articulative pauses actually made the music more expressive. (Note: Bilson demonstrates these stylistic differences in detail in his video "Knowing the Score", described below.) At the concert at the end of that first week, which was absolutely filled to overflowing, there was great enthusiasm. Nobody had ever seen such a thing. I thought to myself that this was an opportunity to do something useful with my talents. This was in 1969, and I decided to buy one of these pianos and to seriously pursue playing it. For several years I took the instrument [also by Belt] around and played it in colleges and small venues. It was, of course, viewed as a curiosity back then, and some people thought I was a bit crazy. I knew I was doing something fringe-y, but I also thought it was important and worth doing because there were aspects of this music that nobody could hear any more.

=== Career as fortepiano specialist ===
The career shift ultimately proved successful; Bilson developed a reputation as a fortepiano performer, gave concerts widely and was also invited to make recordings (see below). In 1974, he co-founded the Amadé Trio with violinist Sonya Monosoff and cellist John Hsu; the trio performed works on historical instruments.

Bilson was promoted to full professor in 1976 and was appointed to the Frederick J. Whiton chair in 1990.

Bilson retired in 2006 as a professor, remaining active as a teacher and performer.

In 2011, Bilson brought the first fortepiano competition to the United States. Coordinated under the Westfield Center, with a grant from the Mellon Foundation, the competition and academy were held at Cornell University; 31 young musicians from all over the world competed for prize money totaling $13,500.

== Pedagogy and scholarship ==
Bilson created a DVD, "Knowing the Score," which questions many of the basic concepts of musical performance taught in conservatories and music schools around the world, specifically, the lack of adherence to notated articulations and assumptions about the length of rhythmic values. He followed up this DVD with two more: "Performing the Score," with violinist Elizabeth Field, and "Knowing the Score, Vol. 2."

Bilson has published several articles on the subject of interpreting late 18th- and early 19th-century compositions by Schubert, Mozart and Beethoven in Early Music and Studia Musicologica Academiae Scientiarum Hungaricae.

== Recordings ==
- Malcolm Bilson, Tom Beghin, David Breitman, Ursula Dütschler, Zvi Meniker, Bart van Oort, Andrew Willis. Ludwig van Beethoven. The complete Piano Sonatas on Period Instruments. Played on original fortepianos: Salvatore Lagrassa 1815, Gottlieb Hafner 1835, Johann Fritz 1825, Walter fortepiano copy by Paul McNulty, Walter copies by Chris Maene, Johann Schantz copy by Thomas and Barbara Wolf, a Walter and Conrad Graf 1825 copies by Rodney Regier, Label: Claves. These recordings use a set of nine restored or replica pianos, each of a type contemporaneous with the sonata being performed.
- Malcolm Bilson, John Eliot Gardiner, The English Baroque Soloists. Wolfgang Amadeus Mozart, Piano Concertos Nos. 20&21/ Concertos Pour Piano K. 466 & K.467. Played on a replica of Walter fortepiano by Philip Belt. Label: Archiv Produktion.
- Malcolm Bilson. Franz Josef Haydn. Keyboard Sonatas. Played on a replica of Walter fortepiano by Philip Belt. Label: Titanic Records.
- Malcolm Bilson. Franz Schubert — Complete Piano Sonatas Played on Conrad Graf ca.1835 fortepiano. Label: Hungaraton Classics.
- Malcolm Bilson, Anner Bylsma. Ludwig van Beethoven. Fortepiano and Cello Sonatas. Played on Alois Graff 1825 fortepiano. Label: Elektra Nonesuch.
- Malcolm Bilson and Robert Levin. Franz Schubert - Music for Piano 4 Hands. Played on Conrad Graf ca.1830 fortepiano. Label: Archiv Produktion.

== Assessment ==
Fortepiano builder Carey Beebe assesses Bilson's influence as follows:

Malcolm Bilson, who began after 'the Father of the Fortepiano', Phil[ip] Belt, dropped around one of his first reproduction instruments to try, still provides great impetus to modern makers. His Fortepiano Summer Schools in the 1980s were an inspiration, and many of the musicians who attended those schools, along with his Doctoral graduates, have spread the word around the globe. Bilson's DG Archiv recordings of the complete Mozart Concerti were a milestone.

== Bilson's instruments ==
- (acquired 1969) a fortepiano by Philip Belt, based on a Louis Dulcken original in the Smithsonian Institution
- (acquired 1977) a copy by Philip Belt of Mozart's concert instrument. The original was built by Anton Walter ca. 1782 and is now kept in the Mozarteum in Salzburg
- 1825 fortepiano by Alois Graf
- Leschen 1825
- (acquired 2017) a copy of Johann Fritz's piano made by Paul McNulty
- (acquired 2020) a copy of Gottfried Silbermann’s 1749 made by Paul McNulty

== Honors ==
The main-belt asteroid 7387 Malbil, discovered 1982, is named in his honor.

In 1994 Bilson was elected a Fellow of the American Academy of Arts and Sciences.

In 2015 he was awarded the Hungarian Gold Cross of Merit for his contribution to Hungarian intellectual and cultural life.

== Bibliography ==
Publications by Malcolm Bilson:

- "Schubert's Piano Music and the Pianos of his Time," Studia Musicologica Academiae Scientiarum Hungaricae 22 (1980), 263-71.
- "The Viennese Fortepiano of the Late 18th Century," Early Music (April 1980), 158-62. (abstract)
- "Interpreting Mozart," Early Music (November 1984), 519-22.
- "Execution and Expression in the Sonata in E-flat, K282," Early Music (May 1992), 237-43.
- "The Future of Schubert Interpretation: What Is Really Needed?" Early Music 25 (1997), 715-722
- "Beyond the Musical Fringe, a Sequel," EMAg (The Magazine of Early Music America) 21/3 (Fall 2015), 16-19.
