= Piano Trio in C minor, MWV Q3 (Mendelssohn) =

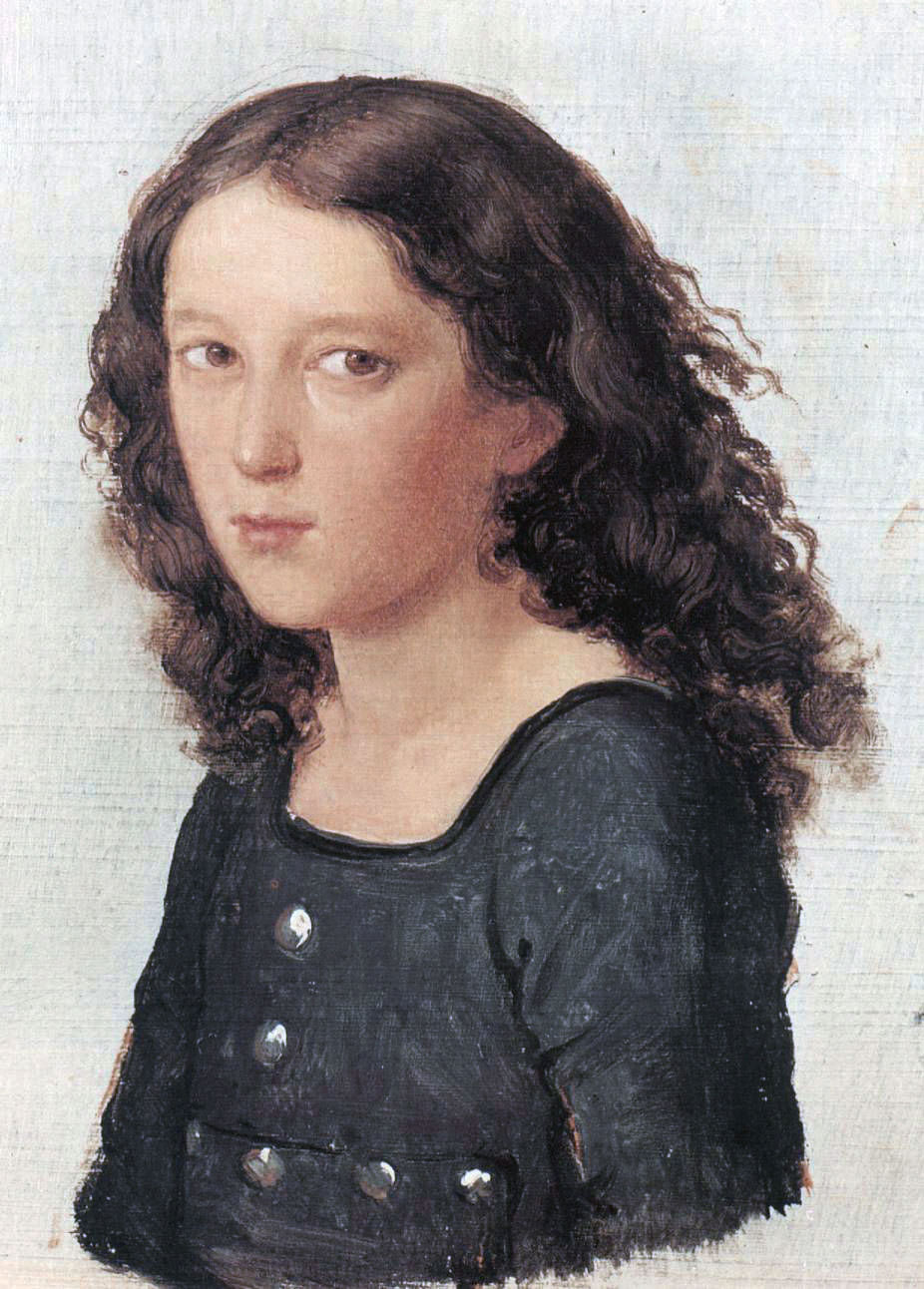
Felix Mendelssohn aged 12 (1821) by Carl Joseph Begas

The Piano Trio in C minor, MWV Q3, is a chamber work by Felix Mendelssohn. It was composed in 1820 and published posthumously in 1970. Unlike many other piano trios, this work is scored for piano, violin and viola. In key, all the movements are in minor, ending also in minor. Among the works by Mendelssohn, this is one of those least performed and recorded.

== Movements ==
The piano trio has four movements:

1. Allegro (in C minor & sonata form, secondary theme in the exposition in E♭ major)
2. Scherzo (in G minor & ternary form, middle section in G major)
3. Adagio (in F minor & sonata form, secondary theme in the exposition in E♭ major)
4. Allegro (in C minor & sonata form, secondary theme in the exposition in E♭ major)

The scherzo is in modified "minuet & trio" form, where the main scherzo features an extra introduction. In other words, the overall form can be represented as "Scherzo (ABBCC) - Trio (DDEE) - Scherzo da Capo (ABC)".
