= 7387 Malbil =

Main-belt asteroid

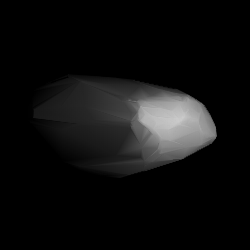
- Shape model of Malbil from its lightcurve

Discovery
- Discovered by: E. Bowell
- Discovery site: Anderson Mesa Stn.
- Discovery date: 30 January 1982

Designations
- Named after: Malcolm Bilson (American pianist)
- Alternative designations: 1982 BS_{1}
- Minor planet category: main-belt · (inner); background

Orbital characteristics
- Epoch 4 September 2017 (JD 2458000.5)
- Uncertainty parameter 0
- Observation arc: 35.44 yr (12,946 days)
- Aphelion: 2.8283 AU
- Perihelion: 2.0728 AU
- Semi-major axis: 2.4506 AU
- Eccentricity: 0.1542
- Orbital period (sidereal): 3.84 yr (1,401 days)
- Mean anomaly: 139.08°
- Mean motion: 0° 15^{m} 24.84^{s} / day
- Inclination: 7.0546°
- Longitude of ascending node: 151.07°
- Argument of perihelion: 295.00°

Physical characteristics
- Mean diameter: 6.3 km (est. at 0.20)
- Synodic rotation period: 7.5498 h
- Pole ecliptic latitude: (253°, −74°) (λ_{1}/β_{1}); (127.0°, −69.0°) (λ_{2}/β_{2})
- Absolute magnitude (H): 13.4

7387 Malbil (prov. designation: 1982 BS_{1}) is an elongated background asteroid from the inner regions of the asteroid belt. It was discovered on 30 January 1982, by American astronomer Edward Bowell at Lowell's Anderson Mesa Station in Arizona, United States. The asteroid has a rotation period of 7.5 hours and measures approximately 6 kilometers (4 miles) in diameter. It is named for American pianist Malcolm Bilson.

== Classification and orbit ==
Malbil is a non-family asteroid of the main belt's background population when applying the hierarchical clustering method to its proper orbital elements. It orbits the Sun in the inner main-belt at a distance of 2.1–2.8 AU once every 3 years and 10 months (1,401 days). Its orbit has an eccentricity of 0.15 and an inclination of 7° with respect to the ecliptic. The body's observation arc begins with its first used observation at the discovering observatory in 1986, or 4 years after its official discovery observation.

== Naming ==
This minor planet was named after American fortepianist and musicologist Malcolm Bilson (born 1935), who gave a recital at the "Asteroids, Comets, Meteors" conference at Cornell University in New York. The approved naming citation was published by the Minor Planet Center on 28 July 1999 (M.P.C. 35485).

== Physical characteristics ==
As of 2020, Malbil's effective size, its composition and albedo remain unknown. Data from photometric observation gave a modeled sidereal rotation period of 7.5498 hours and two spin axes at (253°, −74°) and (127.0°, −69.0°) in ecliptic coordinates (λ, β). The modeling suggests that the asteroid is rather elongated in shape.

Based on a magnitude-to-diameter conversion, its generic diameter is between 5 and 12 kilometer for an absolute magnitude of 13.4, and an assumed albedo in the range of 0.05 to 0.25. Since asteroids in the inner main-belt are typically of stony rather than carbonaceous composition, with albedos of 0.20 or higher, Malbil's diameter can be estimate to measure around 6.3 kilometers, as the higher its albedo (reflectivity), the lower the body's diameter at a constant absolute magnitude (brightness).
