= Steven Lubin =

American pianist and musical scholar (born 1942)

- Steven Lubin in 2005

Background information
- Born: 1942 (age 83–84); Brooklyn, New York City
- Genre: Classical music
- Occupation: Pianist
- Instrument: Fortepiano

Steven Lubin (born 1942) is an American pianist and musical scholar. He is best known for his performances on the fortepiano, the early version of the piano.

== Studies ==
Lubin was born in Brooklyn, New York City. He studied piano with Lisa Grad, Nadia Reisenberg, Seymour Lipkin, Rosina Lhévinne and Beveridge Webster, and viola with Florence Nicolaides. He attended New York's High School of Music & Art; graduated from Harvard College, majoring in philosophy; he earned a master's degree in piano at the Juilliard School; and he completed his Ph.D. in musicology at New York University, where he wrote a dissertation entitled Techniques for the Analysis of Development in Middle-Period Beethoven.

== Period performance ==
A subspecialty of Lubin's is his approach to performing the keyboard works of the Viennese Classical composers (Mozart, Haydn, Beethoven and Schubert) on replicas of the historic instruments actually used by the composers. Such instruments are often generically called fortepianos. In the 1960s, Lubin frequented the New Hampshire workshop of Philip Belt, a pioneering American builder of fortepiano replicas, and became curious how Mozart's piano concertos would have sounded on these instruments in their original performances. In the mid 1970s, he built a fortepiano replica of his own, with the help of a piano technician friend, Lee Morton, who had served as Belt's apprentice. At his debut recital at Carnegie Recital Hall in 1977, Lubin performed Mozart works on his fortepiano, along with a large-scale Chopin work on the modern grand. (More recently, he uses instruments by expert builders, particularly those of Rodney Regier of Freeport, Maine.)

Subsequently, he organized a period-instrument Mozart orchestra, The Mozartean Players, and presented, throughout the 1980s, a series of period performances of Mozart piano concertos in major New York halls. At these performances Lubin conducted and played the solo parts. Arabesque Records recorded a series these works, and a new release from among the performances of this era has appeared in 2006 on the Classical Soundings label.

Lubin has made concert tours in North America, Europe and Australia.

== Recordings ==
As a recording artist Lubin has made 20 CDs for Decca, Harmonia Mundi USA, Arabesque and Classical Soundings.

In 1987, Decca Records in London engaged Lubin to record and perform the cycle of Beethoven piano concertos on period instruments, in collaboration with the Academy of Ancient Music directed by Christopher Hogwood. These recordings have been reissued by Decca in 2006. In addition to other recordings for Decca, Lubin has made CDs for Harmonia Mundi USA of the complete trios and piano quartets of Mozart, and of Schubert's trios. These recordings were issued by The Mozartean Players in trio format, where Lubin was joined by Stanley Ritchie, violin, and Myron Lutzke, cello. Anca Nicolau is currently the violinist of the trio.

On the modern piano in recent years Lubin has appeared both as a solo recitalist and concerto soloist.

== Writings ==
Lubin writes frequently on musical subjects. In his Ph.D. dissertation (1974), he pointed out that (1) a fruitful way of understanding 18th-century European music follows from the recognition that the composers of that era inhabited a special, abstract, communally shared harmonic space (nowadays sometimes called modulatory space) that existed independently of individual works; (2) that the internal features of this space underwent evolutionary change in the course of the 18th century; (3) that a graphic depiction of this space could be used as a map to trace the various routes composers used to navigate about in their cosmos, and that their designs for these routes constitute an important aspect of the effect and beauty of their large-scale works; and (4) that in the later 18th century, for reasons arising out of the geometry of key-relations employed by composers, their abstract background space took the form of a torus (donut). A fertile sub-field of music theory has recently elaborated a complex of ideas related to these. Among the leading American proponents acknowledging Lubin's contribution in this area are Richard Cohn, Fred Lerdahl and Edward Gollin.

== Teaching ==
Lubin has taught at the Juilliard School, Vassar College, Cornell University (where he was head of the theory program) and at Purchase College SUNY), where he is currently a distinguished professor.
