= Martin Skowroneck =

German harpsichord builder

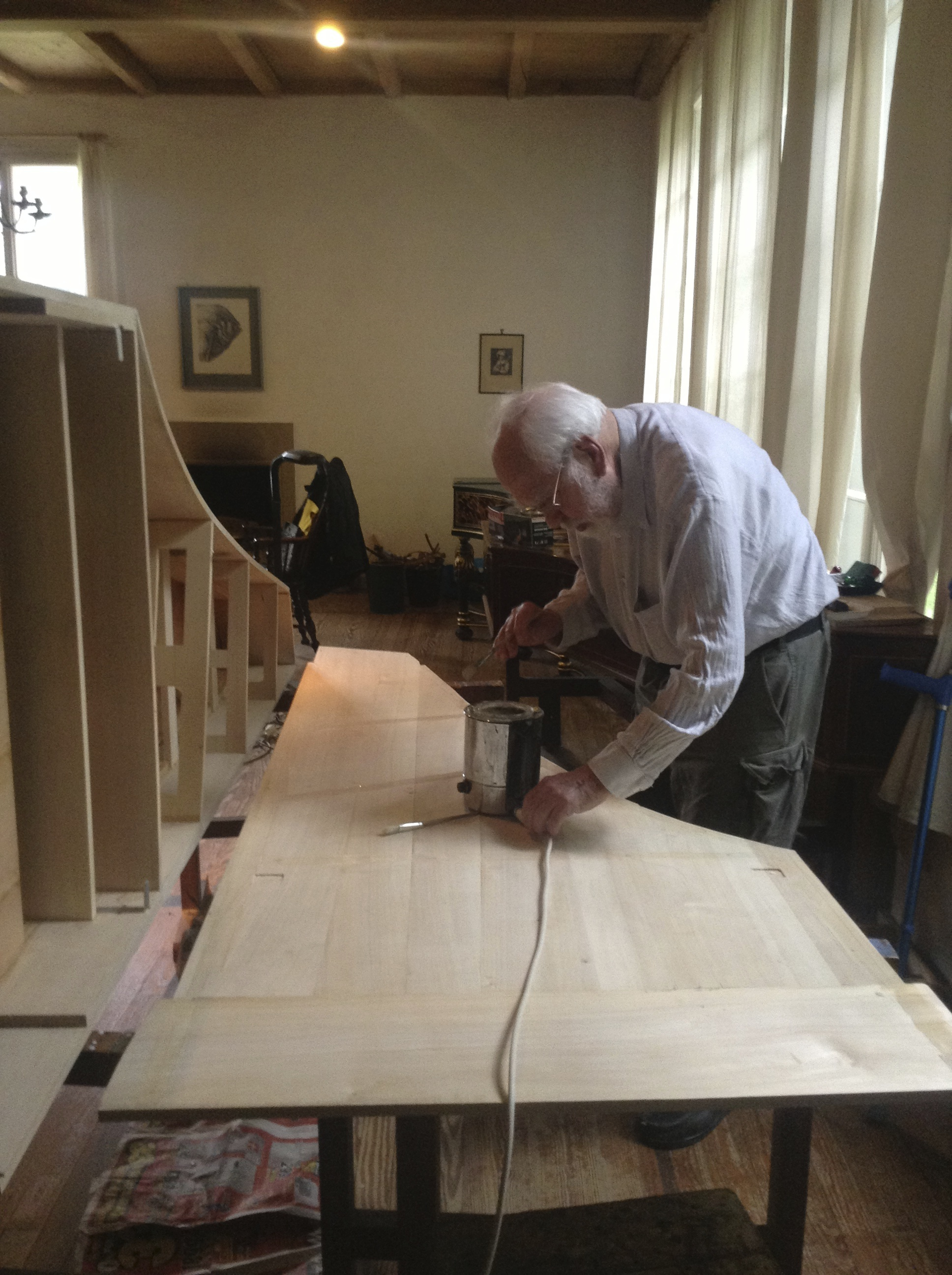
Martin Skowroneck in 2013

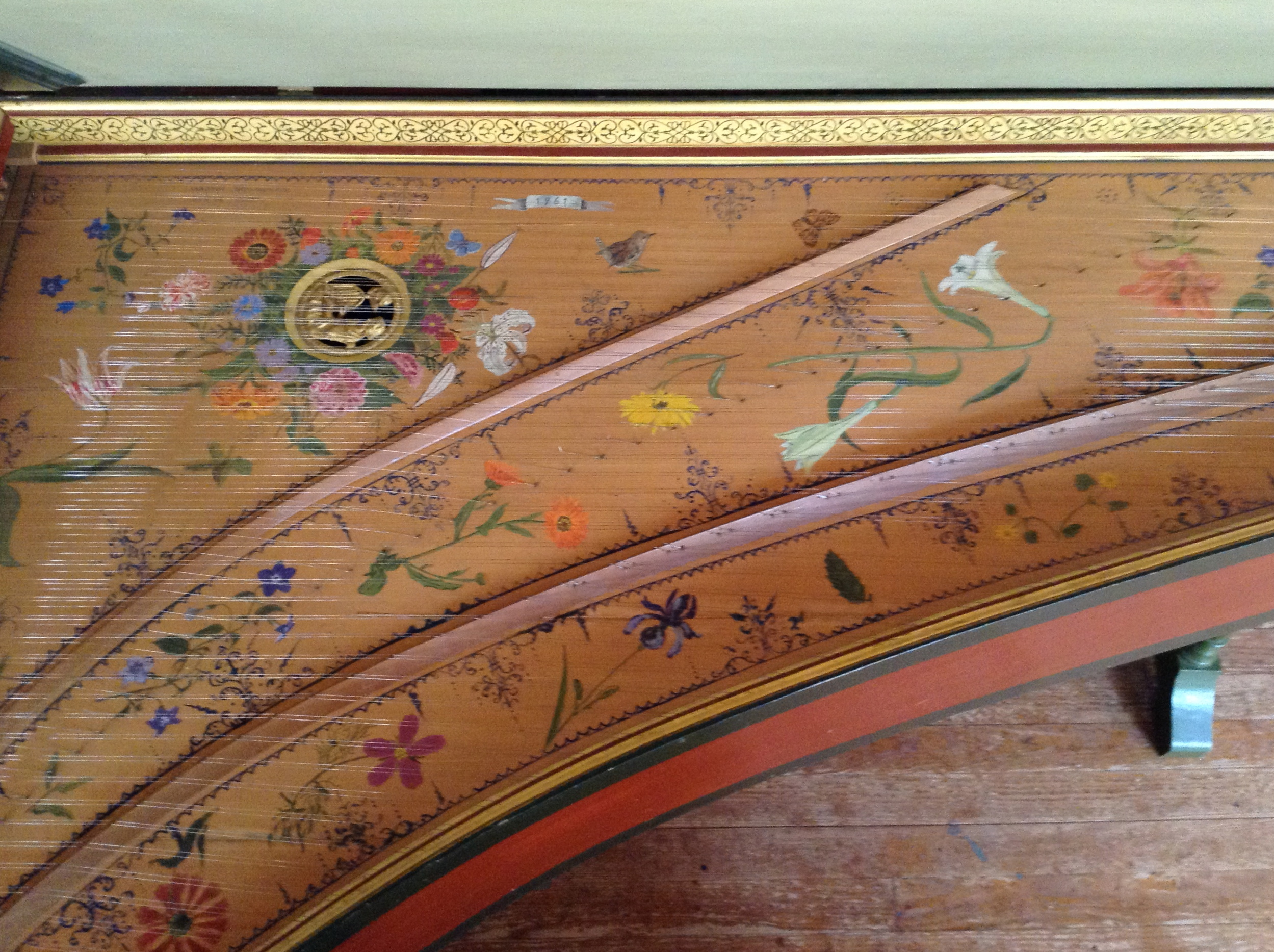
Flemish harpsichord soundboard built by Skowroneck, 1961

(Franz Hermann) Martin Skowroneck (21 December 1926, in Berlin – 14 May 2014, in Bremen) was a German harpsichord builder, one of the pioneers of the modern movement of harpsichord construction on historical principles.

== Life and career ==
He completed his secondary education in 1947, then embarked on musical training at the Musikschule in Bremen, from which he received his diploma in 1950 as a teacher of flute and recorder. During his student years, he had begun to make his own recorders, as he was dissatisfied with existing instruments. He then began making recorders for other players.

In 1952, he was asked to restore a clavichord that had been badly damaged in the war; this led him to build his own clavichord, then instruments for other people. His first harpsichord dates from 1953.

Skowroneck had no formal training as a builder; he learned his craft instead by inspecting existing instruments. At first these were modern, ahistorical instruments, but he soon developed a strong interest in the instruments of the historical period, leading him to study (among others) the harpsichords kept in the musical instrument museum of Berlin. He also studied historical documents shedding light on how the old instruments were built. Skowroneck did his pioneering studies at much the same time that in America, the builders Frank Hubbard and William Dowd were doing comparable work, but he was unaware of their studies and his accomplishment was quite independent. Harpsichord scholar Edward Kottick describes Skowroneck's work as follows:

[His instruments] were built uncompromisingly in the mode of the antiques, with practically no concessions to modernity. His cases were made of plank wood, with classical case framing; he used wood, rather than brass or plastic for his upper and lower guides, and like the antiques, his jacks had no adjustment screws; his keyboards were light and of harpsichord proportions, and he rejected the use of pedals. Skowroneck, in other words, immersed himself in the building practices of the antiques and did his best to emulate them. He succeeded brilliantly.

Skowroneck soon achieved a strong reputation, notably in becoming the builder of the favorite instrument of the celebrated harpsichordist Gustav Leonhardt.

He worked alone and always produced instruments rather slowly. Eventually, the demand for his instruments far outstripped the rate at which he could produce them. The harpsichordist Ketil Haugsand describes thus how he obtained his own Skowroneck harpsichord:

In 1970 I visited ... Skowroneck and begged him to put me on his long waiting list, which he did. I waited 17 years – and it was worth every day I waited - and finally took delivery of the harpsichord in 1986.

Skowroneck's work was not without opposition, for Germany was the center of the then-dominant industry of factory-built ahistorical harpsichords. Schotte and Elste (n.d., sec. 5) observe,

in Germany it was specially difficult for the traditional type of instrument to gain a foothold. In no other country had the modern type of harpsichord become so firmly established. Every concert hall and radio station had acquired or had ready access to a modern instrument, invariably a large two-manual harpsichord with the ‘Bach’ disposition. Conservatory teaching was based on this standard concert model. Performers and public alike had grown used to it.

Skowroneck also argued for his approach to harpsichord building in print, for instance in Skowroneck (1974), cited below. According to Kottick, "His words fell on mostly deaf ears." However, Schott (n.d.) notes at least some degree of success for Skowroneck's approach in his native country: "it is partly due to [Skowroneck's] influence and those of like-minded German harpsichord makers as Klaus Ahrend and Rainer Schütze, that German harpsichordists have turned increasingly to reproductions of historical instruments for the performance of early keyboard music."

The elderly Skowroneck was able to continue building instruments to fairly near the end of his life (a report from July 2012 indicated that he was still building). He died May 14, 2014, in Bremen, his wife Susanne (1930–2016) two years later.

== Instruments ==
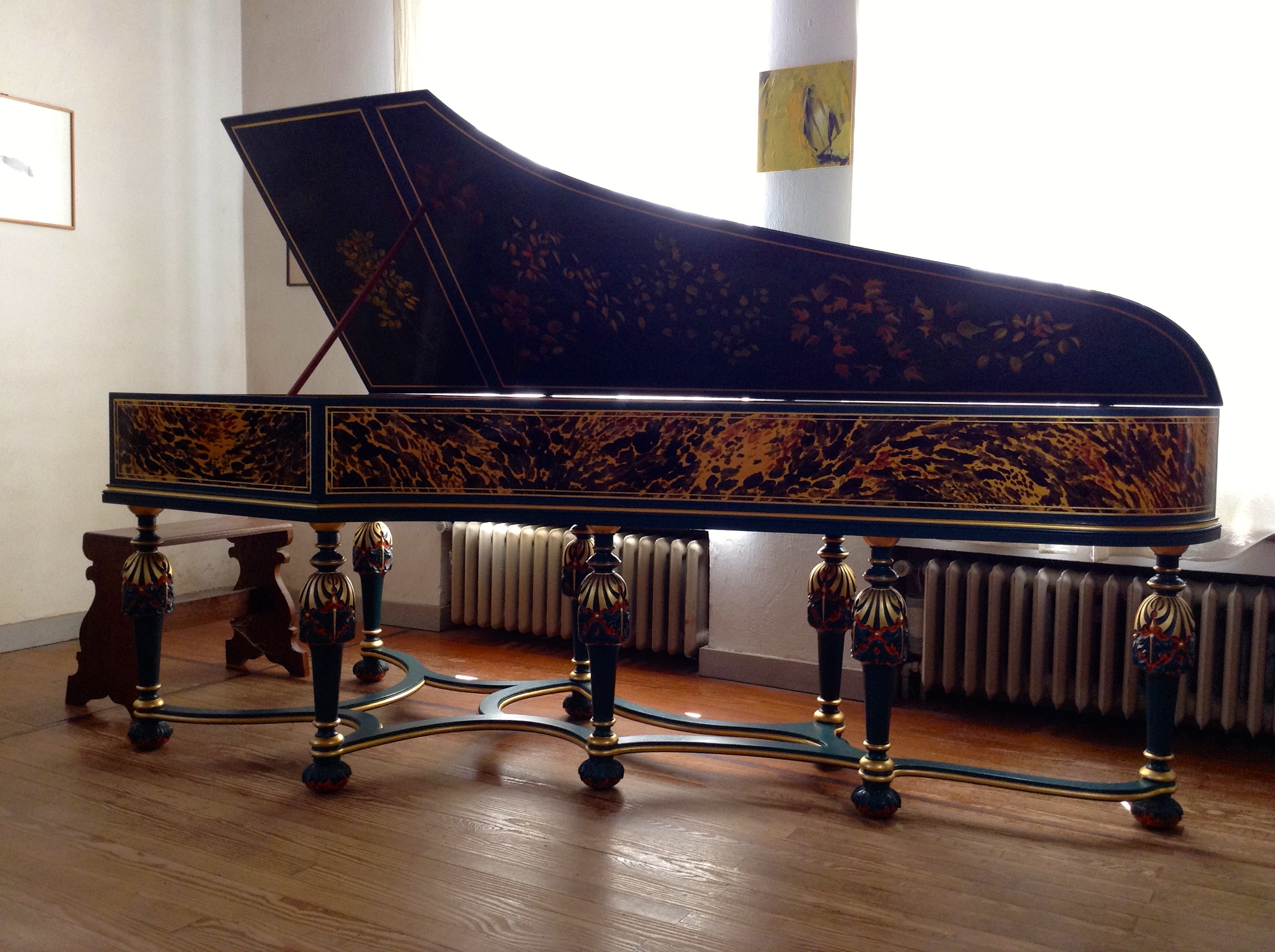
Harpsichord after Christian Zell (1728) built by Skowroneck in 1976

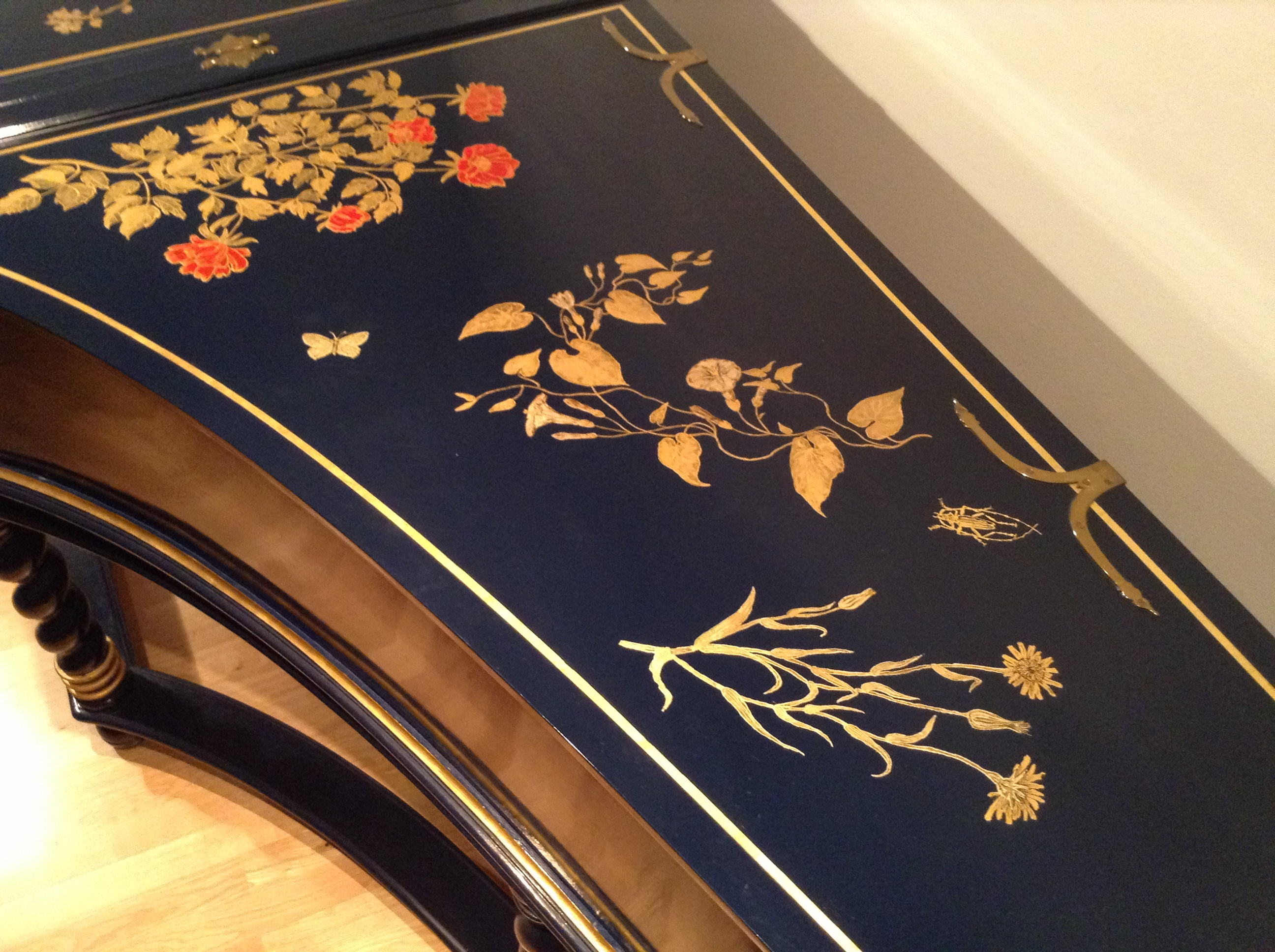
Decoration on a 1982 Skowroneck harpsichord

In spite of occasional claims to that effect, Skowroneck's instruments were re-interpretations according to historical building principles rather than scrupulously faithful reproductions of historical originals. Skowroneck described his philosophy like this: "More successful [than making a literal copy], and authentic in a higher meaning, would be a new instrument in which the maker expresses himself, fulfilling his task with all his knowledge, and supported by his judgment instead of given measurements." Skowroneck built harpsichords, clavichords, spinets and virginals after English, Italian, early (Ruckers) and late Flemish (Dulcken), 17th- and 18th-century French, and German models. Some of the materials used are considered by some as archaic, such as boar's bristles and bird feathers. Starting in 1991 he built altogether three fortepianos, and he continued to build recorders as well as transverse flutes until late in life. Skowroneck also restored old instruments to playing condition.

== Writings ==
His article 'The Harpsichord of Nicholas Lefebvre 1755' the Story of a Forgery without Intent to Defraud," (2002, translated by his son, harpsichordist/scholar Tilman Skowroneck) documented an extraordinary project, begun in response to a challenge issued by Leonhardt over a bottle of wine, to produce a fake old harpsichord that would pass muster by experts. The article documents the many ingenious procedures that went into creating the most "authentic" modern harpsichord of all; Skowroneck even "restored" his own work. As the title indicates, the author of the project confessed his deed before any possibility of legal fraud could arise.

In 2003 he published his book Cembalobau ("Harpsichord Construction"; text bilingual in German and English), a compendium of the knowledge he gained during his many years as a builder.

== See also ==
- List of historical harpsichord makers
