= Villa Cicogna Mozzoni, Bisuschio =

Coordinates: 45.8760°N 8.8704°E

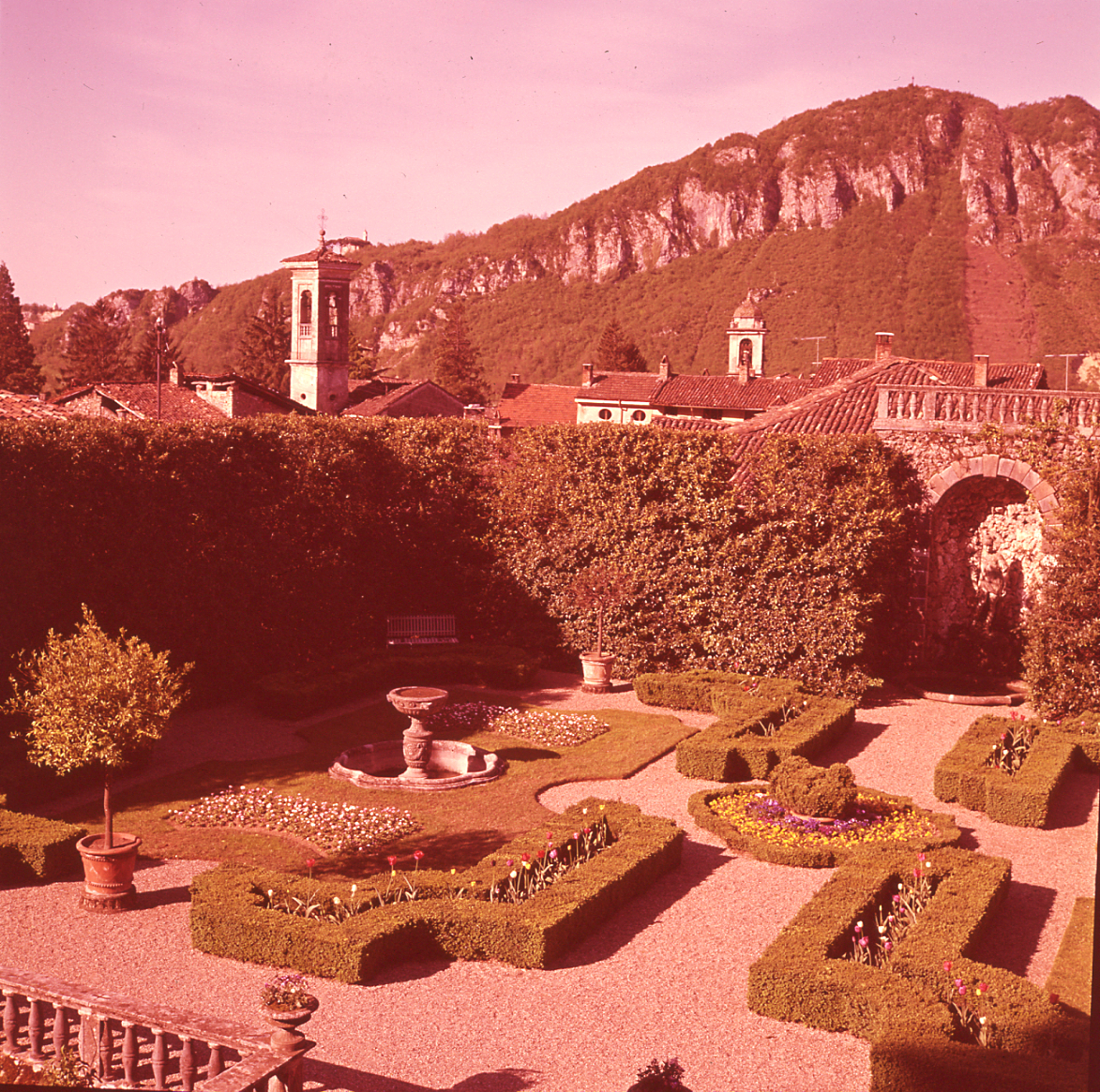
The gardens of the villa Cicogna Mozzoni. Photo by Paolo Monti.

The Villa Cicogna Mozzoni is a rural patrician residence in Bisuschio, near Varese, Province of Varese, region of Lombardy, Italy. It is an example of Lombard Renaissance architecture.

== History ==
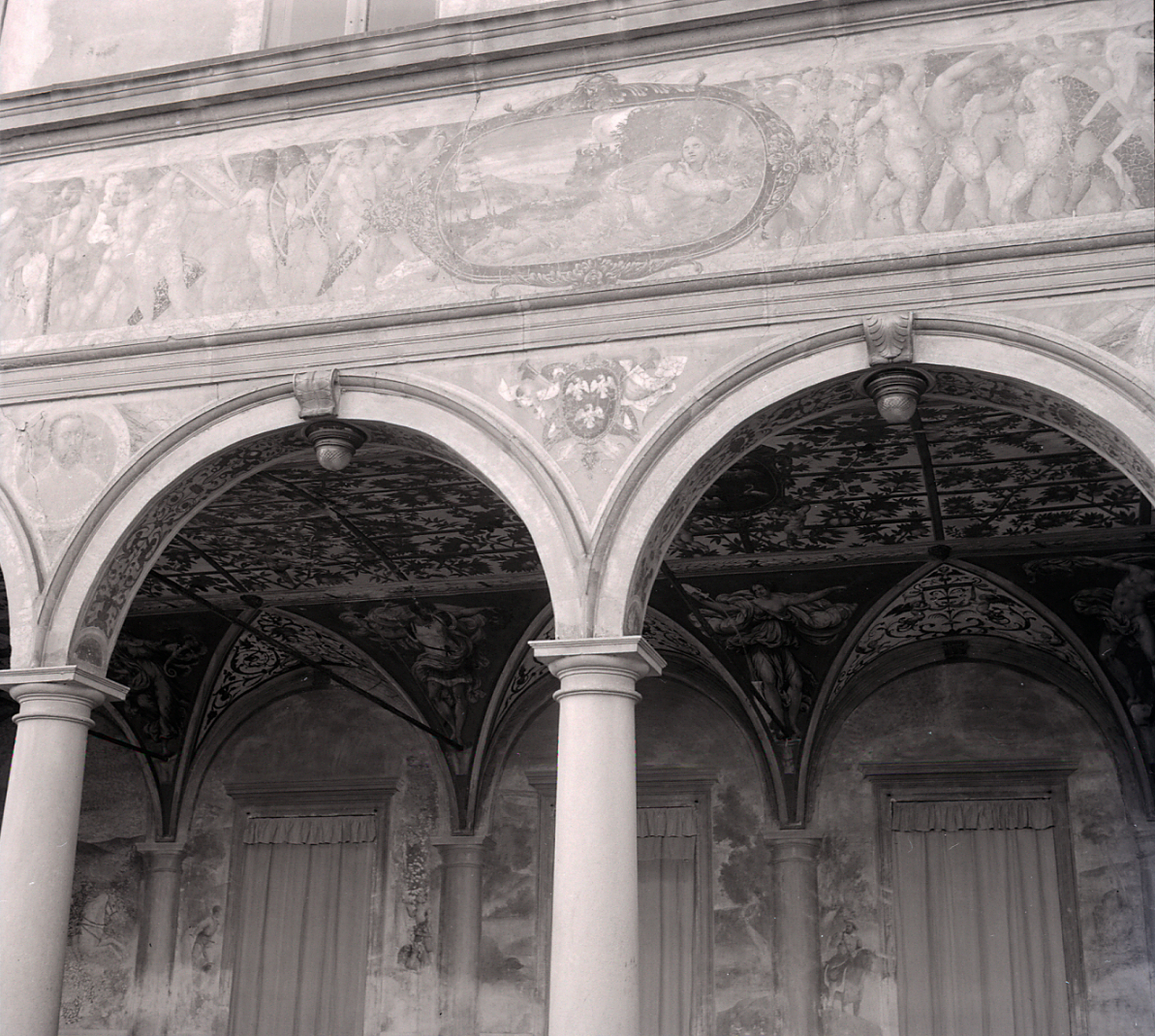
Detail of the loggia. Photo by Paolo Monti, 1975. Fondo Paolo Monti, BEIC.

The Villa was first built by the Mozzoni family in 1400 as a hunting lodge. Given its proximity to the Alps, the area teemed with wildlife. Bears were also present and an important event in the family lore is tied to an incident involving a bear attack.

The Mozzoni family was a noble Milanese family which had retired to the area around Varese (documents attest to their presence in Arcisate and Induno first, and then in Bisuschio) after factional struggles between the Della Torre and the Visconti families and their allies. After the Visconti family was replaced by the Sforza, the Mozzoni allied with this new Milanese ruling family.

In 1476, Duke Galeazzo Maria Sforza visited the Mozzoni for a hunters' outing. In that occasion, a large bear (the diary of a participant describes it as weighing 250 lbs or 114 kg) wounded three hunters and killed a dog. One of the wounded was Agostino Mozzoni. The Galeazzo Maria, grateful for the protection received against the bear, granted Agostino the exaction of taxes for the whole area of Varese, up to an established maximum.

In 1580 the only inheritor of the family name, Angela Mozzoni, married Giovan Pietro Cicogna and founded the current branch of the family which resides in Bisuschio. The family still conserves the Villa in its original configuration, including the gardens.

The gardens were commissioned by Ascanio Mozzoni in the late 16th century, who took ideas from other estates he visited in his travels. Carlo Cicogna Mozzoni expanded the garden works.

The austere Villa facade transitions to a frescoed courtyard with images of hunters on horseback and country scenes. The interior walls are extensively frescoed by artists of the school of the Campi of Cremona, breaking the rigid lines of the buildings themselves. The courtyard forms a U shape, bordering on the open side onto a terraced garden.

In the 17th-century, the family added a long stairway of water in a garden adjacent to the house. This waterway is crowned at the top by a small temple, and leads, at the bottom, to a grotto with tunnels.
