= Elwood Babbitt =

Elwood Babbitt (November 26, 1921 – April 25, 2001) was an American who claimed to be a full trance medium and psychic and was known sometimes as the "Medium of Massachusetts".

== Biography ==
Elwood Babbitt was born on November 26, 1921, in Orange, Massachusetts, to parents Roy and Alma Babbitt. He was claimed to have exhibited psychic ability even in early childhood. His family encouraged his activities, including taking him to the spiritualist community of Lake Pleasant, Massachusetts, where Elwood would assist in the readings.

Babbitt had two primary spirit guides, Dr. Fischer and Jim Cole, who helped him. Jim Cole was the "Engineer" who helped to adjust the supposed vibrational frequencies between spirit and Elwood's body. Elwood claimed that he and Dr. Fischer took turns helping each other across lives, e.g. in other lives he was in spirit assisting Dr. Fischer with his mediumship in an earth body.

== World War II ==
Babbitt served in World War II as a Marine in the Second Division. Babbitt claimed to have predicted the attack on Pearl Harbor and even told his fellow Marines the day and approximate time of the coming attack. He claimed to have witnessed the spirits as points of light as they left the bodies of the soldiers in the water. Throughout various battles in Asia, Elwood's purported abilities allowed him to lead his division safely, as he claimed to have been guided by spirits who helped him avoid danger. Other Marines in his division gave him the nickname "The Mystic". With physical death a fact of everyday life in the war, Elwood was able to comfort his fellow Marines with his knowledge.

== Charles Hapgood ==
In the late 1960s, Babbitt met Charles Hapgood. Charles Hapgood was a professor at Keene State in New Hampshire. During one of his college courses, he performed successful experiments in hypnosis, including, it was claimed, sending one of his students forward into the future by several days and reporting on his night out. Knowing that Hapgood had an interest in exploring all things scientific, one of his students suggested that he meet Elwood.

Hapgood co-authored three books with Babbitt. The first, "Voices of Spirit" is a scientific and historical approach to the world of mediumship. The second book "The God Within - A Testament of Vishnu" and third book "Talks With Christ and His Teachers" are primarily transcriptions of trance lectures claimed to have been given by the Vishnu Force, Jesus Christ, and other figures.

== The Brotherhood of Spirit (Renaissance Community) ==
In the 1970s Babbitt became the spiritual counsellor and mentor to a commune called The Brotherhood of the Spirit (renamed Renaissance Community) located in Warwick, Massachusetts.

== Caduceus School ==
Also in the 1970s, Babbitt co-founded the Caduceus School. Caduceus School allowed students the freedom to choose their curriculum. The Caduceus school helped to pave the way for the broader adoption of Home Schooling in Massachusetts.

== Illness and death ==
During World War II Babbitt was exposed to cordite poisoning which impaired his lung capacity. Later in life he developed Chronic Obstructive Pulmonary Disease. On April 25, 2001, he died from complications with lung cancer.

== Bibliography ==
- Babbitt, Elwood; Perfect Health: Accept No Substitutes, 1993, Channel One Communications
- Babbitt, Elwood; Wings of Despair, 2005, Dorrance Publishing
- Babbitt, Elwood; Wisdom From the Master Forces. Through the Psychic gift of Elwood Babbitt, 2012, Dorrance Publishing
