= Maene =

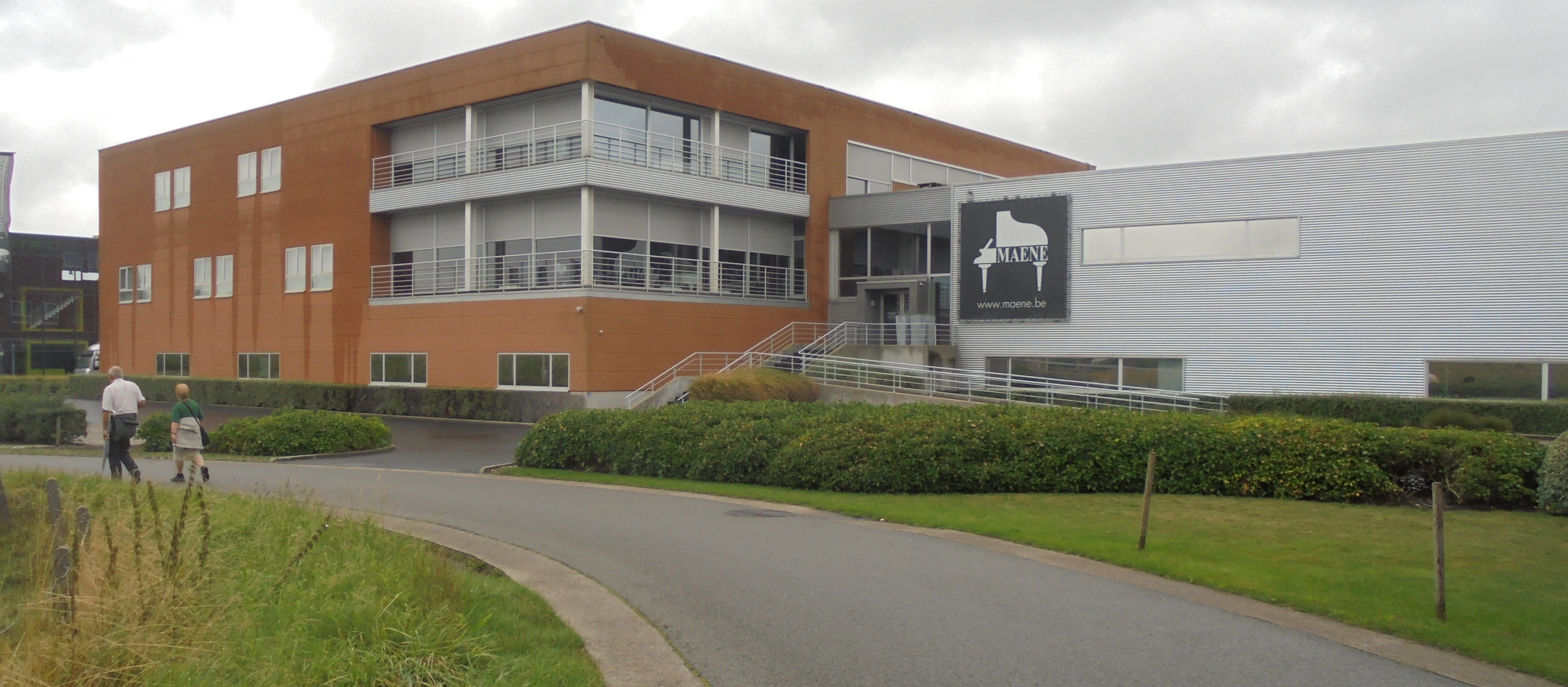

Maene is a piano and harpsichord manufacturer based in Ruiselede, Belgium.

The company was founded by Albert Maene-Doutreloigne and Zulma Doutreloigne in 1938. It is currently under the direction of their son Chris Maene.

The company produces replicas of historical instruments and develops new instruments like the Barenboim piano, which contained no crossed strings.

From 2016 to 2022, Maene collaborated with architect Rafael Viñoly on a novel piano design with a curved ergonomic keyboard that could facilitate easier access to the lowest and highest notes simultaneously.

A foot longer than a typical concert grand and like the Barenboim piano hosting no crossed strings, the Maene-Viñoly piano was completed in 2022 and premiered at the Verbier Festival played by Kirill Gerstein. In the months after Viñoly's death, the instrument was hosted at the Philadelphia Orchestra and featured at a Carnegie Hall concert in November of 2023 where it was played by Jonathan Biss.

The company also provides keyboard instruments for the Queen Elisabeth Competition.
