= Dulcken =

Flemish family of harpsichord makers

The Dulcken family were Flemish harpsichord makers of German origin.

Joannes Daniel Dulcken (21 April 1706 – 11 April 1757) was born in Wingeshausen, the son of Georg Ludwig Dulcken (died Wingeshausen, before 1752). In 1736 he was in Maastricht, but by 1738 he had moved with his wife Susanna Maria Knopffell and their son to Antwerp where they became members of the clandestine Reformed church, of which he became an elder in 1744. His workshop was located at Hopland (a street). Legend has that he travelled to England in 1750 to sell two of his harpsichords. His will left all his harpsichord-making material to his son Joannes Dulcken; he died in Antwerp. He left a good reputation behind: Charles Burney claimed that, after the Ruckers family, 'the harpsichord-maker of the greatest eminence … was J. D. Dulcken'.

He made single and double manual harpsichords, generally with a compass of five octaves (sometimes slightly less) and the common three registers; two 8' and one 4'. He decorated the soundboards with flowers and carved his initials into the rose. Dulcken's harpsichords are a development of Ruckers designs and have a larger range. His harpsichords have often served as models for modern reproductions by Martin Skowroneck and others. His surviving instruments are in collections around the world and all date from the mid-18th century.

Johan Lodewijk [Louis] Dulcken I (1733 – after 1793) was born in Maastricht and was the eldest son of Joannes Daniel Dulcken, from whom he learnt harpsichord building. He went on to establish himself in Amsterdam in 1755, and is later mentioned as an organ builder there. He was by 1783 a piano builder in Paris, frenchifying his name to Louis Dulcken. His surviving instruments are a harpsichord and a number of pianos.

Joannes Dulcken (10 September 1742 – 22 July 1775) was born in Antwerp; he was the son of Joannes Daniel Dulcken, upon whose death he moved with his mother, sister and brother-in-law to Brussels in 1764, where a workshop was set up. He too became a harpsichord maker; his surviving instruments are dated 1764 and 1769. He settled in Amsterdam in 1771 and died in The Hague.

Johan Lodewijk Dulcken II (9 August 1761 – after 1835) was born in Amsterdam and named after his father, the first Johan Lodewijk Dulcken; he was thus J.D.D.'s grandson. He went into the family business and by 1781 was employed as 'Mechanischer Hofklaviermacher' in Munich, where he remained for the rest of his life; he is last mentioned in 1835. His daughter-in-law was Sophie Dulcken.

== See also ==
- List of historical harpsichord makers

== Sources ==
- Jeannine Lambrechts-Douillez: 'Dulcken', Grove Music Online ed. L. Macy (Accessed 18 May 2007), http://www.grovemusic.com/
- A. Curtis: Dutch Harpsichord Makers, TVNM, (1960–1961)
- A.J. Gierveld: The Harpsichord and Clavichord in the Dutch Republic, TVNM, (1981)
- J. Lambrechts-Douillez: The History of Harpsichord Making in Antwerpen [sic] in the 18th Century, Studia
