= List of piano manufacturers =

This is a partial list of piano manufacturers.

A piano atlas is a book that contains detailed information about piano manufacturers, often including indexes that can match a piano's serial number to its production date.

== Active brands or companies ==
Company	Place	Country	Years active	Acquired by	Notes
Atlas	Liaoning (←Hamamatsu)	China (←Japan)	2004–present (1943–1986)		Atlas Piano and Instrument Manufacturing (Dalian) Co. Ltd is a musical instrument manufacturing company that Japan atlas piano manufacturing Co., Ltd. whole moved to China and invested and registered in Dalian Free Trade Zone.
Apollo	Hamamatsu	Japan	1948–present		Incorporated "SSS system" in their upright piano.
August Förster	Löbau	Germany	1859–present		
Baldwin	Cincinnati, OH	US	1857–present	Gibson Guitar Corporation	Acquired in 2001. Upright models are being built in Baldwin factory in Zhongshan, China. Grand pianos are being built to Baldwin specifications by Parsons Music Group, Hong Kong.
Bechstein	Berlin	Germany	1853–present		Also manufactures W. Hoffmann and Zimmerman brands. It has its own line of artists.
Becker	Moscow	Russia	1841–present		Nationalized in 1918 and renamed into the 'Red October' brand. Production stopped during Perestroika and relaunched later under the Becker name.
Beiijing HsingHai	Beijing	China	1949–present		Also manufactures the Hardman brand.
Belarus	Minsk	Belarus	1935–present		Only upright pianos of its own brand.
Blüthner	Leipzig	Germany	1853–present		Also manufactures Haessler and Irmler brands. In addition, it has its own line of artists.
Borgato	Bagnolo di Lonigo, Vicenza	Italy	1991–present		
Bösendorfer	Vienna	Austria	1828–present	Yamaha	Acquired in 2007. It also has its own line of artists.
John Broadwood & Sons	London	UK	1728–present		Antique upright and grand pianos.
Cavendish	Bolton Abbey	UK	2012–present		
Edelweiss	Cambridge	UK	1975–present		All upright and grand piano come by default as player pianos.
ENSCHU	Hamamatsu	Japan	2019–present		ENSCHU is known for producing pianos and has gained recognition across Japan, especially for its involvement in the popular Street Piano movement.
Estonia	Tallinn	Estonia	1950–present		
Fazioli	Sacile	Italy	1978–present		Has its own line of artists.
Ferd. Thürmer	Bochum	Germany	1834–present		
Feurich	Leipzig	Germany	1851–present		Acquired in 2011. The bulk of manufacturing is carried out in Hailun Piano Company factory in Ningbo, China except the upright piano 123 – Vienna made in Vienna, Austria. In 2011, after the acquisition of the German piano manufacturing company Feurich, all Wendl & Lung piano models were renamed Feurich. In 2021 Feurich - Wendl&Lung GmbH was renamed Feurich Pianoforte GmbH. It also has its own line of pianists.
Fritz Dobbert	Osasco	Brazil	1950–present		As of 2012, the only piano factory in Latin America.
Hailun	Ningbo	China	2002–present		Also manufactures ''Cline'', ''Cunningham'' and ''Emerson'' brands and manufactures pianos for other piano companies.
JF Hessen SHIZUOKA JAPAN	Fukuroi	Japan	2004–present		
Kawai	Hamamatsu	Japan	1927–present		Also manufactures Shigeru Kawai grand pianos. Also has its own line of artists.
Maene	Ruiselede	Belgium	1938–present		
Mason & Hamlin	Boston	US	1854–present	Burgett, Inc.	Has changed hands and factories many times in its history. See main article. Also has its own line of artists.
Parsons	Hong Kong	China	1986–present		Also manufactures Yangtze River, Schönbrunn, Barrate & Robinson, and Brodmann brands.
Pearl River	Guangzhou	China	1956–present		Also manufactures Fandrich, Kayserburg and Ritmüller brands.
Petrof	Hradec Králové	Czech Republic	1864–present		Also manufactures the Ant. Petrof, Ant. Dalibor, Weinbach, Rösler, Scholze, Fibich and Akord brands.
Pfeiffer	Stuttgart	Germany	1862–present		
Ravenscroft	Scottsdale, AZ	US	2004–present		
Rönisch	Dresden	Germany	1897–present	Blüthner	Acquired in 2009.
Samick	Incheon	South Korea	1958–present		Also manufactures the Kohler & Campbell, Pramberger and Wm. Knabe brands.
Sauter	Spaichingen	Germany	1819–present		
Schimmel	Braunschweig	Germany	1885–present	Pearl River Piano Group	Acquired in 2016. Also manufactures the Wilhelm Schimmel and Fridolin Schimmel brands.
Schirmer & Son	Lehnin	Germany	1855–present	T & B Piano GmbH	
Gebr. Schulz	Wiesbaden	Germany	1888–present		
Seiler	Kitzingen	Germany	1849–present	Samick	Acquired in 2008. Also manufactures Eduard Seiler and Johannes Seiler brands.
Steingraeber & Söhne	Bayreuth	Germany	1852–present		Has its own line of artists.
Steinway & Sons	New York / Hamburg	US / Germany	1853–present		Also sells the Boston and Essex brands. It has its own line of artists.
Stuart & Sons	Newcastle	Australia	1990–present		
Walter	Elkhart	US	1969–present		Manufactures Charles R. Walter brand.
Wilh. Steinberg	Eisenberg	Germany	1877–present	Parsons Music Group	Acquired in 2013. Has its own line of artists.
WISTARIA	Yamato	Japan	1924–present		
Yamaha	Hamamatsu	Japan	1900–present		Piano production started at 1900. Has its own line of artists.
Young Chang	Seoul	South Korea	1956–present	Hyundai Development Company	Acquired in 2006. Also Manufactures the Weber and Albert Weber brands.
Zanta	Caldogno, Vicenza	Italy	1979–present		

== Defunct brands or companies ==
Company	Place	Country	Years active	Acquired by	Notes
A. B. Chase	Ohio	US	1875–1985	Aeolian Company	
A. M. McPhail	Boston	US	1837–1960		
A. Mittag	Berlin	Germany	1800		
Adam Schaaf	Chicago	US	1873–1930		Also sold as Clarion and Orpheus.
Aeolian Company	New York City	US	1868–1985		Merged with Ampico in 1932. Ampico rebranded as Aeolian in 1941.
Albert Fahr	Zeitz	Germany	1887–1950		
Albert W. Ladd	Boston	US	1848–1930		
Alexander Herrmann KG	Sangerhausen	Germany	1803–1993		
Alfred Knight, Ltd.	London	UK	1936–2003		
Allen Brook	London	UK			
Alpheus Babcock	Boston	US	1810–1829		
American Piano Company	East Rochester, NY	US	1908–1941	Aeolian Company	aka Ampico
Astin Weight	Salt Lake City	US	1959–1999		
August Heide	Germany?	Australia	c. 1896–1954		Pianos with August Heide branded were originally offered solely by Glen's Music Store (also known as W H. Glen and Co.) of Collins Street Melbourne, and George Street, Sydney. The name later became associated with the Maples chain of stores. The brand is presumed to have taken its name after a man that died during a tragic industrial accident in 1893, which was reported in newspapers across parts of Australia. These pianos were built to be sold as budget, lower-end models and were manufactured by an unknown company, likely imported from Germany.
Baumgardt Piano	Stockholm	Sweden	1859		
Baus Piano Company	New York City	US	1895–1929	Jacob Doll Piano Company	Factories located at Southern Blvd. and Trinity Ave. They built a full line of upright pianos, player pianos, and grand pianos. It was acquired circa 1910; went out of business in the Great Depression.
Beale Piano	Sydney	Australia	1893–1975		
Becker Brothers	New York	US	1892–1940		They Also built pianos under the Bennington name, and player pianos under the Mellotone and Playernola name as well.
Behr Brothers & Co.	New York	US	1880–1950	Kohler & Campbell	Founded by Henry Behr
Bell Brothers	Muncie, IN	US	1915–1930		
Berlin Piano and Organ Company	Berlin, Ontario	Canada	1890–1924		
Bogs & Voigt	Berlin	Germany	1905–1939		
Boisselot & Fils	Marseille	France	1831–1908		The brand became Boisselot Fils & Co. in 1847, after the passing of his father Jean-Louis Boisselot.
Brinkerhoff Piano Company	Chicago	US	1906–1950		
Brinsmead	London	UK	1835–1921		
Brødrene Hals	Oslo	Norway	1847–1925		
Bush & Gerts	Chicago	US	1884–1942		Bought by Haddorff Piano co. in 1942.
Cable and Sons	New York	US	1852–1936		
Cable Piano Company	Chicago	US	1880–1937		Merged with Schiller Piano Company to become The Schiller Cable Manufacturing Company.
Cable-Nelson Piano Company	Chicago	US		Founded by brother of Cable Piano Co	Sold under the names Fayette S. Cable, Radcliffe, Lakeside, Sweetland, Henderson and Boller.
Camp & Company	New York City	US	1879–1930	Kohler & Campbell	
Carl Dörr	Vienna	Austria	1817–1920		
Carl Ecke	Posen	Germany	1843–1930		
Challen Pianos	London	UK	1804–1980		
Chappell & Co.	London	UK	1811–1980	Kemble	
Charles Albrecht	Philadelphia / Long Island	US	1789–1887	Schultz & Sons Manufacturing Corp.	One of the earliest pianos made in America. The first known piano by Albrecht is located at the Historical Society of Pennsylvania.
Charles Stieff	Baltimore	US	1856–1951		Often referred to as "The poor man's Steinway".
Chas. S. Norris	Boston	US	1930		
Chickering and Sons	Boston	US	1823–1983	American Piano Company	Acquired in 1908.
Christian Baumann	Zweibrücken	Germany	1740–1816		
Chute & Butler	Peru, IN	US	1900–c. 1920	Schiller Piano Company	Acquired around 1920. The brand name remained in use until 1923.
Clementi & Company	London	UK	1767–1929		
Collard & Collard	London	UK	1767–1929		
Cunningham Piano Company	Philadelphia	US	1891		Pianos are made in China by Hailun Pianos.
Currier Piano Co.	Boston and Marion, NC	US	1823–1969		
Danemann Pianos	London	UK	1893–1994		Also made a Waldberg brand however 'Waldberg Berlin' may be a different company.
Davenport & Treacy	New York	US	1868-?		
Decker Brothers	New York	US	1862–1900		
Ehrbar	Vienna	Austria-Hungary			
Ellington Piano	Cincinnati	US	1893–1930		
Emerson Piano Company	Boston	US	1849–1945		
Érard	Paris	France	1777–1971		
Ernst Kaps	Dresden	Germany	1858–1930		
Estey Piano Company	New York	US	1846–1961		
Euterpe Piano	New York	US	1820–1930		
Falcone	Haverhill, MA	US	1982–1993	America Sejung Corp.	
Francis Connor	New York	US	1871–1933		
G. Rösler	Česká Lípa	Bohemia	1878–1948	Petrof	Acquired in 1993.
G. Schwechten	Berlin	Germany	1854–1902		The name "Schwechten" is used in China by Shanghai Piano Co.
Gabler	New York	US	1851–1866		
Gaveau	Paris	France	1847–1994		
Gebr. Perzina	Schwerin	Germany	1871–1989		The Perzina name was revived as "Yantai Perzina" in China.
George Steck	New York	US	1857–1985	America Sejung Corp.	
George Wilkinson	London	UK	1811–1835		
Gerhard Heintzman Co.	Toronto	Canada	1890-1926	Heintzman & Co.	
Grotrian-Steinweg	Braunschweig	Germany	1835–2025	Parsons Music Group	Acquired in 2015. A majority interest in Grotrian-Steinweg was purchased by Parsons Music Group. Also manufactures the Wilhelm Grotrian brand. Also has its own line of pianists. In January 2025, Parsons Music Group closed the Grotrian-Steinweg piano factory. Its not know if they will continue using the name in Parsons pianos.
Grinnell	Detroit, MI	US	1902–1960		In the 1990s, the Grinnell name was revived in a limited number of pianos built by Samick.
Gulbransen	Chicago	US	1904–1969		
Haddorf Piano Company	Rockford, IL	US	1902–1960		Maker of Steinbach, Clarendon & Dreher, Bush & Gerts
Haines Brothers	New York	US	1851–1945		
Hallet, Davis & Co.	Boston	US	1835–1985	North American Music, Inc.	The brand are made in China by Beijing Hsinghai Piano Group, Silbermann Piano Co., and Parsons Music for the importer, North American Music Inc.
Hazelton Brothers	New York City	US	1850-1957	Kohler & Campbell	Kohler & Campbell continued to use the Hazelton Brothers name for some of its products until it was sold to Samick in 1985. Samick continues to use the Hazelton Brothers name for some of its exports.
Hardman Peck	New York	US	1842–1990		The name "Hardman" is used in China by Beiijing HsingHai.
Haynes	Chicago	US			
Heintzman & Co.	Toronto	Canada	1866–1929		
Hobart M. Cable	La Porte, IN	US	1900–1960		Ceased operations in the 1960s; brand was acquired by Story & Clark, then American Sejung.
Hornung & Møller	Copenhagen	Denmark	1827–1972		
Hupfield	Dresden	Germany	1880–1990		
J. & C. Fischer	New York	US	1840–1985		
J. B. Cramer & Co.	London	UK	1824–1964		
Jesse French Piano & Organ Company	Tennessee and Indiana	US	1885 - 1902		Jesse French first built pianos from 1875 - 1885 for the Dorman, French & Smith company. In 1902 firm became Krell-French when Albert Krell joined. In 1905, Krell left and the firm was renamed "Jesse French & Sons." In 1955, The P. A. Stark Piano Company bought the firm.
J. G. Irmler	Leipzig	Germany	1818–1950	Blüthner	
J. Gunther	Brussels	Belgium	1845–1960		
J. Strauss & Son	Chicago	US	1925		
J. W. Jenkins	St. Louis, MO	US	1910–1964		
Johann Heichele	Ljubljana, Trieste	Italy	1790–1813		
Julius Bauer & Co.	Chicago	US	1857–1930		
Kemble & Co.	London	UK	1911–2009	Yamaha	
Kieselhorst Piano Company	St. Louis, MO	US	1879-1930		Established piano dealer that began selling pianos under its own name around 1895; unclear whether they were stencils.
King Piano Co.	Sheboygan, WI	US	1901–1930		Purchased by H.C. Bay in 1912.
Kirschner	New York	US			
H. Kohl	Hamburg	Germany	1855–1909		
Kohler & Campbell	New York	US	1894–1985	Samick	Acquired the name.
Krakauer Brothers	New York	US	1869–1980		
Kranich & Bach	New York	US	1864–1985		
Kurtzmann	New York	US	1848–1938		
Lakeside Piano Company	Chicago, IL	US		Cable-Nelson	
Lauter Piano Co.	Newark, NJ	US	1862–1930		
Lesage Piano Company	Quebec	Canada	1884–1911	Willis & Co.	Acquired in 1907.
Lester Piano Company	Lester, PA	US	1888–1961		Also manufactured brands Channing, Alden, Bellaire, Schubert and Leonard.
Loud Brothers	Philadelphia	US	1822–1837		
Lindeman & Sons	New York	US	1836–2003		
Ludwig & Co.	St. Louis, MO	US	1889–1933		
Marshall & Wendell	New York	US	1875–1953		
Mason & Risch	Ontario	Canada	1871–1972		
Mathushek Piano Co.	New York	US	1852–1879		
Mehlin & Sons	New York	US	1853–1960		
Melville Clark	DeKalb, IL	US	1900–1940	Baldwin Piano Company	Purchased by Baldwin in 1919.
Mendelssohn	Toronto	Canada	1870–1960		
Monington & Weston	London	UK	1858–1975		
Moore and Moore	London	UK	1900–1920		
Muir, Wood and Company	Edinburgh	Scotland	1798–1818	Wood, Small and Company	Wood, Small and Company was formed at John Muir's Death in 1818.
Murdoch, McKillop & Co	Edinburgh	Scotland	1903		
Narvesen	New York City	US	1863-1902		Founded by Norwegian piano builder Conrad Narvesen. Originally called Ihlseng, Narvesen, & Linstedt in 1863. In 1864 it became Ihlseng & Narvesen, and in 1869 it became Narvesen & Son. In 1885 it became the Narvesen Piano Company. It was briefly known as Narvesen, Hangaard & Bergmann prior to being purchased by Richard M. Walters in 1890. Walters continued to operate to company using the Narvesen name until his death in 1902.
Newman Brothers	Chicago	US	1880–1930		
Nordheimer	Toronto	Canada	1844–1960		
Normandie	East Rochester, NY	USA			
P. A. Starck Piano	Chicago	US	1891–1965		
Pape	Paris	France	1817–1875		
Peek & Son	New York City	United States	1850-193?		
Petzold	Paris	France	1806		
Pirsson	New York	US	1822–1855		
Pleyel et Cie	Paris	France	1807–2013		At the end of 2013, the company announced it would cease manufacturing pianos in France.
R. Lipp & Sohn	Stuttgart	Germany	1831–1998		
R. Görs & Kallmann	Berlin	Germany	1877–1990		
R. S. Williams & Sons	Toronto	Canada	1856–1931		Manufactured mandolins, banjos, melodeons, organs and pianos.
Raudenbush & Sons	St. Paul, MN	US	1883–1935		
Reed & Sons	Chicago	US	1842–1920		
Robert Wornum & Sons	London	UK	1811–1900		
Rud. Ibach Sohn	Düsseldorf	Germany	1794–2007		
Schiedmayer	Stuttgart	Germany	1809–2008		Piano production stopped in 1980.
Schiller Piano Company	Oregon, IL	US	1890–1936	Cable Company; Winter and Company	Pianos continued being manufactured under the Schiller name until 1957.
M. Schulz Piano Co.	Chicago	US	1869–1930		Company manufactured and sold pianos under the names of M. Schulz, Walworth, Bradford, Irving, and Maynard, and Aria Divina. They were also sold under the names Brinkerhoff (from teens until about 1950s) and Schriver & Sons.
Schweighofer	Vienna	Austria	1792–1938		
Sears, Roebuck & Company	Chicago	US	1900–1930		Also manufactured and sold brands Beckwith, American Home, Maywood, Beverley, and Caldwell.
Sezemsky	Chicago	US	1886–1901		
Sherman, Clay & Co.	San Francisco	US	1853–2013		
Shondorff	Woodbridge, CT	US	1850–1938	National Piano Manufacturing Company	
Shoninger & Son	New York	US	1850–1965		
Simpson & Son Piano Co.	Albuquerque, NM	US	1940–1990		Simpson & Son was the only piano manufacturer west of the Mississippi during that time. They specialized in custom spinet upright pianos.
F. G. Smith	New York	US	1866		
Sohmer & Co.	New York	US	1872–1996		
Søren Jensen	Copenhagen	Denmark	1893–1921	sponagle	
Starr Piano Company	Richmond, IN	US	1872–1950		Originally named the Trayser Piano Company, after one of its founders, George Trayser. They also produced a more affordable, yet exceptional quality, piano line, the "Richmond Piano Company", which was sold alongside theirs in showrooms. Also known for founding Gennett Records.
Steger & Sons	Chicago	US	1879–1959		"Steger & Sons is one of the few American manufacturers to survive the Great Depression without being absorbed into a larger conglomerate. "
Steinbach & Dreher	Rockford, IL	US	1902–1960		Actually made by Haddorff Piano company.
Sterling Piano Company	Derby, CT	US	1866–1967		Founded in 1845 as The Sterling Organ Company by Charles A. Sterling, the company merged with the Winter Piano Company after the Great Depression. They also produced the cheaper, but reputable, Huntington Piano.
Story & Clark	Chicago	US	1884–1993		
Straube Piano Company	Downers Grove, IL, US (1895–1904); Hammond, IN, US (1904–1940); Chicago Heights, IL, US (1940–1942); Rockford, IL	US	1895–1949	C.G. Conn	Manufactured Straube, Hammond, Gilmore, and Woodward; receiver's sale in 1934; bankruptcy in 1937 – remaining assets, including name and patents continued in 1937 in the newly formed Indiana corporation, Straube Pianos Inc.
Strich & Zeidler	New York City	US	1889–1930		Also manufactured Homer brand.
Stuyvesant Piano Company	New York	US	1886-1892	Merged in the Weber Piano Company in 1892 when Weber was acquired by Wheelock. Later acquired by the Aeolian Company in 1903.	Founded by William E. Wheelock.
Sweetland Piano Company	Chicago, IL	US		Cable-Nelson	
Th. Mann & Co.	Bielefeld	Germany	1836–1942		
Thomas Goggan & Brother	Galveston, TX	US	1866–1915		
Timothy Gilbert	Boston	US	1829–1868		
Uebel & Lechleiter	Heilbronn	Germany	1872–1987		
United Piano Makers	New York	US	1860–1880		
Vose & Sons	Boston	US	1851–1985	Aeolian Company	Founded by James Whiting Vose
W. Ritmüller & Sohn	Göttingen	Germany	1795–1933		Pearl River Piano Group in China uses the brand name "Ritmüller" for their pianos.
W. W. Kimball and Company	Chicago	US	1857–1996	Kimball International	
Weber Piano Company	New York	US	1852–1985	Young Chang	Young Chang acquired the Weber name in 1985.
Weber (Ontario)	Kingston, ON	Canada	1865–1961	Lesage Piano Company	
Welmar Pianos	London	UK	1925–2003		
Wendl & Lung	Vienna	Austria	1910–2021		Wendl & Lung piano models were renamed Feurich. The company was renamed Feurich Pianoforte GmbH in 2021.
Wertheim Piano	Melbourne	Australia	1908–1935		
Ed. Westermayer	Berlin	Germany	1863–1941		
Whaley-Royce	Toronto	Canada	1888–1969		
Wilhelm Spaethe	Gera	Germany	1858–1920		
Willis & Co.	Montreal	Canada	1889–1979		Acquired Lesage Piano Company in 1907. Also manufactured Newcombe
Winter & Co.	New York City	US	1899–1959	Aeolian American	Founded in 1899 as Heller & Co.; purchased by Julius Winter and renamed in 1901. Merged with Aeolian American in 1959 to form Aeolian Company.
Wm. Knabe & Co.	Baltimore	US	1837–1982	Samick	Acquired the name in 2001.
Wolfframm	Dresden	Germany	1872–1930		Started out under Apollo brand name.
Wood, Small and Company	Edinburgh	Scotland	1818–1829		Successive firms were Wood and Company, J. Muir Wood Company, and Small, Bruce and Company. Continued until Andrew Wood's Death in 1829
Wurlitzer	Cincinnati, OH	US	1856–1988	Baldwin Piano Company	Also sold under the names Apollo, De Kalb, Julius Bauer, Farney, Kingston, Kurtzman, Merrium. Schaff Bros. and Underwood.
Zimmermann	Seifhennersdorf	Germany	1884–2011	C. Bechstein	Acquired in 1992.

== See also ==
- List of piano brand names
- Liste von Klavierbauern (List of German Piano Manufacturers)
- Frederick Beck (piano maker)
