= M161 =

M161 or M-161 may refer to:

- Maserati Levante, a car also known as Tipo M161
- M161 (Cape Town), a road in Cape Town, South Africa
- Sisu M-161, a Finnish lorry
- M-161, a piano model by Schirmer & Son
- M-161, the identifier of the 1966 romance novel Nurse at Moorcroft Manor written by Sharon Heath and published by Ace Books
