= Steingraeber & Söhne =

Steingraeber
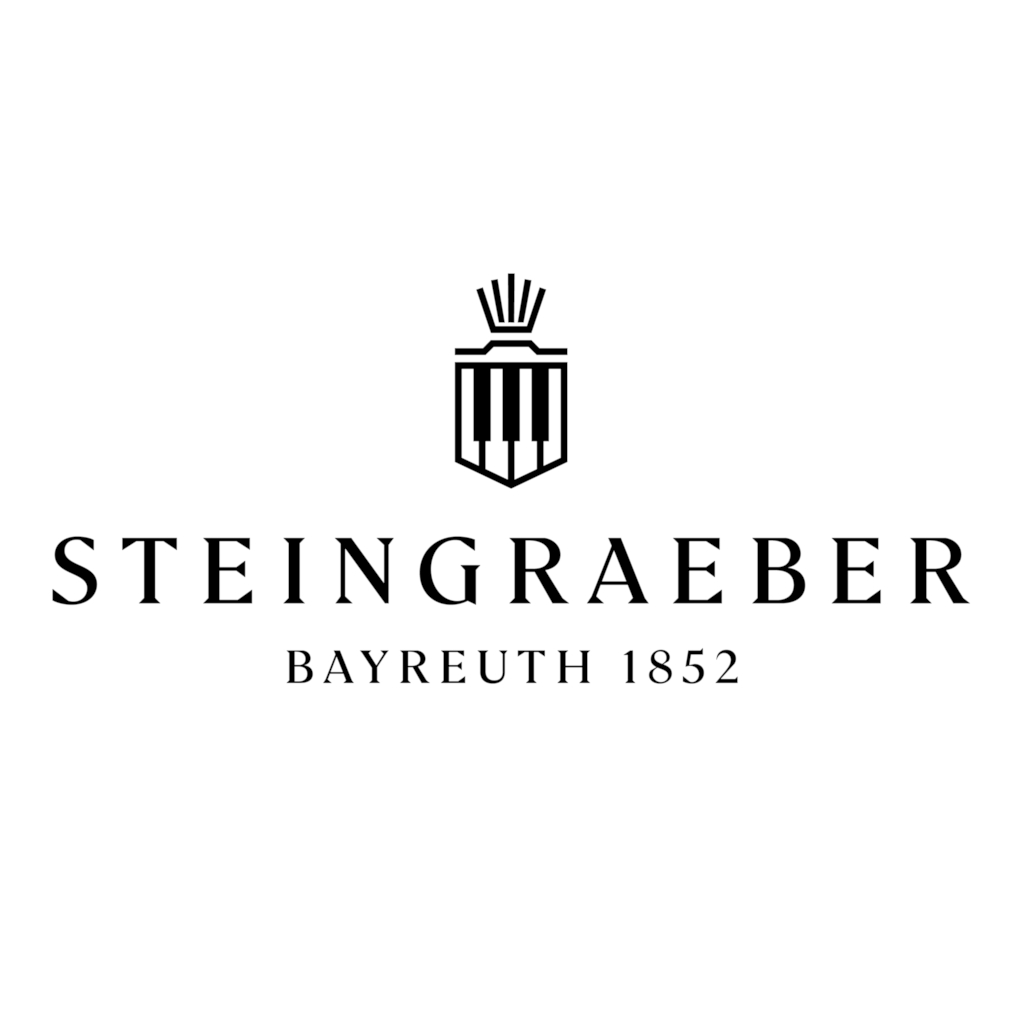
- Company type: Private
- Industry: Musical instruments
- Founded: August 17, 1852 (173 years ago) in Bayreuth, Germany
- Founder: Eduard Steingraeber
- Area served: Worldwide
- Key people: Fanny Steingraeber (general manager) Alban Steingraeber (general manager)
- Products: Grand pianos, Upright pianos
- Website: www.steingraeber.de

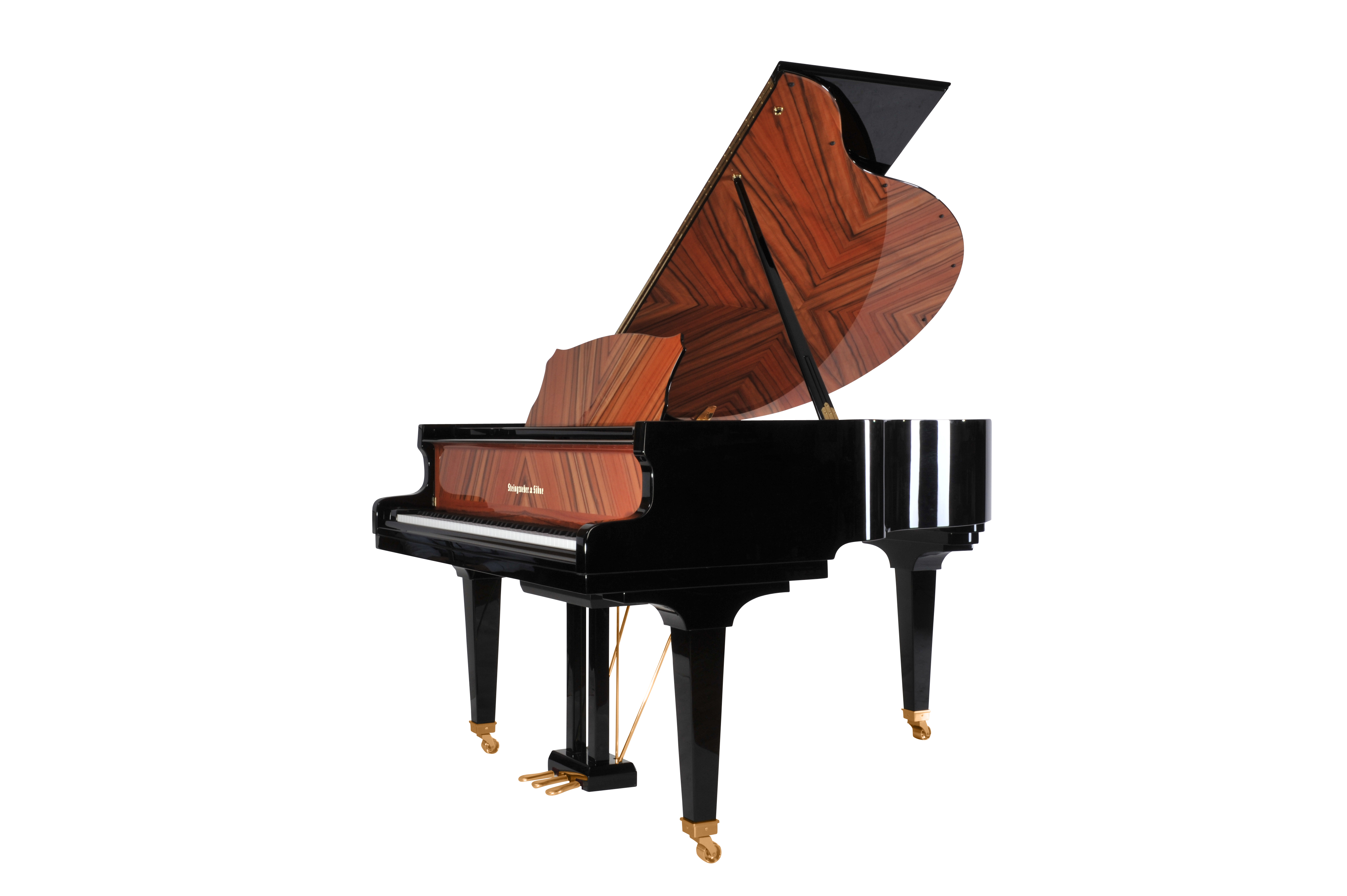
Salon grand piano A 170 in tineo veneer (2018)

The Steingraeber Piano Manufactory (until 2022 Steingraeber & Söhne) is a major German manufacturer of grand and upright pianos. The family business was founded 1852 in Bayreuth, where the instruments are still manufactured today. It has its headquarters in Steingraeber Haus, a historic Rococo palace. Fanny and Alban Steingraeber run the company in the seventh generation.

== History ==
The forerunner of the company was a family of harpsichord makers in Thuringia, who later settled as instrument makers in Neustadt an der Orla. In 1820, the first piano and organ workshop was founded there by Johann Gottlieb Steingraeber. His nephew, Eduard Steingraeber, born in 1823, was apprenticed to him and during his years of wandering worked in Vienna, among other places, in the business of the piano maker Nannette Streicher, daughter of the well-known piano maker Johann Andreas Stein from Augsburg. Eduard Steingraeber accompanied the composer and piano virtuoso Franz Liszt on his concert tours as his piano tuner, which the latter regularly demolished during his concerts.

In 1852, Eduard Steingraeber founded the Steingraeber Pianoforte Fabrik in Bayreuth, where he produced his revolutionary first grand piano. In 1871, Steingraeber purchased the Liebhardtsche Palais and made it the company's headquarters. It is one of the few surviving rococo buildings in the city. Since then it has borne the name Steingraeber-Haus. The company quickly developed into the largest Bavarian piano factory.

Since the beginning of the Bayreuth Festival in 1876, Steingraeber has been a supplier for the festival and the Wagner family.

In 1881 Richard Wagner commissioned the company to build the so-called Grail Bell Piano, which is used in the temple scenes of Parsifal. In 1898, the new production facility in Dammallee was opened next to the Steingraeber Haus.The instruments are still manufactured there today.

In addition to Richard Wagner and Franz Liszt, famous guests of the house included Engelbert Humperdinck, Richard Strauss and Alfred Cortot. Liszt himself played music in the rococo hall of the house, which has been preserved in its original state to this day. This grand piano, the “Liszt Flügel”, is still used for concerts.

In 1907, Lilly Steingraeber became the first woman to head the company. In the first years after World War II, the company produced furniture and radio cases, employing 38 people and running at 40% capacity. The continuous production of grand pianos was interrupted from 1940 onwards and was resumed in 1972 under the management of Heinrich and Magdalene Schmidt.

Udo Schmidt-Steingraeber took over the company in 1980 following the death of his father. In the course of his management, extensive innovations and renewals of the brand took place. The Steingraeber Haus underwent structural changes and now houses several concert and selection halls, as well as artists' apartments, which are available to guests of the house. In addition, exhibits from the history of the brand are displayed in the instrument museum and an insight into the work of the piano makers is provided. On display are Eduard Steingraeber's Opus 1, as well as preserved original radio cases from the post-war period.

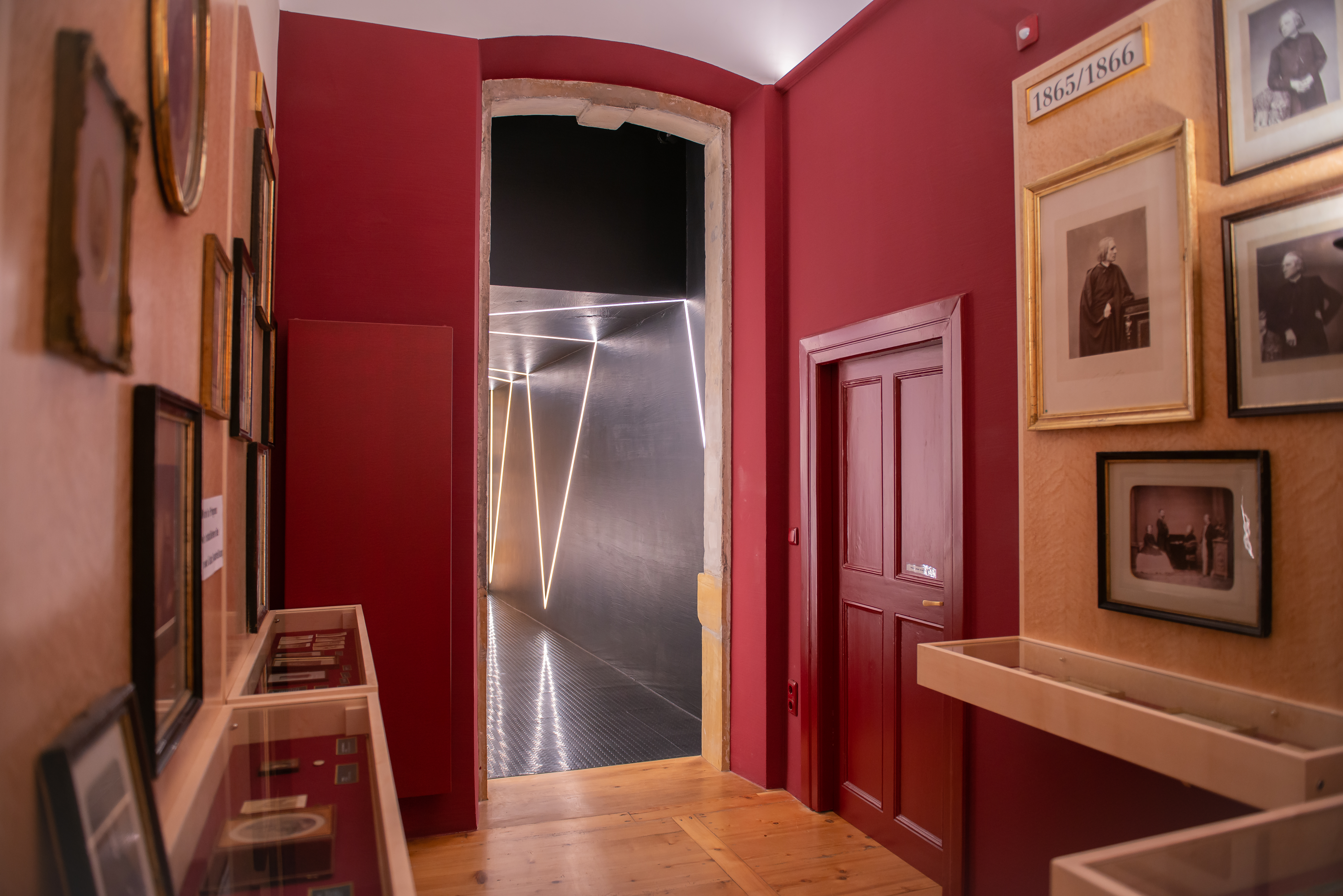
Liszt exhibition with the sound bridge in the background

There is an extensive concert schedule with over one hundred events a year. Since 1988, this has included the Zeit für neue Musik (Time for New Music) festival, which was created in collaboration with the composer and pianist Helmut Bieler. The Steingraber Haus is a venue for the Franz Liszt Piano Competition Weimar-Bayreuth. As part of the Bayreuth Piano Festival initiated and hosted by Steingraeber, renowned artists such as Fazil Say, Edith Fischer, Martha Argerich, Alfred Brendel, Cyprien Katsaris, Daniil Olegovich Trifonov, and Elisabeth Leonskaja have performed at events in the Margravial Opera House, the Stadthalle Bayreuth, and in its own concert halls.

Steingraeber grand and upright pianos are featured in concert halls around the world, including the Berliner Philharmonie, Malmö Opera, and La Scala in Milan.

Since 1982, Wagner adaptations by Uwe Hoppe and the Studiobühne Bayreuth have been performed in the inner courtyard and rococo garden of the Steingraeber Haus. Changing exhibitions are shown in the gallery. In addition to music and music-historical themes, artists such as Alfred Hrdlicka have also exhibited there.

Today, over 30 employees, including twelve piano makers, specialize in the traditional manufacture of quality pianos. For example, only solid wood and not particle board is ever used. Steingraeber even treats the surfaces of the piano case with shellac and wax instead of polyester and synthetic resin varnishes. Innovatively, a very light grand piano lid was designed that weighs only one-third of an ordinary lid when completely acoustically preserved. The company also trains piano and harpsichord builders.

Over 40,000 grand and upright pianos have been produced since the company was founded. The product line includes three models of upright pianos and five types of grand pianos. The company is represented annually at major piano and grand piano trade shows, including the NAMM Show.

Steingraeber was the official instrument partner for the film The Magic Flute produced by Roland Emmerich in 2022. The same year saw the opening of a permanent exhibition of the world's largest collection of photographs of Franz Liszt.

In connection with the continuation of the company by the seventh generation, Fanny and Alban Steingraeber, the brand logo was changed and the "& Söhne" was deleted.

== Developments and innovations ==
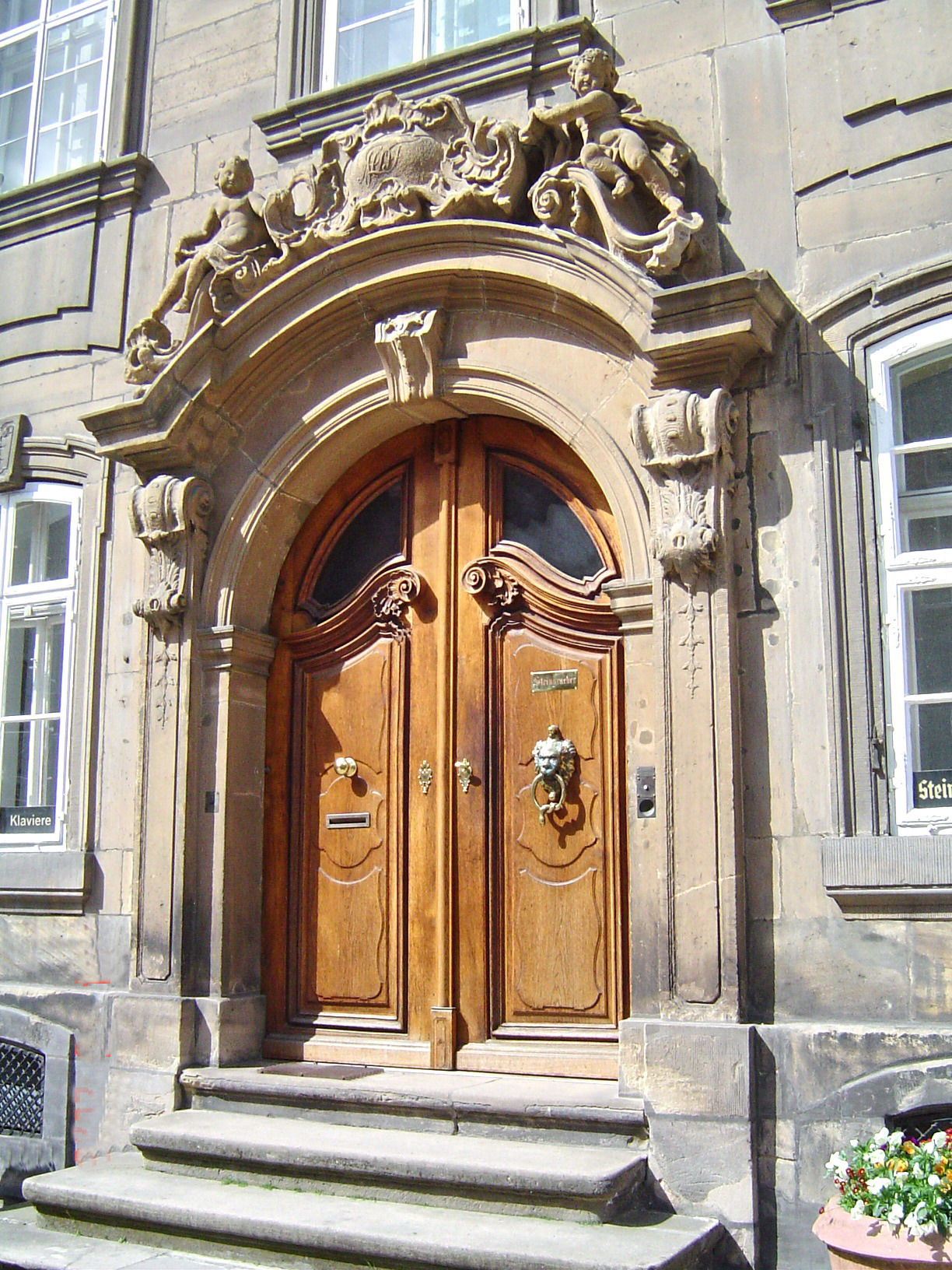
Steingraeber Haus, detail

=== Sordino ===
Steingraeber offers a function called Sordino for grand pianos. This allows a felt to be slid between the hammer and the strings, enabling tone changes in a variety of ways. The innovation goes back to a suggestion by pianist Jura Margulis. The technique is known from the late 18th century, but disappeared from pianos in the 19th century. The name comes from the similarity to the sordino of stringed instruments, although this has nothing to do with the built-in technique so far.

The technique achieved a great degree of fame through recordings by Martha Argerich and Martin Stadtfeld.

=== Mozart-Rail ===
In contrast to 18th century pianos, today's instruments have a much higher key depth. Fortepianos had a key depth of 5 mm, today's pianos up to more than 10 mm. As a result, pianists are faced with the challenge that fast repetition of notes is more difficult with old styles of playing. For this purpose, Steingraeber offers the possibility of having a version called the Mozart Rail built into the instrument, as a knee or hand lever. With it, it is possible to adjust the key depth, making it easier to play older works that were designed for a low key depth.

=== Transducer ===
In 2017 Steingraeber presented for the first time the grand piano model with transducers, which was created in cooperation with Robert HP Platz and the Experimental Studio of the SWR. These set the soundboard in vibration. By means of the software Pianoteq it is possible that even historical tunings and different sound characteristics can be transmitted together with all possible music and sound recordings. Platz composed his own pieces specially designed for this technology.

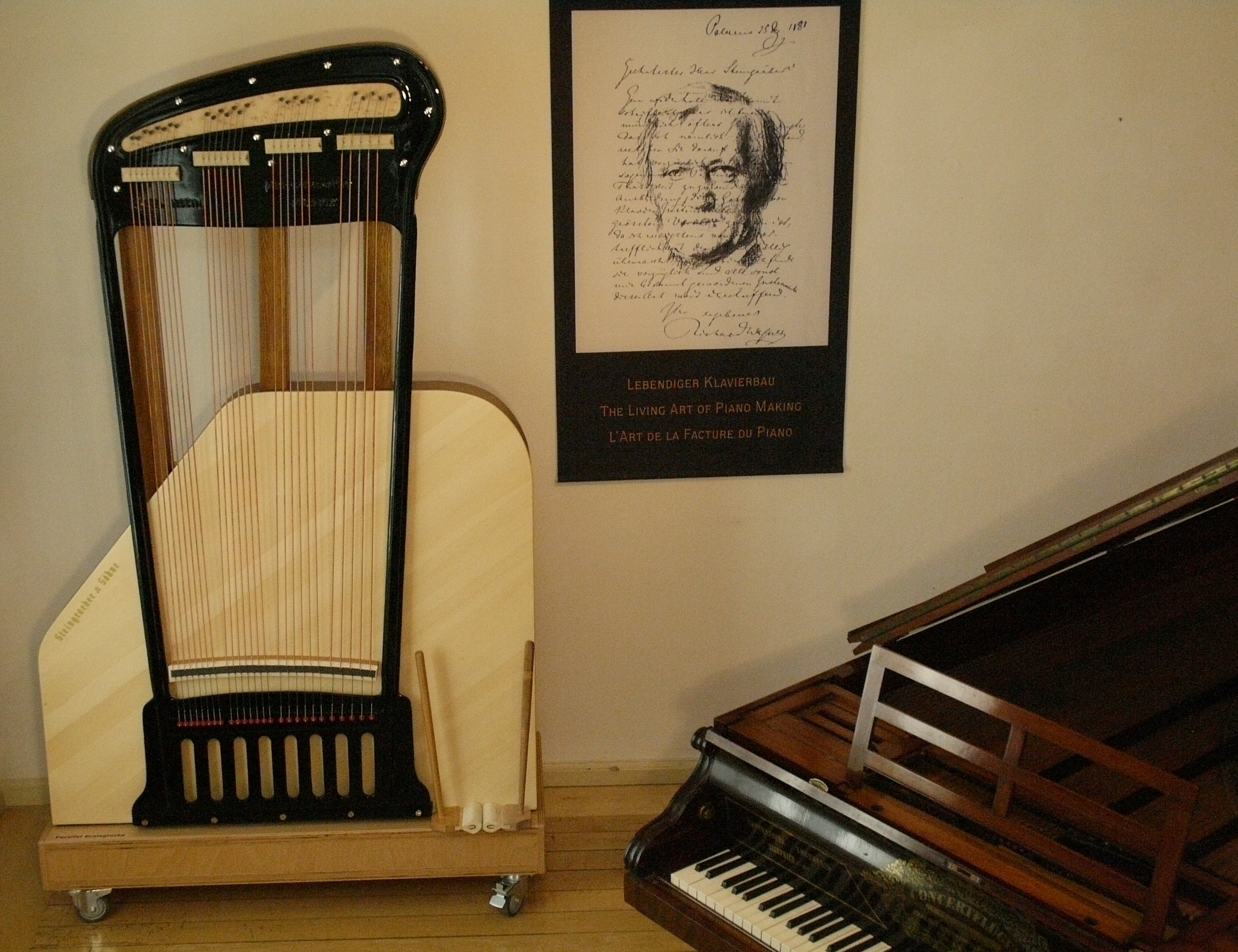
Parsifal-Grail Bell Piano, displayed at the Steingraeber Haus

=== Other innovations ===
In addition to all kinds of other innovations and equipment options, Steingraeber offers its instruments optionally with especially narrow keyboards and it has developed its own special pedal system for wheelchair users, as well as its own muting mechanism.

At the 2008 Musikmesse Frankfurt, the new grand piano model with a length of 232 cm was presented, and also a grand piano with a soundboard made of carbon. The purpose of such a construction is to increase the stability of the tuning of instruments that are exposed to extreme climatic fluctuations, such as grand pianos that are located in the tropics or played at open-air concerts.

The action of the left pedal is extended: Stepping on the left pedal, this first causes the usual shifting of the action. If pressing the pedal even further, the hammers lift closer to the strings, similar to the pianino. This makes it easier to play in extreme pianissimo.

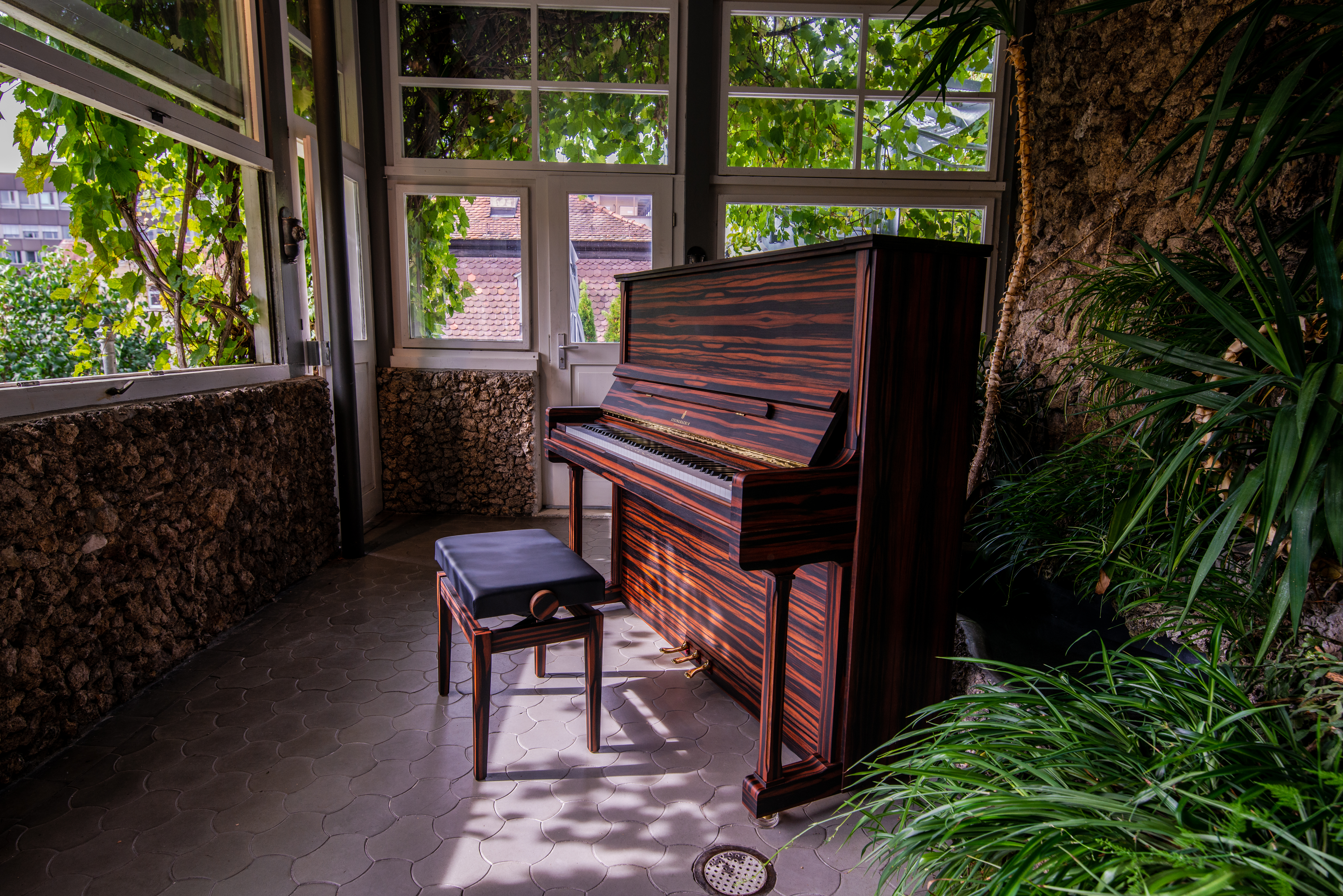
Upright piano 138 in Markassar verneer (2022)

Steingraeber has developed an alternative way of guiding the strings over the bridge for the Phönix model, based on considerations that had already been implemented on a trial basis earlier. Normally, the strings are guided over the bridge by two bridge pins in a zigzag pattern. In the alternative using roller bridge clamp gaffs, the string is pressed onto the bridge from above by a metal roller. In addition, the string pressure is adjustable by means of a height-adjustable attachment pin. The idea behind this design is to ensure even string pressure on the bridge and thus better energy transfer, and to optimize tunability and tuning due to the elimination of the high friction between the strings and the bridge pins. For the time being, these special features are not included as standard in grand piano production, but can be ordered as an option at extra cost. At Steingraeber, a ball bearing is available as an alternative to the normal, leathered hammer roller of the grand piano action. This allows for a lower friction release of the striker and an improvement in repetition.

For pianos, Steingraeber developed the Steingraeber Ferro Magnet (SFM) mechanism, in which magnets are supposed to contribute to a more grand piano-like playing feel. Instead of a spring, magnets built into the tip of the pin and the hammer nut return the pin to its engaged position after release. This system is maintenance-free and results in more accurate and faster repetition.

== Models ==
Upright pianos are manufactured in sizes of 122 cm and 130 cm in height; the Steingraeber concert piano 138 is also currently the largest upright series piano.

The five grand piano models include the salon grand of 170 cm and 192 cm in length, the chamber concert grand of 212 cm, the semi-concert grand of 232 cm, and the concert grand of 276 cm.

The production of the smallest piano takes about seven months, and the production of the largest grand piano takes about 14 months. Steingraeber builds about one hundred instruments a year.

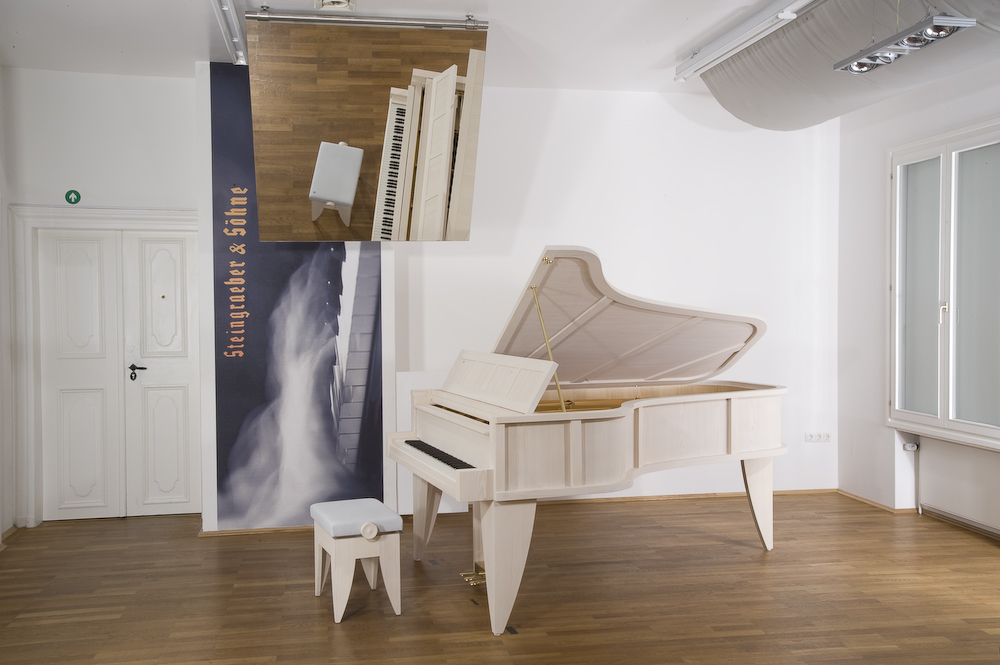
Steingraeber grand piano designed by Jørn Utzon

Also special models are made. In addition to the selection from various types of wood and furniture shapes, this extends to artistic and visionary design creations. Famous designers have already included Bruno Paul and Jørn Utzon.

== Awards and recognition ==
Steingraeber has received numerous prizes and awards throughout its corporate history. The piano in the height of 138 cm was awarded as the world's best and has the quality of a grand piano. The concert piano and the Transducer grand piano were named "Germany's Favorite" in 2022 by the SZ Institute and Statista.

In 2018, the company was honored with the Export Award of Bavaria in the crafts category, as well as the Future Award of the Chamber of Crafts for Upper Franconia.

Since 2022, Steingraeber has been part of the German Standards – Marken des Jahrhunderts (Brands of the century) published by Florian Langenscheidt and the publisher of the ZEIT. In the same year, the company received the Monument Award of the District of Upper Franconia.

Together with instruments from C. Bechstein, Blüthner, Bösendorfer, Fazioli, Sauter Piano Manufaktur and Steinway & Sons, Steingraeber is counted among the top class in the field of pianos and grand pianos.
