= Strich & Zeidler =

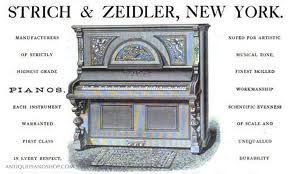
Advertisement for a Stirch & Zeidler piano

Strich & Zeidler was a piano manufacturing company in the United States. The company was founded by William Strich in 1889 in New York City.

Strich & Zeidler was known for building extremely well made, high priced pianos in elaborate styles and finishes. Its instruments gained praise from Petrowitsch Bissing of the Bissing Conservatory of Music. The company also built pianos under the "Homer" brand name as a lower priced choice compared to the higher priced Strich & Zeidler models.

The company manufactured pianos in modest numbers but experienced success until going out of business during The Great Depression.

== See also ==
- List of piano makers
