= James Whiting Vose =

James Whiting Vose

James Whiting Vose (21 October 1818 – 31 December 1904) was an American piano manufacturer who founded the firm Vose & Sons.

== Biography ==
The son of Whiting Vose, James Whiting Vose was born in Milton, Massachusetts on 21 October 1818. After graduating from Milton Academy in 1834 he apprenticed as a cabinet maker. At the age of 21 he began working at a piano factory in Boston; receiving a thorough grounding in the building of pianos at this factory in the years 1839 to 1846.

In 1846 Vose began making his own piano and organ keys. In 1851 he manufactured his first piano; establishing his own piano manufacturing business that year. In 1855 the piano key manufacturing portion of the company was sold off. Vose trained his three sons (Irving, Willard, and Julian Vose) in the art of piano making, and the firm became known as Vose & Sons when they joined the enterprise.

Vose & Sons grew into one of the leading piano manufacturing companies in the United States during the 19th century, and became a publicly traded company in 1889 with James Vose serving as the company's first president . His son Willard succeeded him in leading the company, and was serving as general manager of the Vose & Sons at the time of his death. Willard continued to lead the company until his death in 1929. After this Vose & Sons was acquired by the Aeolian Company who continued to make pianos using the Vose name.

Vose died on in Brookline, Massachusetts on 31 December 1904.
