= William E. Wheelock =

American businessman (1852–1922)

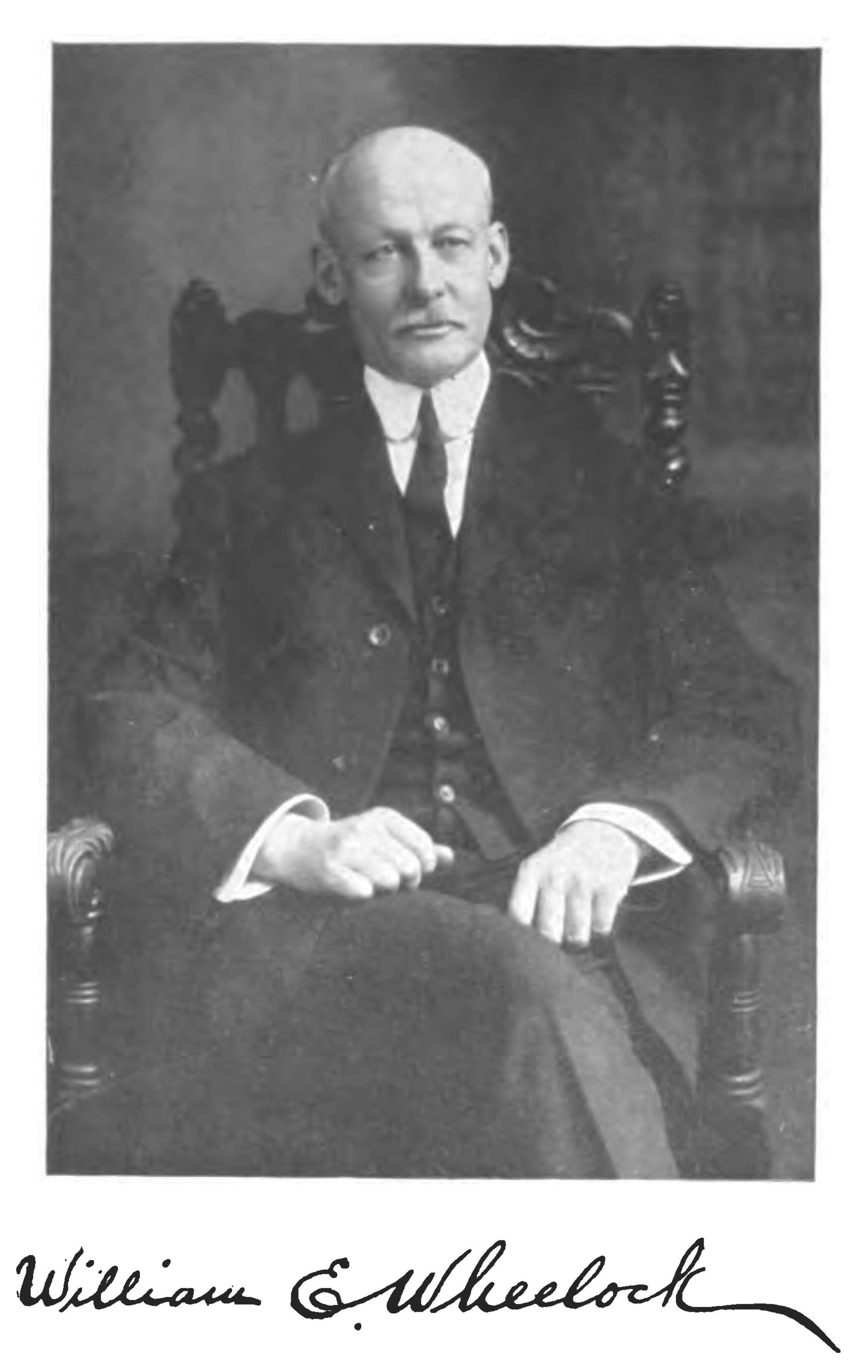
Photograph of William Erving Wheelock. Published in Pianos and Their Makers: A Comprehensive History of the Development of the Piano from the Monochord to the Concert Grand Player Piano.

William Erving Wheelock (September 24, 1852 – February 14, 1922) was an American piano manufacturer and businessman.

== Life and career ==
The son of Adam Dexter Wheelock and Laura A. Wheelock, William Erving Wheelock was born on September 24, 1852, in Brooklyn, New York. His father was the first president of the Nassau Trust Company of Brooklyn. He married his first wife, Anna Frances Crandall, in Providence, Rhode Island, on March 10, 1885. He married his second wife, Esther L. Giese, in Brooklyn on April 15, 1912.

Wheelock entered the piano manufacturing business in 1873 as a partner in the firm of Billings & Wheelock. This firm dissolved in 1877 and that same year he began manufacturing his own pianos under the name of the Wheelock Piano Company (WPC). He built a large factory on 149th Street in New York City. It specialized in making high quality pianos which were just a small step away from the highest quality instruments on the market. In 1886 he established a second piano company, the Stuyvesant Piano Company, which made a less expensive mid-grade piano. These pianos were made in a separate second factory, but both it and the WPC factory were under the same management.

In 1892 Wheelock acquired the Weber Piano Company which he led under both the WPC and Weber-Wheelock Company names. His partners in the firm at this time were Charles B. Lawson and John W. Mawson. The Weber piano was considered a top quality instrument at the highest end of the piano market, thus diversifying the WPC to offer three different pianos (Weber, Wheelock, and Stuyvesant) at varying qualities and price points.

Wheelock was head of the WPC until 1903 when it was acquired by Harry B. Tremain following a merger with the Aeolian Company. He remained with this merged organization as the Aeolian Company's treasurer.

Wheelock died in Brooklyn on February 14, 1922, at the age of 69. At the time of his death he was a trustee of the Nassau Trust Company, a position he held since 1910.
