= Th. Mann & Co. =

German piano factory

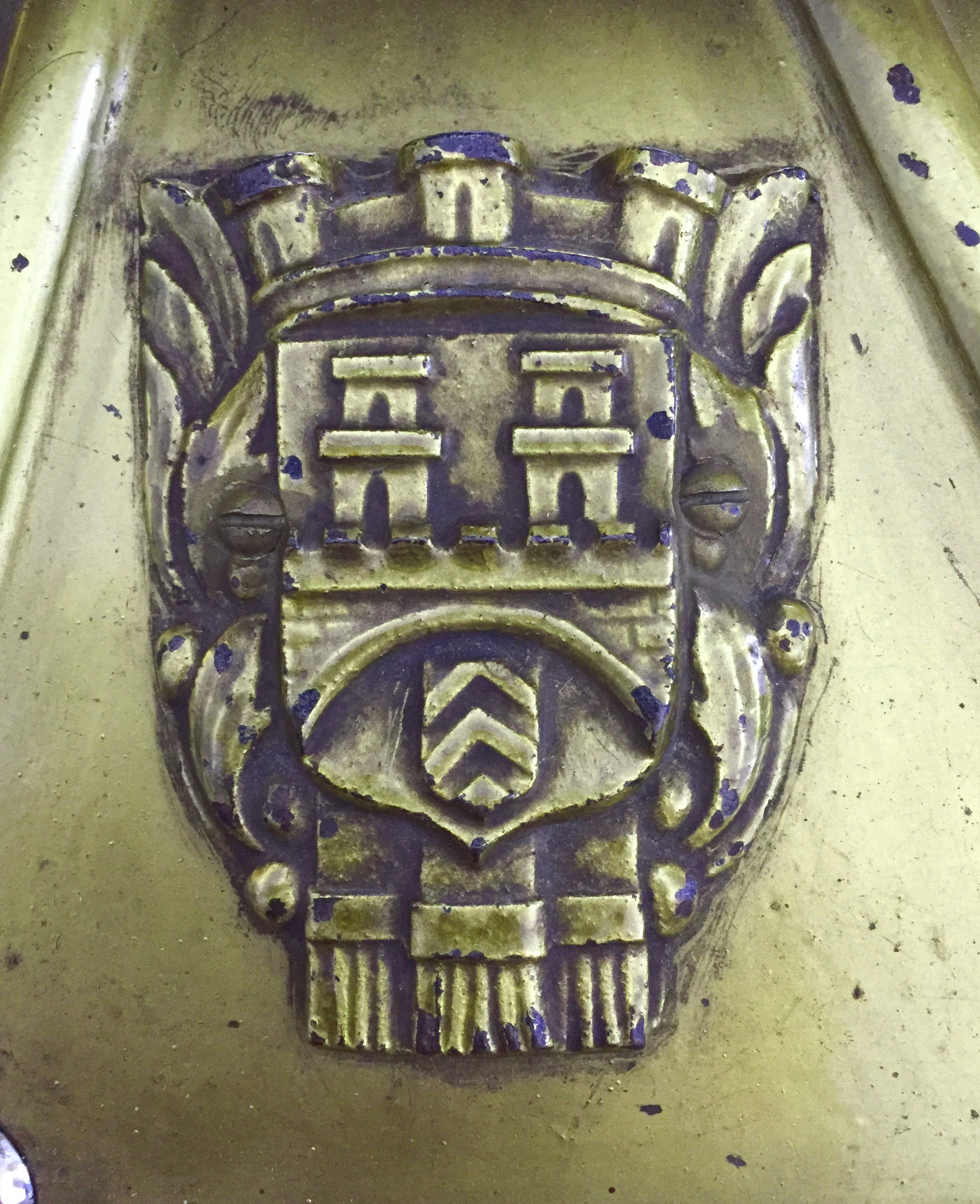
Trademark logo of Th. Mann & Co. on Grand Piano No. 16750

Th. Mann & Co. was a German piano factory, existing in Bielefeld, Prussian Province of Westphalia, from 1836 until 1942, as well as instrument shop for pianos and harmoniums with temporary branch offices in Gütersloh, Herford, Detmold, Rinteln and Paderborn.

== Christian Wilhelm Volkening ==
(occasionally J. Volkening, * around 1807 in Hille, † October 26, 1858 in Bielefeld)

Volkening was an apprentice with Andreas Streicher in Vienna. Following his apprenticeship he went with two other assistants, Klems and Sassenhof, to northern Germany. While Klems continued his work in Düsseldorf and Sassenhof in Bremen, Volkening founded his piano workshop 1836 in Bielefeld.

As a young instrument maker in Bielefeld, Volkening presented his grand pianos and uprights at the General German Trade Exhibition in Berlin in 1844, where he exhibited an upright and a grand piano with Streicher's patent mechanics, and at the first industrial exhibition of all peoples in London in 1851. In Berlin, his instruments were noticed by the professional audience: Volkening „lieferte in einem sowohl durch Ton als Spielart sehr ansprechenden Flügel und einen Pianino um so Verdienstlicheres, als ihm in dem kleinen Städtchen wohl schwerlich vorzügliche Muster zu Gebote stehen.“ (Roughly: [Volkening] delivered with an upright piano and grand piano with a very appealing tone and style of playing something even more meritorious considering that he could hardly find excellent model exemplars in this small town.) The following year Volkening received the bronze medal at the "Gewerbeproducenten" exhibition in Berlin.

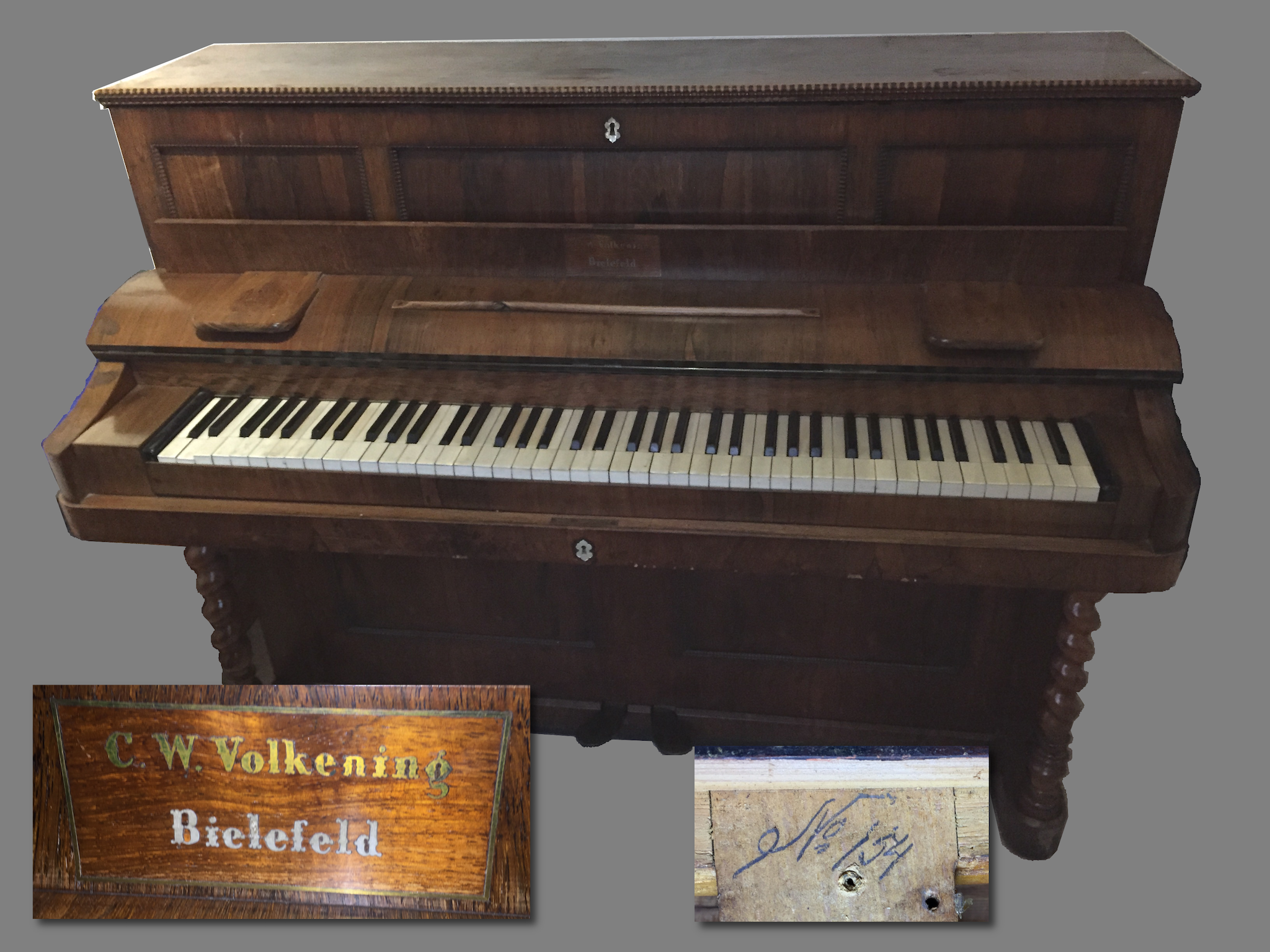
Volkening pianino number 154

Around 1840 Volkening made a mahogany veneered grand piano on vase-like legs and with maple inlaid jewelry, which was played by Franz Liszt on his concert tour in 1841. A personal inscription of Liszt testifies to this concert on the instrument: "Bielefeld - concert on November 13 F. Liszt." The instrument is now in the collection of the Museum of Musical Instruments of the University of Leipzig.

After own statement of the later factory Th. Mann & Co Volkening made one of the first baby grand piano, which design idea was recognized by a Saxon princess at a concert in Bad Oeynhausen 1850/51 and afterwards brought to Dresden.

C. W. Volkening founded his business allegedly in the so-called "Kühneschen Haus" at Kreuzstraße 565 in Bielefeld and employed 6 assistants.

== Theophil Mann sen. ==
(Occasionally also Theophilus Mann or Theodor Mann, * April 14, 1831, † June 21, 1913)

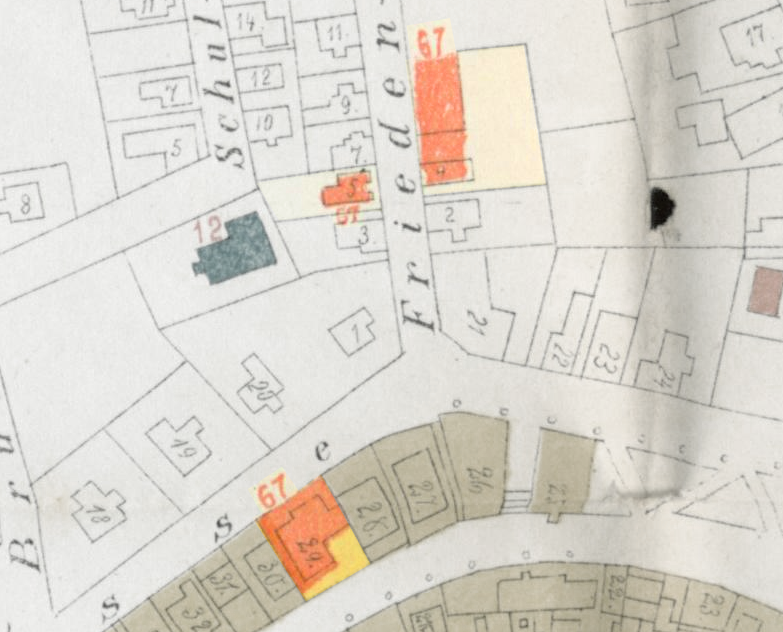
Highlighted locations of Th. Mann & Co., published in "Plan der Stadt Bielefeld gez. von H. Gier, Bielefeld, Pfeffer 1886

Theophil Mann was born the son of a master ropemaker in Hildesheim. Following his schooldays, he completed a carpentry apprenticeship before gaining an insight into piano construction in the workshop of the court instrument maker J. H. Weykopf in Hanover from 1848 onwards. After a short period, he returned to Hildesheim and worked with organ builder Heinrich Schaper. In 1849 C. W. Volkening called him to Bielefeld. Under Volkening, Th. Mann studied the piano construction industry from the ground up. To deepen his knowledge, Mann made in 1853 visits in the workshops of Ernst Irmler junior in Leipzig, Eduard Voigt and Karl Rönisch in Dresden, Karl Schönberner in Bautzen, Alois Bieber in Munich and Carl Blädel in Stuttgart.

After the death of Volkening, Theophil Mann took over the workshop and continued as "Pianoforte=Fabrik Th. Mann, Bielefeld" (pianoforte factory). His goal was the production of high-quality pianos with a well-trained staff. In the beginning of the company Theophil Mann sen. employed nine workers. The production quality had an effect on the instrument sales, and its increase made it necessary to expand the workshop.

In 1868 the new building at Oberntorwall 29 in Bielefeld was completed and the factory moved out of the building Kreuzstrasse 565.

Like Volkening before, Th. Mann sent exhibits to numerous industrial exhibitions in Germany and abroad. At the Industrial and Art Exhibition in London in 1862, Theophil Mann showed "a pianino with the device (...) of a 'movable hammer chair' instead of the Pédales céleste."

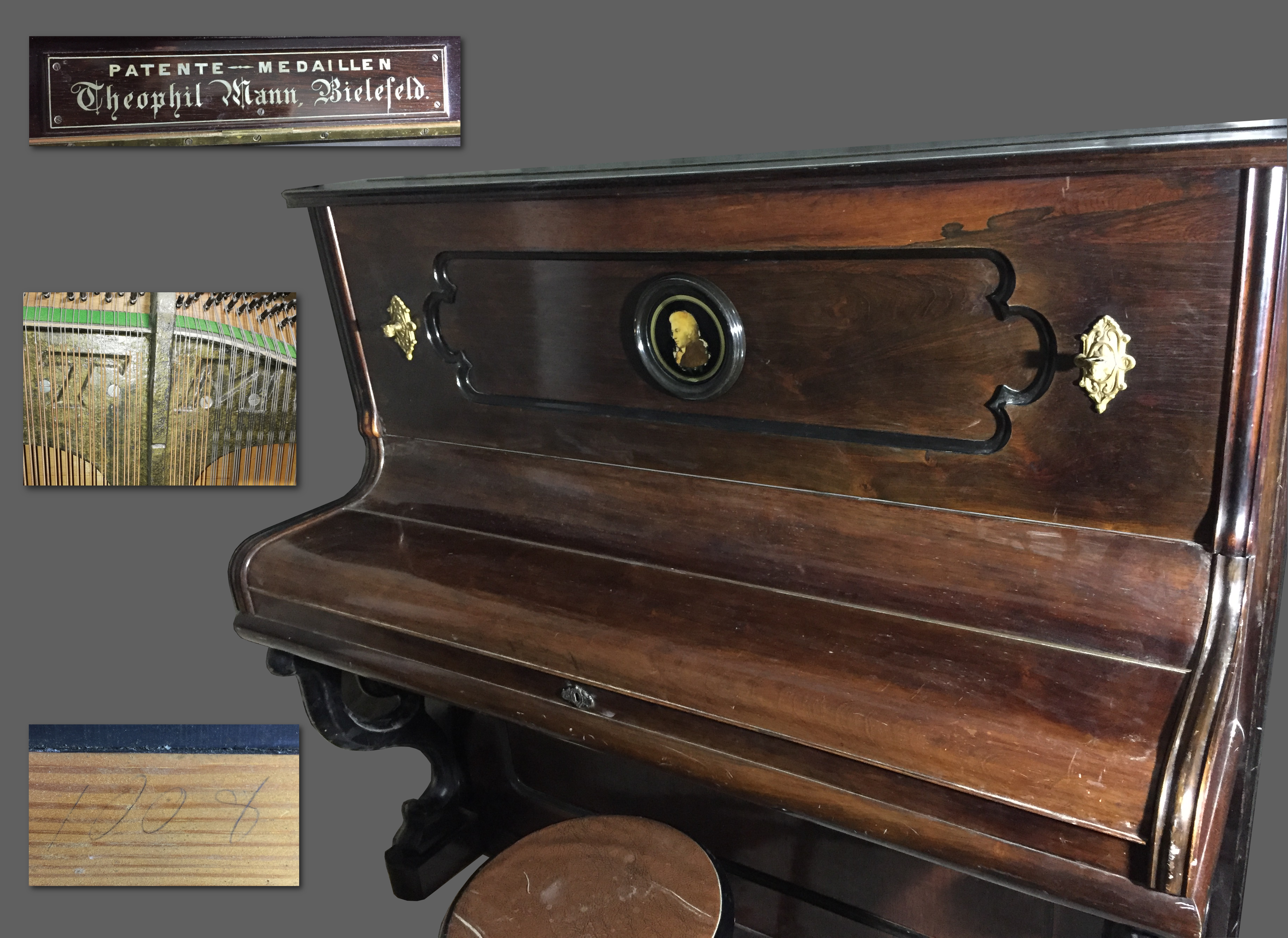
Pianino number 1008 by Theophil Mann, around 1873

For the year 1871, it is noted in the catalog of the Vienna World Fair in 1873 that Th. Mann employed 20 workers and produced 120 instruments that year, the sale of which made a revenue 24,000 Thaler.

In 1873, Th. Mann presented at the world exhibition in Vienna three pianos for which he received a medal for merit. A cross-stringed piano for 975 Reichsmark, a straight-stringed instrument for 822 Rmk and a diagonal-stringed piano for 675 Rmk were on display. The ingenuity of the instrument maker, the solid construction of the pianos and their "noble (soft) tone" were emphasized.

Shortly before the arrival of Hermann Steinhaus, the pianoforte factory Th. Mann employed 40 workers.

=== Private life ===
On September 14, 1896, Th. Mann and his wife Sophie Mann, b. Oldermann (born July 7, 1839, † January 7, 1915) celebrated their silver wedding with relatives, friends and employees.

=== Social Commitment ===
Theophil man sen. was on the board of the von Bodelschwinghsche Anstalten (today Stiftungen) and initiated, together with Friedrich von Bodelschwingh the society "Arbeiterheim", which had the goal to create cheap livingspace for factory workers in Bielefeld.

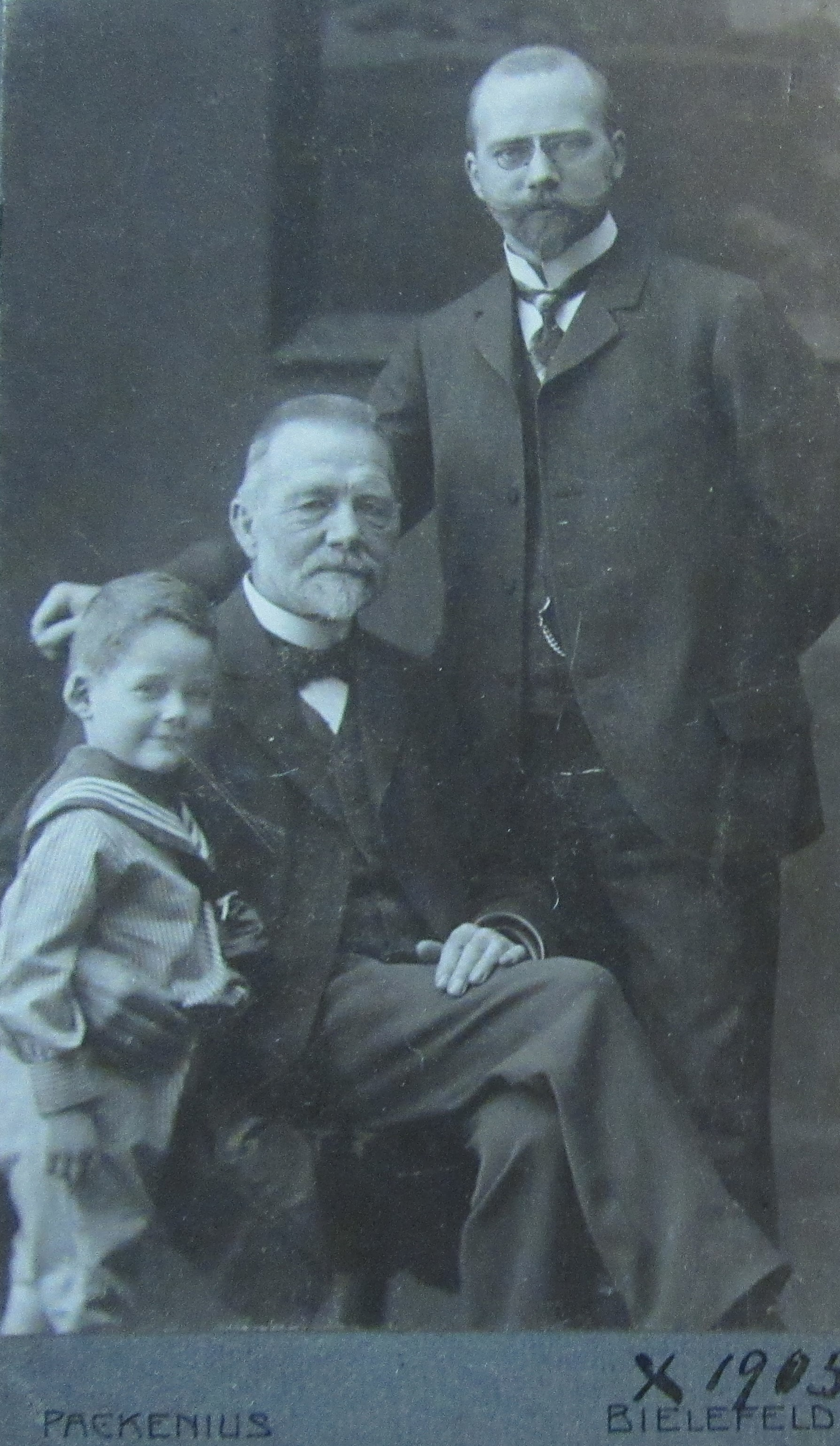
Th. Mann sen., Th. Mann jun. and Theodore H. Mann, around 1906

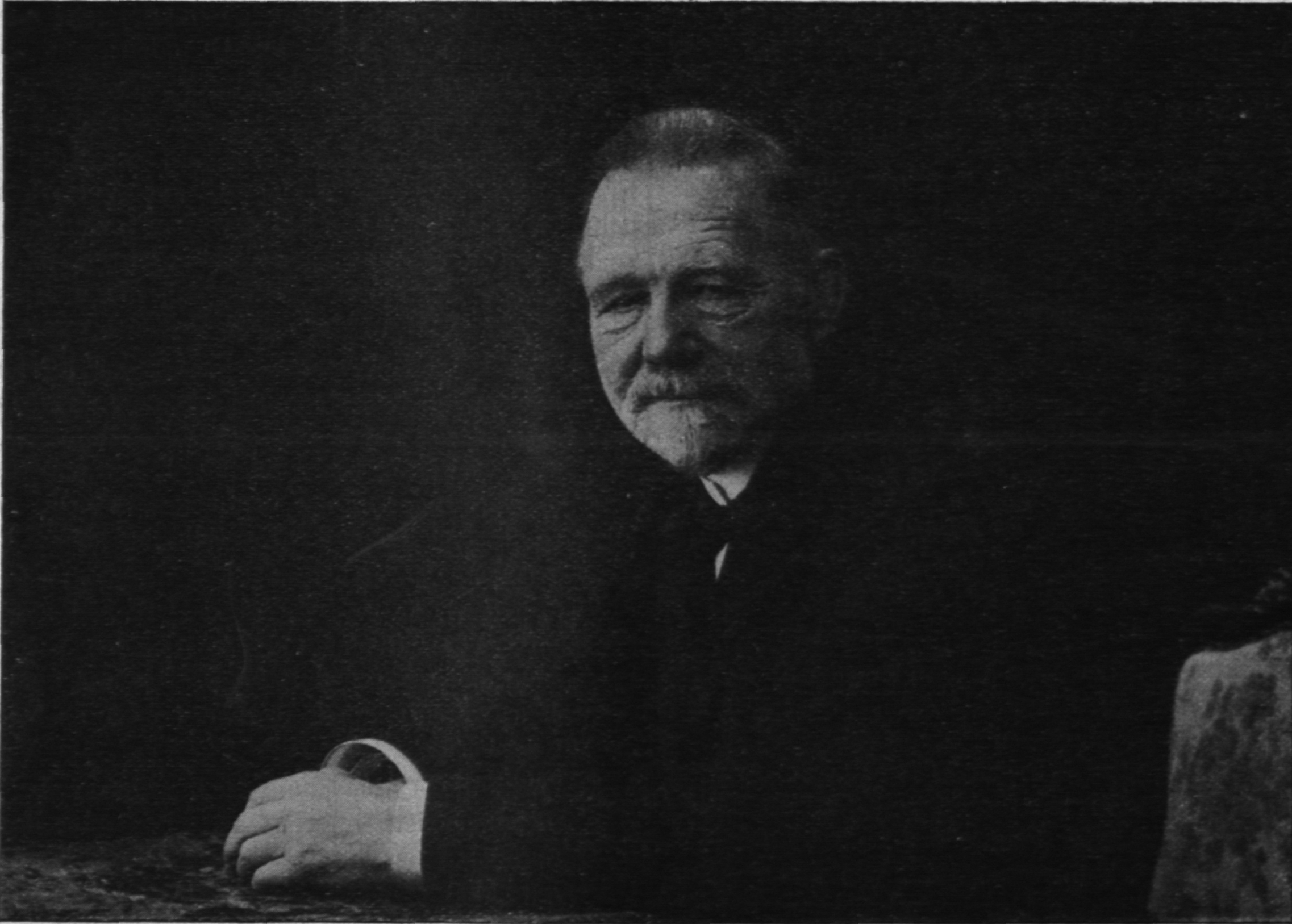
Theophil Mann sen., ca. 1900

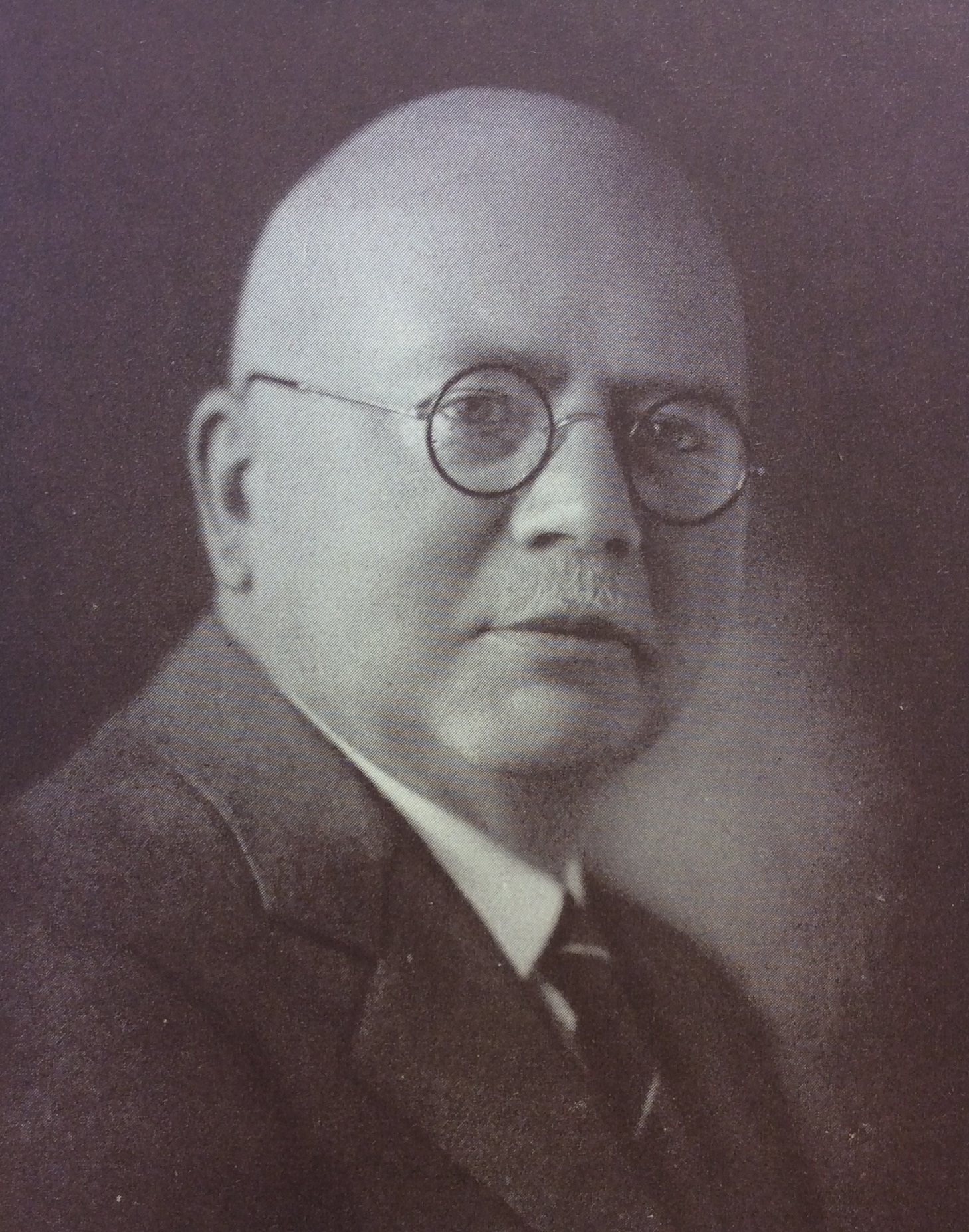
Theophil Mann jun., ca. 1930

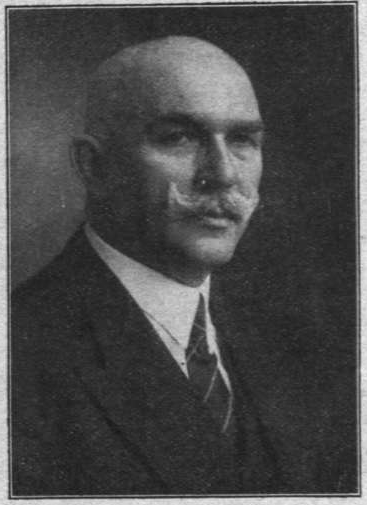
Max Porth, around 1935

== Hermann Steinhaus & Th. Mann & Co. ==
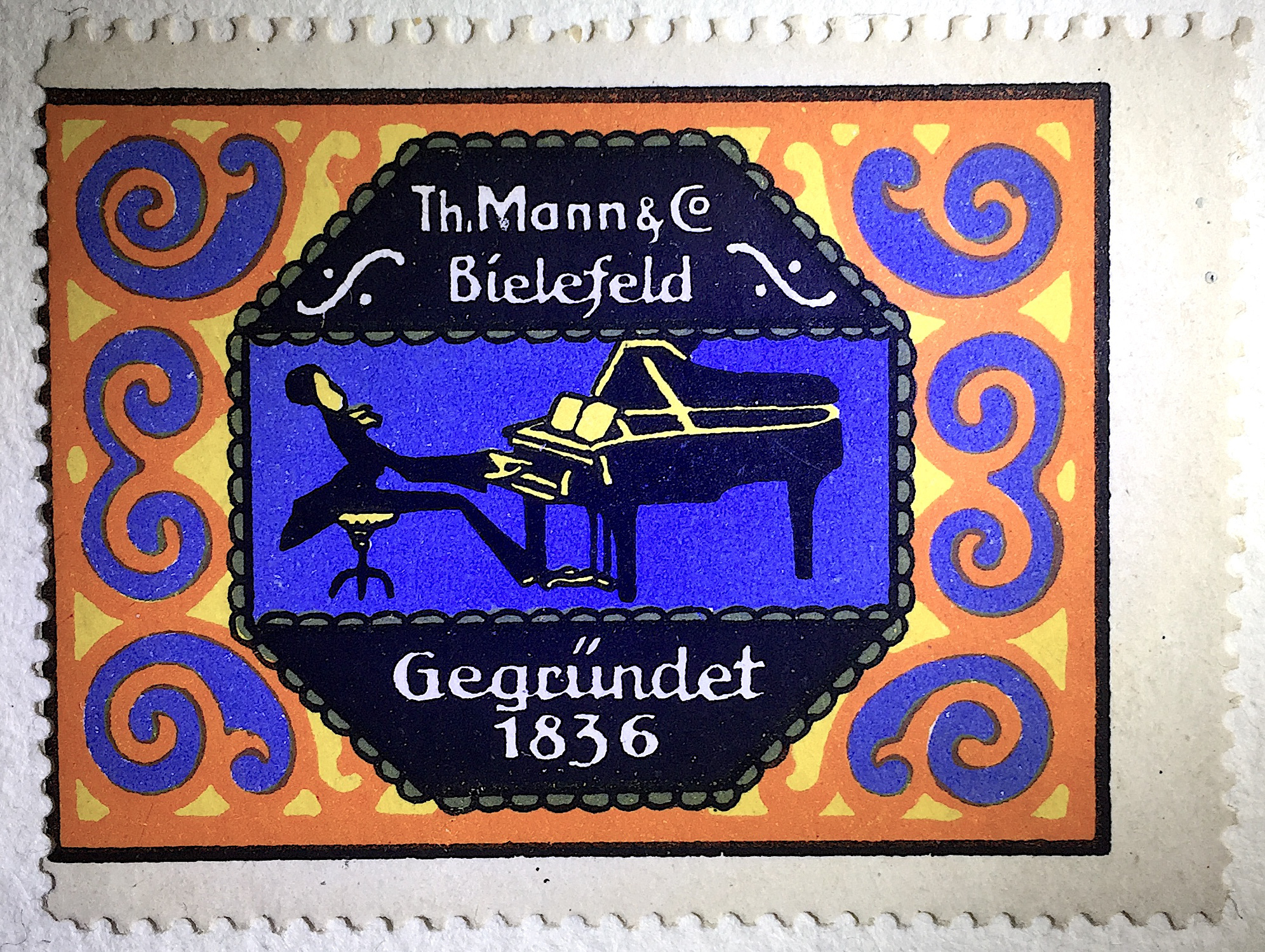
Advertisement stamp

(Occasionally Wilhelm Steinhaus, * July 17, 1850, † February 9, 1933)

Hermann Steinhaus was offspring of a respected family from Barmen. Steinhaus came to Bielefeld at the age of 22 and joined the piano factory Th. Mann as partner. From 1972 the factory was trading under the name Th. Mann & Co or Th. Mann & Cie. In some publications, the name was shortened to Mann & Co. or Mann & Cie.

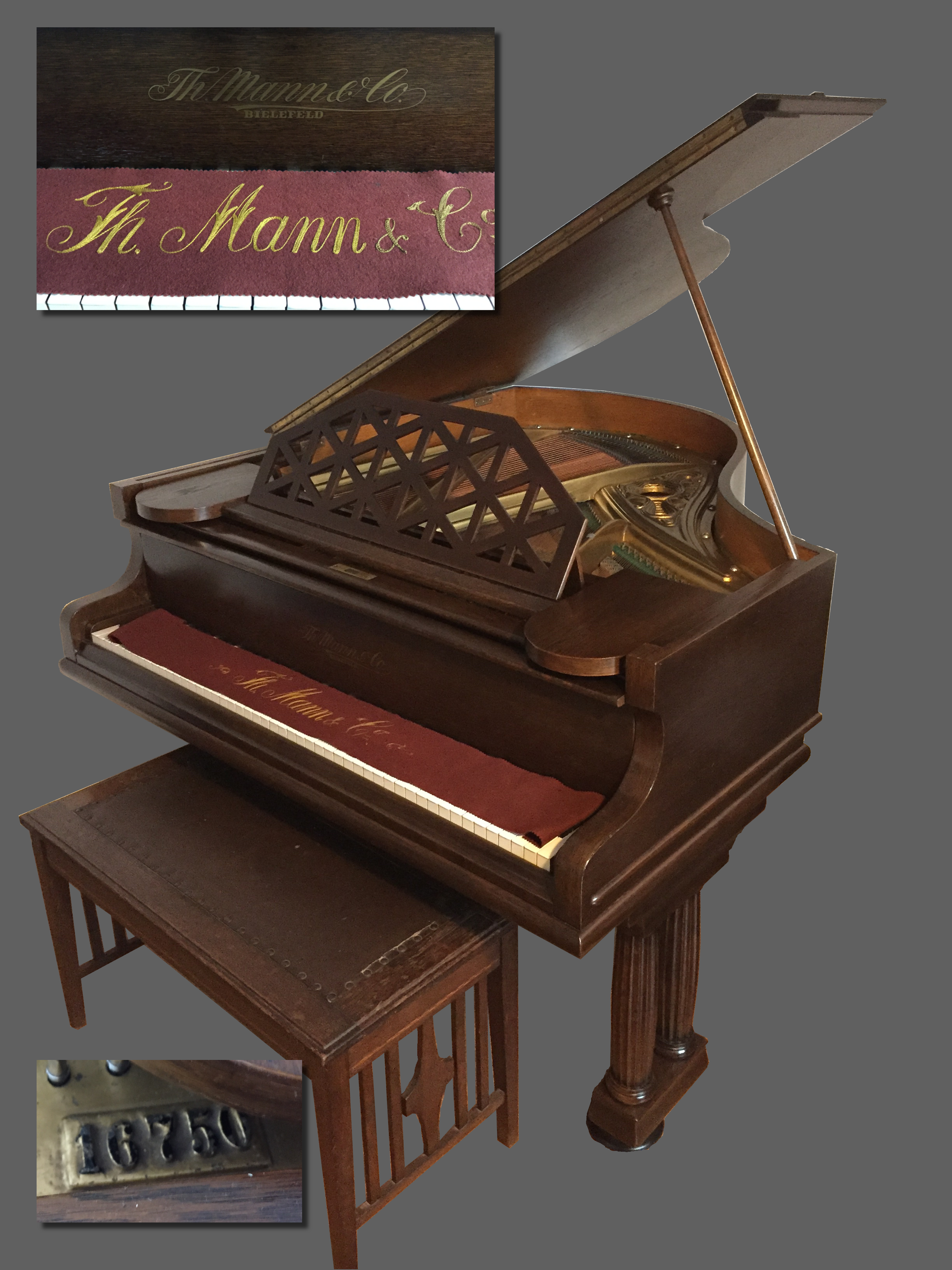
So called "Stutzflügel" (baby grand piano) by Th. Mann & Co. from 1911

In 1875, Th. Mann & Co. began erecting new buildings at the nearby Friedenstraße and the fabrication was converted to steam operation, which resulted in an increase of the body of workers.

In the early morning hours of October 19, 1879, a fire broke out in the engine room of the factory, which was located towards the Grabenstrasse. With great effort of the local fire brigades it could be contained and extinguished without spilling over to adjacent buildings. According to the company's own information, the damage was minor.

H. Steinhaus and Th. Mann were able to increase the quality and quantity of production, which was reflected in numerous acquired medals. The company scored a bronze medal for pianos in Düsseldorf in 1880. At the Amsterdam Colonial Exhibition in 1883, the company won a gold medal for pianinos. Likewise at the Antwerp International Exhibition in 1885, Th. Mann & Co. scored "the golden medal as a prize of first class for their pianinos." Th. Mann & Co also achieved a golden medal for pianos at the World's Fair in Brussels in 1888. Later, at the Düsseldorf exhibition in 1902 they were able to achieve a silver medal.

In 1883 Th. Mann & Co. already employed 70 workers.

=== Social Commitment ===
Hermann Steinhaus worked for years as a presbyter of the Neustädter Marienkirchengemeinde in Bielefeld.

== Theophil Mann jr. ==
(* 8 February 1873, † March 18, 1935)

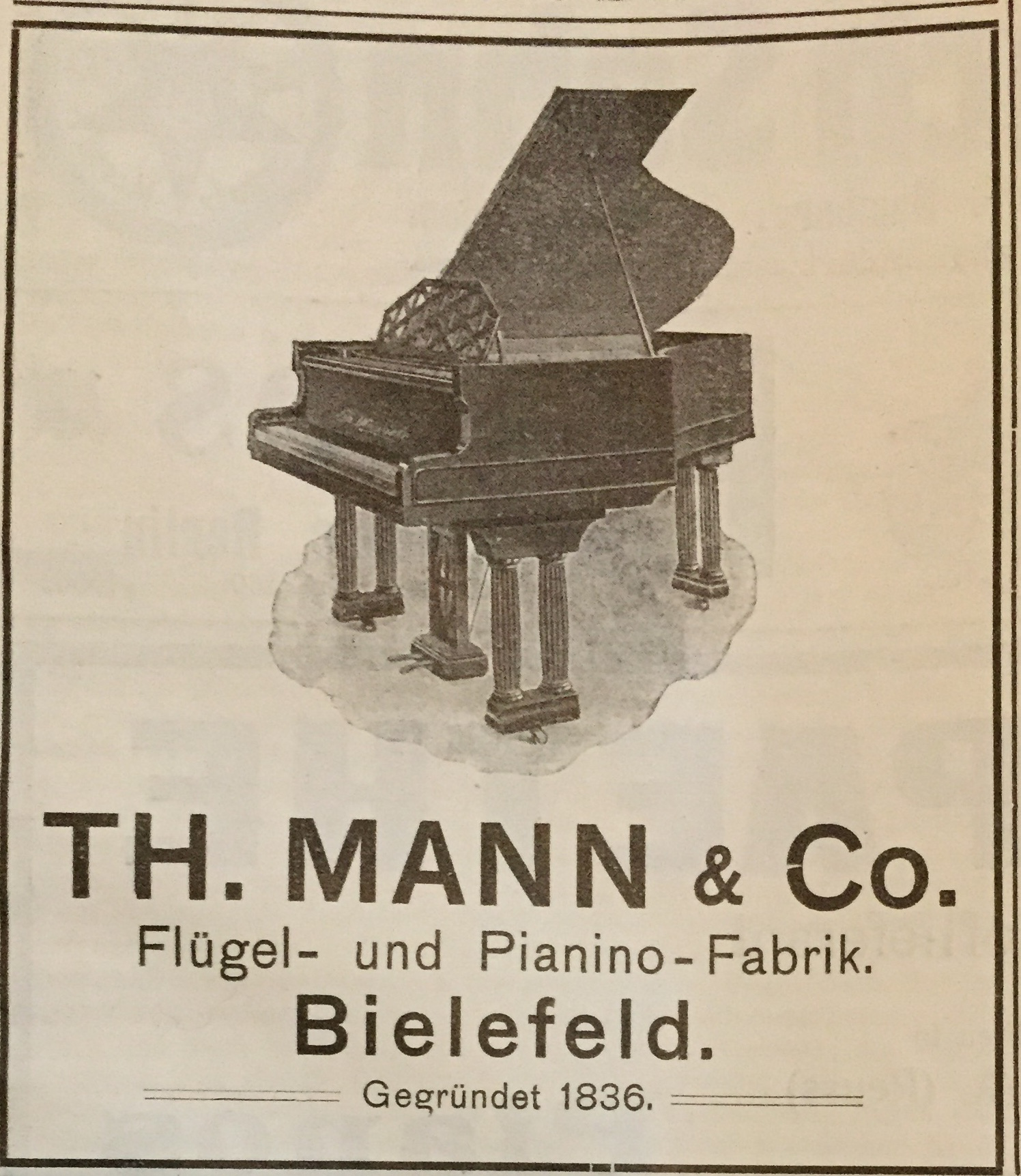
Advertisement of Th. Mann & Co in "Zeitschrift für Instrumentenbau" from 1. April 1911

Due to age, Th. Mann sen. retired in 1905, and his son, who studied at Steinway & Sons in New York, C. Bechstein in London and in Paris, took over the technical management of the company.

Shortly before the outbreak of the First World War, the factory employed 100 workers, who made a piano every five hours, whereby a wagon load was exported weekly by train. At this time Th. Mann pianos were shipped to England, Belgium, Italy and other European countries, as well as overseas.

In 1926, the company celebrated its 90th anniversary with an elaborate jubilee publication.

In the aftermath of the First World War and the loss of access to the world market, the factory operations were in 1930 finally reunited to the site Oberntorwall 29.

As a result of the death of Hermann Steinhaus in February 1933, Theophil Mann jun. became sole owner of the piano factory. Despite the dissolution of the company, the name Th. Mann & Co. continued to exist as a trademark.

== Helene Mann ==
(born Nacken, * October 7, 1878, † November 4, 1939) After the death of Theophil Mann jr., his wife continued the business.

The 100th anniversary was celebrated in 1936 with an extensive festival program.

== Max Porth ==
(* 1886, † 1943)

In 1942 the Berlin merchant and piano dealer Max Porth bought the factory. With that, the procuration of Rudolf Rosenberger ended. By that time, a business was in progress.

== End of production ==
Nothing is known about the actual stop of production. The highest opus number recorded in the literature is stated to be 20,000 for the year 1938. In most cases 1938 or 1939 are mentioned for the year the production discontinued.

The factory buildings were allegedly victims of the bombing in the Second World War, in which large parts of Bielefeld city center were destroyed. Aerial views of the 1950s show a vacant lot on the site of the parent company. Furthermore, the object Oberntorwall 29 is listed as totally destroyed for the post-war period.

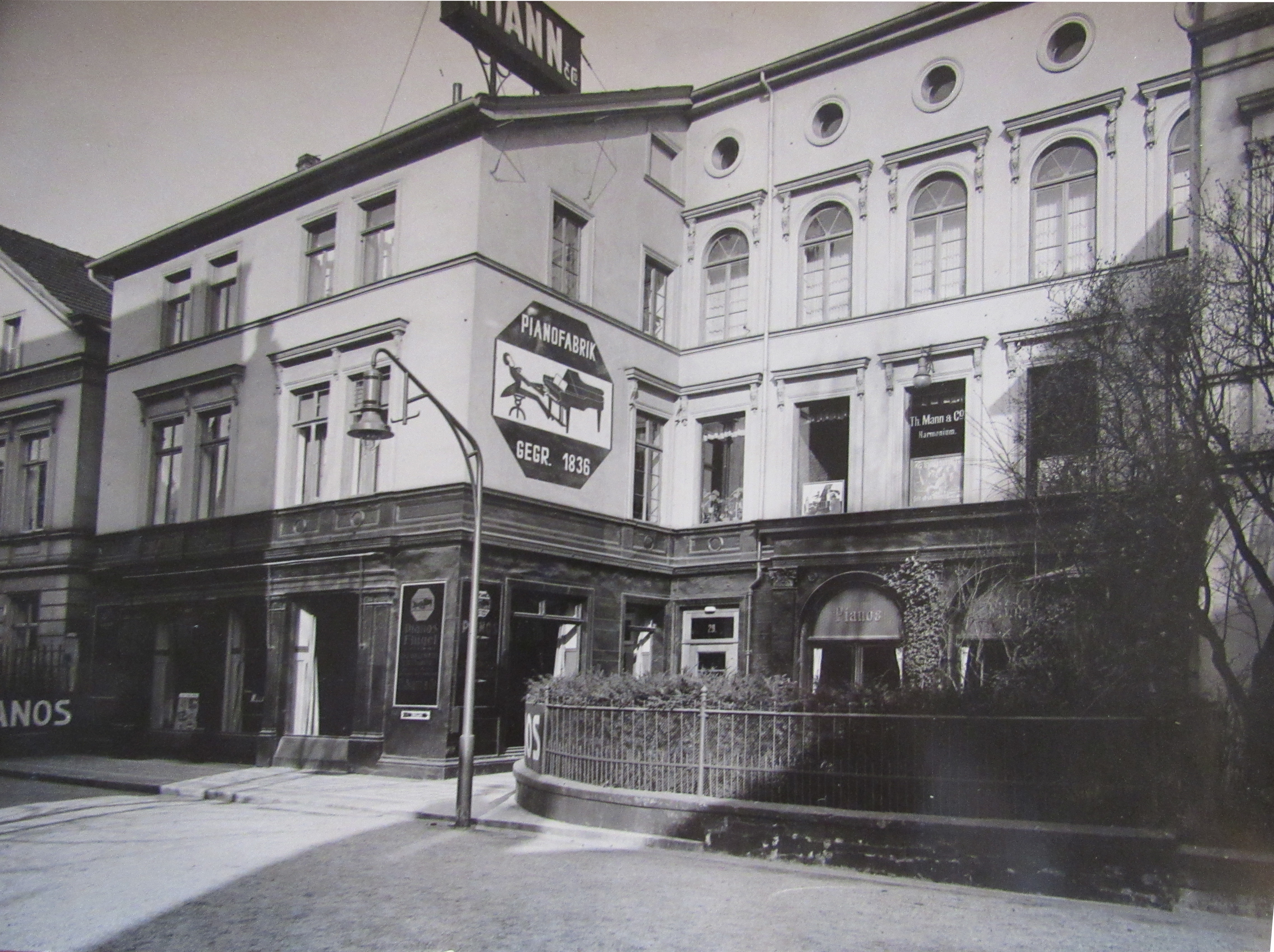
Main building at Oberntorwall 29

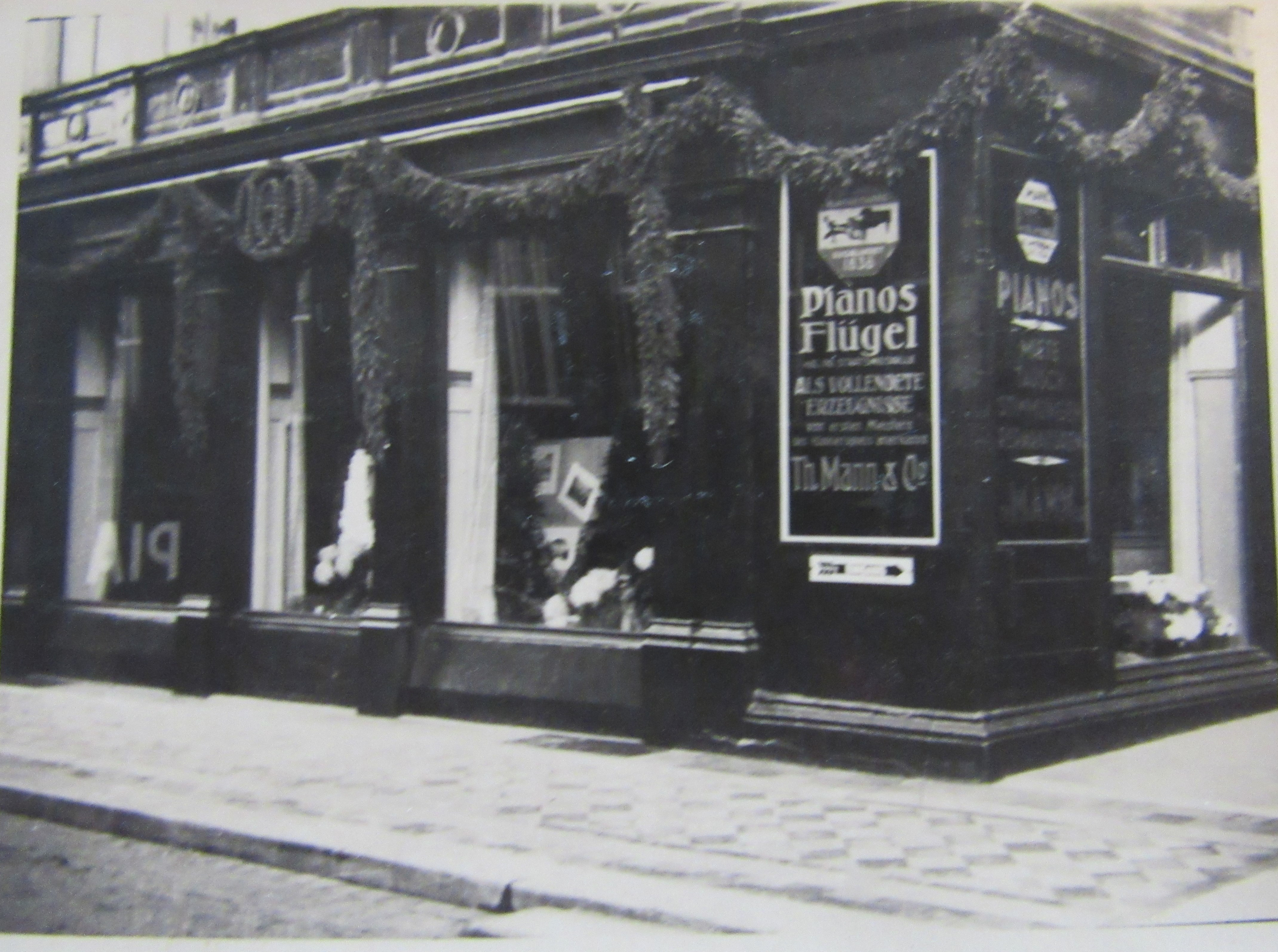
Decorated showroom at Oberntorwall 29, Oct. 1936

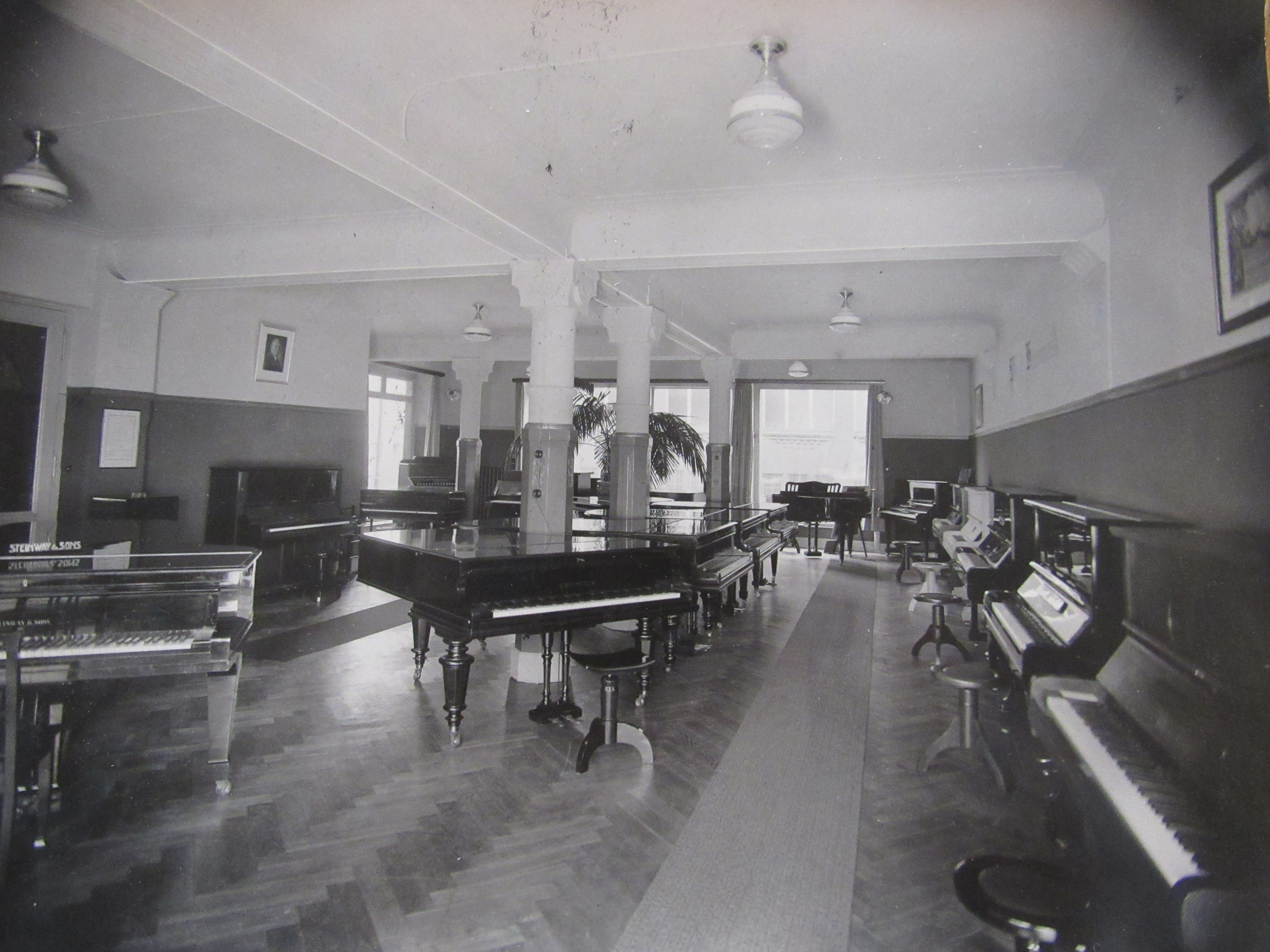
So called "Musiksaal" in main building, Oberntorwall 29

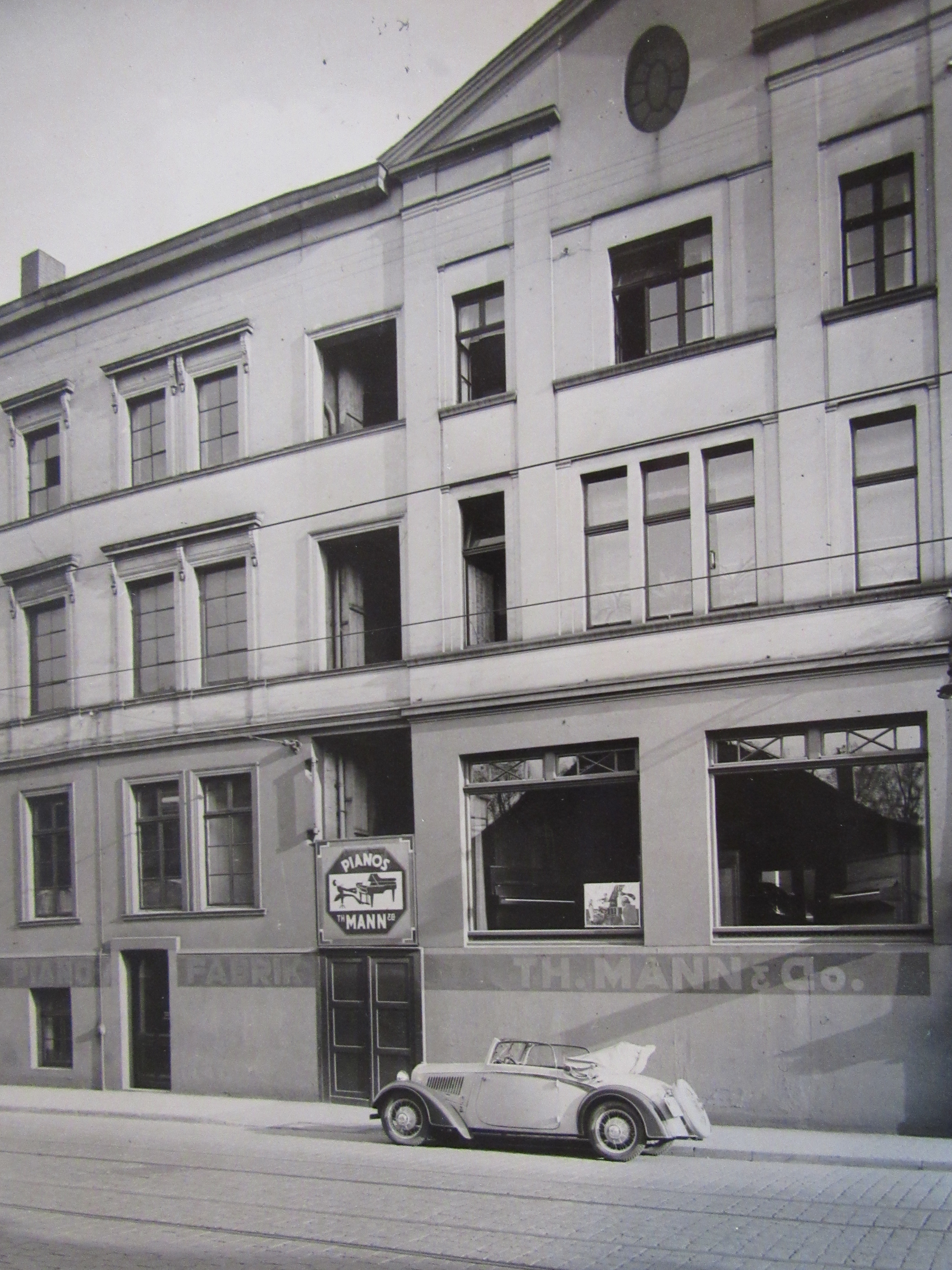
Main building of Th. Mann & Co., view from Oberwallstraße (also called Grabenstraße or Hindenburgstraße)

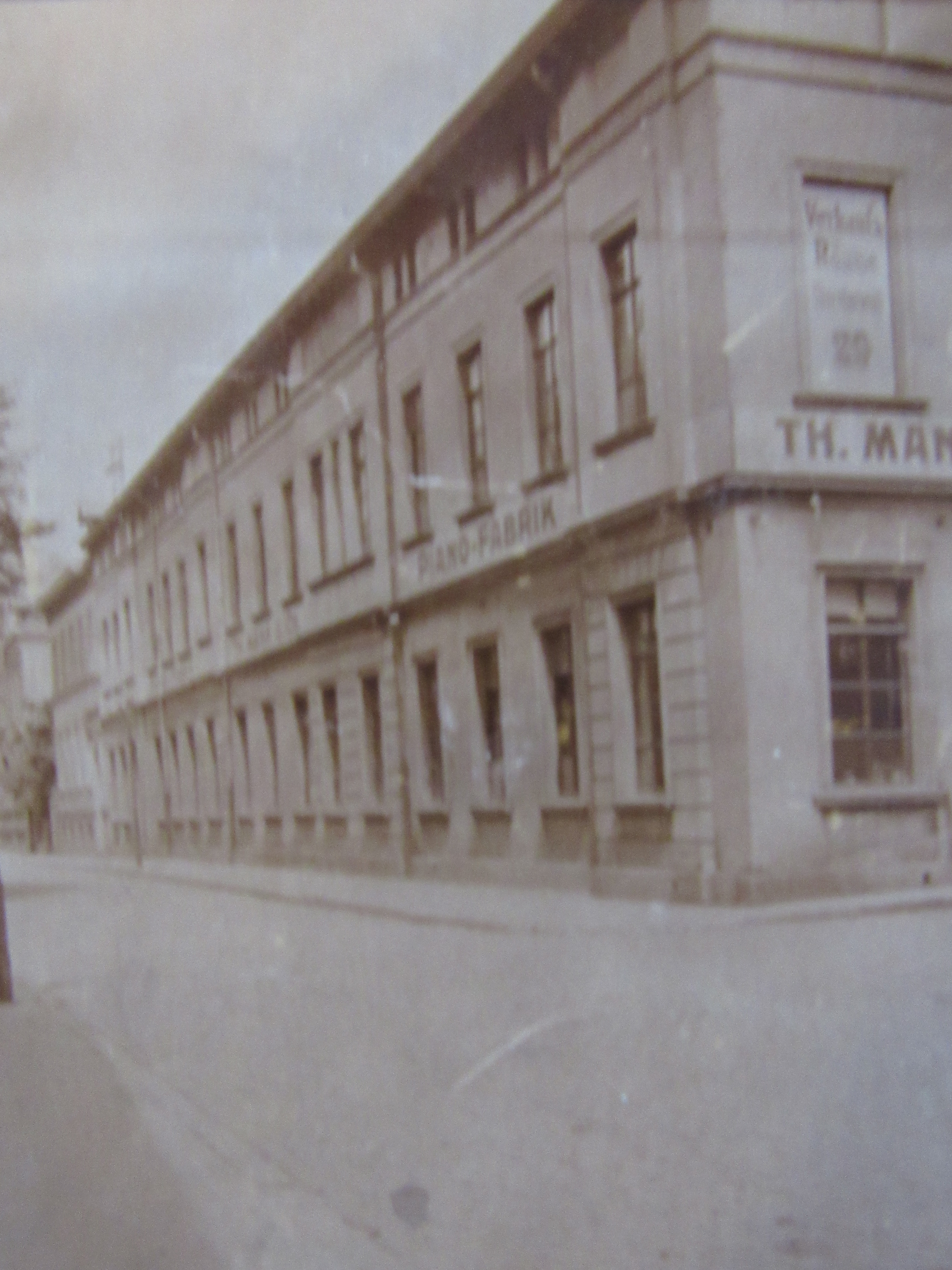
Factory building at Friedenstraße

== Patents, utility models and special designs ==
- 1874: "Peculiar arrangement of pianos and grand pianos."
- 1874, April 10: "Improvement in the construction of Grand Pianos and Pianinos to improve the tuning duration."
- Before Nov. 1884: Mann & Co's Capo d'Astro.
- 1885, March 20, DRP 35688: "Invention of the exposure of the soundboard, whereby the disk lies far away from the bridge in the treble, but the strings are held at the correct distance from the bridge by a narrow string. As a result, an area of the soundboard is freed from the iron plate, which is of great importance for the spread of sound. (...)"
- 1885, July 26, DRP 35690: "Attachment of the strings for pianos and alike"
- Before Sept. 1886: "Pressure bridge (with metal frame and tuning plate cast in one piece)."
- 1892, February 3, DRP 65871: "Soundboard with recessed bridge. With this they want to achieve the same richness of sound for all notes that it forms a natural node line for all tones. (...)"
- 1892, April 7, DRP 66166: Device for collecting and guiding the sound waves in pianinos. System Th. Mann & Co., "Tonwellen-Sammler".
- 1902, March 20, DRP 136860: keyboard for grand pianos and pianinos.
- 1904, March 19, utility model 222497: Wrestplank for grand pianos.

== Instruments in public collections ==
- The foremost piano played by Franz Liszt and made by Volkening in 1840 is located in the Museum of Musical Instruments of the University of Leipzig.
- In the musical instrument collection of the Cincinnati Art Museum is a "Grand Piano" by C.W. Volkening.
- In the inventory of the Museum of Musical Instruments Brussels is a black pianino by Th. Mann & Co., allegedly created around 1900.

== Instrument makers in Bielefeld ==
Other instrument makers in Bielefeld were August Festing, whose workshop existed from 1901 to 1933, and Louis Ext, whose company emerged from the operation of the instrument maker and pianostudio Heinrich Ext (Kreuzstraße 645b) and filed for bankruptcy in April 1887. In his doctoral thesis, Jürgen Oberschelp also mentioned W. Pohlmann and H. Steinhaus. Latter is probably identical to the partner in Th. Mann & Co., Hermann Steinhaus.
