= Ludwig & Co. =

American piano manufacturing company

Coordinates: 40°48′9″N 73°54′45″W

Ludwig & Co., earlier Ludwig Pianos, was a piano manufacturer located at numbers 968–972 of what was then Southern Boulevard (now Willow Avenue), between 135th and 136th Streets, Port Morris, Bronx, New York City at the turn of the 20th century.

== History ==
The company was founded by Melrose native John H. Ludwig in 1889 or 1890 (Pierce, Twomey). Production began in earnest around 1895, and by 1901 the factory in the Bronx was producing up to 3,500 pianos per year.

The turn of the century saw Ludwig pianos garnering critical attention for the first time. At the Paris Exposition of 1900, the Ludwig Piano received a high award, and took the highest honor at the 1901 Pan-American Exposition in Buffalo. They also placed well at the London Crystal Palace Exposition of 1902 (Blue Book). This was a high point in Ludwig's history, and records of these awards were printed in many promotional materials, and even on large decorative decals inside the lids of pianos from this time.

In February 1906, John Ludwig retired from leadership at Ludwig and Company, after not being re-elected to the board of directors (POMIW). In 1911, John Ludwig sued the company over the use of his name in a case that went to the New York Supreme Court in May 1911 (Trade-mark Reporter). In 1933, the brand came under the control of Ricca & Son, and in 1952, the brand was acquired by Louis J. Karzen's Atlas Piano Company of Chicago (Pierce). The Ludwig name was discontinued by Atlas in 1953 (Pierce).

Many of the Ludwig and Co. pianos surviving today are the decorative uprights from 1895–1920, when piano manufacture in New York was at its peak. These pianos were known for their decorative casework and veneered, inlaid designs. In addition to the decorative uprights, Ludwig produced grand pianos and player pianos (often under the name Claviola, with a patented Unit Valve Player Action that is also featured in much of their advertising). Although the value of any older instrument depends largely on its upkeep over the years, many Ludwig pianos have been known to hold up well and still take and hold a tune well even over one hundred years later.
