= Willis & Co. =

Piano manufacturing company

Willis & Co. Limited
- Type: Private company
- Industry: Musical instruments
- Founded: 1884
- Founder: Alexander Parker Willis
- Headquarters: Landshut, Germany
- Area served: Worldwide
- Products: Grand pianos and upright pianos
- Website: willispiano.com

Willis & Co. is a piano manufacturer, formerly founded in 1884 by Alexander Parker Willis and based in Landshut, Bavaria, Germany. A retailer of Willis & Co. in Canada was sold by the Willis family in 1967, and went out of business in 1979. The global branch was merged with the Landshut Willis company in Germany.

== History ==
In 1884, a retailer of Willis & Co. was established in Quebec, Montreal by Alexander Parker Willis.

In 1900, Willis & Co. acquired the major shares of the Lesage & Fils piano factory.

In 1907, Willis & Co. purchased controlling interest in the Lesage Piano Company and the firm started producing “Willis & Company” brand pianos full time.

In 1910, at its peak, Willis & Co. made close to 3000 pianos each year.

In 1967, the Canadian retailer was vended by the Willis family, and the global branch was merged with the Landshut Willis company in Germany.

On August 30, 1976, brand Willis (registered number:DE948592) was approved by German Patent and Trade Mark Office, and lapsed in 1996.

Willis' current trademark entry took place on June 29, 2016, and was registered bei Seiler Pianofortefabrik GmbH, Kitzingen, DE. whose current registered number is DE302016214832.
