= Frederick Beck (piano maker) =

German piano maker

Frederick Beck (fl. 1756 – c. 1798) was a German piano maker who was active in London, England from 1756 through 1798. He also had operations in the city of Paris beginning in 1777. It is likely that numerous craftsman of varying skills worked under Beck due to the variability of the quality and design of instruments produced from his shops in London and Paris. Some of the instruments were of high quality and some contained beautiful designs with elaborate inlays. Others were of poor craftsmanship with inferior key carvings and rushed cabinetry.
