= Walter Piano Company =

American piano-manufacturing company

Walter Piano Company, Inc
- Company type: Private
- Industry: Musical instruments
- Founded: 1969; 57 years ago
- Founder: Charles R. Walter
- Headquarters: Elkhart, Indiana, United States
- Products: Pianos
- Website: walterpiano.com/

Walter Piano Company, Inc. (also known as Charles R. Walter Piano Company) is an American piano-manufacturing company in Elkhart, Indiana. Run by the Walter family, to which many of the workers belong, the company hand-crafts its pianos in an Elkhart factory.

In 1969, Charles Walter, formerly the head of Piano Design and Developmental Engineering at C.G. Conn, bought the Janssen piano name from Conn. He founded a company to make pianos under the Janssen name. In 1975, Walter started his own line of console and studio upright pianos. In 1991, the company ceased to produce pianos under the Janssen brand. In 1997, the company introduced a grand piano under its own brand.

== Piano models ==
As of 2020, the Charles R. Walter line of pianos consists of four models:

=== Grand Piano ===
- W 190 (6' 4")
- W 170 (5' 9")

=== Upright Console Piano ===
- Walter 1520 (43")

=== Upright Studio Piano ===
- Walter 1500 (45")
