= Cavendish Pianos =

UK piano brand

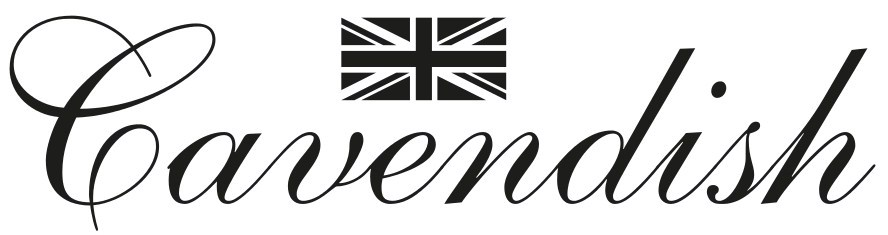
- Company type: Private
- Founded: 2012; 14 years ago
- Headquarters: Bolton Abbey, Yorkshire, UK
- Products: Pianos
- Website: www.cavendishpianos.com

Cavendish Pianos is a brand of pianos made at Yorkshire Pianos, the only company producing pianos still wholly built in the United Kingdom.

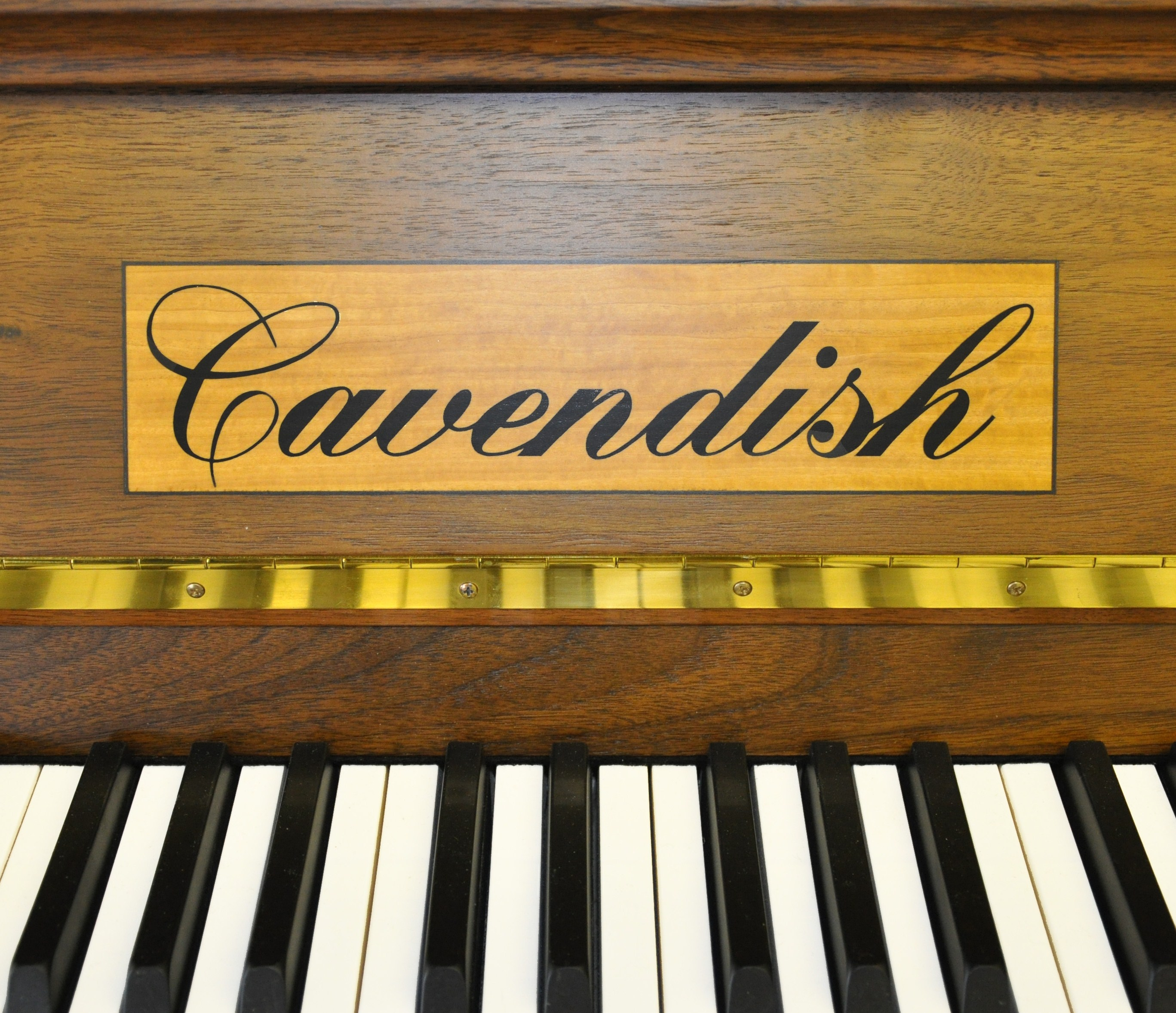
Piano showing inlaid Cavendish logo

== History ==
Inspired by the closure of the Yamaha Kemble factory in Milton Keynes, Adam Cox and his wife Charlie used their experience as piano dealers and repairers together with investment from the Duke and Duchess of Devonshire, to begin production of their own brand of pianos in the United Kingdom. The Cavendish name comes from the Duke of Devonshire, whose support was critical to the foundation of the firm. The Cox family, with three piano-playing daughters, have regularly acted as hosts for players in the Leeds International Piano Competition.

The firm was founded in 2012 after a three-year period of planning and research. The first three Cavendish pianos were shown at the Musikmesse trade fair in Frankfurt in 2012.

In September 2013, Jamie Cullum visited the firm while recording a BBC Radio 4 documentary, Jamie Cullum's Piano Pilgrimage, due for broadcast in January 2014.

== Pianos ==
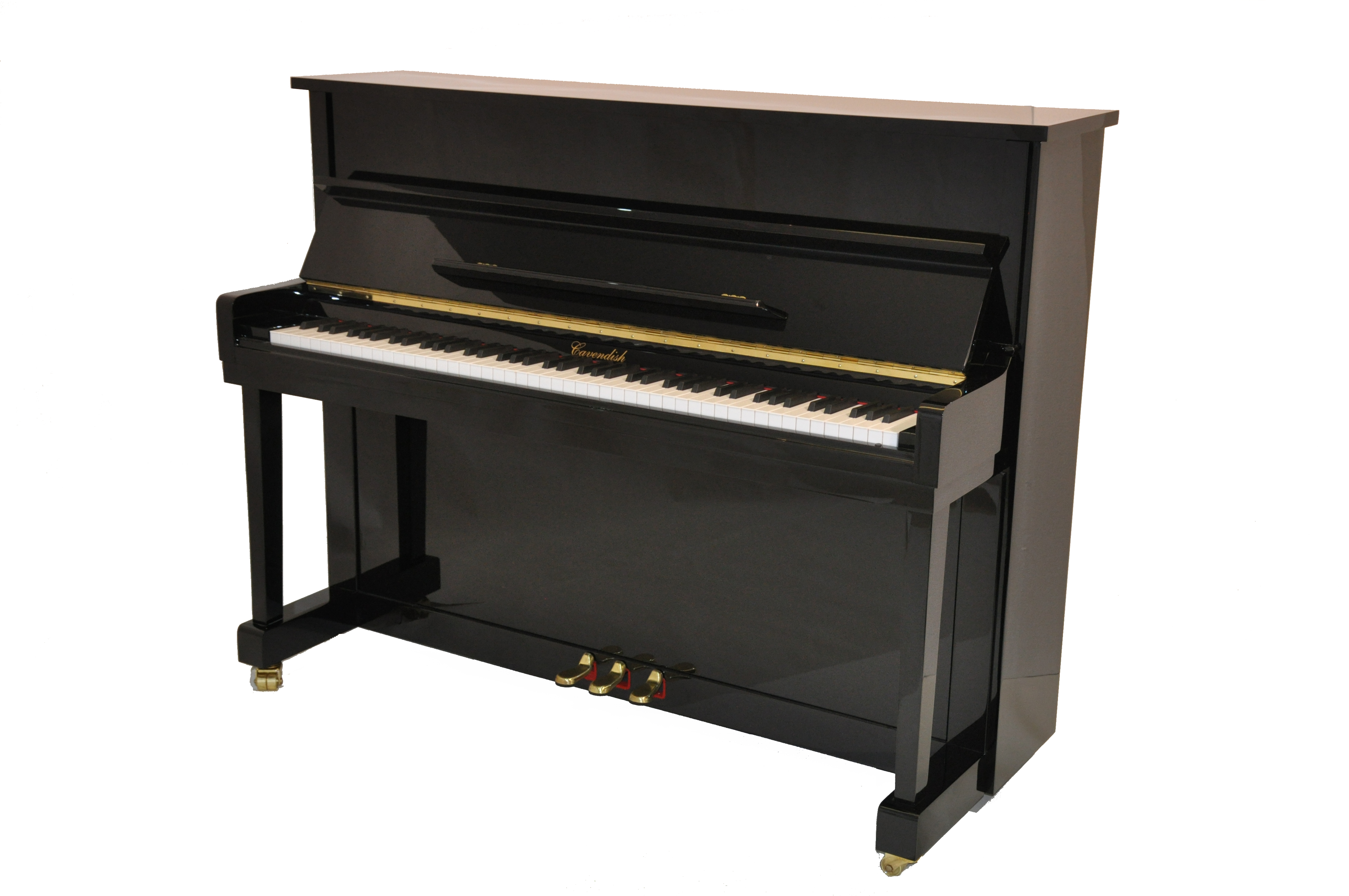
Cavendish Classic model piano

Emmanuel Vass plays Chopin Nocturne on Cavendish Contemporary model piano

Cavendish source their skills and materials from the Yorkshire area. The firm has organised and works with a network of local craftsmen who produce key parts of the pianos, which they call a "craftsman's co-operative". The firm also has links to Lincoln College, which is the last facility in the UK to teach piano technology, and it has provided employment to graduates of the college.

As of 2025, Cavendish produces six models of piano:

=== Grand pianos ===
- Baby Grand: 152 cm
- Boudoir Grand: 186 cm
- Concert Grand

=== Upright pianos ===
- Silverdale
- Wharfedale
- Swaledale

The Times noted in February 2013 that prices of the upright models start at £4,995, which reflects the British manufacture using traditional materials and skills.

Music Instrument Professional has reviewed the Cavendish Classic model which it says is "an affordable, compact piano built around a solid spruce soundboard. A family-focused instrument retailing at under £5,000, the Classic is built in the traditional way, with all wooden action and parts. The Chatsworth 125 was designed in the style of a 1920s British upright. From the cabinet maker build, solid walnut paneled case to the British ash and oak used in the pedal mechanism, this is a fairly unique specimen."

The company produces around 50 instruments per year.

== Awards ==
- 2013 Shortlisted for Best Acoustic Piano at the MIA Music Awards
- 2014 Winner of Best Acoustic Piano award at the MIA Music Awards
