= Sauter Piano Manufaktur =

- Company type: Private
- Industry: Musical instruments
- Founded: 1819; 207 years ago
- Founder: Johann Grimm
- Headquarters: Spaichingen, Germany
- Products: Pianos
- Website: sauter-pianos.de/en

Sauter Pianofortemanufaktur GmbH & Co KG is a German piano manufacturer in Spaichingen, Baden-Württemberg.

Sauter was founded by Johann Grimm in 1819. In 1813 Grimm traveled to Vienna to study piano building with Johann Andreas Streicher and his wife, Nanette Streicher, the noted pianoforte builder. Ludwig van Beethoven is known to have purchased instruments from Nanette Streicher, and she ran the composer's household for many years. Upon completing his apprenticeship with Nanette Streicher, Grimm returned to his hometown of Spaichingen in 1819 and began building virginals. Grimm's successor was his nephew Carl Sauter, who built the workshop into a factory employing a dozen apprentices in 1846, becoming a prominent instrument manufacturer in the region of Swabia. After Carl's early death, his son Johann Sauter took over operation of the company together with his mother. Johann traveled extensively, including to America, researching contemporary instrument construction in advance of the company's transition from manufacturing virginals to building the larger, more complex and expensive pianoforte, the predecessor to the modern piano. Johann Sauter's son, Carl Sauter II, led the company beginning in 1909, and initiated an expansion of the factory in Spaichingen to increase production.

In 1948 Carl Sauter's son, Hans Sauter, took over company operations, and under his leadership the business began worldwide export of its instruments. The final Sauter family member to head the company, Carl Sauter III, brother of Hans Sauter, took over the company in 1968 and constructed a new factory building between 1974 and 1983. After Carl Sauter III's retirement in 1993, Otto Hott acquired a majority share of the company with Ulrich Sauter, of the original Sauter family, remaining in the company as an authorized officer and director of operations.

Today, the annual production of pianos is about 500 units under the Sauter brand. In addition, Sauter supplies many of the parts that are used to manufacture the custom-made Ravenscroft piano by Michael Spreeman. Sauter pianos are made in Germany using only German parts, and are comparable in price and quality to premium piano brands such as Steinway, Bosendorfer, Bechstein, Bluthner, and Steingraeber. Sauter claims the distinction of being the oldest continuously run independent piano manufacturer in Germany.

== Current Grand Piano Models ==
Model	Length	Weight
Concert 275	275 cm	560 kg
Omega 220/Omega Plus	220 cm	385 kg
Delta 185	185 cm	330 kg
Noblesse 185	185 cm	330 kg
Chippendale 185	185 cm	330 kg
Noblesse 160	160 cm	285 kg
Chippendale 160	160 cm	285 kg
Alpha 160	160 cm	285 kg
Queen Anne 160	160 cm	285 kg

== Current Upright Piano Models ==
Model	Height	Weight
Carus 112	112 cm	180 kg
Nova 116	116 cm	180 kg
Vision 116	116 cm	190 kg
School Piano 116	116 cm	190 kg
Ragazza 116	116 cm	200 kg
Cosmo 116	116 cm	205 kg
Vista 122	122 cm	200 kg
School Piano 122	122 cm	210 kg
Ragazza 122	122 cm	220 kg
Competence 130	130 cm	214 kg
Master Class 122	122 cm	220 kg
Master Class 130	130 cm	240 kg
