= Schirmer & Son =

German piano manufacturer

- Company type: Privately held company
- Industry: Musical instruments
- Founded: 1855; 171 years ago
- Founder: Glandt Schirmer
- Headquarters: Rietzer Berg 32, Kloster Lehnin, Germany
- Products: Grand pianos and upright pianos
- Website: schirmerpiano.de

Schirmer & Son is a piano manufacturer in Kloster Lehnin, Germany.

== History ==
The oldest SCHIRMER & SON traces its origins back to 1855 by Glandt Schirmer and his son Teodor Betting. In 1887, Teodor Betting set up his own factory in Kalisz and began manufacturing pianos and reed organs.

In 1997 four vertical piano models and three grands were imported into the United States, upright pianos from 42" console to a 50" upright. The pianos utilize solid spruce soundboards, quarter-sawn beech bridges, 17-ply beech pin blocks, laminated spruce back posts, and Renner action.

== Models ==
=== Grand pianos ===
- M-278
- M-214
- M-186
- M-168
- M-161
- CS-G158

=== Upright pianos ===
- GS-K132
- GS_K126
- GS-K122
- PS-M132
- PS-M125
- PS-M123
- CS-M500
- CS-M400
