= List of piano brand names =

This list of piano brand names includes active and defunct brands. Some names are for "stencil pianos": instruments manufactured by one company for branding and sale by another. Some names have been licensed or sold by the original company to one or more others.

At July 2020, this list had 1174 entries.

== A ==
- Aarhus Pianofabrik
- A.B. Chase
- Ackerman & Lowe
- Ackerman, F.J.
- Acoustgrand
- Acrosonic
- Adam, F.
- Adam, G.
- Adam, M.
- Adams
- Adagio
- Aeolian
- Aerts
- Ajello
- Albert
- Albert & Co.
- Albion
- Albrecht
- Alden
- Aldrich
- Alexander
- Alex Steinbach
- Alfred Rohr, Leipzig
- Allgäuer
- Allison
- Allmendiger
- Alois Kern
- Altenburg, Frederick
- Altenburg, Otto
- American Pianos
- American Music
- Amherst
- Ammer
- Amphion
- American Piano Company (Ampico)
- Amyl
- Anderson
- Anderson Bros.
- Anderson Co.
- Anderson Sons
- Andersson, A.
- Andreas
- André
- Andreys
- Anelli
- Angerhöfer
- Apollo
- Arcade
- Archer
- Arion Pianofabrik
- Arirang
- Armstrong
- Army & Navy
- Arnold
- Artfield
- Artmann
- Asahi
- Ashenback
- Askolin
- Aspelin, O. W.
- Astin-Weight
- Astor
- Atlas
- Auburn
- Aucher
- August Dassel
- August Heide
- August Förster
- Auto Piano Co.

== B ==
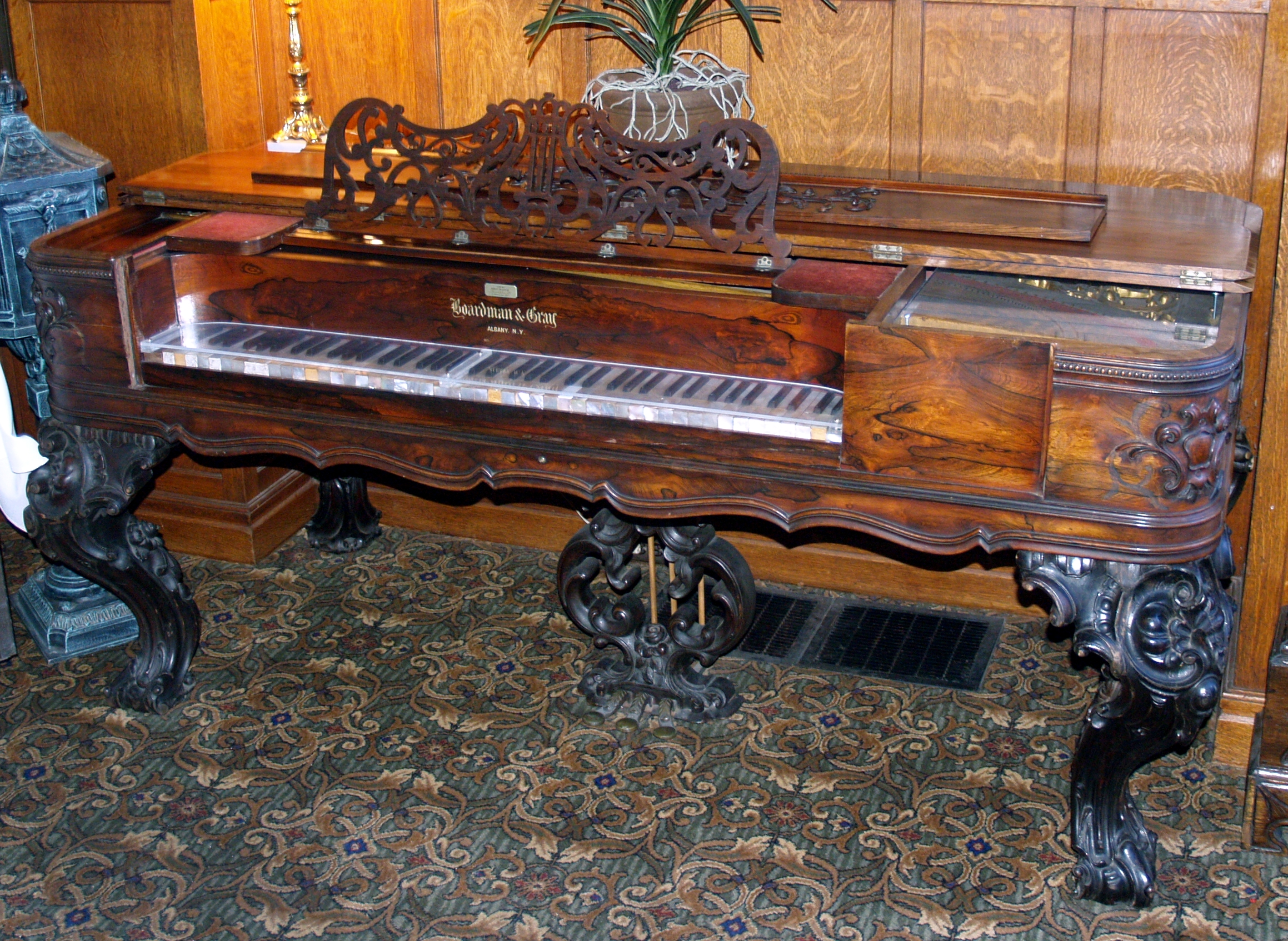
Boardman, Gray & Co. piano at Glen Eyrie.

- Babcock, Alpheus
- Babcock, Lewis & Alpheus
- Babcock, Appleton & Babcock
- Bach
- Bachman
- Bacon, Francis
- Baer, C.
- Bailey
- Baldorr & Sons
- Baldur
- Baldwin
- Baltica
- Bannerman
- Barber London
- Barker & Co
- Barnes
- Barrat & Robinson
- Barthol
- Bartlett
- Bauer
- Bauer, J.
- Baumbach
- Baumeister
- Baumgardt
- Baus
- Bay
- Beale
- Bechner
- Bechstein, C.
- Bechtel
- Becker
- Becker, J.
- Becker Bros.
- Behning & Klix
- Behning & Sons
- Behr Brothers Piano Company
- Bekker
- Belarus
- Belehredek
- Bell Piano & Organ Co.
- Bellak & Sons
- Bellman
- Bellmont
- Benjamin
- Benedict Brothers
- Benkert
- Bennington
- Bensted and sons, H.G.
- Bentley
- Berden
- Berdux
- Beregszaszy
- Berger
- Bergmann
- Bernhard Steiner
- Bernstein Wolf
- Berry
- Betting
- Beulhoff
- Biber
- Beyer-Rahnefeld
- Biddle
- Bieger
- Biese, W.
- Billberg
- Birke, Willy
- Birnbaum
- Bishop
- Bjur Bros.
- Blasius
- Blenheim
- Blondel, A.
- Blondel, G.
- Blüthner
- Boardman, Gray & Co.
- Bocage
- Bock & Hinrichsen
- Bogart
- Bogs & Voigt
- Bohemia
- Boisselot & Fils
- Böhme & Sohn
- Börs, Otto
- Bord, A.
- Borgato, Luigi
- Bösendorfer
- Boston
- Boston Piano Co.
- Boyd
- Brackett & Robinson
- Brackett, J. W.
- Bradbury
- Bradbury, Wm. B.
- Bradford
- Brambach
- Brandtner, H. Rudolf
- Branston
- Brasil
- Brasted
- Breitkopf & Härtel
- Bremitz
- Brentwood
- Bretschneider, Alexander
- Breyer
- Briem
- Briggs
- Brinkerhoff
- Brinkmann
- Brinsmead, John
- Bristol
- Broadway
- Broadwood and Sons
- Broadwood White
- Brodmann
- Brooks
- Brother
- Brown & Allen
- Browning
- Bruckner
- Brunger
- Brunner
- Brødrene Hals Christiania
- Bulow
- Burg van den
- Burgasser
- Burgdorfer
- Burger & Jacobi AG
- Burgmuller
- Burling Mansfield
- Bush & Lane
- Bush & Gerts
- Butler Bros.
- Byelloruss

== C ==
- C. Baer
- Cable, Hobart M.
- Cable Nelson
- Cable Piano Company
- Cäcilia
- Cahn & Cahn
- Calisia
- Cameo
- Cameron
- Camillo
- Cappelen
- Carl. Kierston
- Carlton
- Candice
- Carod
- Cauwenberghe
- Chaika
- Challen
- Casio
- Challenger
- Chappell & Co.
- Charles Stieff
- Chase, A.B.
- Chassaigne
- Chavanne
- Cherny
- Chickering, Jacob
- Chickering, Jonas
- Chickering & Mackays
- Chickering and Sons
- Chickering Bros.
- Chicago Cottage
- Christensen
- Christman
- Chu-Seng
- Clark Melville
- Classenti
- Classic
- Clement
- Clementi
- Christofori
- Chollard
- Chollard & Chollard
- Cline
- Cockuijt
- Collard & Collard
- Colby
- Colonial
- Cotto
- Conn
- Conover
- Conover Cable
- Consolat de Mar
- Continental
- Conway
- Cornish
- Cramer
- Crane & Sons, Ltd.
- Cristofori
- Crown
- Cuijpers, J.F.
- Cunningham Piano Company
- Currier & Gilbert
- Currier & Co.
- Currier Piano Co.
- Czapka & Sohn

== D ==
- Daesung
- Daewoo
- Dale Forty
- Dalibor
- David à paris
- D'almaine
- Danemann
- Danemann, W
- Daniël
- Davenport & Treacy
- Debain et Cie
- De Blaise
- Delmar
- Dassel
- Decker Brothers
- Dengler
- D'este
- Diapason
- Dietmann
- Diederichs Freres
- Disklavier
- Dittrich
- Dobbert
- Does, van der
- Döhnert
- Doina
- Donath, Max
- Dörner
- Dörneberg
- Carl Dörr
- Doss, Robert
- Dominion Piano and Organ Co.
- Dochtermann piano
- Doutreligne Piano
- Drachman
- Dreinhöfer, Wilhelm
- Dreyer & Co.
- Driggs, Parmelee & Co.
- Driggs Patent Piano Co.
- Driggs & Tooker
- Duck-Son & Pinker
- Dulcette
- Dunham, John B.
- Dunham, John B. & Co.
- Dunham & Sons
- Duysen
- D.W. Karn
- Dresden

== E ==
- Eastman
- Eavestaff
- Ebel & Sohn
- Ebel, Carl
- Ecke, Carl
- Eckstein
- Ed. Westermayer
- Egtved
- Friedrich Ehrbar
- Eisenberg
- Ekström, Olof Berndt
- Elcké
- Elias
- Ellington
- Elysian
- Emerson
- Emmer, Wilhelm
- Erard & Cie, S.& P.
- Erard- London
- Erbe, J.
- Ernst Jacob, Mechanik Fabrik Berlin CO
- Erste Produktiv-Genossenschaft
- Ernst Chladni
- Essenfelder
- Essex
- Estey Piano Corp.
- Estonia
- Eterna
- Etyde
- Eungblut, Rogers
- Euphona
- Europa
- Euterpe
- Evans
- Everett
- Evertides

== F ==
- F.Dörner & sohn
- Fabbrini
- F.Bach
- F.Rosener
- Albert Fahr
- Falcone
- Fandrich Piano
- Fandrich & Sons
- Farfisa
- Farrand
- Fayette S. Cable
- Fazer Musik
- Fazioli
- Feigl, Alois
- Fenner
- Feurich
- Fibich
- Fibiger
- Fiedler, Gustav
- Finger
- Fiona
- Fischer, Carl
- J&C Fischer
- Focké
- Focké, Georges
- Forenede
- Forrest
- Foster
- Förster & Co.
- Förster, August
- Francke
- French
- French Starck
- Franz Wolek in Wien
- Fritz Dobbert
- Fuchs
- Fuchs & Möhr
- Fuder, G.

== G ==
- G. Ekström & Co. Pianofabrik
- Gabler
- Gaveau
- Gebr. Perzina
- Gebruder Stingl
- Geissler, F.
- George Steck
- Gerard
- Gerhard Adam Wesel
- Gerbstädt
- Gerhard Adams
- Gerhard Heintzman
- Gerstenberger
- Gevaert
- Geyer
- Gilbert Hoffman
- Giles Pianos Ltd.
- Gillot-Straube
- Glos & Pflug, Wien
- Glass & Co.
- Glenz (Josef) Breslau
- Godfrey
- Goetze & Co.
- Goetze-Gross
- Gordon & Bailey
- Gordon Laughead
- Gourlay
- R. Görs & Kallmann
- Görs & Spangenberg
- Gotha
- Gotzmann
- Graf, Conrad
- Graf, Hermann
- Graham & Co London
- Grand
- Grande
- Gratiae
- Grau, F.
- Grimm
- Grinnell Bros.
- Grotrian-Steinweg
- Grover
- Grunert
- Gulbransen
- Gunther, J.
- Gunther & Sohne
- Gustafson & Ljungqvist

== H ==
- Haake, Karl
- Haddorff
- Hadley
- Haegele of Aalen
- Haessler
- Hagspiel
- Hahn, Alb.
- Hain, Stephan
- Haines Bros.
- Haileer
- Hailun
- Halle &
- Hallet, Davis & Co.
- Hallett & Cumston
- Hallett, Russell
- Hals
- Hamburger
- Hamilton
- Hammond
- Hampton
- Hanlet
- Hannon Hall
- Hansen, A.
- Hansen, Julius
- Hillmann
- Hansmann, Gebr.
- Hardman
- Harimatis
- Harmsworth & Company
- Harold, F.E.
- Harrison, V. F.
- Harrodser
- Hartge, Henry
- Hartmann, W.
- Harvard
- Harwood
- Hasche
- Hasselaar
- Hasseldieck, Dietrich
- Hasti Asghari
- Hauch, J.B.
- Hausmann
- Hautrive
- Hayelson
- Hayes, E. T.
- Hayt, Babcock & Appleton
- Hayts, Babcock & Appleton
- Hazelton & Brother
- Hazelton Brothers
- Healy
- Hedke, Wilh.
- Hegeler
- Heiden, Carl von
- Heinisch
- Heintzman & Co.
- Heitzmann & Sohn
- Heller
- Hellas
- Hellström
- Helmholz
- Heppel & Theilig
- Hergens, A. G.
- Hermann
- Herrburger
- Herrmann, Alexander
- Herz, Henri
- Herz Neveu, Philippe
- Heyl, Gustav
- Hijz, Ernest
- Hillgärtner, Heinrich
- Hilton
- Hindsberg
- Hinze
- Hlucháň
- Hobart M. Cable
- Hoek
- Hoepfner
- Hoerr, Franz
- Hofbauer, Gustav
- Hoffmann, August
- Hoffmann, Georg
- Hoffmann, W.
- Hoffmann & Kühne
- Hofmann
- Hofmann & Czerny
- Hofmann, Karl
- Hofmann & Scholz
- Hofmann & Schulze
- Hohner
- Hölling & Spangenberg
- Holzl & Heitzmann
- Hoff & Co.
- Hopkinson
- Hornung & Møller
- Hörügel
- Howard
- Howard Piano Co.
- HsingHai
- Hummel
- Hundt & Sohn
- Hupfeld
- Hupfer Pianos
- Humphrey, London
- Huntington
- Hyfte, van C.
- Hyundai

== I ==
- Ibach, Rud.
- Irmler, J.G.

== J ==
- J. Erbe Eisenach
- J. G. Irmler
- Jacob Bros.
- Jahn
- James & Holmstrom
- Janowsky, M.
- Janssen
- Jarret & Goudge
- Jasper
- Jaschinsky, A.
- Jefferson
- Jehle
- Jelmini
- Jewett, Boston
- John Raper co.
- Jong de
- Jørgensen, Brødr.
- J. Tresselt
- Julius Bach MFG
- Jurkat, C.
- Jayel

== K ==
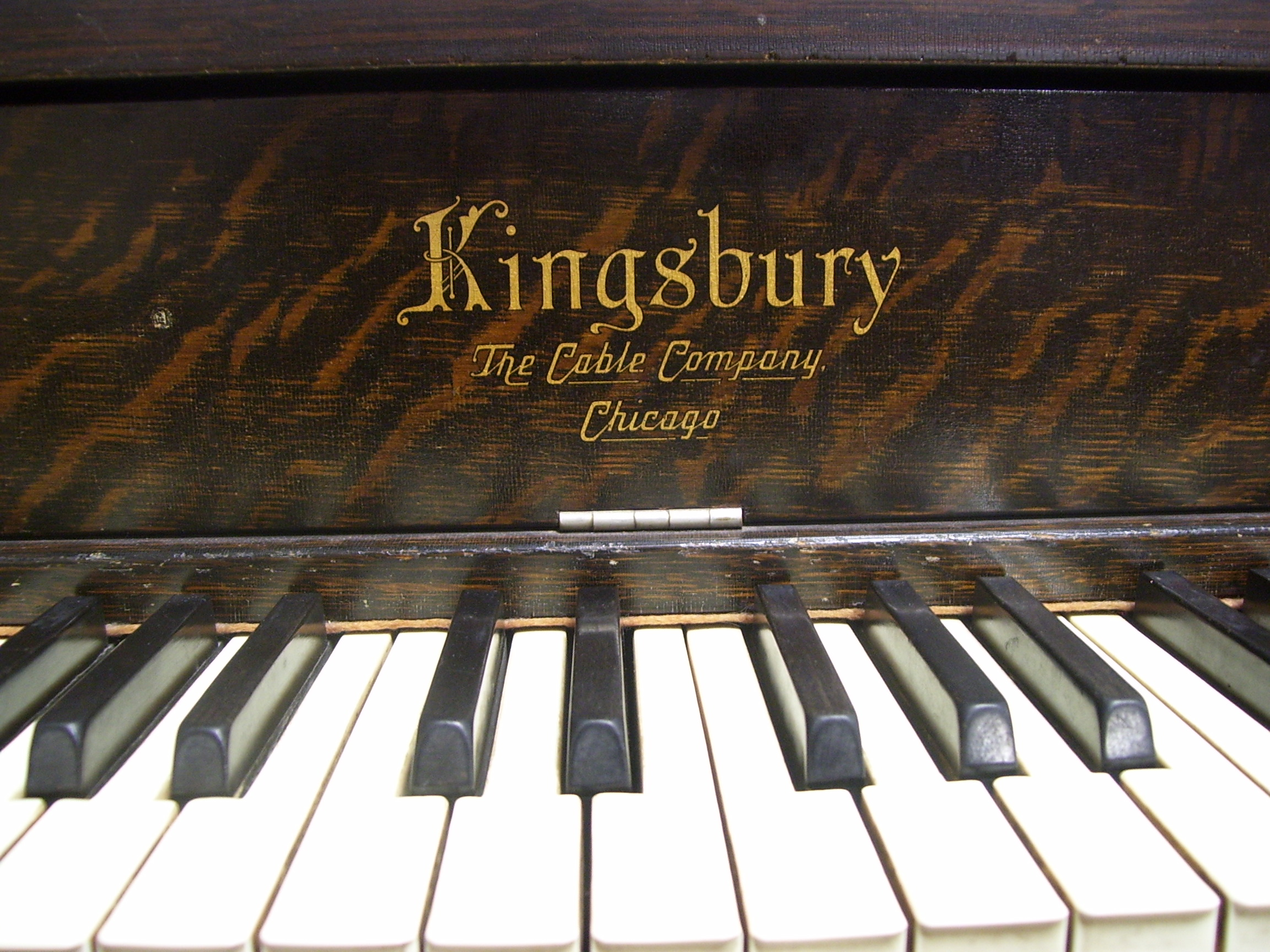
A Kingsbury piano, made by the Cable Piano Company.

- Kadette
- Kadenza
- Kaim
- Kaim & Gunther
- Kaiser
- Kann, Georg
- Kappler
- Kaps, Ernst
- Kasselman
- Katzmarek & Co.
- Kawai Musical Instruments
- Keilberg
- Keislair
- Kemble
- Kenny & Sons
- Kent & Cooper
- Kessels
- Kester, Ludwig
- Keylard
- Kieselhorst
- Kilbourne
- Kimball
- Kingsburg
- Kingsbury
- Kirkman
- Kirschner
- Kisting
- Klavins
- Klein
- Klima
- Klingmann
- Kloppe, H.
- Knabe & Gaehle
- Knabe, Gaehle & Co.
- Knabe, Wm. & Co.
- Knabe Bros.
- Knake
- Knauer
- Knauss
- Knight
- Knöchel Ad.
- Knudsen, J.
- Knudsen & Sons
- Koch & Korselt
- Koch & Co.
- H. Kohl
- Kohler & Campbell
- Kort de
- Kraft, Aug.
- Krakauer Brothers
- Kramer
- Kranich & Bach
- Krasnii Oktyabr' (Leningrad)
- Krause, Max
- Krauss
- Krell & French
- Krell
- Kreuizbach
- Kreutzbach, Julius
- Kreutzer
- Kriebel
- Kriegelstein
- Kriegelstein & Arnaud
- Kriegelstein & Plantade
- Krumm
- Kuhla
- Kuhse, Johann
- Kunst
- Kunz
- Kupers
- K.Fenner
- Kurtzmann & Sons

== L ==
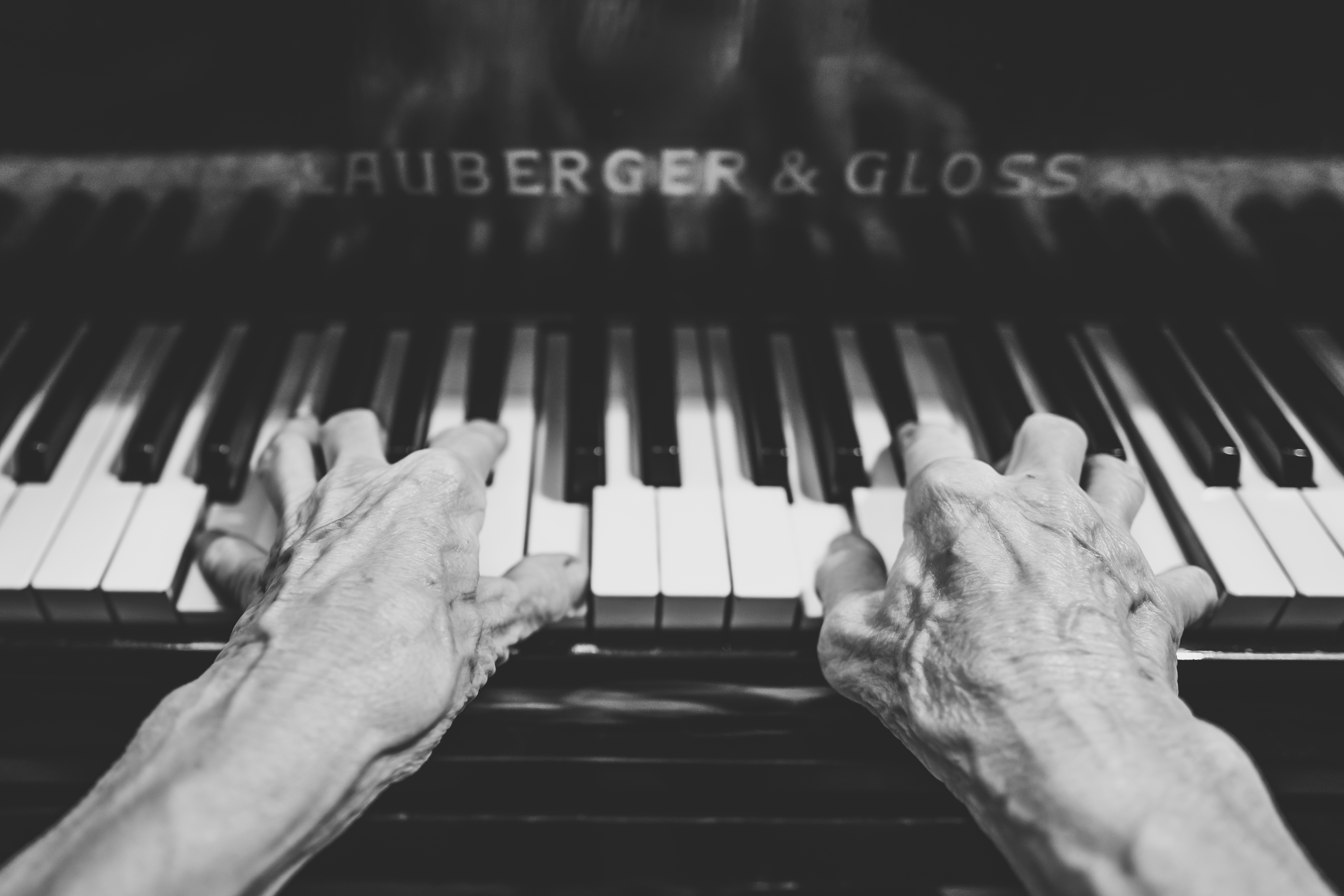
Lauberger & Gloss

- La Petite
- Labrousse
- Lager
- Lagonda
- Lagrima
- Lakeside
- Lambert
- Lancaster
- Lauberger & Gloss
- Laughead, Gordon
- Laurence & Nash
- Laurence & Sons, Alex
- Legnica
- Leguerinais
- Lehman
- Lehmann, Adolf
- Lehmann de Lehnsfeld
- Leichel
- Leijser
- Leipzig
- Lerpée, Carl
- Lesage
- Leschen, Wilhelm
- Lester
- Leswein
- Leutke
- Lichtental
- Liederstrom
- Liehr
- Lieshout & Zonen, M. van
- Lichtenthal, Hermann
- Lighte, F. C.
- Lighte & Bradburys
- Lighte & Ernst
- Lighte & Newton
- Lighte, Newton & Bradburys
- Liljequist, Matthias
- Lincoln
- Lindbergh
- Lindeman, Wm.
- Lindeman & Sons
- Linden
- Lindholm
- Lindner
- Lindner & Sohn, I.P.
- Lindsay
- Linke
- Lipczinsky, Max
- Lipp
- Lippmann
- Lirika
- Littmann
- Livingstone
- Lohmann Piano Co.
- Lorenz
- Love, Malcolm
- Lowrey
- Ludwig
- Luis Verdugo & Hijo
- Lummer, Wilh.
- Luner
- Lyon & Healy
- Lyra
- Lyrica

== M ==
- Maeari-Hyundai
- Maetzke
- Mag
- Mage
- Magrini
- Mahler
- Maier, K.
- Malmsjö
- Mand
- Mann, Theodor
- Manner & Co.
- Manner & Gabler
- Mannhorg
- Mansfield
- Manthey
- Mari
- Marion
- Maristany
- Martins & Ouvrier
- Markx
- Marschall & Mittauer
- Marshall & Rose
- Marshall & Wendell
- Mason & Hamlin
- Mason & Risch
- Mathuschek, F.
- Mathushek Piano Mfg. Co.
- Mathushek & Kinkeldey
- Mathushek & Kühner
- Mathushek & Son
- Matthaes
- Matz & Co.
- Mätzke, Ed.
- Max Horn Zwickau
- May
- McPhail, A. M.
- Mecklenburg
- Meister
- Meldorf
- Melford
- Melodic
- Melville Clark
- Menzel
- Mercedes
- Merkur
- Mes, A.
- Metropolitan
- Meyer, Conrad
- Meyer, Herman
- Michelle
- Mignon
- Mikula, Gebr.
- Miller, Henry F. Miller (Boston)
- Milton, (John)
- Minse
- Monington & Weston
- Moore & Moore
- Morel
- Morley, Robert
- Morrison Music Company
- Morrison & Harrison
- Mörs
- Mozart piano company
- Müller
- Müller-Schiedmayer
- Mussard
- Muzelle
- Mühlbach, F.

== N ==
- Nagel
- Nakamichi
- Natori
- Nehammer
- Nelson
- Neuburger, Adolf
- Neugebauer
- Neumann
- Neumeyer, Gebr.
- Neupert
- New Winsor
- Niederländer
- Niedermeyer
- Nieër
- Niemeyer
- Niendorf
- Nijmatten
- Nocturno
- Noeske
- Nordiska
- Nord Piano
- Normandie (NY)
- Nützmann, Adolf

== O ==
- Offberg
- Otto Bach
- Otto Meister
- Omori
- Oktava

== P ==
- Packard
- Painter & Ewing
- Palatino
- Paling minor
- Pallik & Schicker
- Pallik & Stiasny
- Pape, Jean-Henri
- Pape fils (Frédéric-Eugène)
- Pappenberger
- Papps
- Parttart, Alois
- Paukert
- Paul Werner (Dresden)
- Pawlek, Josef
- Pearl River
- Peek and Son
- Pepper
- Period Piano Company
- Perzina, Gebr.
- Peterborgh
- Petrof
- Petrov
- Petzold
- Peukert
- Pfaffe, Julius
- Pfeiffer
- Pfeiffer, J.
- Philipps
- Phillip
- Phillips
- Piano Disc
- Pianova
- Picassi
- Pleyel
- Plymouth
- Poestkoke
- Pohlmann, Leonhard
- Pokorny
- Poletti & Tuinman
- Pons Gary
- Poole
- Pramberger
- Prein, Friedrich
- President
- Prestel
- Price & Teeple
- Probst, Georg
- Produktiv-G., E.
- Proksch, A.
- Proskowec
- Protze
- Psalmist
- Purcell

== Q ==
- Quandt
- Quispel

== R ==
- Rachals
- Raehse-Repia
- Rameau
- Ramsberger
- Rathke, R.
- Rahmann
- Raudenbush & Sons
- Rauzer
- Ravenstein
- Ravenscroft
- Red October
- Regent
- Reichelt & Birnbaum
- Reid Sohn
- Reingardt, V. K.
- Reinhard
- Reinhold
- Reino Ikonen
- Reisbach
- Rekewitz, Wilh.
- Renn
- Repia
- Rhiendorf
- Richard Lipp & Sohn
- Richmann
- Ridgewood
- Rieger-Kloss
- Riese
- Riga
- Rijken
- Rijken & de Lange
- Rippen
- Ritmüller
- W. Ritmüller & Sohn
- Ritter
- Robinson
- Rogers
- Rogers, George
- Rohlfing
- Rohr, Alfred
- Roland
- Roller & Blanchet
- Roloff, H
- Römhildt
- Ronaldi
- Karl Rönisch
- Rordorf
- Rösch-Le Sage
- Rosenbach
- Rosenberg
- Rosenkranz
- Rösler
- G. Rösler
- Roth & Junius
- Roth Pianos
- Royale
- Royale-Classic
- Rubenstein
- Ruch
- Rud. Ibach Sohn
- Russell and Russell
- Russell, George
- Ruyter
- R. Vogel
- Robinson

== S ==
- Sabel
- Sagenhaft
- Sakura
- Samaniego
- Sames, William
- Samick
- Sandbergen
- Sängler & Sohne
- Sassmann
- Saturn
- Sauter
- Schaaf & Co.
- Schaaf, Hermann
- Schadhauser, Johann
- Schafer & Sons
- Schanz
- Scharf & Hauk
- Scheel, Carl
- Schellenkens, G.
- Schell, Lothar
- Schemelli & Co.
- Schiedmayer, J.& P.
- Schiedmayer
- Schiller
- Schilling, Fr.
- Schimmel
- Schindhelm
- Schindler
- Schirmer & Son
- Schlögl
- Schmidt
- Schmidt-Flohr
- Schmidt Pianos
- Schmitz
- Schnell, R.A.
- Scholze
- Schramm & Sons
- Schröder, C.M.
- Schroeder
- Schröther
- Schruder
- Schubert
- Schuerman
- Schultz & Sons
- Schulze & Sohn
- Schulze & Pollmann
- Schumann
- Schuppe & Neumann
- Schütz & Co.
- Schütze
- Schuetze & Ludolff
- Schwechten, G.
- Schweighofer
- Schweizerstein
- Schwester
- Seeger
- Seidel, Rob
- Seidel & Sohn
- Seiler, Ed.
- Seiler, Max
- Sejung Piano Co.
- Settergren
- Settergren Piano Co.
- Seuffert
- Sherlock - Manning
- Sherman, Clay
- Shima-Jehle
- Shimler
- Shigeru
- Shigeru Kawai
- Shoninger
- Shorewood
- Siegel, Rudolf
- Siewert
- Silbermann
- Singer
- Skop
- Silvia
- Smart, Charles
- Smidt & Wegener
- Snel
- Sohmer & Co.
- Sojin
- Solton
- Sommerfeld
- Sonor
- Sonore
- Soph, Joseph
- Sopnnagel
- Soward
- Spencer
- Spencer & Murdoch
- Squire
- Squire and Longson
- Standaart
- Stapel
- Starck
- Starckette & Kenmore
- Starr Piano Co.
- Staub & Co.
- Staub, J.
- Steck
- Steck, George
- Steger & Sons
- Steigerman
- Stein
- Steinbach
- Steinbach, Alex
- Steinberg
- Steinberg, Gerh.
- Steinberg, Wilh
- Steiner, B.
- Steiner, Bernhard
- Steingraeber & Söhne
- Steinhoven
- Steinmann, Wilh.
- Steinmayer
- Steinthal, L.
- Steinway & Sons
- Steinway Haus
- Stelzhammer
- Stenger
- Sterling
- Stichel, F.
- Stingl, Gebr.
- Stingl, Ignaz
- Stöcker, Theodor
- Stockholm
- Stoddart
- Story & Clark
- Straube
- Strauss
- Streicher
- Strindberg
- Strohmenger & Sons
- Strothier
- Stroud
- Stuart and Sons
- Stuyvesant
- Stultz
- Sturn
- Suzuki
- Svahnquist
- Svenska

== T ==
- Tallone
- Tamta
- Taubert
- Tchaikovsky
- Temple
- Tetsch & May
- Thalèn
- Thayer
- Theilig, Rich.
- Thein
- Therson
- Th. Mann & Co.
- Thomas & Avarsea
- Thuringer
- Tischner, J. A.
- Thürmer, Ferd.
- Tokai
- Tokiwa
- Tokkata
- Tolkien
- tonk
- Tormin, C.
- Toyo
- Toyo Apollo
- Trautwein
- Trübger, Emil
- Tschaika
- Tuch & Geyer

== U ==
- Uebel & Lechleiter
- Ühlmann
- Ukraina
- United Piano Makers, New York
- Urbas, Johann
- Urbas & Kuhne
- Urbas & Reishauer
- Urk & Sons

== V ==
- Van Hyfte
- Van der Does
- Van Lieshout
- Van Veen J.
- Van Veen W.
- Verkooij
- Vermy
- Vertigrand
- Victor W.H Paling & Co
- Vijgeboom Joh.
- Vijgeboom Johs.
- Van Vloten
- Vose & Sons
- Vogel & Co.
- Vogel, Robert
- Vogel & Sohn
- Vogeler & Co.
- Voigt, Adolf Ernst
- Volkening
- Vollmer
- Vough

== W ==
- Waddington
- Wagner
- Wagener & Co, Berlin
- Waldhäusl, Robert
- Waldstein
- Wallace Ash
- Waldeck
- Wallace Pianoforte Co.
- Walsmann M.
- Walter, Charles R.
- Waltham Piano Co.
- Warfield
- Wasniczek
- Waters, Horace
- Watlen, John
- Weaver
- Weber
- Webster
- Wegman
- Weidenslaufer
- Weidig, C.
- Weihenmeyer & Co.
- Weinbach
- Weinstein and Sons
- Weiss
- Weissbrod
- Wellington
- Welmar U.K.
- Welzel P.F.
- Wendl & Lung
- Werch, Lothar
- Werner, F.W.
- Werner, Hans
- Wertheim
- Westbrook
- Westerlund
- Wetzel
- Whelpdale
- Whitmore
- Whitney
- Whittaker
- Wieck
- Wieler
- Wilh Steinberg
- Wilhelm Spaethe
- Wilkinson, George
- Wilkinson & Wornum
- William Wallace Kimball
- Williams & Son, R.S.
- Williams Piano Co.
- Williamson
- Willermann
- Willis & Co.
- Wilson
- Winchester
- Windhofer, Rudolf
- Windover
- Windsor
- Winkelmann & Co.
- Winkler, Paul
- Winter && Co.
- Wirth, Johann
- Wittmayer
- Witton and Witton
- Wohlfahrt
- Wolfframm
- Wolkenhauer
- Woodchester
- Wornum, Robert
- Wornum, Robt. & Sons
- Wurlitzer
- W. P. Emerson Piano Co.
- W.Naessens
- Wyman

== X ==
- Xinghai Beijing Piano Co.

== Y ==
- Yamaha
- Young Chang
- Yangtze River

== Z ==
- Zahl, Georg
- Zeitter & Winkelmann
- Zender, Sydney
- Zimmermann
- Zwang
- Zwicki

• Zapka

== See also ==
- List of piano manufacturers
- Innovations in the piano
- Pedal piano
- Piano acoustics
- Piano key frequencies (in equal temperament)
- Piano roll
- Piano tuning
- Player piano
- Prepared piano
- Social history of the piano
- String piano
- Tangent piano

== Bibliography ==
- Larry Fine; The Piano Book: Buying & Owning a New or Used Piano (Annual Supplement to the Piano Book); Brookside Press; 2005; ISBN 1-929145-17-9
