= Belarus (disambiguation) =

Belarus is a country in Eastern Europe.

Belarus may also refer to:

- Belarus (tractor), a brand of tractors produced at the Minsk Tractor Works
- Biełarus, a Belarusian newspaper published in the US
- Belarus (pianos), a Belarusian piano manufacturer

== See also ==
- Radio Belarus, the official international broadcasting station of Belarus
- Byelorussia (disambiguation)
- Republic of Belarus (disambiguation)
- White Ruthenia, an archaism for the eastern Belarus
