= John Hazelton =

John Hazelton may refer to:

- John W. Hazelton (1814–1878), American politician
- John Hazelton (piano maker), 19th century piano maker from New York City
