= Lechleiter =

Lechleiter is a surname. Notable people with the surname include:

- Jakob Lechleiter (1911–1994), Swiss politician
- John C. Lechleiter (born 1952), American businessman and chemist
- Paul Lechleiter, partner in German pianomaker Uebel & Lechleiter
- Robert Lechleiter (born 1980), German footballer
