= Republic of Belarus (disambiguation) =

The Republic of Belarus is a landlocked country in Eastern Europe.

The Republic of Belarus may also refer to:

- Republic of Belarus (1991–1994)
- Rada of the Belarusian Democratic Republic (government-in-exile, from 1919)
- Belarusian State (1920)
- Belarusian Democratic Republic (1918–1919)

== See also ==
- Belarus (disambiguation)
- Byelorussia
