= Byelorussia =

Byelorussia may refer to:

- Historical (Soviet) name for Belarus, a country in Eastern Europe
- Socialist Soviet Republic of Byelorussia or Soviet Socialist Republic of Belarus, an early client state of Soviet Russia in the historical territory of Belarus
- Socialist Soviet Republic of Lithuania and Byelorussia or Socialist Soviet Republic of Lithuania and Belarus
- Byelorussian Soviet Socialist Republic, a nominally independent state in 1920–1922 and constituent republic of the Soviet Union from 1922 to 1991
- 2170 Byelorussia, a main-belt asteroid

== See also ==
- Belarus (disambiguation)
- Republic of Belarus (disambiguation)
