= Larry Fine (piano technician) =

American piano technician

Larry Fine (born 1950) is an American piano technician, consultant, and author. He is best known for writing The Piano Book.

The Piano Book, as of 2001 in its fourth edition, describes how pianos work, discusses and reviews piano brands, tracks changes in the piano industry, describes the retail piano industry in the United States with advice on buying from piano stores. It also documents innovations in piano building. The book is written from the viewpoint of the piano technician. The book was accompanied by an annual supplement, which offered updates between major revisions. As of fall 2009, Fine replaced the annual supplements with a new, semi-annual publication Acoustic & Digital Piano Buyer.

== Books ==
- The Piano Book (4th edition 2001; Jamaica Plain, MA: Brookside Press; ISBN 1-929145-01-2).
- 2007–2008 Annual Supplement to The Piano Book (2007; Jamaica Plain, MA: Brookside Press; ISBN 1-929145-21-7).
- Spring 2009 Acoustic & Digital Piano Buyer (2009; Jamaica Plain, MA: Brookside Press; ISBN 978-1-929145-25-6).
