= Carl Dörr =

Carl Dörr was a piano manufacturer in Wieden, Vienna, Austria.

== History ==
It was founded by Daniel Dörr (1788–1837) in 1817 in Vienna. His son Wilhelm Dörr I took the business over afterwards. Carl Dörr (1856–1934) succeeded as head of the company in 1882. For the excellence of the products he received a medal at the Weltausstellung 1873 Wien. He was awarded an imperial and royal warrant of appointment to the Emperor and King of Austria-Hungary.
