= P. A. Starck Piano =

Piano manufacturer active 1891-1965 in Chicago

- Industry: Piano maker
- Founded: 1891; 135 years ago
- Founder: P.A. Starck
- Defunct: 1965
- Headquarters: Chicago, Illinois, United States
- Products: Pianos

P. A. Starck Piano was a piano company headquartered in Chicago, Illinois, United States. It was founded in 1891 and closed in 1965. It was said that its "bent acoustic rim ... [gave] the Starck upright the tone of a grand piano and [made] it especially well adapted for concert use".
