= Ed. Westermayer =

German piano manufacturer

- Company type: Privately held company
- Industry: Musical instruments
- Founded: 1863
- Founder: Eduard Westermayer
- Headquarters: Berlin, Germany
- Area served: Worldwide
- Key people: Paul Westermayer (Successor)
- Products: Pianos

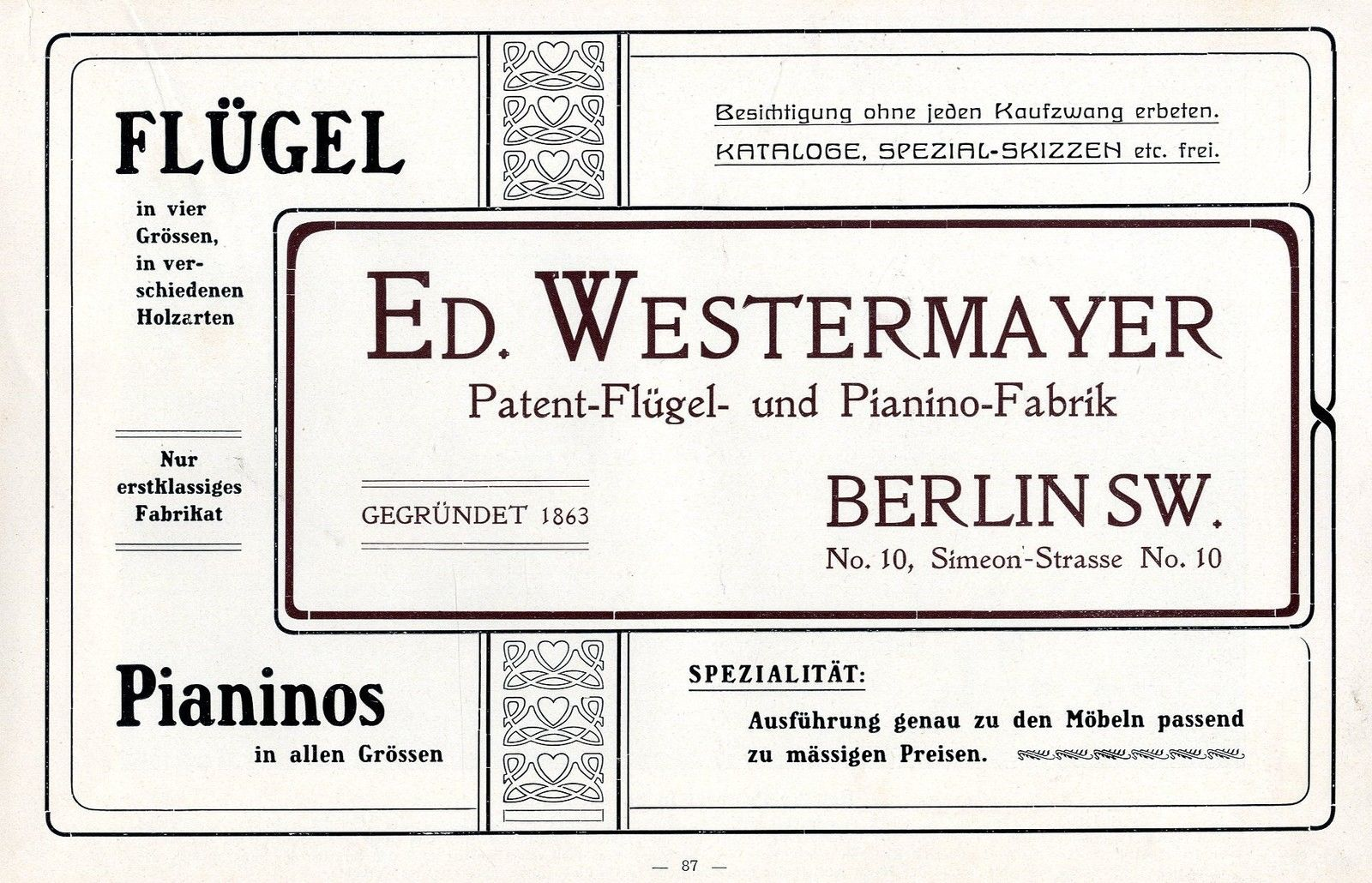
Advertisement of Ed. Westermayer (1910)

Ed. Westermayer was a piano manufacturer in Berlin, Germany.

Eduard Westermayer founded his piano company in Berlin in 1863 after learning the musical instrument maker trade and spending several years as a journeyman, working and studying the craft in various countries in Europe and also in the United States. The company was located at Simeonstraße 10.

Initially Westermayer focused on exporting his instruments to South America, but soon found buyers in Germany, Russia, Scandinavia, the United States and even Hawaii in the 1880s and 1890s. Westermayer piano designs were advanced for their time. Ed. Westermayer was granted several patents in Germany, Britain and the US for the actions (mechanisms) he invented to give better repetition and control for the player.

Ed. Westermayer died in 1892. His nephew and successor Paul Westermayer was awarded an imperial and royal warrant of appointment to the court of Austria-Hungary.

== Bibliography ==
- Henkel, Hubert (2000). Lexikon Deutscher Klavierbauer (in German). Frankfurt am Main, Germany: Verlag Erwin Bochinsky. p. 702. ISBN 3-923639-37-6.

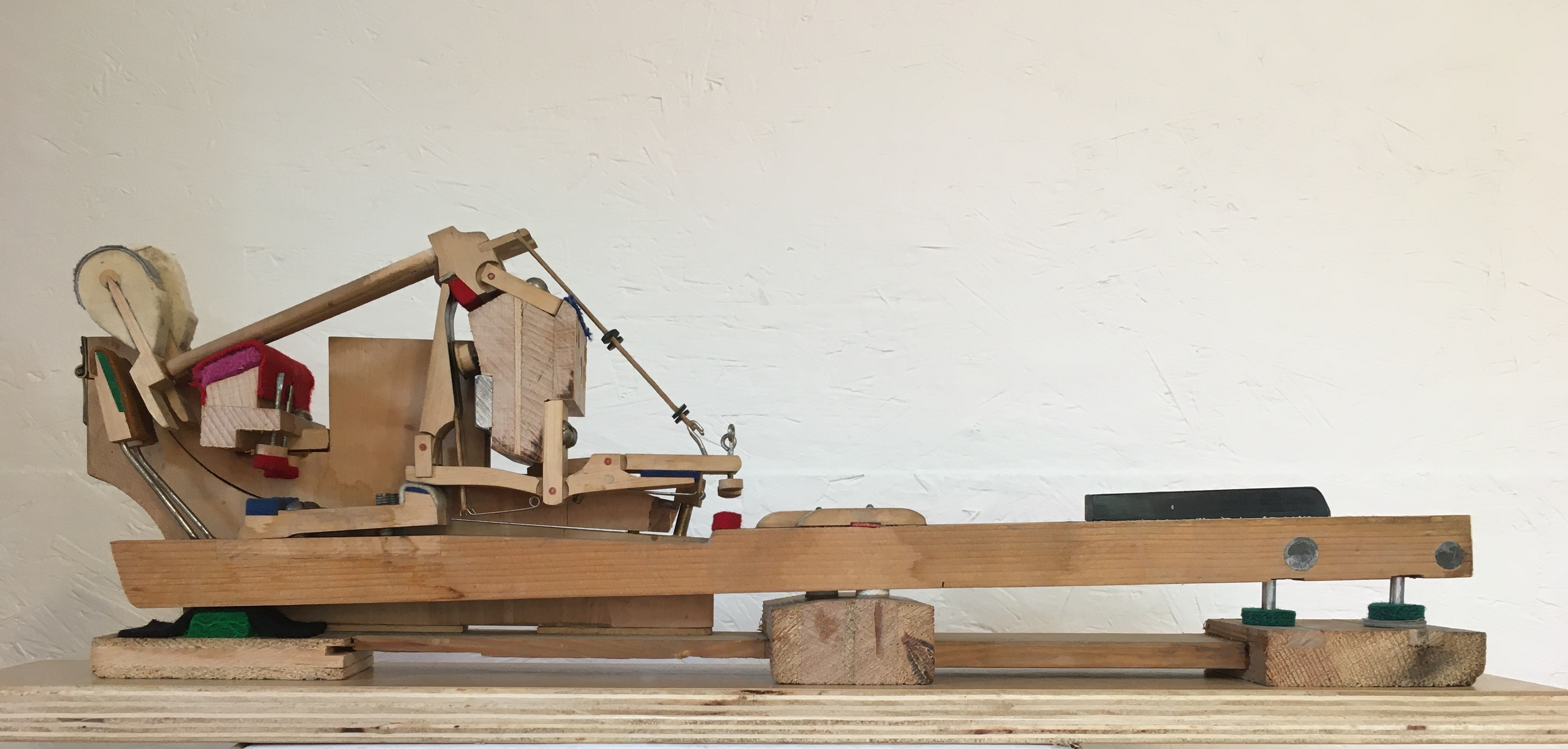
Grand Piano Action patented by Ed. Westermayer in 1880

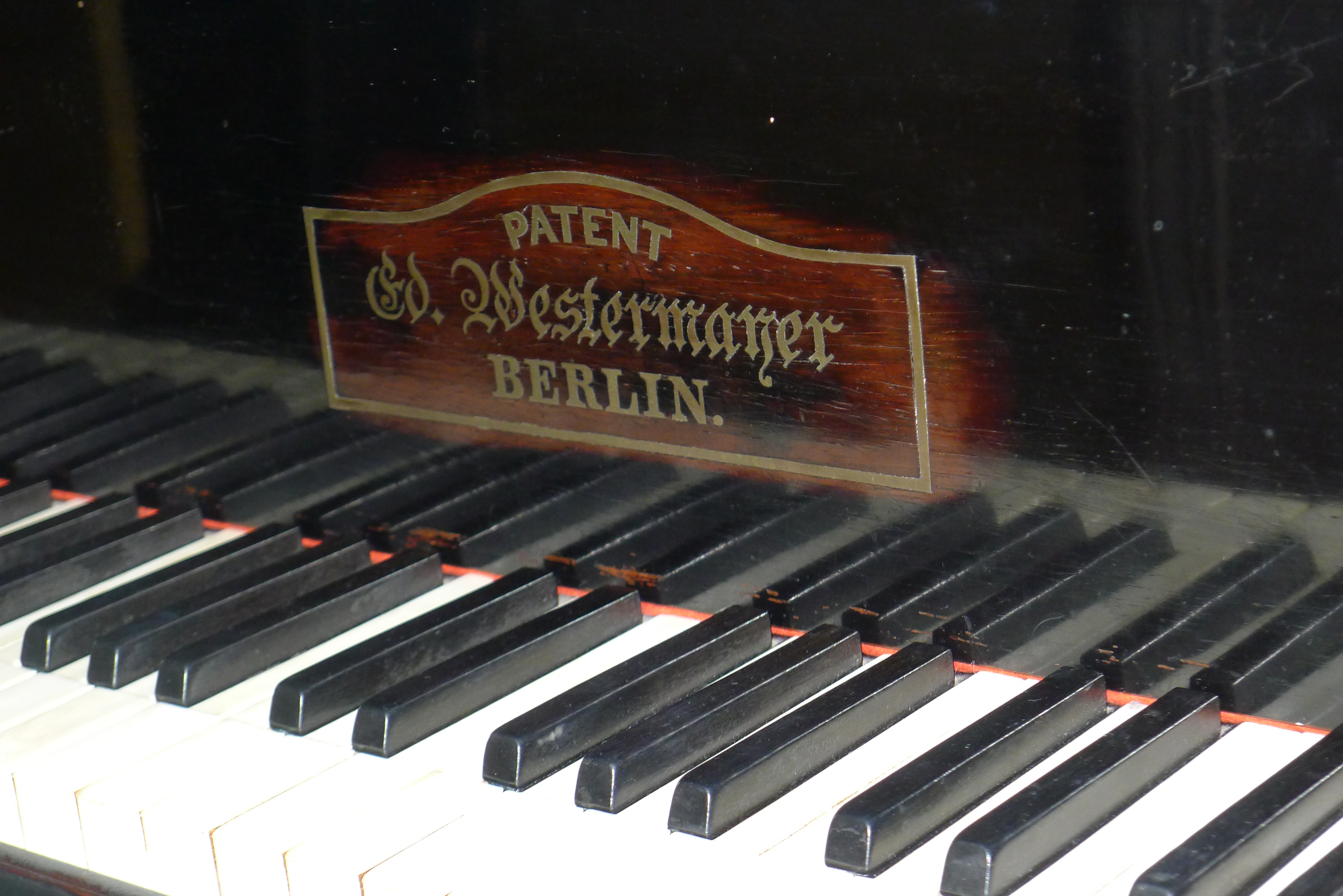
Fallboard of a Westermayer grand piano, ca 1875
