= Wilhelm Spaethe =

Wilhelm Spaethe was a piano manufacturer in Gera, Germany.

It was founded in 1858 by Wilhelm Spaethe senior. The owners Wilhelm Ernst Spaethe and Otto Paul Spaethe were awarded an imperial and royal warrant of appointment to the court of Austria-Hungary.

The company no longer builds pianos, but now specializes in restoration and repair of antique furniture.
