= Albert Fahr =

German piano manufacturer

Albert Fahr (German pronunciation: [ˈalbɛʁt ˈfaːɐ̯]) was a piano manufacturer in Zeitz in the Prussian Province of Saxony, Germany.

The owner Albert Fahr was awarded an imperial and royal warrant of appointment to the court of Austria-Hungary.
