= Ernst Kaps =

German piano manufacturer

Ernst Kaps Piano Fabrik
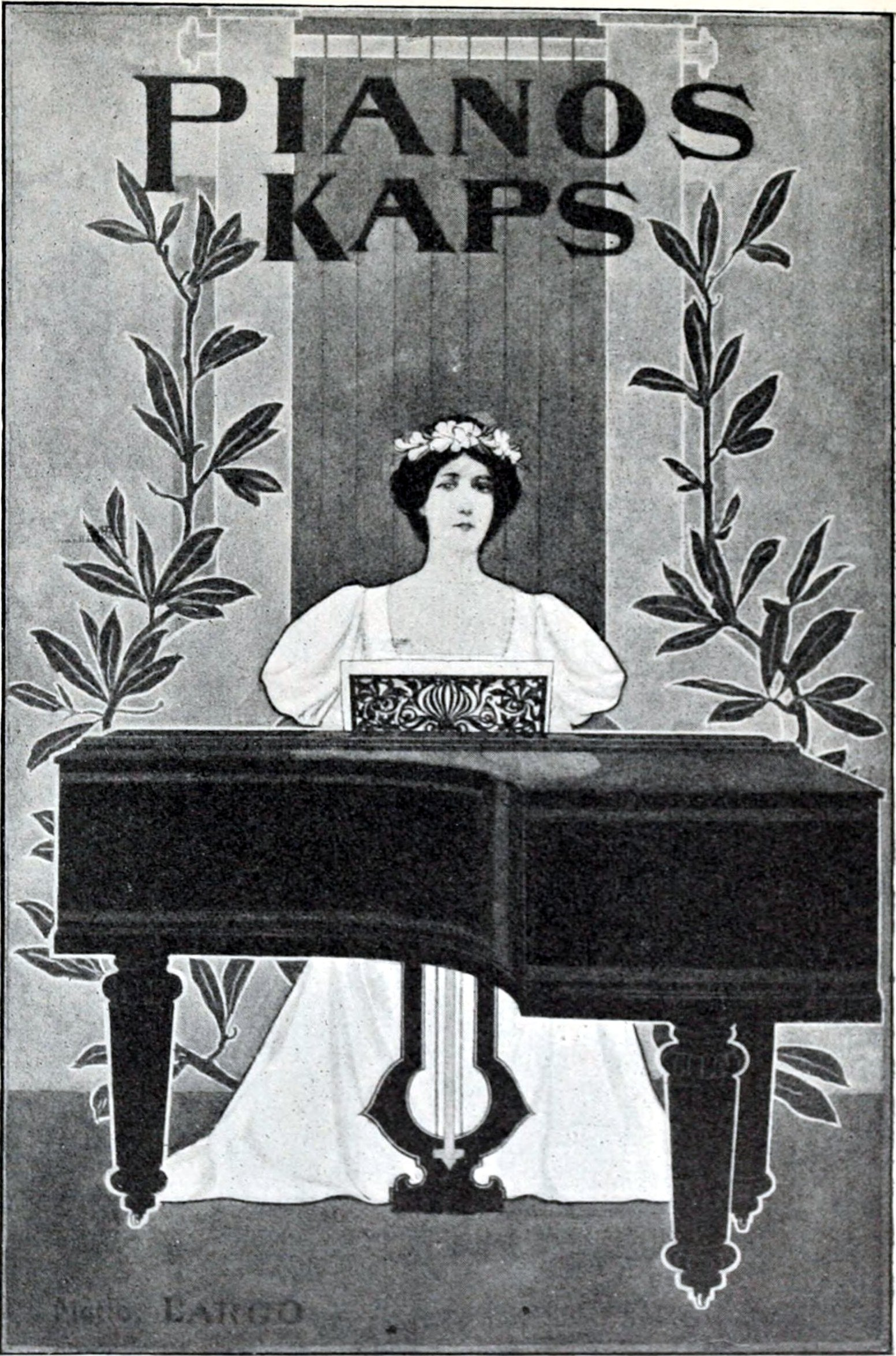
- Poster for Kaps pianos by Friedrich Brodauf
- Industry: Piano manufacturing
- Founded: Dresden, Germany 1858
- Founder: Ernst Karl Wilhelm Kaps

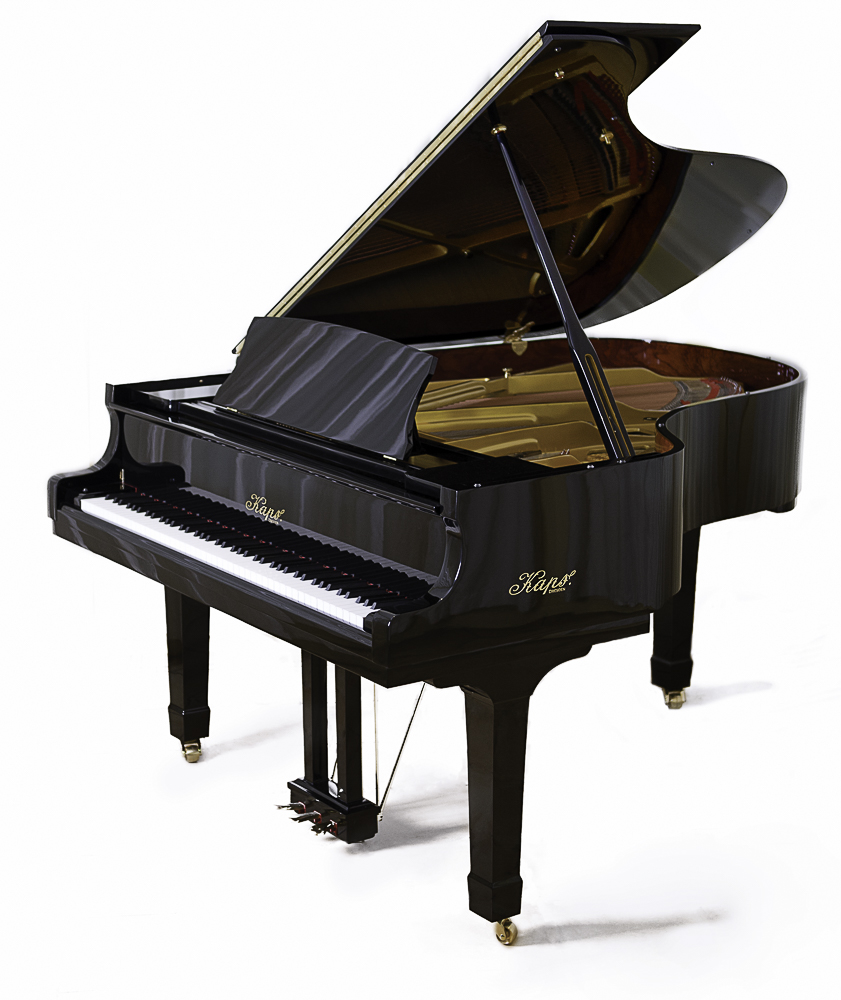
Picture of new ERNST KAPS MODEL 158B GRAND PIANO 2012

Ernst Kaps Piano Fabrik was a German piano manufacturer founded in 1858 with the original factory at 20 to 22 Seminarstrasse in Dresden, Germany. Kaps acquired the title of purveyor of the Kingdom of Saxony.

== History ==
The piano brand Kaps or Ernst Kaps Pianofortefabrik was founded and produced in Dresden Germany in 1858 by Ernst Karl Wilhelm Kaps. Ernst Kaps was born in Döbeln on 6 December 1826 and died in 1887 in Dresden, Saxony. Kaps was appointed in 1879 an honorary member of the Royal Swedish Academy of Music His son Ernst Eugen, born in 1864, died in early 1910 in Dresden under suspicious circumstances. A report suggested he may have taken his own life as a result of his company facing receivership. His second Son Wilhelm Karl, born in 1872, and died in 1943 in Tolkewitz. However, the "yearbook of wealth and income of the millionaires in the kingdom of Saxony" of 1912 states that two of the family members, Wilhelm and Gertrud Kaps, each had 1.3 M marks and an annual income of 0.11 M Marks. In 1876, the company exhibited at the Centennial International Exhibition in Philadelphia. In 1922, the company, then known as Ernst Kaps Piano Fabrik AG, merged with another company, owned and founded by Johann Kuhse, whose piano manufacturing business was founded in Dresden in 1874. In 1925 the factory, then known as the Kaps/Kuhse Pianoforte AG, made both piano brands alongside each other. The Dresden factory closed in 1930, and at this point the company had reported its final serial number as No. 37500. The Dresden factory produced 37,500 pianos and grand pianos and ever since 1885 manufactured a consistent 1,000 pianos per year. There were showrooms at 13 Altmarkt, Dresden and 18 Schloss -Strasse, Dresden with branches in Paris, London, Irkutsk Oblast and St Petersburg, Russia.

Production resumed under ownership of an Australian company in 2012 with Philip Shayer.

== Models ==
The table below shows the assignment of serial numbers to year of manufacture.

Serial No.	Year	Serial No.	Year	Serial No.	Year	Serial No.	Year
1 to 50	1858 to 1859	501 to 1000	1869 to 1871	20001 to 23000	1898 to 1899	37501 to 37700	2011 to 2012
51 to 100	1859 to 1860	1001 to 4000	1872 to 1876	23001 to 24000	1900 to 1901	37701 to 40000	2012 to 2013
101 to 150	1860 to 1861	4001 to 6000	1877 to 1879	24001 to 26000	1902 to 1903	40001 to 40500	2013 to 2014
151 to 200	1861 to 1862	6001 to 8000	1880 to 1882	26001 to 28000	1904 to 1905	40501 to 41450	2014 to 2015
201 to 250	1862 to 1863	8001 to 10000	1883 to 1884	28001 to 30000	1906 to 1908	41451 to 42000	2015 to 2016
251 to 300	1863 to 1864	10001 to 12000	1885 to 1887	30001 to 32000	1909 to 1911	42001 to 42500	2016 to 2017
301 to 350	1864 to 1865	12001 to 14000	1888 to 1889	32001 to 34000	1912 to 1916	42501 to 43000	2017 to 2018
351 to 400	1865 to 1866	14001 to 16000	1890 to 1892	34001 to 36000	1917 to 1921		
401 to 450	1866 to 1867	16001 to 18000	1893 to 1895	Kaps & Kuhse	1922 to 1930		
451 to 500	1867 to 1868	18001 to 20000	1896 to 1897	36001 to 37500	1922 to 1930		

== Jean-Henri Pape and Kaps ==
It was Jean-Henri Pape (1789–1875), the teacher of Carl Bechstein, who invented and put into use the system of high tension steel strings and copper wound over steel in pianos. Pape, who was also the true inventor of the overstrung piano in 1826, along with many other successful and not so successful inventions, invented the design of an additional pressure bar or individual capo/s located between the hitch pins and the bridges (a similar system later patented by Theodore Steinway in 1872) now known as "duplex scaling". He also introduced the use of compressed felt for hammers. A good number of these are still in use today.

Some of Pape's more successful inventions were employed by a small number of manufacturers fairly early in piano making history, such as Erard, Steinweg, Steinway and Ernst Kaps. In discussions with Pape, it was Ernst Kaps that expanded on Pape's design, inventing a system of double over-stringing in 1865. This design employed three bridges, Bass, tenor and treble, enabling the production of the, previously troubled, baby grand piano. This then allowed for a 5 ft (154 cm) length piano to be successfully produced early in piano making history.

As a result of this and other effective inventions, including one known as the "Panzer system" in upright pianos, the company enjoyed many years of commercial success prior to the Dresden factory ceasing production in 1930 reported to have produced some 37,500 pianos at that site.

Ernst Kaps obtained a number of patents on various interesting inventions. One of these included the "resonator". This consisted of an additional sound-box with small sound ports(holes)drilled through the top. These were fixed to just below the tenor and treble bridges along the bridges profile. The idea of these were that this would create a larger vibrational mass and additional coincident partials (harmonics)—a complex endeavour to attempt a fuller and more colourful sound.

== Inventions and patents ==
The inventions and developments of Kaps were often patented, including a resonator and a baby grand piano (double overstrung grand piano). Other similar and ingenious inventions were patented by Ernst Kaps such as a device that extended the soundboard into the grand piano lid. Although revolutionary, most were not economically practical and were not commercially produced.

=== Resonator ===
One interesting and important invention was the patented resonator as is commonly referred to, whereas, it was officially called, and referred to by Ernst Kaps as the 'sound hood', a device through which additional harmonics were created, particularly in the higher registers.

This consists of a device in the form of a harp shaped sound box contoured to the bridges which is screwed onto the soundboard. Ernst Kaps obtained a number of patents on various interesting inventions. These additional sound-box fixtures, with small sound ports (holes) drilled through the top, were attached to just below the tenor and treble bridges along the bridge profiles. The idea of these were that this would create 'a larger vibrational mass' and additional 'coincident partials (harmonics)'. A complex endeavour to attempt a fuller and more colourful sound. Ernst Kaps stated that "Each resonant case maybe of a size and length to respond acoustically to the note of the strings passing through it. The resonant cases form in the aggregate what I term a "sound-hood". I am aware that sounding-boxes have been attached to different parts of a piano, such as to the frame or the sounding-board. In all such cases the vibration of the sounding board or case was depended upon to give vibrations to the boxes. In my improvement the air in each resonant case receives a vibration from the string itself when it is struck, thereby the resonant vibrations of the string are communicated directly to the air of the case, which responds thereto". As mentioned, "this device served to give increased resonance to the thinner tones of the soprano and higher registers for a significant boost and timbre, while providing a more consistent and defined ratio between the sound levels".

=== Baby grand ===
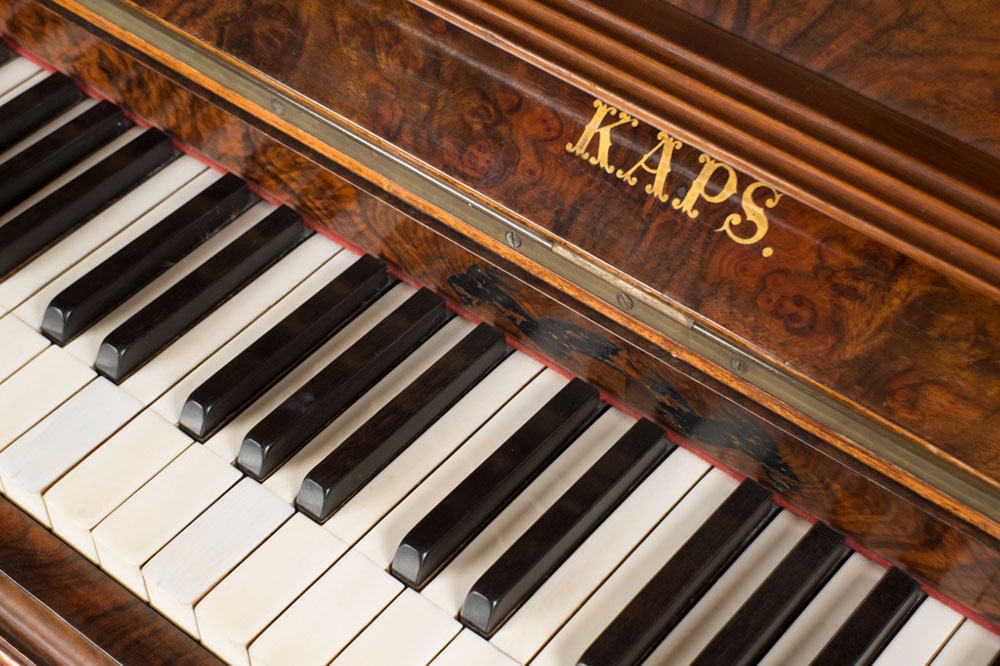
Ernst Kaps, Dresden, Germany Percy Grainger’s childhood practice piano, late 19th century Walnut, ivory; 133 x 158 x 69cm Donated by Mr and Mrs Thomas P. Husband, 1935 Accession number 00.0057 Grainger Museum collection, University of Melbourne

In 1865, Kaps built the first double overstrung grand piano. Named ‘the system Kaps’ which referred to a triple bridge arrangement to aid the awkward scaling design, limited by the previously unsuccessful, small sized grand, which were only about 1.50 m long. Previous attempts at producing a successful small grand piano failed until this time and subsequently, the Kaps Double overstrung 5 ft grand piano, quickly became a revelation. Hailed as the first successful small grand, later known and promoted by another maker as the "baby grand piano", launched Kaps pianos into commercial success.

== Percy Grainger's Kaps piano ==
Percy Grainger learned to play on an upright parlour piano of Walnut veneer and ivory keys, made and supplied by Ernst Kaps of Dresden to Rose Grainger. He reported to have practiced on it for two hours a day, while his mother Rose Grainger, as his teacher, sat beside him. In 1895 the Graingers left for Germany when the piano was then sold to a Mr and Mrs Thomas P. Husband, whose family were also taught by Rose. They kept it for 40 years, before donating it to the Grainger Museum at the Melbourne University in 1935. The piano has now been restored and is housed on display at the 'Percy Grainger Museum Melbourne Australia'.
