= Henry Behning, Sr. =

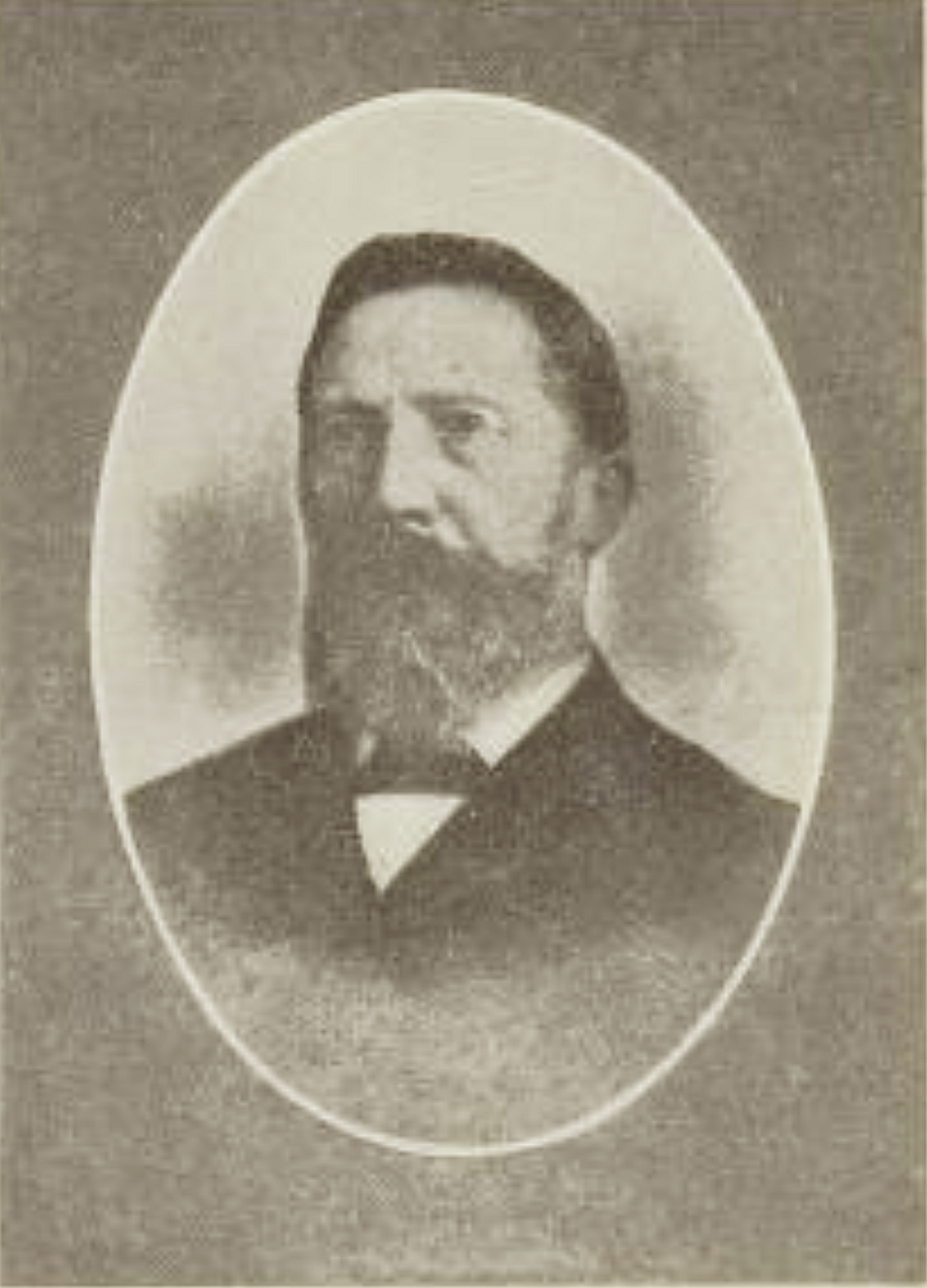
Henry Behning, Sr.

Henry Behning, Sr. (3 November 1832 – 9 June 1905) was a German-born American piano maker. In 1861 he founded the Behning Piano Company in New York City which later became Behning & Sons when his children joined in piano manufacturing company. The company continued to make pianos until it was acquired by Kohler & Campbell in 1926. Kohler & Campbell continued to use the Behning & Sons name after acquiring the company.

== Life and career ==
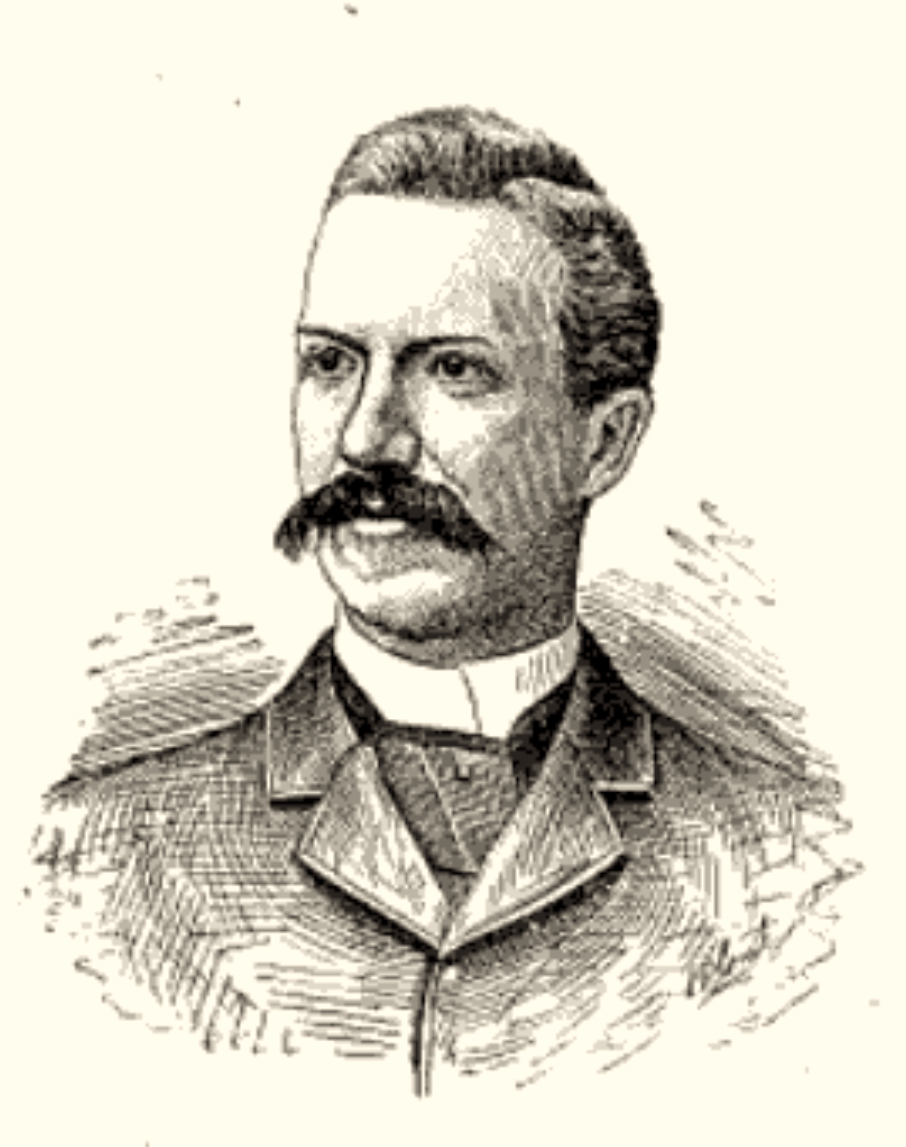
Henry Behning, Jr., the son of Henry Behning, Sr.

Henry Behning, Sr. was born in Hanover, Germany on 3 November 1832. He apprenticed as a piano maker in the factory of Julius Gercke. In 1856 he immigrated to the United States where he initially worked in New York City for the piano manufacturing firm of Lighte, Newton, & Bradbury. He left that job in 1857 to take another position with a company in Bridgeport, Connecticut. His son, Henry Behning Jr., was born two years later. Behning, Sr. served briefly in the Union Army during the American Civil War.

In 1861 Behning, Sr. founded the Behning Piano Company (BPC) in New York City. In 1864 he was joined in this enterprise by Albrecht Klix; opening a shop on Elm Street in New York City. Justus Diehl joined the BPC as a partner in 1873. In 1866 his son Albert was born, and in 1868 his son Gustav was born.

After Klix's retirement, Behning, Sr. brought his son Behning, Jr. into the BPC as a partner. At this time the company was rebranded Behning & Son. Later both Albert and Gustav came to work for the company, at which point the company became Behning & Sons. The company was very successful during the latter part of the 19th century, and sold pianos as far away as the American Southwest.

Behning died on June 9, 1905 at the age of 72. His sons continued to operate the company until 1926 when it was acquired by Kohler & Campbell who continued to manufacture pianos using the Behning & Sons name.
