= W. Ritmüller & Sohn =

W. Ritmüller & Sohn AG was a piano manufacturer originated in Göttingen, Germany.

== History ==
In the late 18th century, Andreas Georg Ritmüller and his son, Gottlieb Wilhelm Ritmüller (1772-1829), began production of lutes, guitars, and harps in Göttingen. In 1795, the production of piano began in their workshop, and after the father's death in c. 1800, the company was officially named "G. W. Ritmüller."

Two sons of Gottlieb Wilhelm Ritmüller, Johann Wilhelm (born 1802) and Johann Martin (born 1803), joined the company. Gottlieb Wilhelm Ritmüller died in 1829, and the company was renamed "W. Ritmüller & Sohn."

The company became bankrupt in 1890 and was sold. With changing owners and partners, the production continued in Göttingen and later in Berlin. The company was converted into GmbH in 1901, then AG in 1920. After financial difficulties, in 1929, the facilities were leased to Gebr. Niendorf Pianofortefabrik AG. In 1933, W. Ritmüller & Sohn AG was liquidated.

In 1990, the Pearl River Piano Group in China registered the trademark "Ritmüller" in Germany, then worldwide, and have used the brand name "Ritmüller" for their premium pianos since 1997, however this brand has no connection to W. Ritmüller & Sohn.'
