= Danemann Pianos =

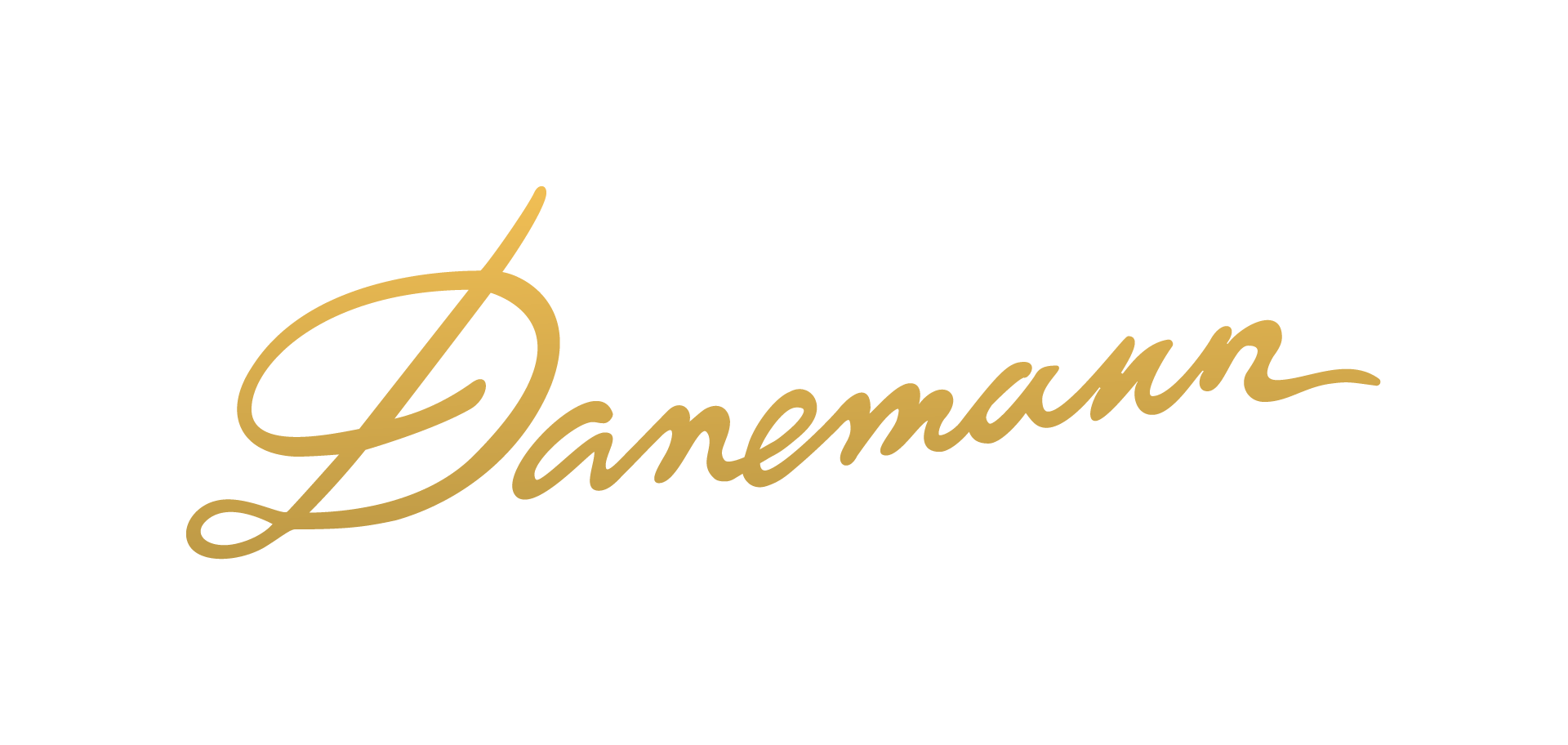
- Company type: Private
- Industry: Piano manufacturing
- Area served: Worldwide
- Products: Pianos
- Website: www.danemannpianos.com

Danemann Pianos is a British manufacturer of pianos, originally based in Islington, London. From 1893 to 1980 they produced a wide range of pianos from small to large uprights, 5' 2" grands, 6' 8" grands and 9' 6" concert grands. Their actions were built and supplied by Renner, Schwander and British Piano Actions. Among their customers were British embassies, the P&O Lines and many educational institutions. Their pianos were exported worldwide including tropicalized versions for India and Africa. The company also made pianos for other companies, including Pohlmann.

Many examples of these pianos can be found in the UK. Danemann pianos were supplied to schools and colleges across the world.

== History ==
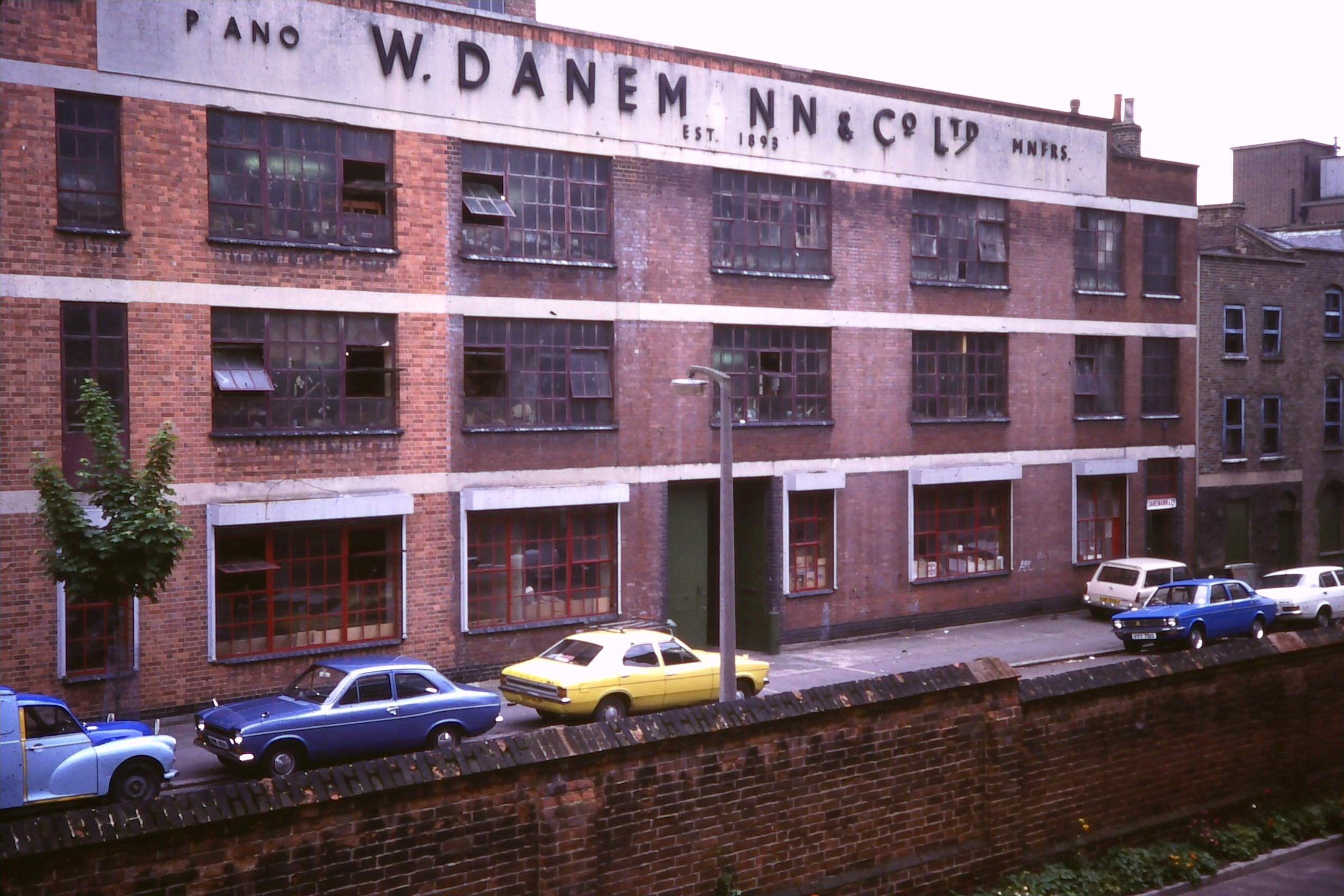
Danemann factory, Islington; summer 1979

After the Second World War, the company concentrated their efforts into making instruments of very high quality rather than supplying to the mass market. They were constructed from the best materials available at the time. Their school pianos came with built-in safety features such as solid toe pegs located at the front and back of the piano, safety falls (key hoods) and double rubber castors so the piano could be wheeled around a school hall and over small thresholds with ease.

In 1963 Stanley Murdoch, piano buyers for Harrods, commissioned W. Danemann and Company to build "the best upright in the world"; the result was the HS2, based on the classic Danemann upright.

In 1982 Broadwood purchased Danemann Pianos and the factory. In 1985 the company was purchased by Gardner Pianos in Cardiff, making Gardners the first Welsh piano makers. They made approximately 350 Danemann pianos in Wales until production ceased in 1994.

== Present day ==
In 2015 Gardners sold the rights to the Danemann name; Danemann Pianos is now owned by Broughton Piano Ltd. Danemann Pianos' office is based in Drayton, Worcestershire, and the instruments have been manufactured in China since 2017. The new Danemann pianos have the same logo as the pianos manufactured in Britain but contain no designs or influence from the original Danemann company. They are sold in UK, USA and Africa.

== Gallery ==
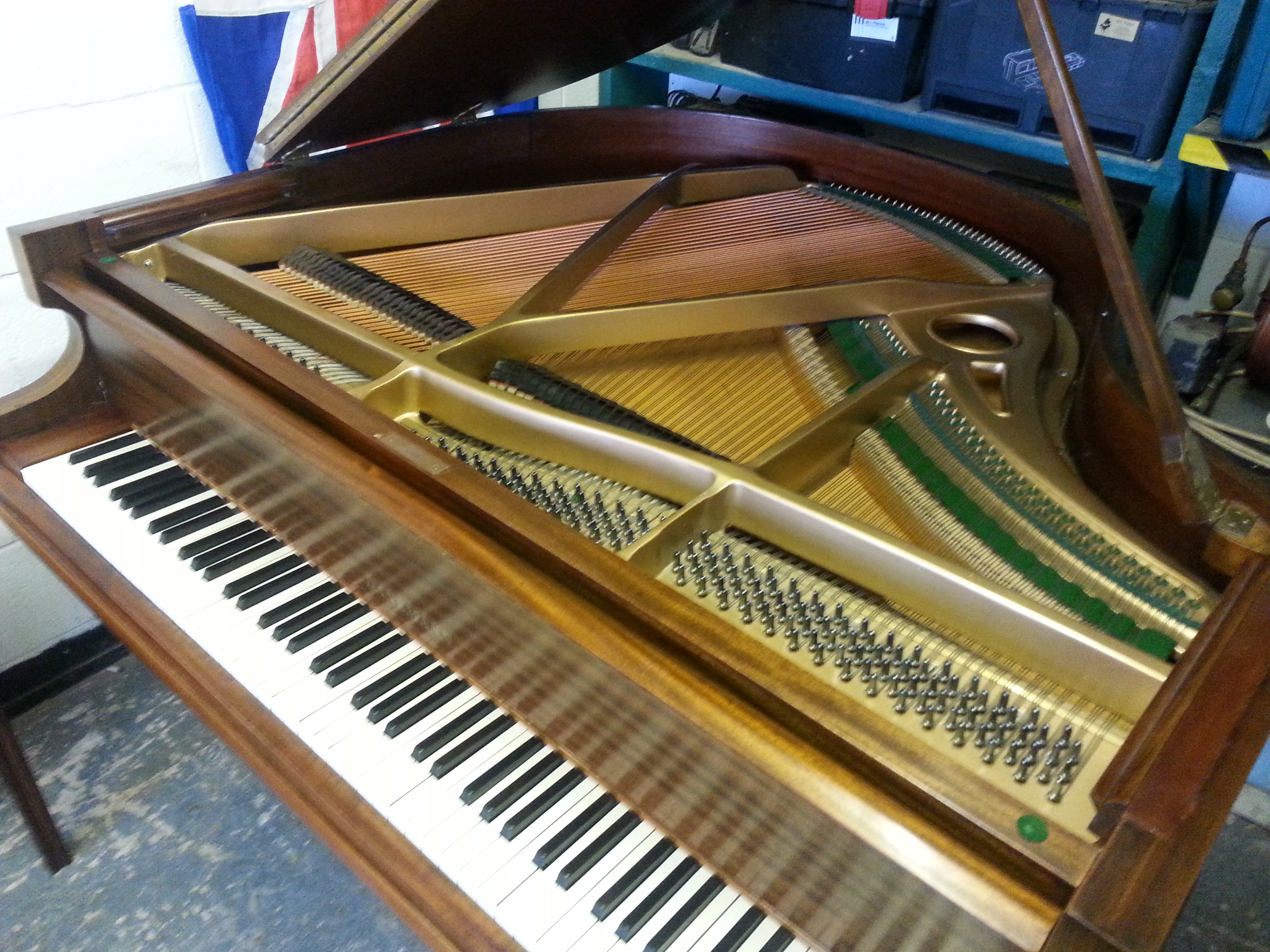
Danemann baby grand

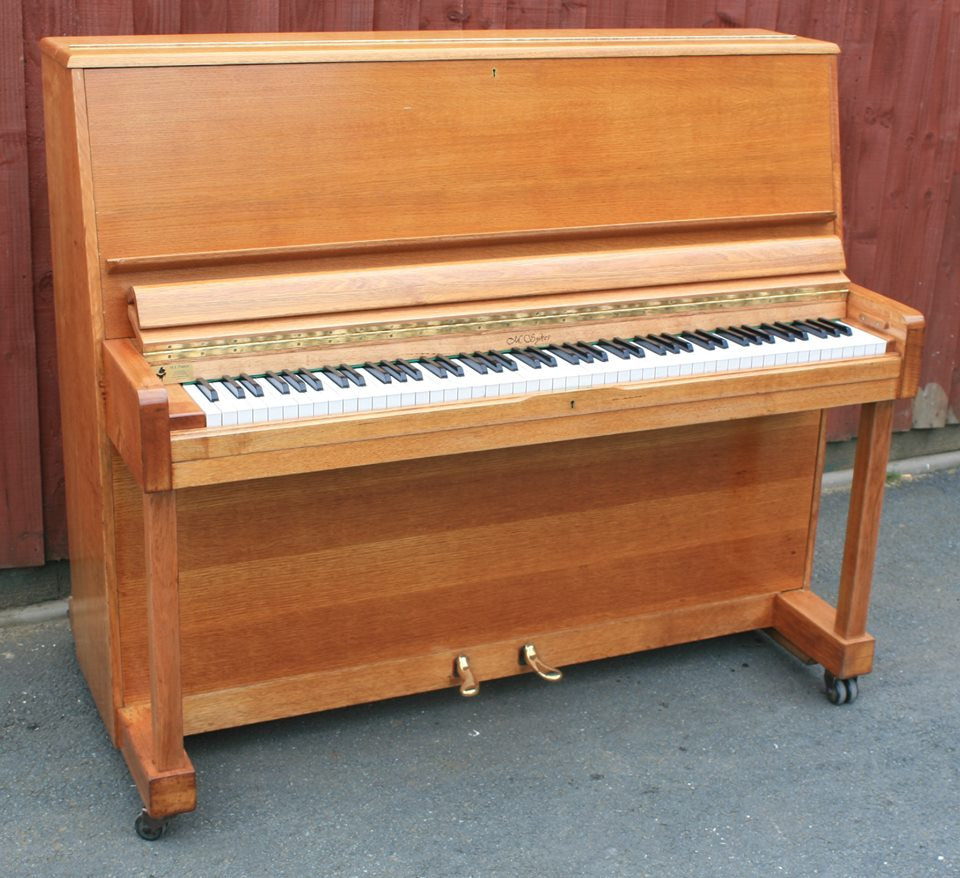
Danemann School Piano in Oak Case

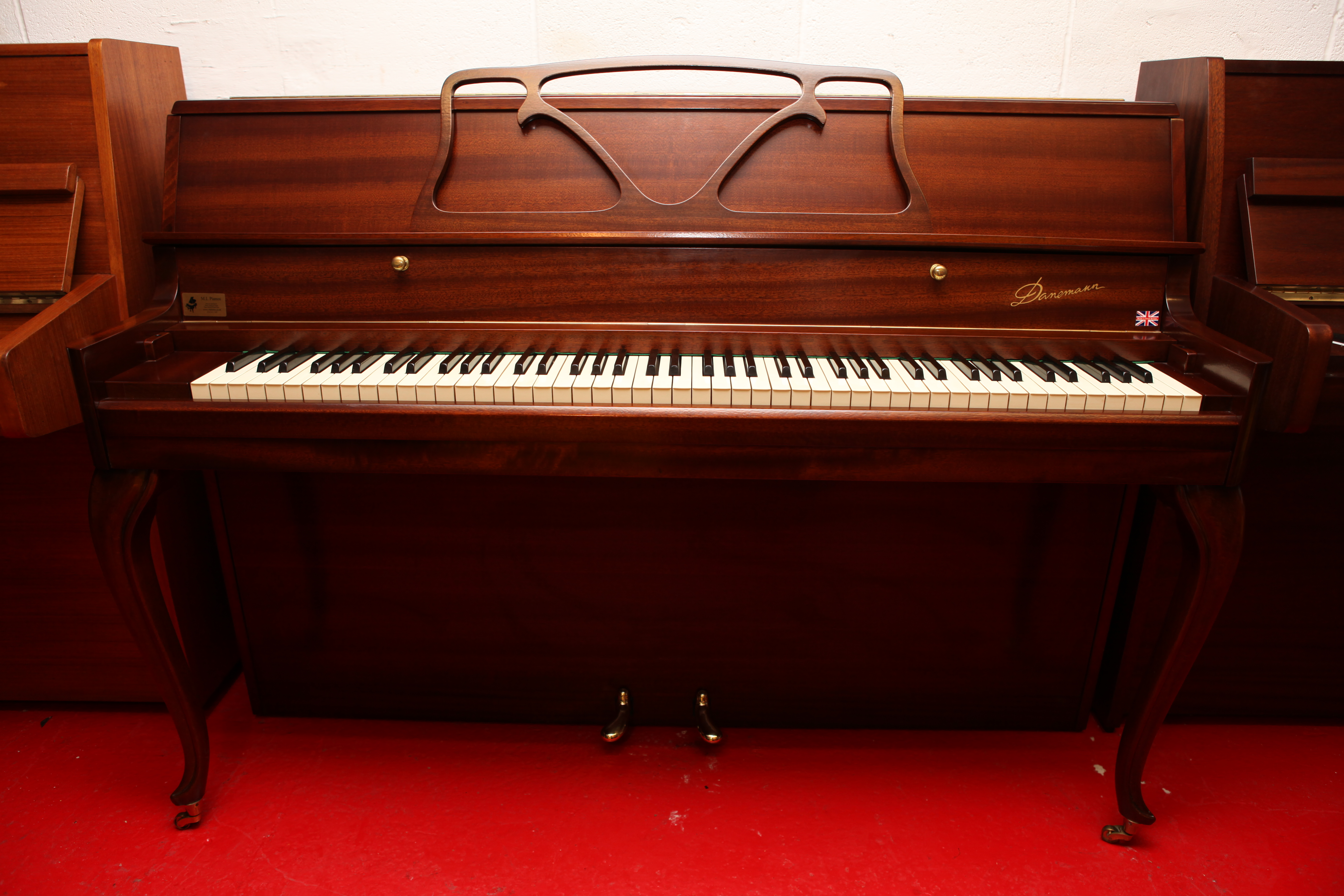
Danemann upright piano

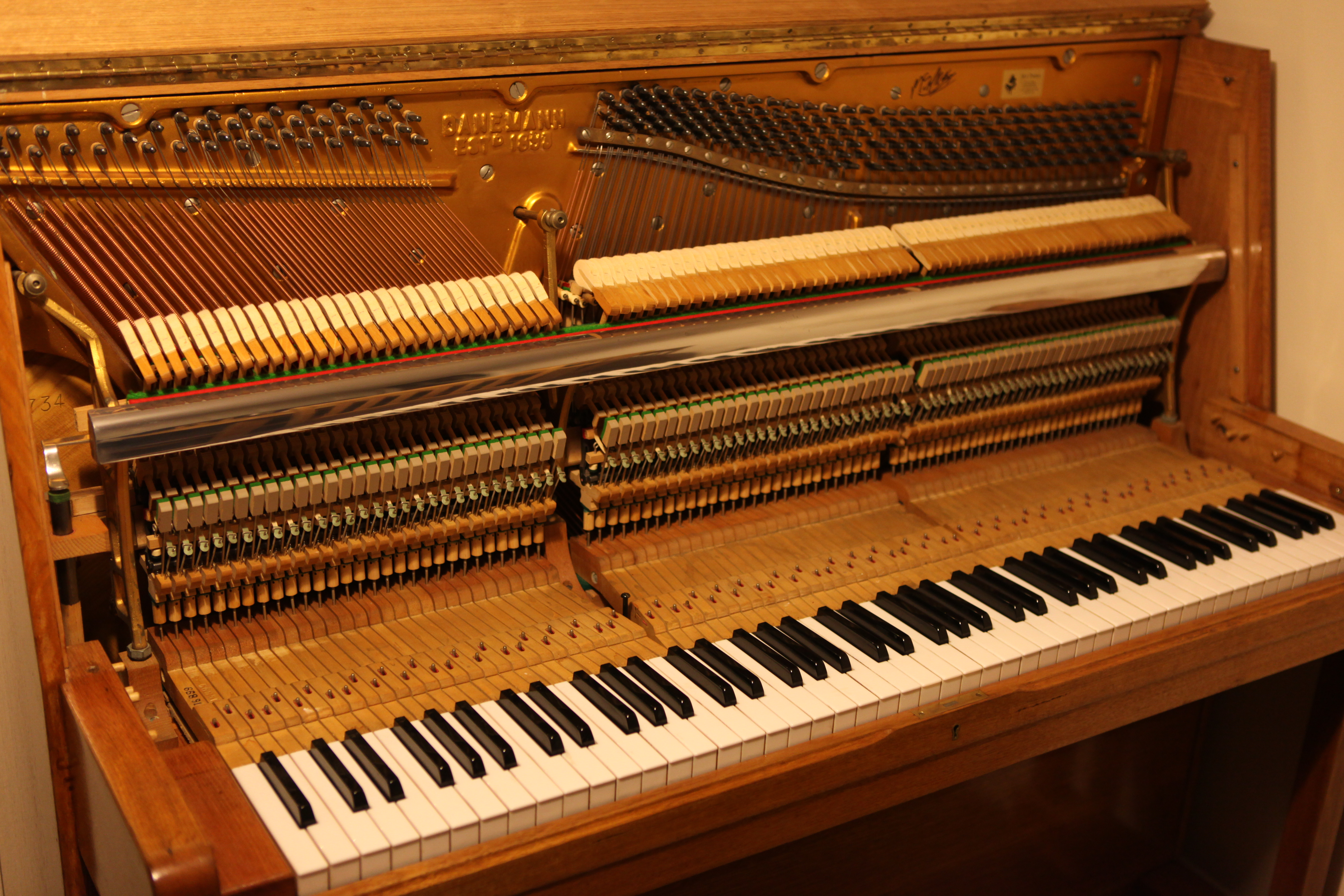
Danemann School Piano

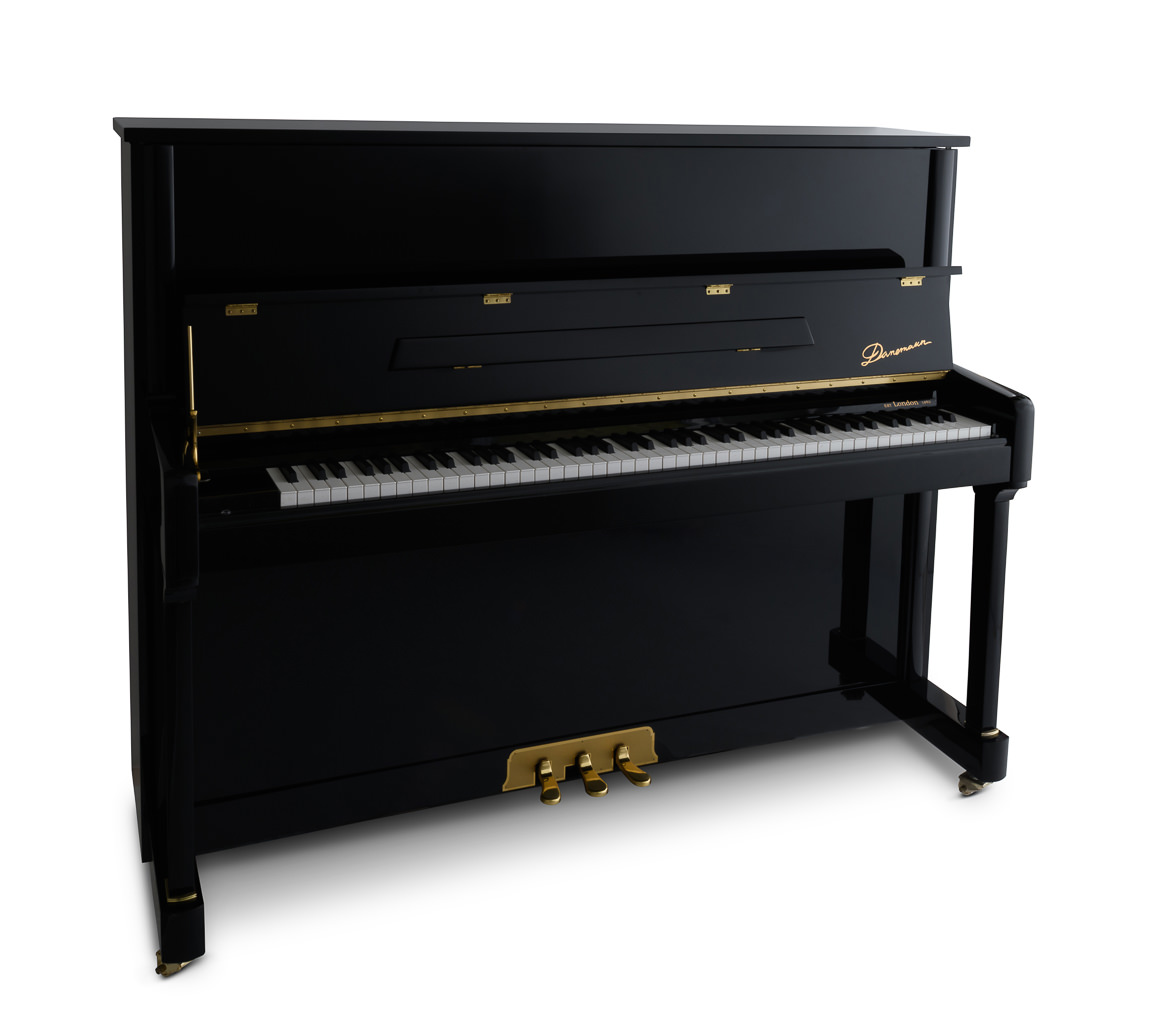
Danemann DU - 126

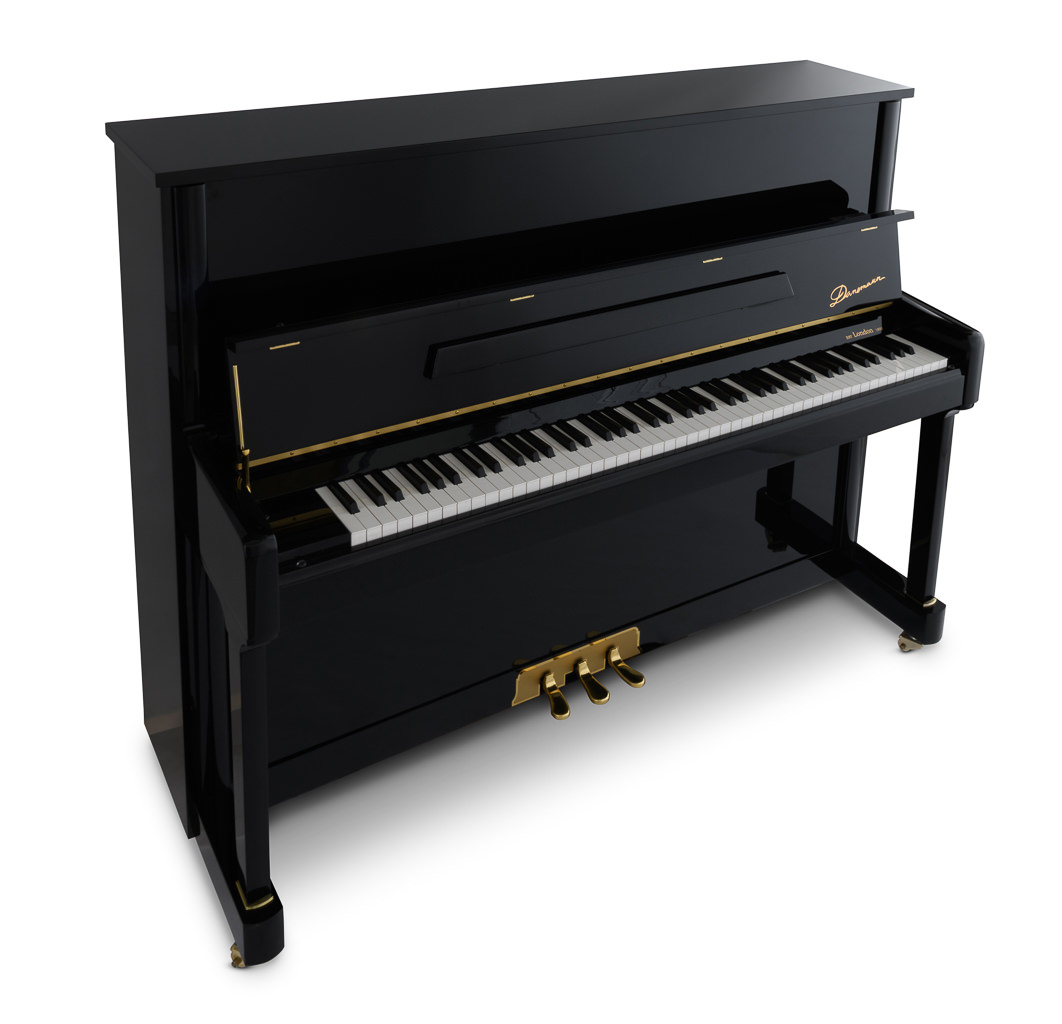
Danemann Du- 123

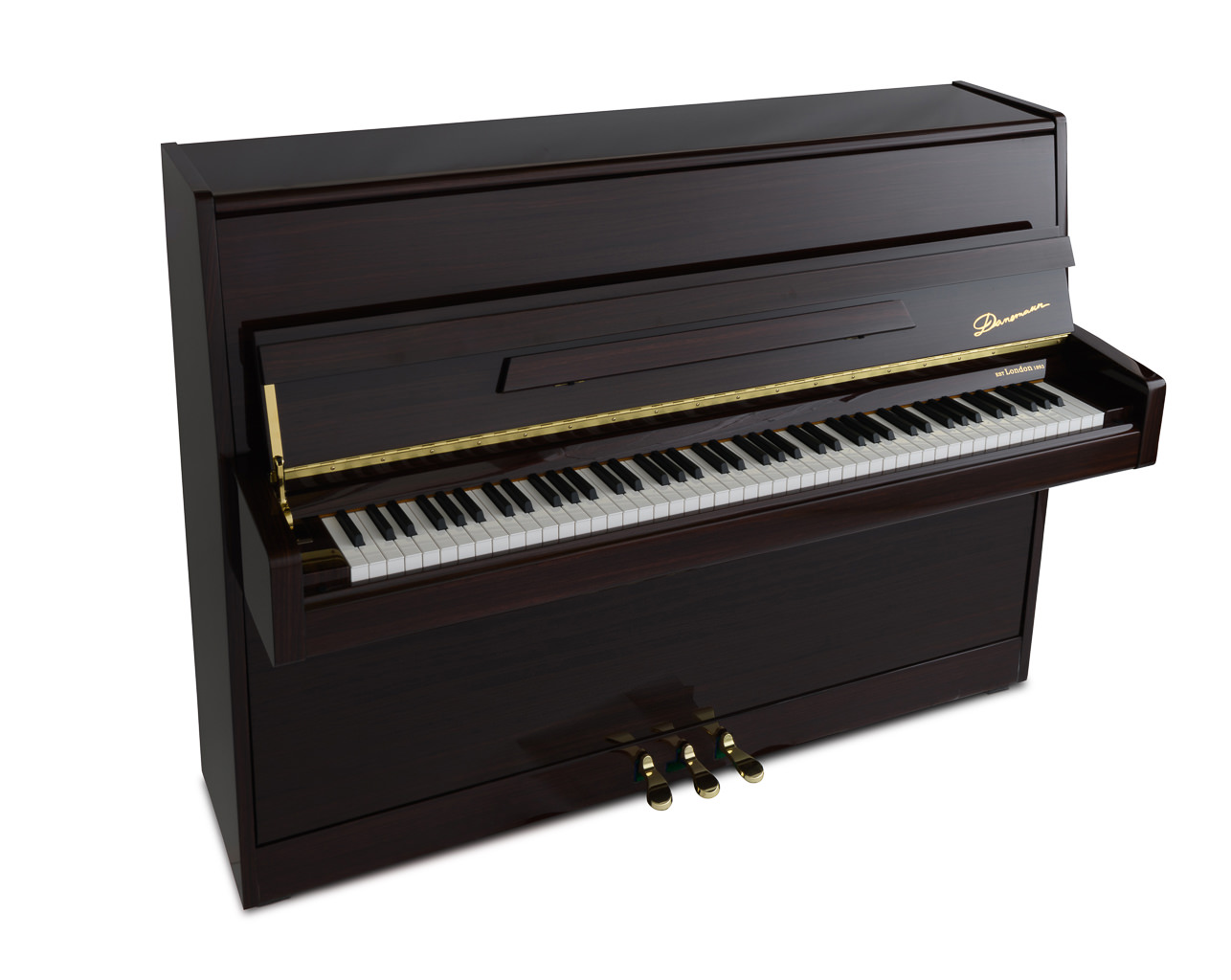
Danemann DU- 110

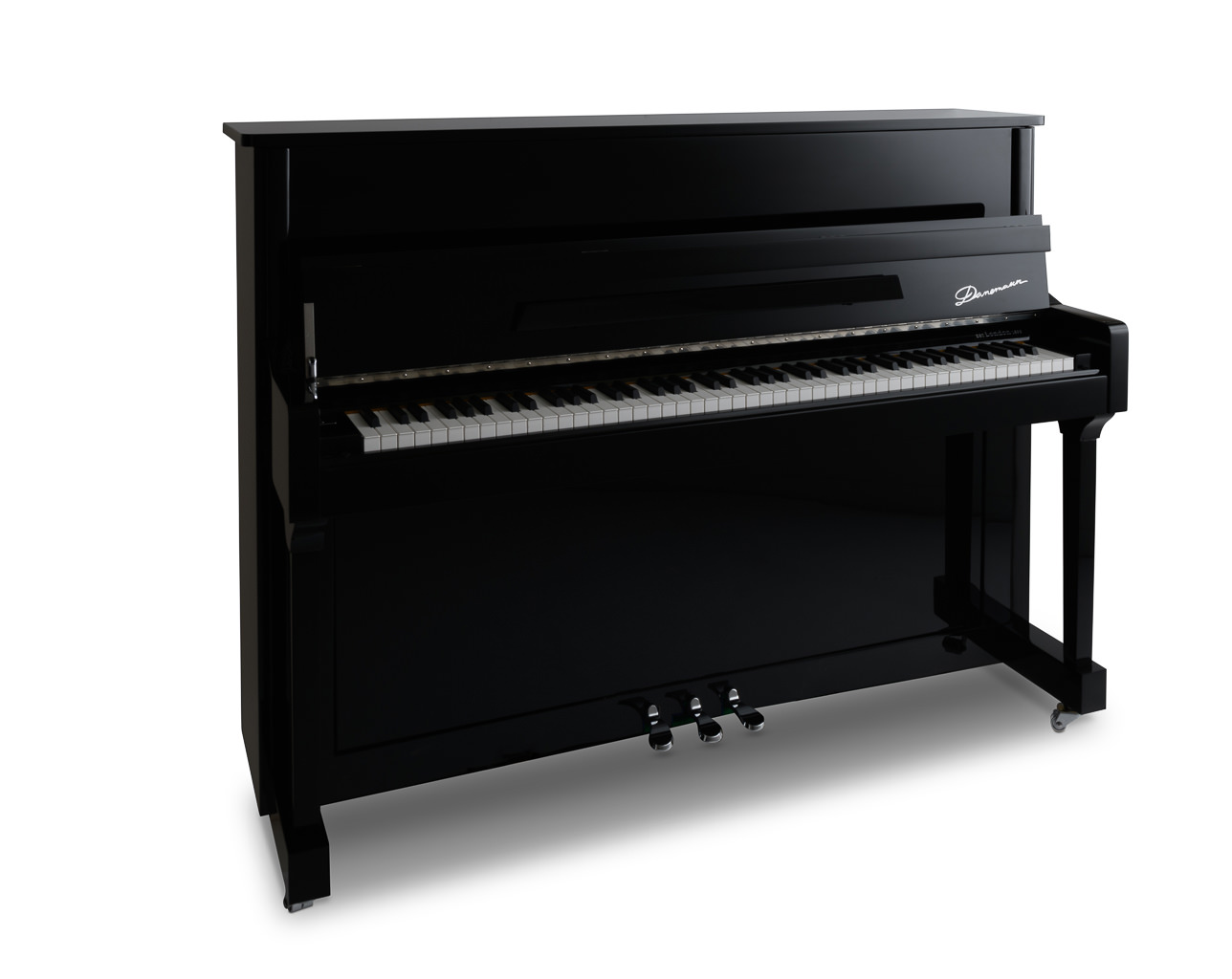
Danemann DU- 115
