= H. Kohl =

H. Kohl was a piano manufacturer in Hamburg, Germany.

The owners Theodor John Hellmund Ahrens and Heinrich Peter Blanck were awarded an imperial and royal warrant of appointment to the court of Austria-Hungary.
