= Rud. Ibach Sohn =

German piano manufacturer

- Company type: Private
- Industry: Musical instruments, piano manufacturing
- Founded: 1883
- Defunct: 2007
- Headquarters: Barmen, Rhineland, Germany
- Area served: Europe
- Key people: Rudolf Ibach, Max Ibach
- Products: Pianos
- Owner: Ibach family

Rud. Ibach Sohn was a piano manufacturer in Barmen, Rhineland, Germany from 1794 to 2007.

The owners Rudolf Ibach's widow, Rudolf and Max Ibach were awarded an imperial and royal warrant of appointment to the court of Austria-Hungary.
