= Belarus (pianos) =

Manufacturer of upright pianos

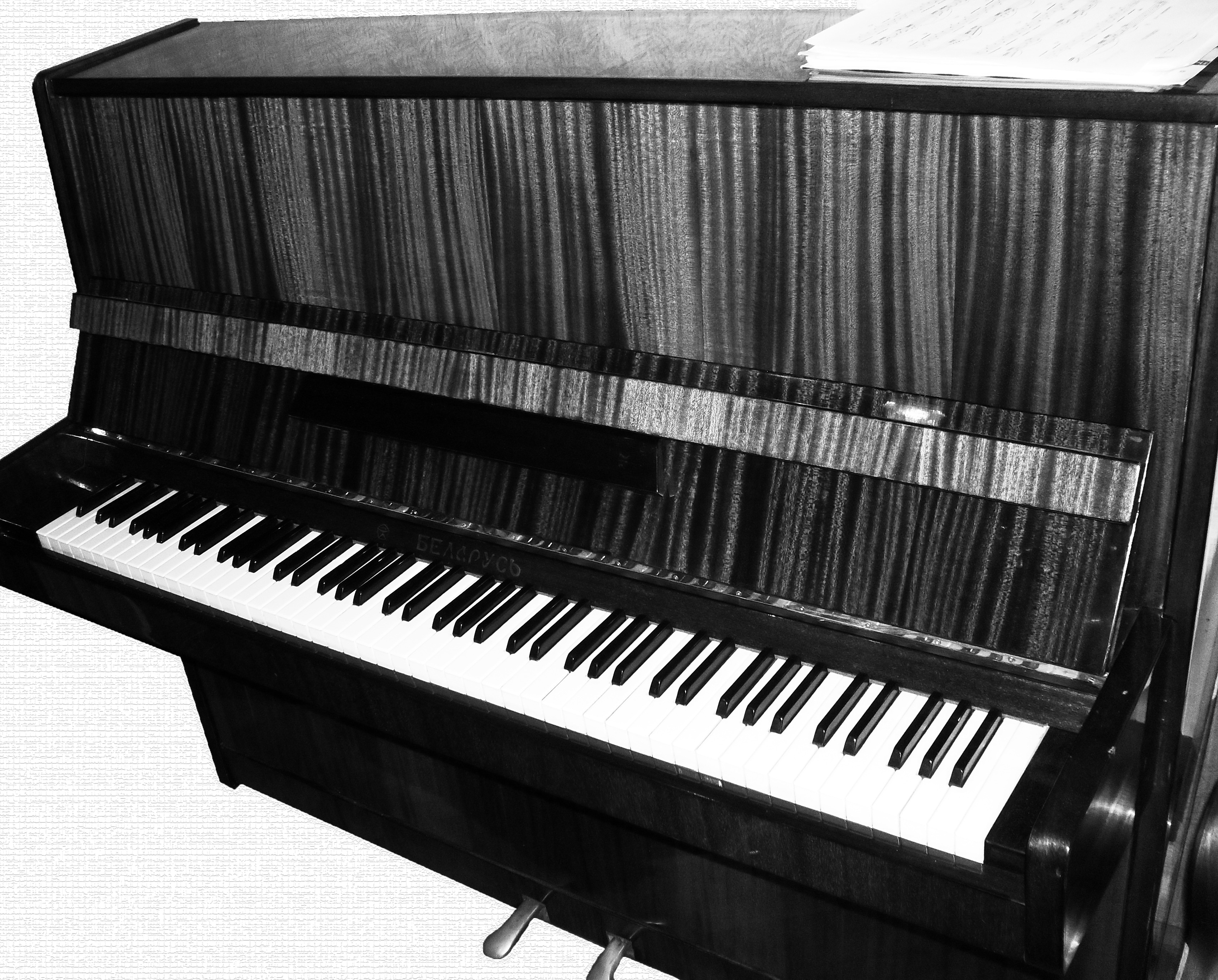
A Belarus piano.

Belarus (Беларусь) is a Belarusian manufacturer of upright pianos, founded in 1935 in Belarus (then the Soviet Union). It was owned by the joint-stock company "Muzinstrument - Borisov". It is also known as the piano manufactures Sängler & Söhne, Schubert and Wieler pianos.

In 2018, the company that produced pianos was declared bankrupt. As of 2020, the liquidation of the company was in progress and the company found new ownership in July.

In 2019 the revived company delivered almost 50 Grand Pianos to art schools and cultural centers of the Mogilev region by state orders, with 669 instruments produced in total during that year. In the second half of 2020 the Minsk factory reached 464 instruments it is reported, with the government ordered 5 year plan the production is to be reach at 2500 instruments.

== See also ==
- List of piano brand names
