= Davenport & Treacy =

Manufacturer of pianos

The Davenport & Treacy Company (sometimes rendered as Davenport-Treacy) was a manufacturer of pianos and piano components that was established in 1868 in New York City. It was founded by John Davenport, a graduate of Yale University; and Col. Daniel F. Treacy, an engineer.

By 1889, the company had a 2.5-acre factory complex in Stamford, Connecticut, on the waterfront. Working around the clock except on Sundays, the company cast some 60 piano plates a day, consuming some 60 tons of iron each week, for annual output of more than 15,000 piano plates a year.

Davenport & Treacy pianos sailed aboard the USS McCulloch, a United States Revenue Cutter Service cutter; and the USS Albatross, the first research ship built especially for marine research, racking up more than 20,000 miles at sea aboard the latter.
