= J. G. Irmler =

- Company type: Private
- Industry: Musical instruments, piano manufacturing
- Founder: Johann Christian Gottlieb Irmler
- Defunct: 1950s
- Headquarters: Leipzig, Saxony, Germany
- Area served: Europe
- Key people: Emil Irmler, Otto Irmler, Oswald Irmler
- Products: Pianos
- Owner: Irmler family

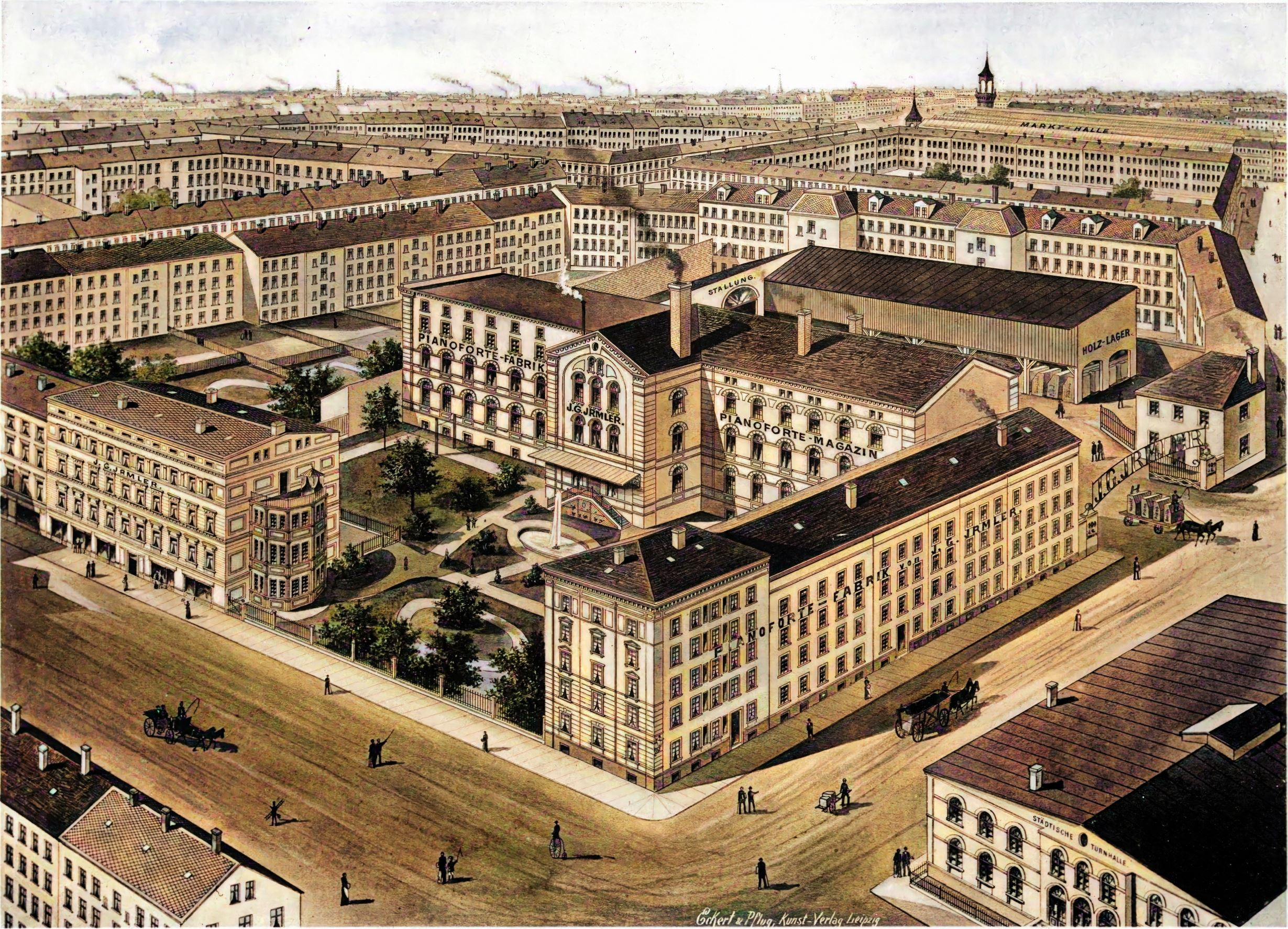
J. G. Irmler pianoforte factory in Leipzig, c. 1893

J. G. Irmler was a piano manufacturer in Leipzig, Saxony.

The owners Emil and Otto Irmler were awarded an Imperial and Royal Warrant of Appointment to the court of Austria-Hungary.

Johann Christian Gottlieb Irmler died in 1857, and his sons took control of the company. Otto and Oswald Irmler modernized European piano manufacturing around 1861 with steam-powered machines. The company enjoyed an excellent reputation, and its instruments were considered some of the finest in Europe. Oswald Irmler continued to run the company until his death in 1905, at which point his sons took over the business. The Irmler Piano Company continued to build high-quality, expensive pianos in Leipzig until it ceased operations in the 1950s.
