= Bogs & Voigt =

Former German piano manufacturer

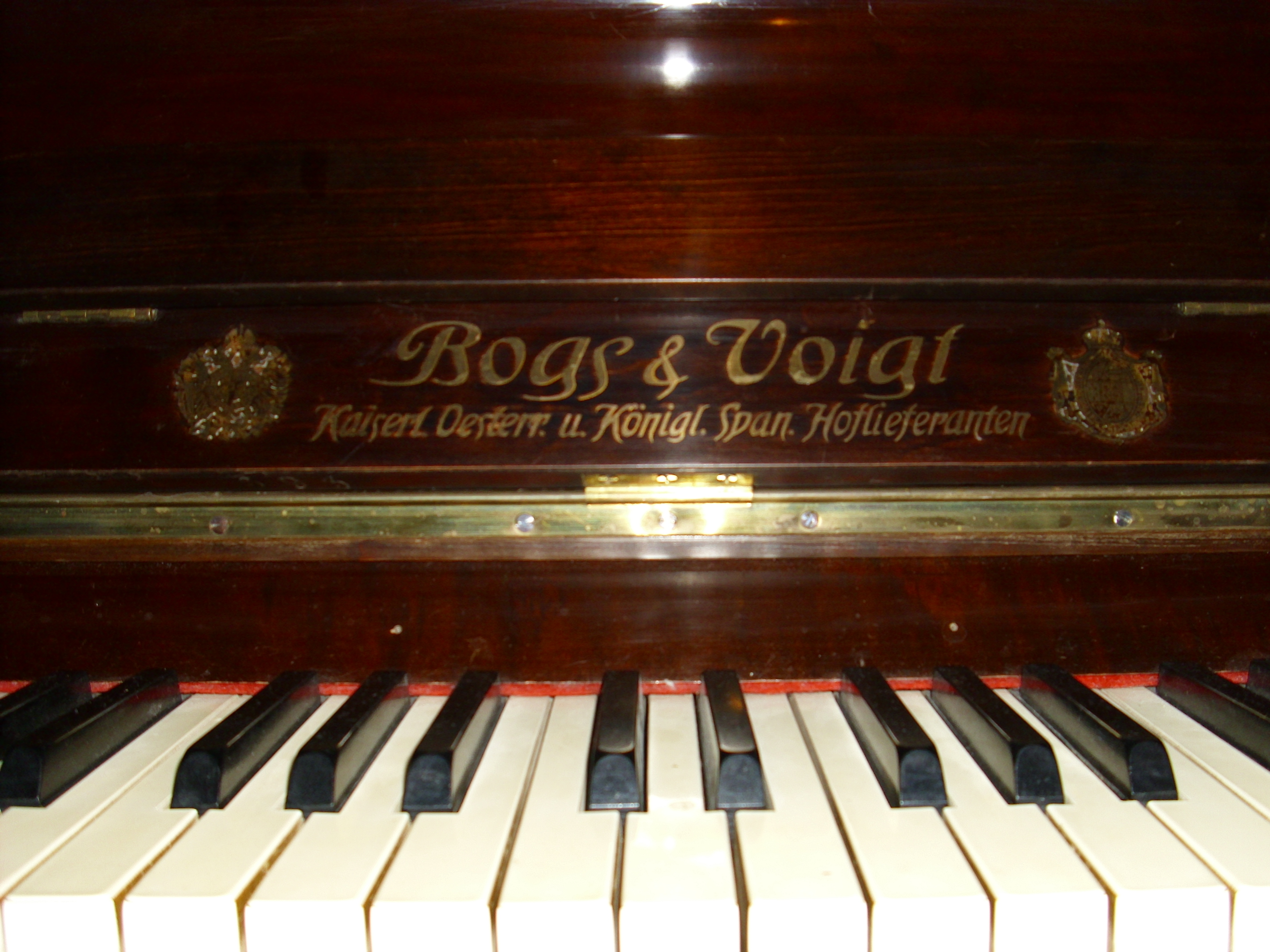
- Industry: Pianos
- Founded: Paul Richard Bogs and Adolf Ernst Voigt
- Headquarters: Berlin, Germany

Bogs & Voigt was a piano manufacturer in Berlin, Germany.

It was founded 1905 and existed up to 1939. The factory was located in 70 Warschauerstraße and 16a Boxhagenerstraße in Berlin. The owners Paul Richard Bogs (1871–1949) and Adolf Ernst Voigt were awarded an imperial and royal warrant of appointment to the courts of Austria-Hungary and Spain. Voigt left the company in 1913; Bogs continued working until the company was closed in 1939. The company built about 66,000 instruments.
