= Hazelton Brothers =

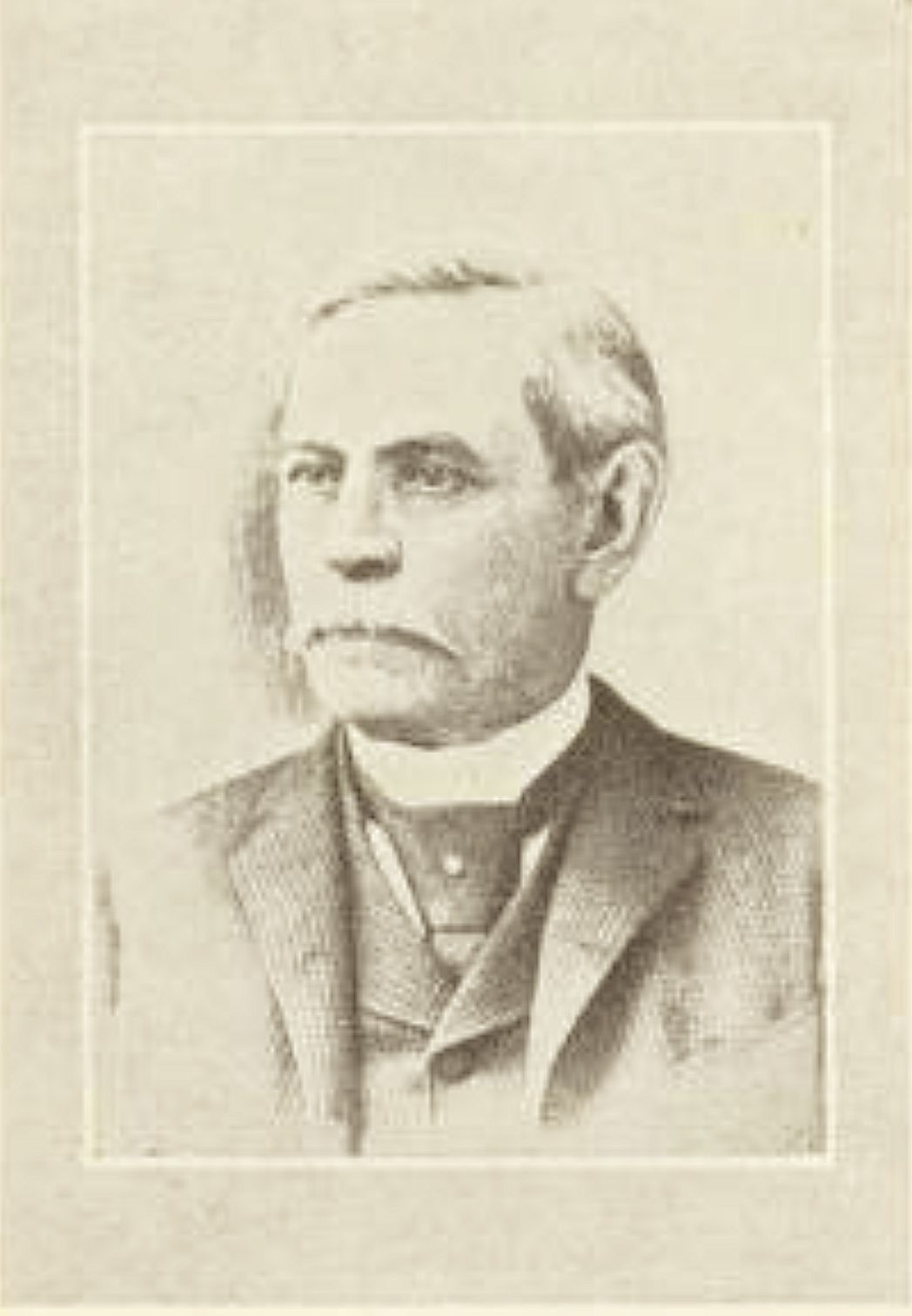
Henry Hazelton

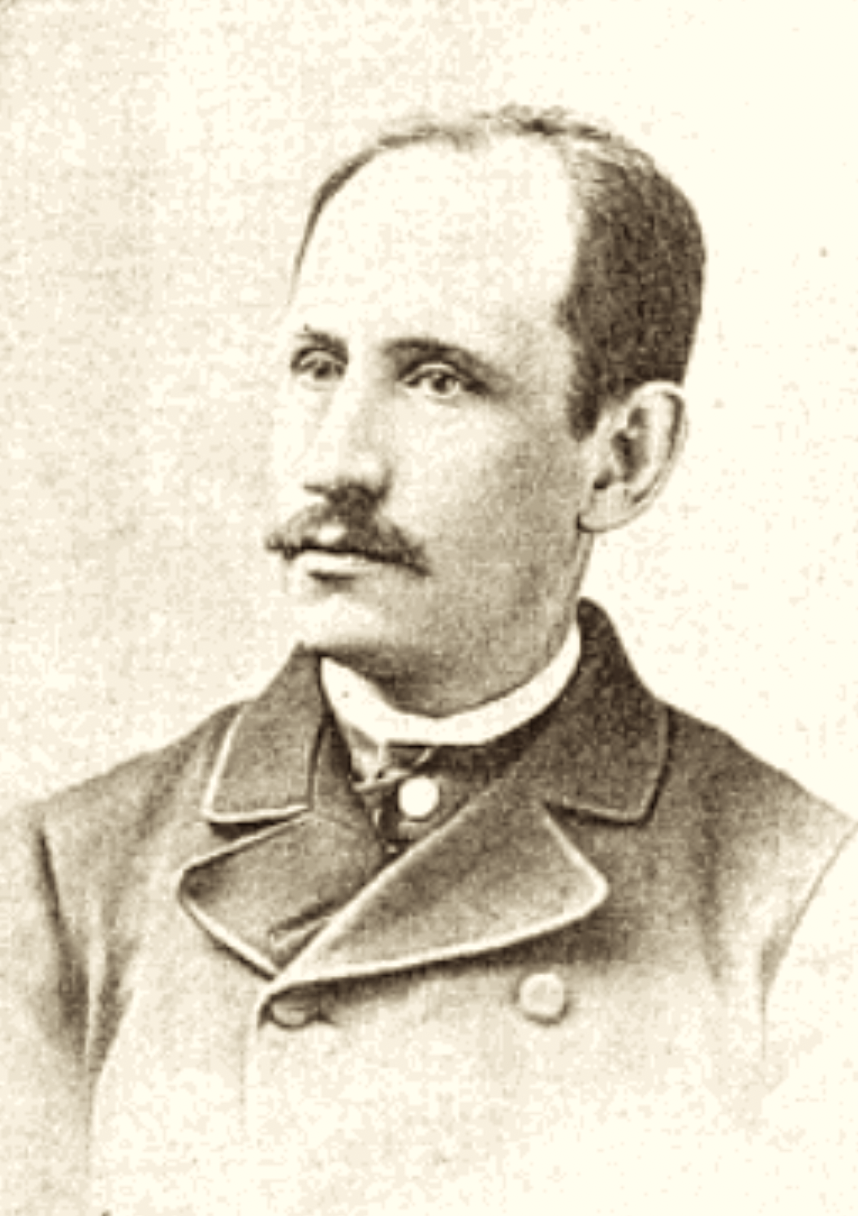
Samuel Hazelton

Hazelton Brothers was a piano manufacturing company in New York City that was active from 1850 until 1957 when it was sold to the Kohler & Campbell piano company. Kohler & Campbell continued to make pianos using the Hazelton Brothers name until 1985 when it sold to Samick of South Korea. Samick continues to make pianos using the Hazelton Brothers name.

== History ==
Hazelton Brothers (HB) was established in 1850 by Henry Hazelton (b. 1816) and his brothers, Frederick and John Hazelton. Henry Hazelton had previously worked for the Dubois & Stodart piano company where he had apprenticed as a piano maker from 1831 to 1838. In 1838 Henry joined the piano business of William Boardman in Albany, New York before establishing his own firm there, Hazelton, Lyon, & Talbot in 1840. Its possible Henry moved his business to New York City in 1841, although piano historian Nancy Groce raises questions on the historicity of this point.

HB was originally called F & H Hazelton when it was founded in 1850, with Frederick and Henry as senior partners. When John was promoted to senior partner its name became Hazelton Brothers in 1852. In the second half of the 19th century, HB made a wide range of square grand pianos, upright pianos and grand pianos. The quality of their pianos had a strong reputation, and, although a much smaller company, they were a direct competitor of Steinway & Sons in the higher end piano market. The company was a favorite among New York's aristocracy of the 19th century.

In 1855 HB made 2,000 pianos, and by 1869 the company was the 16th largest piano manufacturing company in the United States. The company was innovative in its designs, adopting progressive ideas for the period; among them the adoption of the cast-iron frame, and many improvements to stringing scales and action and case design. Because of the success of the HB brand, a number of knock-off competitors entered the market with deceptive trade names such as Hazeltine or Hazelman which were accused in The New York Times as "frauds".

Henry Hazelton retired from the business sometime in the 1880s at which point Frederick and John took over the business from their brother. In 1883 the New York City premises of the HB was destroyed in a fire, although the company had a second operational factory in Massachusetts at that time. Samuel Hazelton, the nephew of Henry, Frederick, and John, became a member of the firm in 1881. He took over the company following the retirement of his uncles. Samuel's son Halsey Hazelton also became a member of the firm and by 1908 had joined his father as a senior partner in running the company. In 1900 HB added player pianos to its growing number of products.

The Kohler & Campbell piano company purchased the organization in 1957, and continued to manufacture pianos using the Hazelton name until it was sold in 1985 to the Samick piano company of South Korea. Samick continues to make pianos using the Hazelton name. The Pierce Piano Atlas contains a list of HB pianos by serial number with the corresponding dates of their manufacturing; cataloguing the company's pianos made between the years 1858 and 1957.
