= Uebel & Lechleiter =

Uebel & Lechleiter Klaviere
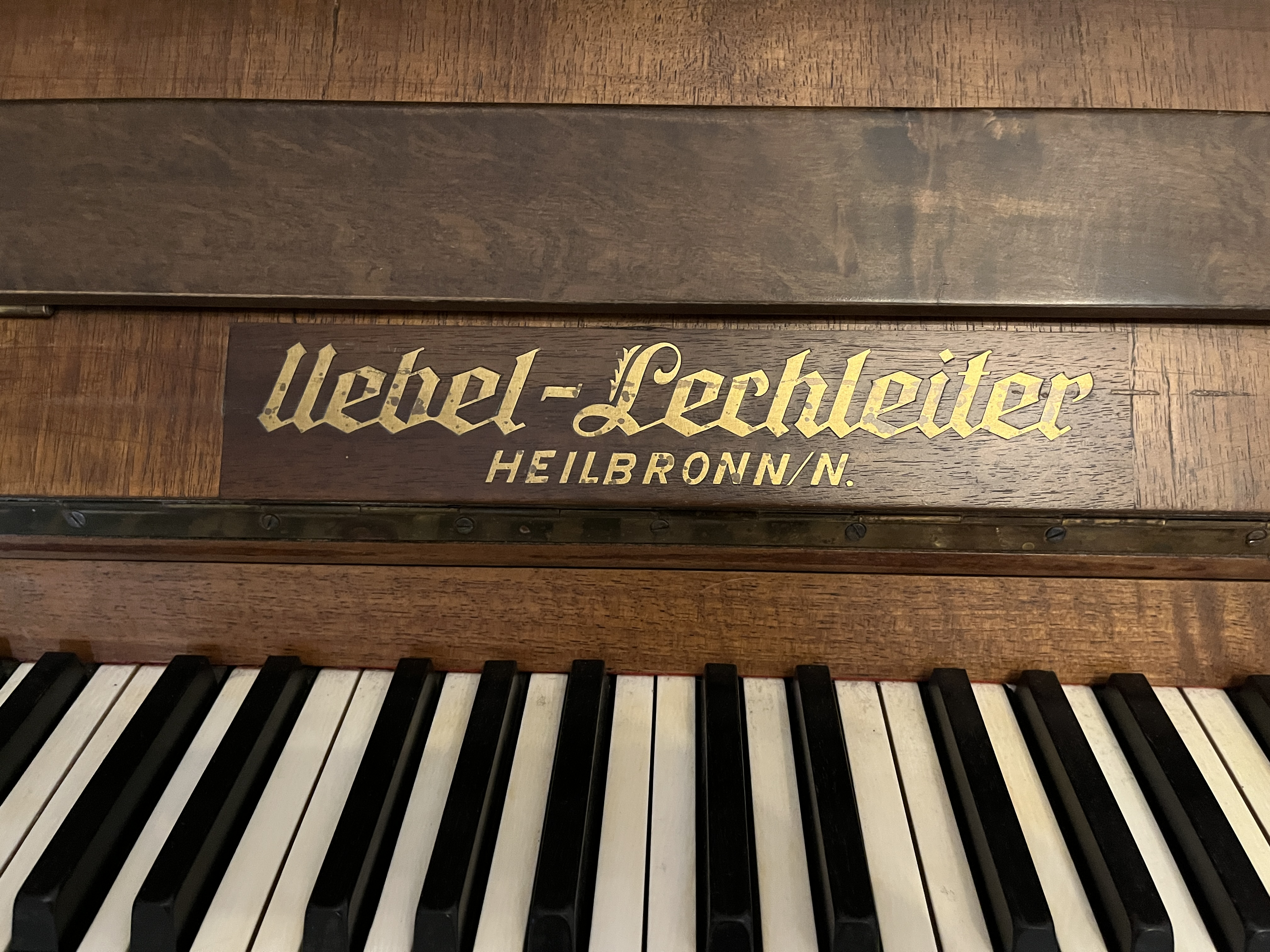
- Founded: April 23, 1872; 154 years ago in Heilbronn, Germany
- Founders: Carl Uebel; Paul Lechleiter
- Defunct: August 30, 1987
- Headquarters: Germany

Uebel & Lechleiter Klaviere was a German manufacturer of pianos founded by Carl Uebel and Paul Lechleiter. The company commenced manufacture on 23 April 1872 in Heilbronn and ceased production on 30 August 1987.

For many years Uebel & Lechleiter used to be the house company of the Catholic Church in Rome and it made special instruments for pope Pius X. It is therefore a company with a long history, which brought together European tradition and accurate production methods from Asia, resulting in distribution throughout the whole of Europe and the Near East.
