= Weber Piano Company =

Historical American piano manufacturer

- Type: Privately held company (1851–1995); Brand (1985–present)
- Industry: Musical instruments
- Founded: 1852
- Founder: Albert Weber, Sr.
- Fate: Brand name acquired by Young Chang in 1985
- Headquarters: United States
- Area served: Worldwide
- Products: Grand pianos Upright pianos Square pianos
- Parent: Young Chang

The Weber Piano Company is a former piano manufacturing company based in New York City and East Rochester, New York from the middle of the 19th century through the beginning of the 20th century, and continued as a division of Aeolian-American at East Rochester, New York until 1985, when Aeolian went out of business.

The Weber name was then sold to South Korean piano company Young Chang, which in turn sold the Weber name to Samsung Group in 1987. Young Chang remains responsible for manufacturing the pianos, which are sold in two product lines: Weber, with entry-level and mid-level pianos, and Albert Weber, with higher-level products.

== History ==
=== Weber Piano Company under Albert Weber Sr. ===
The Weber Piano Company was founded in 1852 by Albert Weber (born: July 8, 1829, Heiligenstadt, Bavaria; died: June 25, 1879, New York). Weber emigrated to the United States at the age of 16, and while his first intent was to support himself by teaching music and playing the organ, he soon was employed first as an apprentice of Charles J. Holder, a piano builder, and then as a piano builder by the D.J. Van Winkle piano company. During this time, Weber supplemented his income by giving music lessons in the evenings, and by playing the organ in churches on Sundays. In 1851, he set up a small piano business on West Broadway and White Street, in Manhattan. On October 1, 1851, Weber completed his first piano, working with two assistants, and by the beginning of 1852, they had completed five additional pianos. In 1852, Weber moved to a larger facility at 103 W. Broadway & 28 Jones Street.

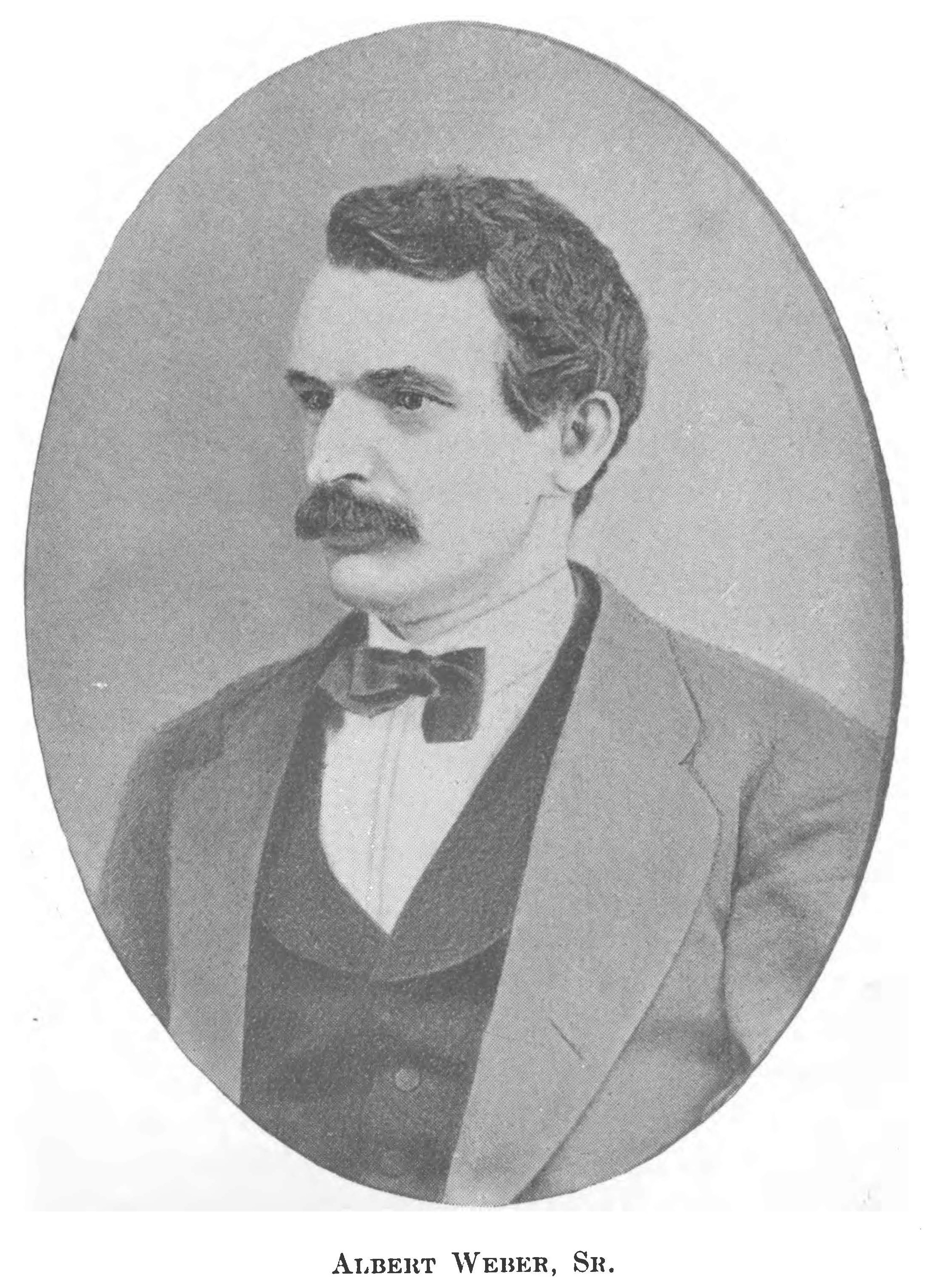
Albert Weber Sr. (1828–1879), pianist and founder of Weber Piano Co., New York (date unknown).

A fire destroyed Weber's Broadway workshop in 1854, but Weber stayed in the Manhattan area, moving to 103rd & 105 W. Broadway, and later to 155 W. Broadway. By 1864 Weber had achieved some success with the then-popular "square grand piano", and opened a larger factory nearby at 41 Wooster Street in Manhattan, and later expanded that facility several times. Between 1864 and 1869, Weber's pianos became popular in New York music circles. In 1869, Weber opened a large, luxurious showroom on 108 Fifth Avenue and 16th street in New York City. This was seen as a bold move by Weber's larger competitors, but it paid off, establishing the Weber brand as a premium product in the mind of customers. This new location became a "rendezvous of musical people" and Weber became wealthy. Weber's products were arguably some of the highest-quality pianos of their day, famous for fine materials and exacting attention to detail. Lacking a background in piano construction, Weber focused on proven methods of piano construction as opposed to innovative new ideas. Weber's pianos were also some of the most expensive of the day – the price of a Rococo Weber Grand Piano in 1874 was $1,400, approximately the cost of a large mansion.

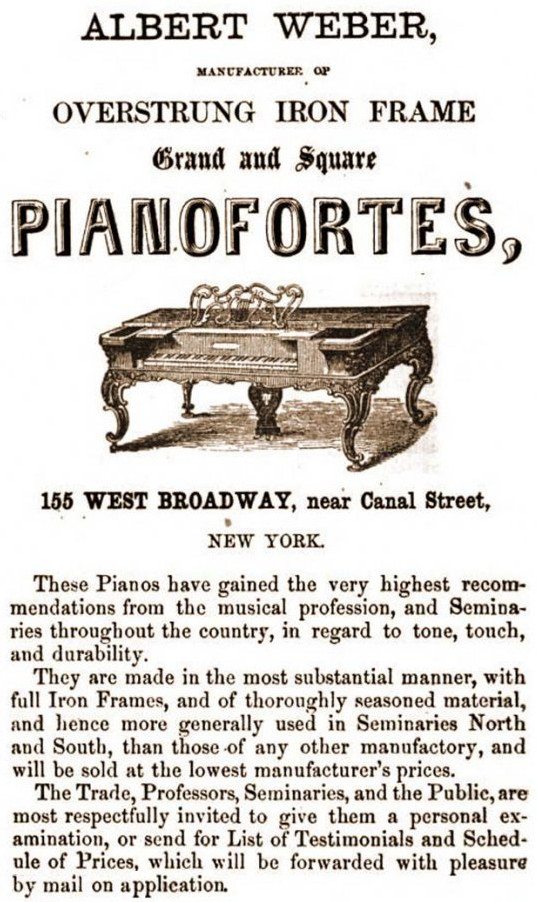
Weber Piano Fortes – 1860s Weber Square Piano Advertisement

As Weber's business grew, his pianos received recognition. The company received medals at the Philadelphia Worlds Fair (1876), the London World's Fair (1887) and the Paris World's Fair (1889). Weber also advertised his pianos aggressively, and is believed to have coined the term "Baby Grand" to describe a small grand piano. Weber was described as a skilled pianist, with genuine enthusiasm for music. He was well-educated and well-read, and was described as "a keen observer of men and things, [and] a most interesting entertainer". Weber was also a socialite, founding the Arcadian Club in New York, as well as being a member of the Manhattan Club, the Palette Club, the Arion Society, and the Liederkranz Society.

Albert Weber died relatively young, at the age of 50. Like many creative professionals, Weber was highly passionate about his work; however, this came at a cost to his health. He worked long hours, and also attended opera, theaters, and clubs at night. Described as having a "Bohemian" temperament, it may be that Weber's health failed due to his hard work and restlessness, or it may that he taxed his body with various vices such as smoking and drinking. According to his obituary, he was ill for nearly a year before he died, with the final nine weeks being serious enough to cause him to withdraw from his business.

At the time of his death, Weber lived at No. 32 West Nineteenth Street in New York, and his remains were interred at Green-Wood Cemetery. Weber's funeral was attended by over 300 employees, friends, and family. Weber's fortune, estimated at over $1 million (about $24 million in 2012 dollars), provided a comfortable living for his widow, Martha Weber (Maiden name: Martha Woodward), and his three children, Albert Weber Jr., Martha Weber, and Robina Weber.

Less than a year after Weber's death, however, a suit was brought against the estate by an alleged illegitimate child – Miss Josephine Todd – who claimed that she was Weber's daughter and that he had supported her throughout her life and had promised to name her in his will. Miss Todd asked for a settlement of $30,000 (about $702,983 in 2012 dollars.) The jury found in favor of Miss Todd, and a New York State appeals court affirmed the judgement for a total of $10,868 with interest from the time of Weber's death.

==== Competition with Steinway and Sons ====
Steinway & Sons, arguably one of today's most recognized piano manufacturers, was founded by German immigrant Heinrich Engelhard Steinweg in 1853, only a few years after Albert Weber founded his company.

The two businesses have many similarities. Both companies were founded by German immigrants, both started building primarily square pianos, both focused largely on high-quality, top-of-the-line instruments, and both companies were based in the lucrative piano market of New York City. During the latter half of the nineteenth century, Steinway and Weber competed closely. For example, in a New York Times piano buying guide in 1874 (which was possibly a paid advertisement), Steinway and Weber are the top two brands with the longest paragraphs. The article also includes other high-quality piano makers of the day, including Chickering, Knabe, and Decker Bros.

One example of Weber's ongoing feud with Steinway comes to light in the piano industry's attempts to reign in unauthorized, counterfeit pianos. By 1876, the piano was a popular home entertainment device, with sixty to seventy thousand pianos and organs being manufactured and sold in the United States per year. Many strong brands were established, and despite the protection of trademarks, many counterfeit pianos were also being produced with low-quality materials and sold at a deep discount.

Brand	Counterfeit Names Used
Chickering & Sons	"Chickring & Sons", "Chichering & Sons"
Decker Bros.	"Decker and Bros.", "Becker Bros."
Hazelton Bros.	"Hazeltine Bros.", "Hazelman & Co."
Mason & Hamlin	"Nason and Hammin"
Steinway & Sons	"Stanley & Sons", "Steinman & Sons", "Steinmetz & Sons", "Steinmay & Sons"
Weber	"Webber", "Weber & Co.", "Weber Scale"

In an attempt to curtail the trade in counterfeit pianos, representatives of sixty-five piano and organ manufacturers met to form the Piano, Organ, and Music Trade Association of New York on January 31, 1876. When voting for the directors of this group, an upset occurred when Joseph P. Hale and Albert Weber were elected as leaders. Albert Weber later wrote that all sixty-five firms voted openly, and the results were counted openly, but "the men who expected to get elected did not get votes enough!" Weber, an admirer of the American system of social mobility that had allowed him to rise so far in society, quipped: "The poorest is as much entitled to an office as the richest, if he gets the votes.

The election of Weber and Hale offended some of the largest piano and organ makers of the day, who sought to control this industry group. The representatives of Chickering, Decker Brothers, Mason & Hamlin, Steinway & Sons and some smaller piano and organ makers resigned from the group, forming their own Piano-forte and Organ Manufacturers' and Dealers' Protective Association of New-York.

The likely cause of the upset was that, with sixty-five companies present, the smaller piano companies controlled the majority of the votes and voted for those that they believed would represent the interests of smaller companies. Weber was seen as an upstart success story – someone who had risen rapidly from a sole proprietorship to one of the most prominent piano makers in New York, with lavish showrooms on Fifth Avenue and prominent endorsements. As far as Joseph P. Hale, he too had traveled a similar path, but focused on production efficiency and assembly-line work methods. His bold new ideas made him rich, made the piano more affordable for the middle class, and made him strongly disliked by his competitors. Both Weber and Hale could therefore be seen as credible threats to the larger and more established companies like Steinway.

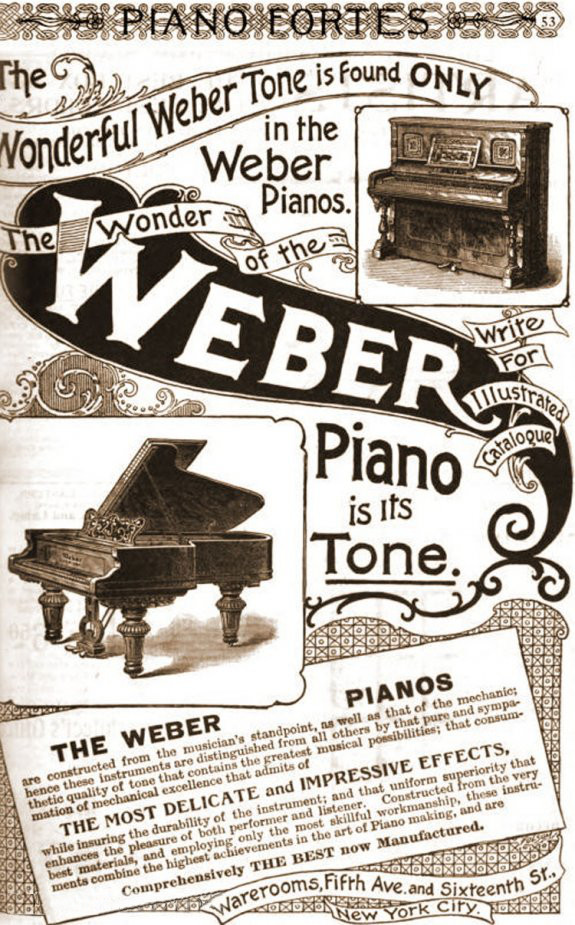
Weber Piano Advertisement 1890s

Weber, ever bold, did not believe that protection of an industry group was even necessary at all (even though he was elected to lead it), writing:

"About a month ago a society was projected. I did not believe in it. I had fought my way up to the top, felt secure in my position, and believed that each manufacturer would accomplish more by being untrammeled.... The name "Webber", with two "bs," "Weber & Co." "Weber Scale," had appeared on a number of bogus pianos, but I did not whine about it or hire a scurilous publication... to tell the world my griefs, as they did.... I found the place where the bogus "Webber" instruments were made, and put a stop to the work. Those of the bogus makers who proved obstinate I handed over to my attorneys... who speedily procured an injunction on the work and recovered judgement. The same law protects my neighbors' rights, and will act as effectually in their case as it did in mine."

Although Weber's boldness had benefited him, and allowed him to win many battles, Steinway & Sons ultimately won the war. Unlike Steinway, Weber focused his efforts on refining quality, materials and worksmanship rather than technological innovation. The key difference between the two founders (Albert Weber and Heinrich Steinweg) was that Weber had trained and studied as a pianist, and not as a businessman or piano builder. Steinweg, on the other hand, worked and trained primarily as a builder of a variety of instruments and not as a musician. As a builder first and foremost, Steinweg, and later his family members, discovered many technological innovations in piano construction and design that helped them versus against other piano builders. Further, Steinweg was better able to delegate control of his burgeoning empire to his family members, while Weber struggled with micro-management and had difficulty stepping back from the minutiae of day-to-day operations.

Weber Company's position against Steinway & Sons further weakened with Weber's relatively early death at the age of only 50. While Weber outlived his rival, his family was smaller and far less prolific than the Steinway family, and due to his tendency toward micro-management, Weber's death was a large loss to the company. Unlike Steinweg, Albert Weber's heir was a poor reflection of the original, and did damage to the Weber name.

=== Weber Piano Company under Albert Weber Jr. ===
In 1879, Albert Weber Jr. (born: 1858; died: 1908) succeeded his father as the head of Weber Piano Company after his father's death. Although Weber took control of the company at the age of only 21, his father had provided a formal education as well as training in piano-making.

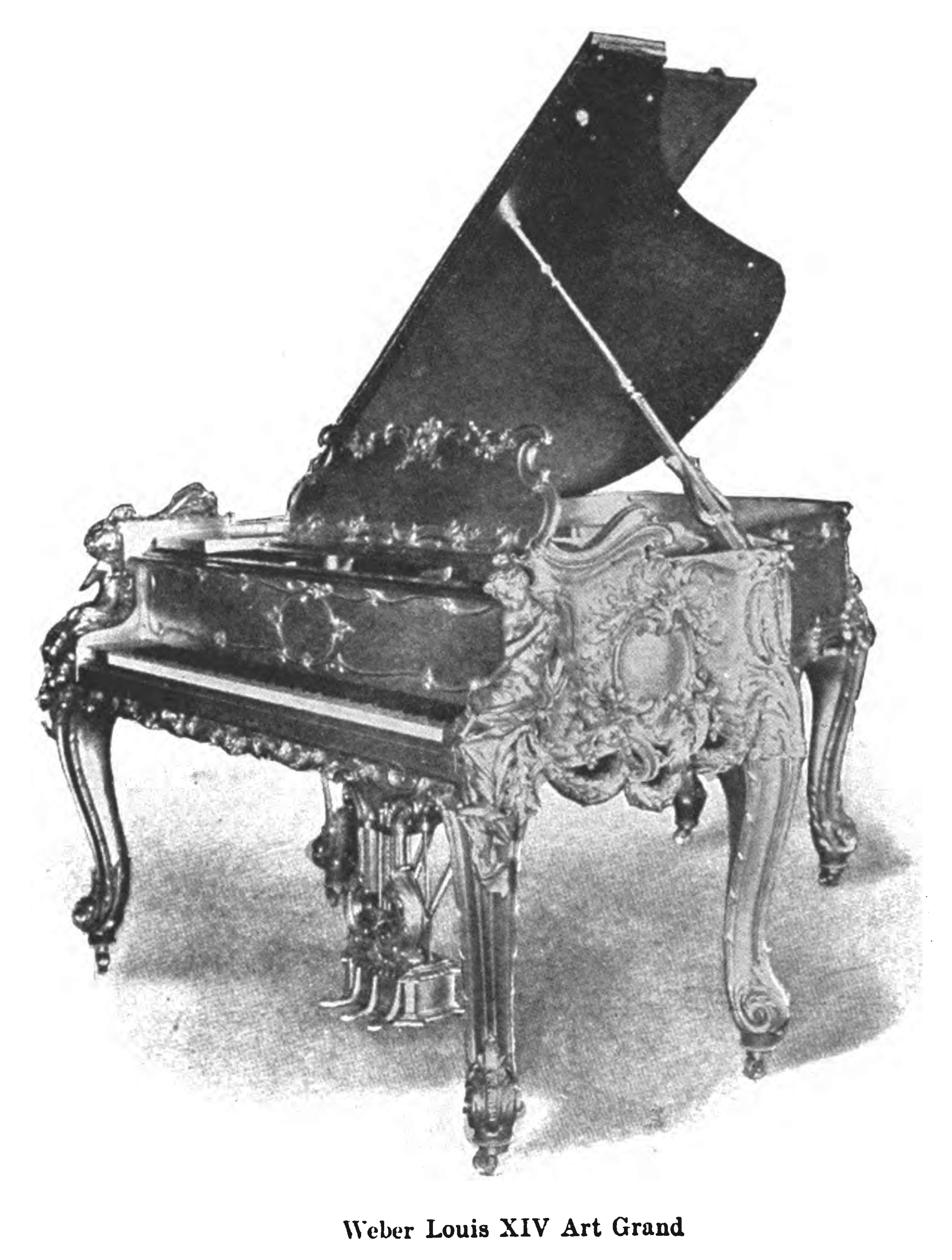
Weber Louis XIV Art Grand Piano, mid-to-late 19th century, designed by W.P. Stymus Jr.

Steeped in the piano industry from an early age, Weber Jr. became a skilled businessman, and continued improving production techniques and designs. Under his leadership, the company established the first Weber showroom in Chicago in 1880, and built a larger version in 1883, the Weber Concert Hall. In 1890, Weber again expanded in Chicago, opening a large showroom at 248 Wabash Avenue. Throughout the 1880s, Weber continued to expand in the American South and West, and in 1887, Weber opened a factory in England.

In 1867, during Albert Weber Sr.'s management, the company established a large factory located at 119 7th Avenue & 17th Street, about two blocks away from the company's main showroom on 5th Avenue and 16th Street. By 1890, under the management of Albert Weber Jr., this factory had expanded to a street frontage of 400 feet, a depth of 40 feet, and six stories in height.

However, having grown up in wealth, Albert Weber Jr. did not quite measure up to his father's savvy business management or personal skills. He incurred many debts, having personal financial troubles as early as 1883 that required his father's estate to provide the funds to rescue him. Weber incurred these debts due to his "playboy" style of living as a socialite and "well-known man about town" by spending money on women, gambling, and speculative investments. His first marriage, in June 1881, to the daughter of a prominent Manhattan dentist, was dissolved in November 1884, and seven months later he married the "charming soubrette" Irene Perry to whom he was serially unfaithful. In 1883 he was accused by his creditors of having pianos removed from his Fifth Avenue showrooms and stored in other locations around the city to "cheat and defraud his creditors".

According to one documented court proceeding in 1894, where Weber Jr. was being prosecuted for failing to pay a debt of $300 despite a large salary and having received $50,000 in cash and $200,000 in shares when his company went public, Weber Jr. was involved in the following: furnishing an extravagant apartment for the burlesque performer and "last word in female magnificence" Nina Farrington, who had overspent the amount he had guaranteed the store Hilton, Hughes & Co; failing to pay Hilton, Hughes & Co. any of the money he had guaranteed, prompting a lawsuit; being obligated to pay alimony to his first wife; frequenting illegal poker and gambling establishments; being present in a gambling house when it was raided by police; and guaranteeing money to others when he knew that he was, in fact, insolvent. In the 1894 court proceeding, Weber Jr. admitted that he had been sued "about seventy-five times" for failing to pay his debts.

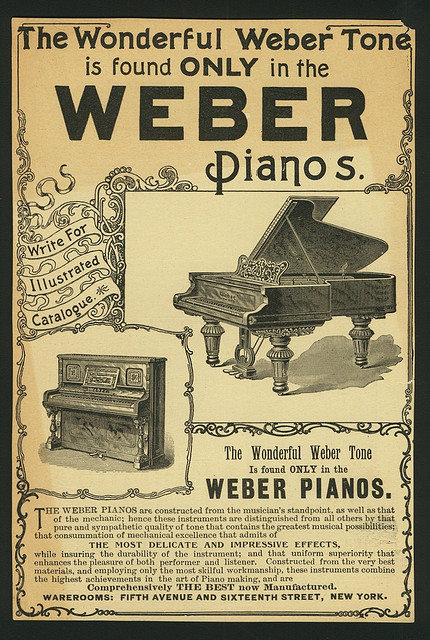
1896 Weber Piano Advertisement

Lacking the business focus of Albert Weber Sr., but not his energy and zest for life, Weber Jr. was also known as something of a hothead and even spent a night in jail for assault. This 1896 assault charge, when Weber Jr. was 38 years old, gives some insight into his character, with the magistrate remarking "You had no right to call this man names, and you also had no right to flourish a loaded revolver in that dangerous manner. I fine you $5." Unfortunately for Weber, the only thing in his pockets was a bean shooter, so he spent the night in jail as he failed to produce the necessary $5. This incident occurred at the Weber Company's showrooms on Fifth Avenue in September 1896. Only a few weeks later, Weber had a mental breakdown that required he be taken to Bellevue Hospital's insane pavilion, although this may have been an attempt to escape from his creditors. His second wife, Irene Perry, had divorced him in April that year.

Despite his wild style of living, Weber Jr. also furnished the foundation many dramatic and literary publications in New York, and did oversee the expansion of the Weber Piano Company for many years. Like his father, Albert Weber Jr. lived only 50 years, dying October 16, 1908 in McIntosh, Florida. Weber retired from the piano-making business to seek his health (or possibly escape his creditors) in Florida, but contracted malaria there, which killed him.

==== Endorsements ====
Weber Jr. continued the aggressive advertising practices of his father, including traditional advertising, "World's Fair"-type judging competitions, securing the endorsements of celebrities and royalty, and exhibition by well-known pianists in large cities. Weber received the endorsements of pianists such as Madeline Schiller, Constantin Ivanovich von Sternberg, Moriz Rosenthal and August Wilhelmj, as well as opera conductor Colonel James Mapleson. In 1887, the eleven-year-old prodigy Josef Hofmann toured America for the first time, playing a Weber piano (Hofmann would later endorse Steinway).

Weber pianos were also played and endorsed by Polish pianist (and later Prime Minister) Ignaz Paderewski after he had a quarrel with Steinway & Sons, as well as the King of Spain Alfonso XIII, Pope Pius X and Pope Pius XI, the latter of whom designated the Weber Piano as the official piano of the Vatican. Other royal families, including those of England, Wales, France, Italy, Belgium, and Sweden also selected the Weber Piano as their official piano, including Queen Elizabeth II of Great Britain, Wilhelm II of Germany.

=== Weber Piano Company under William E. Wheelock ===
In 1892, the Weber company was taken over by William E. Wheelock (1852–?), Charles B. Lawson (1855–?), and John W. Mason (1842–1919). The company was renamed the Weber-Wheelock Company and public stock was issued the following year.

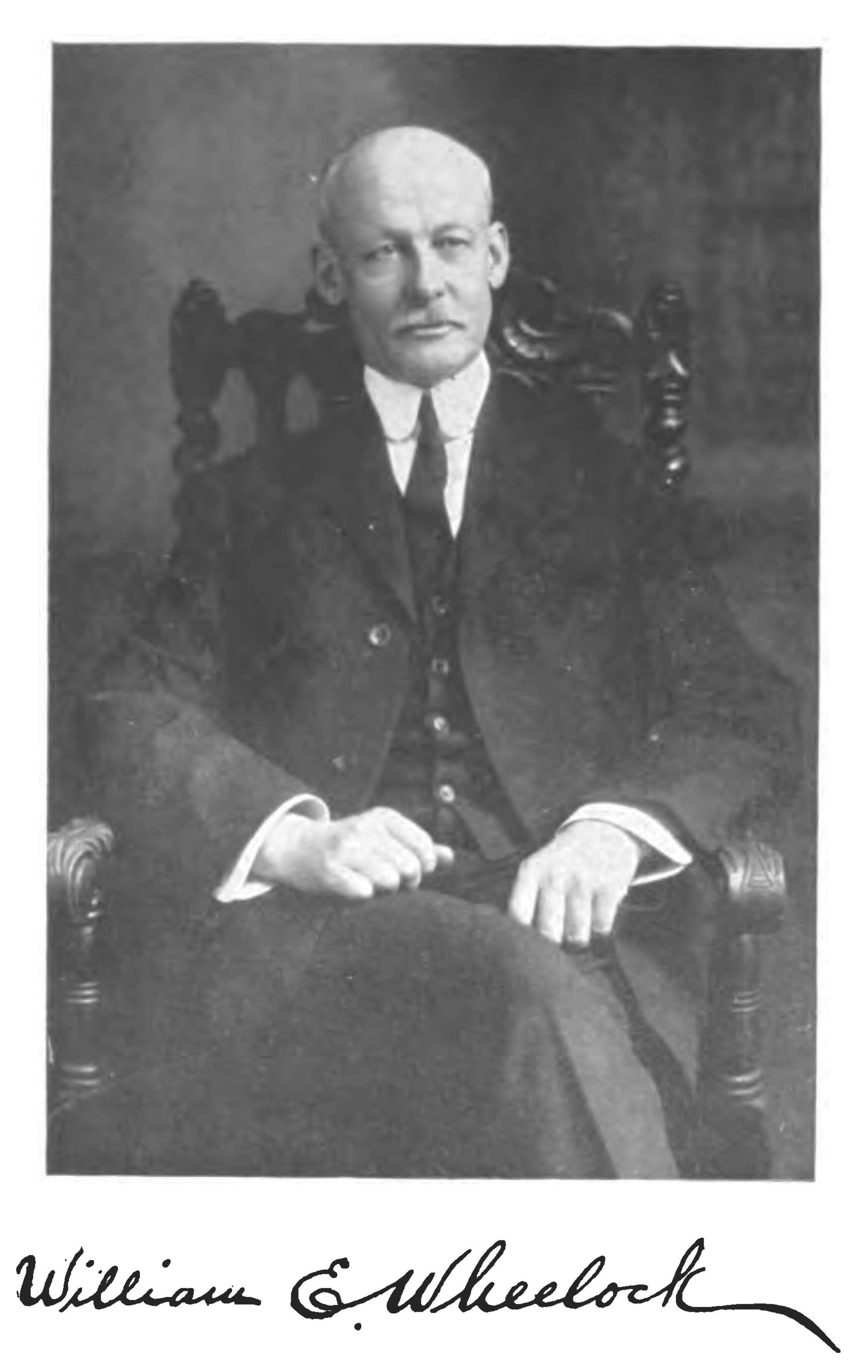
Photograph of William E. Wheelock (1852–1926), piano businessman and founder of Wheelock & Company.

Wheelock began manufacturing pianos in 1873, and founded William E. Wheelock & Company in 1877, with operations in New York City. Wheelock was a successful businessman, and expanded his operations in New York several times. Wheelock's partner since 1880, Charles B. Lawson, helped Wheelock succeed in becoming a reputable and established piano maker in New York City. After the Weber-Wheelock merger, Lawson helped manage Weber as vice president until 1906, when he launched his own firm, Lawson and Company, manufacturing the Lawson piano.

Following Wheelock's merger with Weber, the company was organized into three separate divisions, with three separate factories: the Weber Piano, the highest quality, made in the Weber factory; the Wheelock piano, a good-quality instrument made in the Wheelock factory; and the Stuyvesant, a medium-priced piano line, which Wheelock had introduced in 1886. In 1896, in the depths of the economic depression known as the Panic of 1893, the Weber-Wheelock Company almost went out of business, but managed to survive despite declaring bankruptcy.

=== Weber Piano Company under Aeolian ===
The Aeolian, Weber Piano & Pianola Company was founded in 1903 as a merger of the existing Aeolian Company and the Weber-Wheelock Company. Wheelock became Treasurer of the new company, and retained his position as president of Weber, Wheelock, and Stuyvesant companies.

Following the merger with Weber, the newly created company controlled several subsidiaries: The Aeolian Company (London), The Choralion Company (Berlin), The Aeolian Company, Ltd. (Paris), The Pianola Company Proprietary, Ltd. (Melbourne and Sydney), The Weber Piano Company (New York and London), George Steck & Company, Wheelock Piano Company, Stuyvesant Piano Company, Chilton Piano Company, Technola Piano Company, Votey Organ company, Vocalian Organ Company, and the Universal Music Company (a maker of rolls for player pianos). This new company become one of the largest piano companies of the day, with about 5,000 employees, multiple factories, and total capital of about $15.5 million.

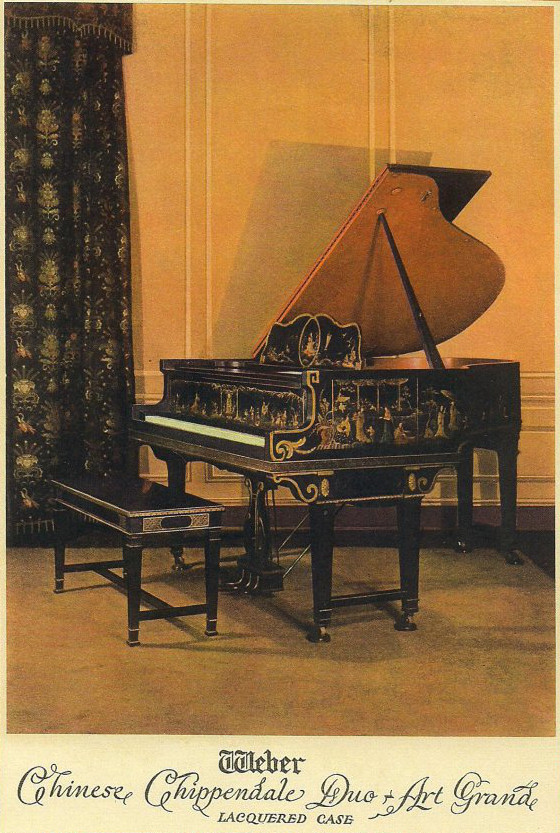
Weber Piano – Chinese Chippendale Duo-Art Grand with Lacquered Case, Circa 1920s

In 1932, after the merger of Aeolian with the American Piano Company, Weber Piano Company signed a brand management contract with the new company to operate as the exclusive flagship brand of what was then the world's largest piano company. While Weber maintained a high-quality focus, Aeolian-American's piano sales slumped during the Great Depression, and the company struggled, culminating the company's CEO William H. Alfring committing suicide in 1937 by jumping in front of a New York City passenger train.

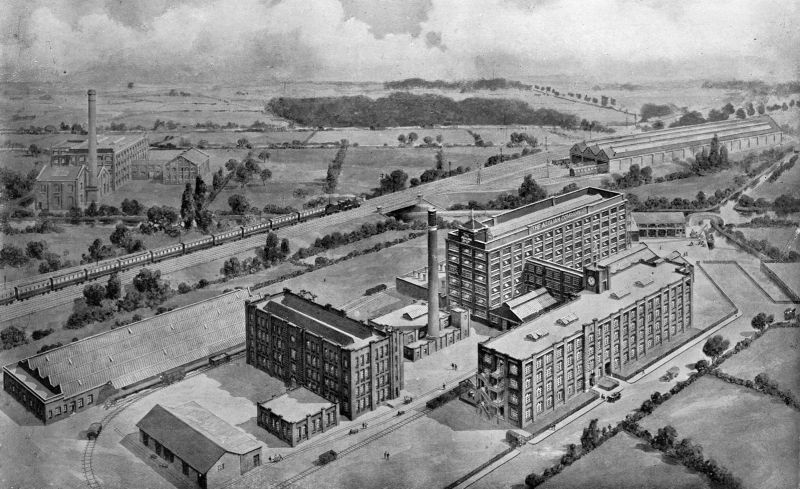
Aeolian Factory at Hayes, Middlesex, England c1920

The Aeolian-American Company collapsed in bankruptcy in 1985, after navigating the decades-long waning popularity of the piano as a home entertainment device in favor of the radio and then the television. During that time, the Weber name continued to be a top-quality brand in Aeolian's lineup.

=== Weber Piano Company – Sale to Young Chang ===
Following the Aeolian bankruptcy, the company's assets were sold off. The Weber name was sold to Korean piano company Young Chang, which in turn sold the Weber name to Samsung Group in 1987. Young Chang itself was purchased by Hyundai Development Company in 2006.

== Weber Pianos Today ==
Instruments built by Young Chang today are modern designs, and have little in common with the original nineteenth-century Weber designs, which would be considered dated today, especially considering efficiency of manufacturing.

Young Chang remains responsible for manufacturing Weber pianos, which are sold in two product lines: Weber, with entry-level and mid-level pianos, and Albert Weber, a high-quality line of pianos.

Albert Weber pianos are premium instruments, and are some of the best pianos made by Young Chang. Beginning in 1995, the Albert Weber line was designed by an international team under the auspices of Joseph Pramberger, who was formerly the Vice President of Manufacturing for Steinway & Sons. Pramberger died in 2003, but Young Chang has retained the rights to his designs.

Today's Albert Weber instruments are manufactured in South Korea on a separate production line from other Young Chang instruments, using parts from the Americas, Europe and Asia. The pianos have a solid AAA Alaskan Sitka spruce soundboard, Renner Blue hammers, Renner action, and Roslau strings. The Albert Weber pianos differ from similar-sized Young Chang pianos in that they use better-quality materials and have lower tension strings and softer hammers, both of which contribute to a "warmer" sound that is more reminiscent of the warm "Weber Tone" that Weber advertised heavily in the late nineteenth century. Albert Weber pianos also carry a longer warranty (fifteen years) than their Young Chang and Weber counterparts (ten years).

Today's Weber pianos are entry-level and mid-level instruments, and are more affordable than the Albert Weber line. In general, these pianos are similar to their Young Chang counterparts in all but the name. This similarity is because, in 2008, Young Chang hired American piano designer Delwin D. Fandrich to redesign their product lines, including both the Weber and Young Chang piano lines. From 2013, both Albert Weber and Weber are made by Hyundai Development Company as Premium Edition models.

=== Weber Piano Models ===
==== Summary of Grand Piano Models ====
Brand	Model Number and Description	Length (feet, inches)	MSRP as of March 2013
Albert Weber	AW51 Conservatory Artist Grand	5'1"	?
Albert Weber	AW57 Regal Artist Grand	5'9"	?
Albert Weber	AW60/AW185 Conservatory Artist Grand	6'1"	$35,097 – 36,717
Albert Weber	AW69/AW208 Semi-Concert Artist Grand	6'10"	$45,357 – 47,517
Albert Weber	AW76/AW228 Semi-Concert Artist Grand	7'6"	$63,717 – 65,877
Albert Weber	AW90/AW275 Concert Artist Grand	9'0"	$113,397
Weber	W150 Classic Grand / Baby Grand	4'11"	$15,643 – 17,782
Weber	W157 Classic Grand / Baby Grand	5'2"	$17,939 – 18,632
Weber	W175 Classic Grand / Baby Grand	5'9"	$19,489 – 20,330
Weber	W185 Classic Grand / Baby Grand	6'1"	$22,727 – 23,748

==== Summary of Upright Piano Models ====
Brand	Model Number and Description	Length (feet, inches)	MSRP as of March 2013
Albert Weber	AW48/AW121 Professional Upright	4'0"	$10,797 – 12,147
Albert Weber	AW49 Professional Upright	4'1"	?
Albert Weber	AW52/And W131 Professional Upright	4'4"	$13,335 – $14,577
Weber	W112 Contemporary Console	3'8"	?
Weber	W112F Designer Console	3'8"	?
Weber	W114 Contemporary Console	3'9"	$6,246 – 7,606
Weber	W116 Studio Upright	3'10.5"	?
Weber	W121 Professional Upright	4'0"	$6,905 – 7,968
Weber	W131 Professional Upright	4'4"	$7,564 – 7,894

== Serial Numbers ==
Historical serial numbers and approximate date of manufacture for Weber (New York) Pianos:

Year	Serial number	Average annual growth in units over previous five years
1860	#1900	
1865	#3000	9.57%
1870	#6000	14.87%
1875	#10000	10.76%
1880	#16300	10.26%
1885	#27900	11.35%
1890	#32000	2.78%
1895	#41000	5.08%
1900	#49400	3.80%
1905	#57000	2.90%
1910	#64500	2.50%
1915	#71900	2.20%
1920	#76000	1.12%
1925	#78900	0.75%
1930	#81300	0.60%
1935	#86000	1.13%
1940	#90700	1.07%
1945	#94000	0.72%
1950	#94600	0.13%
1955	#95400	0.17%
1960	#96850	0.30%
1965	#99100	0.46%
1970	#100082	0.20%

== See also ==
- List of piano makers
- List of piano brand names
- Aeolian Company
- Young Chang
- Steinway & Sons
- Chickering and Sons
- Wm. Knabe & Co.
- Decker Brothers
