= Gerrie Naughton =

Roman Catholic nun and founder of ARISE Adelante (1942–2009)

Sister Gerrie Naughton RSM
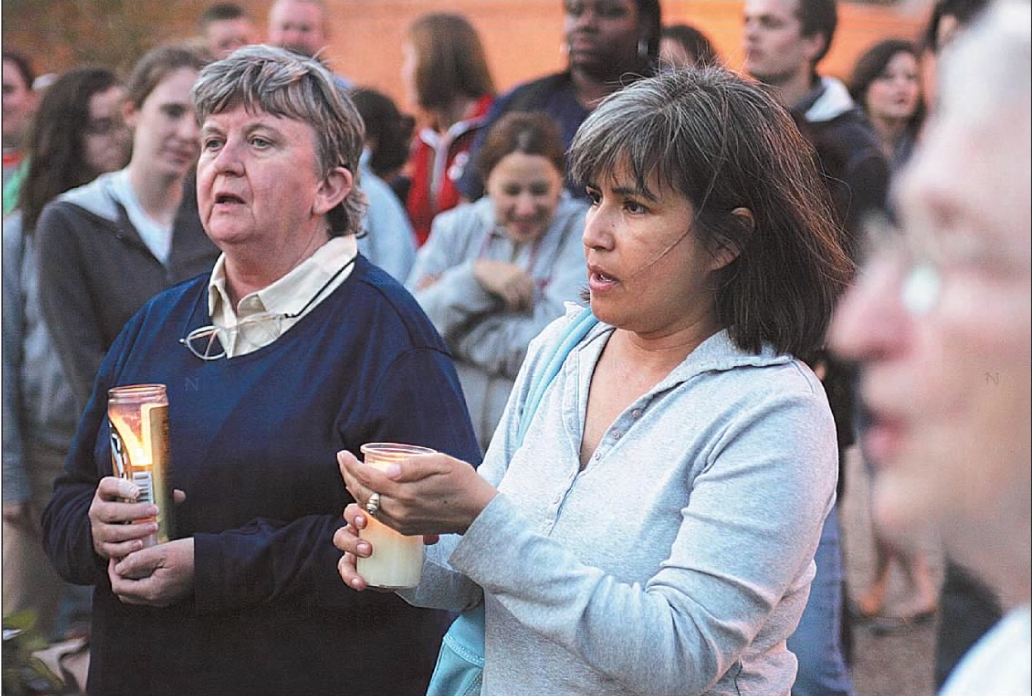
- Sr. Naughton (left) singing at a protest in McAllen, Texas, January 2007.

Personal life
- Born: April 26, 1942 Roscommon, Ireland
- Died: October 29, 2009 (aged 67) McAllen, Texas, United States

Religious life
- Religion: Roman Catholic
- Order: Sisters of Mercy

Catherine "Gerrie" Naughton (1942–2009) was a Roman Catholic nun of the Sisters of Mercy (RSM). In 1987 she founded ARISE Adelante to serve people, mostly women and children, living in the unincorporated colonias (low-income, informal communities sometimes called slums) of the Rio Grande Valley. Members of ARISE receive assistance for a period of time but then must volunteer back to the community in a distributive leadership model. Naughton's motto was "ARISE does not do for the people what the people can do for themselves."

== Early life and education ==
Naughton was born in 1942 in County Roscommon, Ireland. Her parents were Mary Fallon Naughton and Patrick Naughton. She decided to immigrate to the United States when a priest from visited her high school to talk about the need for missionaries in Mississippi. She came to the United States at age 17 in 1959, giving her address as the Convent of Mercy in St. Louis, Missouri. She earned a bachelor's degree in chemistry and mathematics.

== Work as a teacher in Louisiana and Mississippi ==
Between 1960 and 1978 she taught high school science and math in Louisiana and Mississippi. From 1978 to 1983 she worked in Meridian, Mississippi as Director of Religious Education at Saint Patrick's Catholic Church, but left to seek more direct outreach. She moved to Hattiesburg, Mississippi in August 1983 to work at Sacred Heart Catholic Church as a pastoral assistant for Monsignor John Scanlon, making 20 home visits a week to work her way through a roster of 800 families, thus receiving important preparation for her future career-defining work in Texas. She was known for casual dress, an informal style, and a keen interest in meeting people in their homes and learning about their needs. She was also a competitive runner, participating in the Crescent City Classic in New Orleans, and the Coca-Cola Classic in Hattiesburg, both in 1984, finishing second in the latter. She was the Red Carpet Run female master's champion in 1984.

== Texas and ARISE ==
In the 1980s the Sisters of Mercy asked their communities to prepare for Hispanic ministries, so she studied Spanish at the Mexican American Cultural Center in San Antonio for a year. In 1987 she moved to the Rio Grande Valley, where sisters from her congregation had served for over a century. She chose Las Milpas, a rural area of about 12,000 people in the town of Pharr, Texas. Its name means "the cornfields" in Spanish. She and Ramona Casas met regularly at Casas's home for prayer, and formed a group. Casas, today a senior leader at ARISE, described Naughton's distinctive style of going door to door in the colonias as she had back in Mississippi, this time on a bicycle. Casas told The Monitor, "The first time I met her, I remember thinking, `What is this nun doing on a bicycle?' It was the first time I had ever seen a nun not wearing a habit. After that, I thought all nuns in the United States wore shorts and used bicycles."

After four years of offering English classes to over 450 people seeking amnesty under the Regan Administration's Immigration and Reform Act, in 1991 Naughton, Casas, and their team sought funding from city commissioners for a center, which they granted by giving her a five-year lease for inexpensive property owned by the city. Gradually more money came in from the Conrad N. Hilton Foundation, the Scanlon Foundation, and other sources, and the program began receiving VISTA volunteers. Executive Director Lourdes Flores immigrated from Mexico at age 12, and was hired at ARISE out of high school, initially teaching English to women in the colonias.

== Honors ==
Naughton was emphatic that the women of ARISE deserved recognition, and that they should be credited directly rather than giving sole credit to her or to the major organizations that supported them. In 1995 at the age of 53 Naughton won the Regina Cunningham Award from Mercy Action, Inc., the highest honor of the Sisters of Mercy. In 2015 a secular group, the Building Community Workshop of Dallas, added her to its roster of trading cards honoring heroes of the Rio Grande Valley. ARISE gives the Gerrie Naughton Award annually in her honor.
