= Tacoma Guitars =

American musical instrument manufacturer (1991–2008)

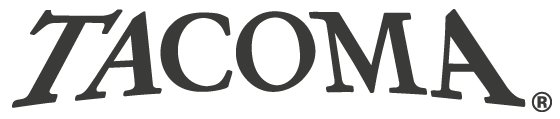
- Type: Subsidiary
- Industry: Musical instruments
- Founded: 1991
- Founder: Young Chang
- Defunct: 2008; 18 years ago
- Fate: Company acquired by Fender in 2004, ceased production in 2008
- Area served: Worldwide
- Products: Acoustic and classical guitars, basses, mandolins
- Parent: Young Chang (1991–2004); Fender (2004–08)

Tacoma Guitars was an American manufacturing company of musical instruments. It was founded in 1991 as a division of South Korean company Young Chang. Instruments were manufactured in Tacoma, Washington. The company and brand name were acquired by the Fender Musical Instruments Corporation in 2004. The Tacoma plant closed, and production ceased, in 2008.

Tacoma manufactured mainly acoustic guitars, although its product range extended to basses and mandolins.

== History ==
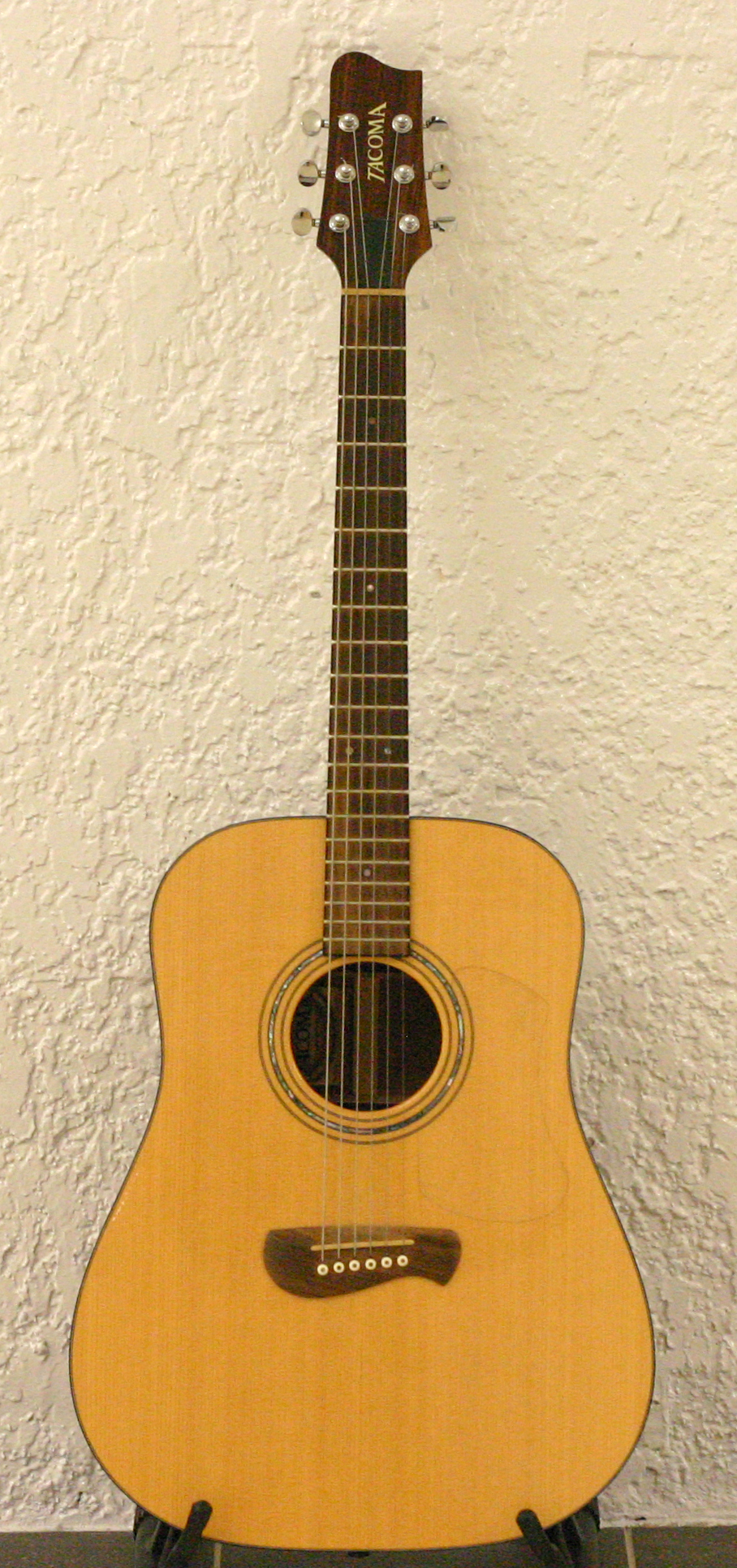
A guitar by Tacoma

Tacoma Guitars began as a division of Young Chang America in Tacoma, Washington that, starting in 1991, processed Northwest hardwood for export for piano soundboards. Sawmill general manager J. C. Kim persuaded Young Chang to build a guitar manufacturing plant nearby. For the first few years, the plant produced about 100 guitars a month for another guitar brand. In 1997, the Papoose and Chief models debuted at the 1997 winter Convention of the National Association of Musical Manufacturers (NAMM). That year, mass production of the unconventional Papoose model, the first sold under the Tacoma brand, also began.

Tacoma subsequently developed ranges of guitars—some with conventional round sound holes, others with the paisley sound hole introduced on the Papoose (as the Wing Series). A recession in the Asian economy caused by the Avian Flu epidemic prompted Young Chang to sell the division to Kim in 1999.

Sometime in the late 1990s, the budget brand Olympia started. They sold budget guitars at low prices. Models were made in Indonesia and China.

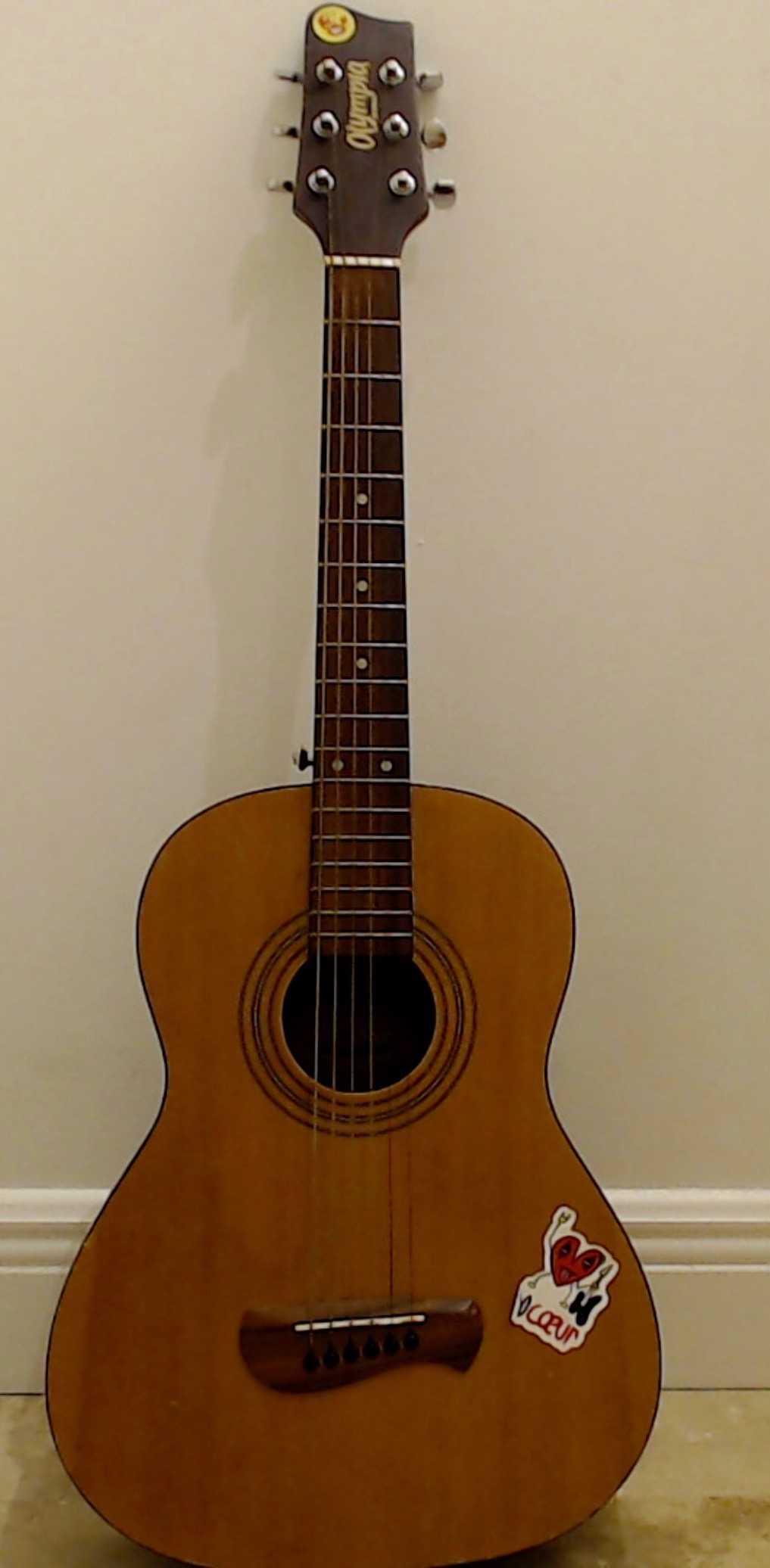
A parlor guitar from the budget brand Olympia

Fender Musical Instruments Corporation purchased the company in October 2004 for a price estimated between $2 million and $4 million and made it a division of Fender. In 2008, Fender announced it would close the 44,000 square foot Frederickson plant and lay off 70 employees, intending to move Tacoma production to existing Fender factories in Connecticut to take advantage of economies of scale. When the move was announced, former Tacoma Guitars CEO Ferdinand Boyce suggested that Fender's decision to close the plant was motivated in part by a desire to automate the Tacoma manufacturing process to cut costs. Fender never resumed production of Tacoma guitars.

== Design features ==
Tacoma incorporated unusual features in many of its guitars—notably, paisley-shaped soundholes and bolt-on necks.

=== Paisley soundhole ===
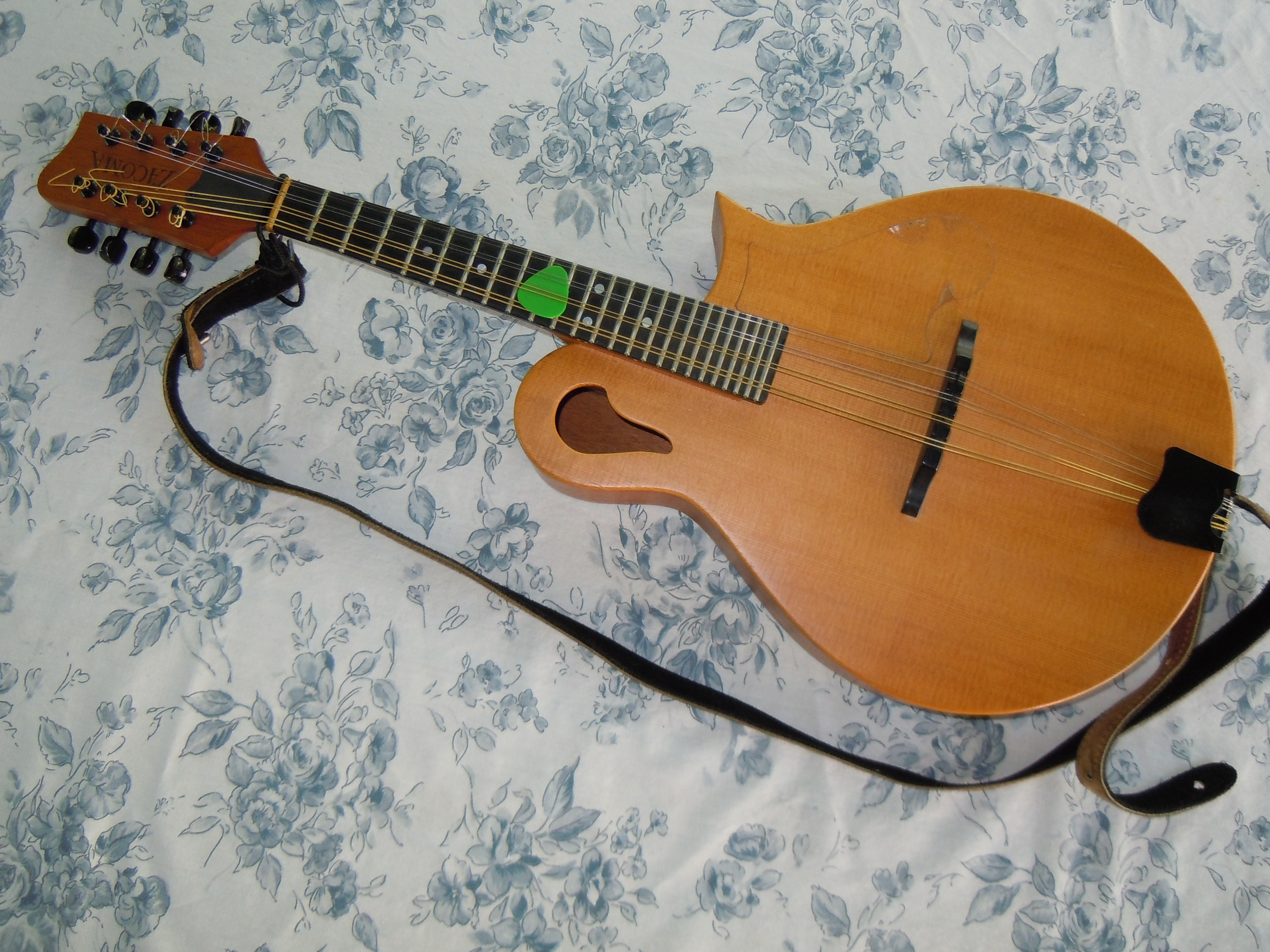
Tacoma M1 mandolin with paisley sound hole on the upper bout.

Several of Tacoma's models featured an unusual sound hole shape, a paisley soundhole, on the left side of the upper bout designed by world famous Luthier George Gruhn. George's idea was that moving the sound hole to a relatively low-stress part of the top would increase top strength, reduce bracing, and make the top more resonant. Tacoma called guitars that use the paisley soundhole the Wing Series.

=== Voiced bracing support ===
Tacoma guitars used their Voiced Bracing Support system to various extents. Their theory behind the system was to minimize bracing to what it needs to remain stable, such that the tone of the guitar is sacrificed as little as possible.

They applied the full extent of this philosophy to the Wing Series guitars, which used A-frame bracing instead of the more traditional X-frame bracing of conventional acoustics. Tacoma used a modification of the traditional X-frame bracing on their models with conventional sound holes. They placed two cross-braces on the outside of the X, which they said improves sound hole stability and rigidity, while leaving the edges more flexible and resonant. Tacoma contoured braces so they were thinner but wider near the edges of the top, and thicker but narrower near the center of the top.

=== Bridge ===
Tacoma used asymmetrically shaped braces, which they said improves the response of each string. The bridge is curved, rather than flat, and has no sharp edges. Tacoma said this improves transmission of vibrations from the bridge to the top.

=== Bolt-on necks ===
Most Tacoma guitars have bolt-on necks, without visible screw plates.

== Models ==
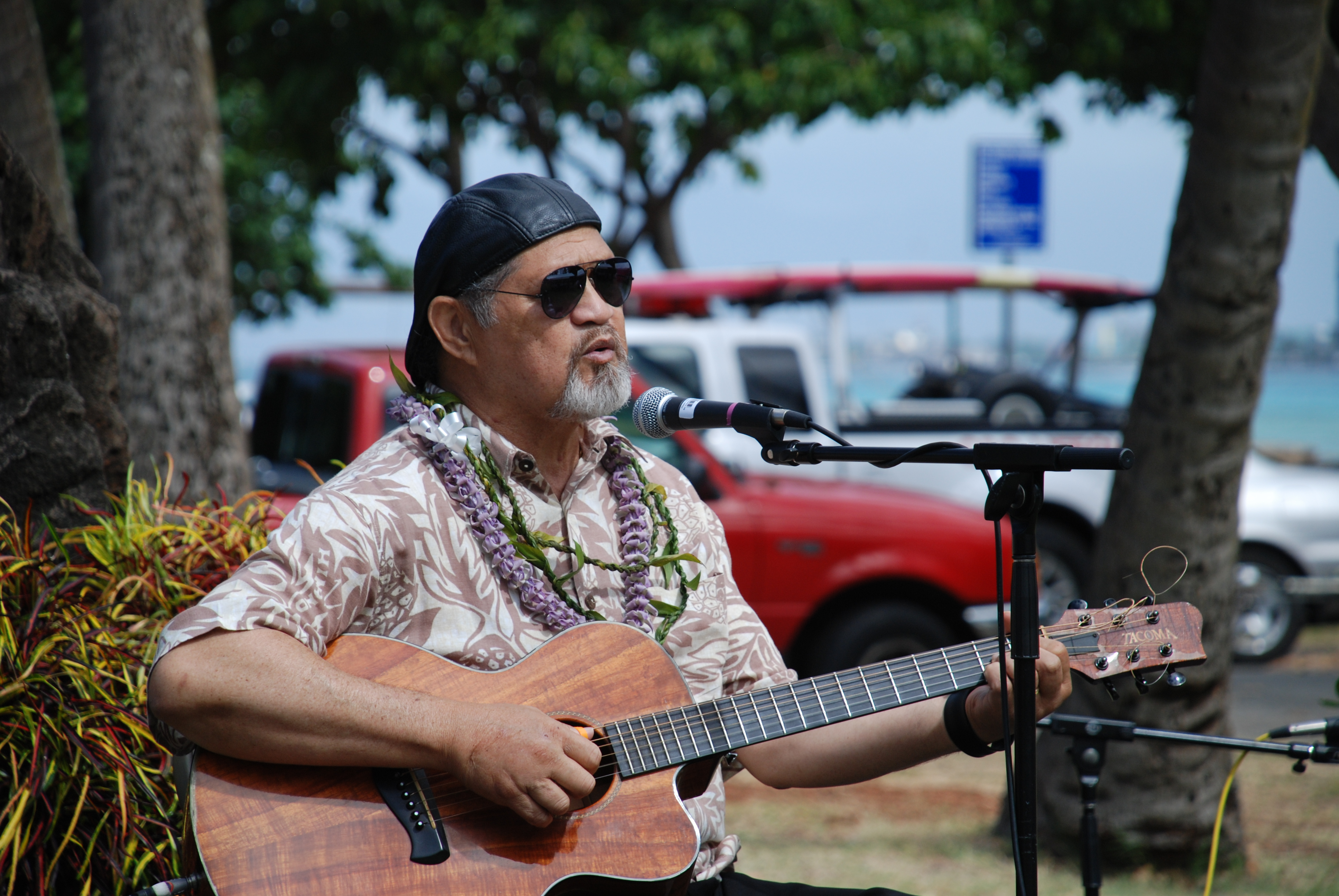
Hawaiian slack key guitarist playing a Tacoma EKK19c guitar made out of Koa wood.

=== Papoose ===
The P1 Papoose—designed by Terry Atkins and George Gruhn—was Tacoma's first guitar model. It has a relatively short 19.1" scale and is tuned to the same intervals as standard guitar tuning, but a fourth higher, to A rather than the conventional E, making it equivalent to a conventional guitar with a capo on the fifth fret. It introduced the paisley-shaped sound hole and the Voiced Bracing Support system. It was available in six and 12 string (P112) models.

==== Papoose electric ====
Tacoma offered solid body electric guitars based on the Papoose's proportions. This model, designated the SP1 featured a solid mahogany body, a bridge-mounted Duncan Designed humbucker, and an onboard headphone amplifier. The Papoose electric was discontinued by the end of 2006.

=== Chief ===
The C1C Chief had normal tuning and a scale length of 25.5". It was Tacoma's first full-sized Wing Series guitar. It had a rounded body similar in style to a "jumbo" guitar.

==== Archtop ====
Tacoma offered two archtop models based on the pattern of the Chief—the AJF22CE5, with natural wood color and satin finish, and the AJF28CE5 with high gloss finish. They made the AJF28 in natural and tobacco sunburst as standard colors, but offered many special order color schemes, including solid colors and various sunbursts. All AJF's featured tops that were carved (as opposed to steam bent) from solid Sitka spruce by modern CNC milling machines. Backs were CNC carved from solid (versus laminated) maple, with solid maple side panels.

Originally, the AJF series (aka: "Jazz King") used the "Chief-style" bolt-on neck construction, but Tacoma changed to a more traditional glued mortise and tenon neck joint. AJF's had a conventional ebony bridge with a composite tailpiece and pickguard/finger rest. EMG, Inc. designed a passive humbucking pickup for the AJF's. Volume and tone control wheels were cleverly hidden on the lower edge of the pickguard/finger rest.

=== Roadking ===
The Roadking is a Dreadnought-style Wing Series guitar. Roadking models include the Tacoma RM6C Roadking with a 25 1/2" scale length, the Tacoma RM6 (non-cutaway) with the same length, the 1998 Tacoma DM8C Roadking, cutaway with solid Mahogany back, sides and one piece neck, Sitka Spruce top, Rosewood fretboard and pinless bridge with 22 frets and a 25 1/2" scale length and the 1999 Tacoma DR8C Roadking. The standard Roadking had a spruce front, but mahogany and rosewood were also an option. Some rare Koa Roadkings exist, and were probably made to specifications from a customer. When ordered direct from the factory (as opposed to buying from a retailer), many options could be hand picked, including the type of wood.

=== Thunderhawk Baritone ===
The BM6C Thunderhawk and BF28C Thunderhawk were acoustic baritone guitars tuned to "B". They have a 29" scale length.

=== Thunderchief Bass ===
The CB10C Thunderchief and CB28C Thunderchief were acoustic bass guitars featuring an oversized body with rosewood and ebony fretboards respectively. They have 34" scale lengths. They were available in 5-string versions as the CB105C and the CB285C respectively. Tacoma CB285C 5 String Jumbo Acoustic Electric Bass Guitar. A guitar identical to the Thunderchief was later produced under the "Olympia by Tacoma" brand, produced in the Far East. Though it was much cheaper, it was also very enjoyable.

=== Conventional models ===
In addition to paisley-holed Wing Series, Tacoma also made conventional guitars in different series. The series differed in woods and decorations.

==== 55 series ====
55 Series instruments featured maple bindings, rosewood backs and sides, abalone floral inlays, and hand-rubbed UV gloss finishes. They include a Dreadnought model and a Jumbo model.

==== 28 series ====
28 Series instruments feature gold tuners, abalone trim, and hand-rubbed UV gloss finish. They include Dreadnought models in regular style (DM28), with cutaway (DM28C), as 12-string guitars (DM2812), and with rosewood back and sides (DR28), Jumbo models with cutaway (JK28C) and as 12-string guitars (JF2812), a Little Jumbo cutaway (ER28C) and a parlor model (PM28)

==== 14 series ====
14 Series instruments feature ebony fingerboards and bridges and hand-rubbed UV gloss top finishes. They include Dreadnought models and a Little Jumbo cutaway model.

==== 9 series ====
9 Series instruments feature all-solid construction, mahogany back and sides and satin finish. They include Dreadnought models, a Jumbo model and a Little Jumbo cutaway model.

=== Mandolins ===
Tacoma made Wing Series mandolins with spruce tops and mahogany (model # M1), Indian rosewood (model # M2) or maple (model # M3) backs and sides.
