= ARISE Adelante =

Nonprofit serving immigrants in South Texas

ARISE Adelante is a nonprofit serving women and children in unincorporated colonias (very low-income, informal communities) in South Texas. ARISE stands for A Resource In Serving Equality. It was founded by Roman Catholic sister Gerrie Naughton in 1987 in conjunction with women from the local community. ARISE assists new members for a while, but then they must agree to volunteer back to the community, working in a distributive leadership model. Its motto, from its founder, is "ARISE does not do for the people what the people can do for themselves." It is cosponsored by the Sisters of Charity and the Sisters of Mercy of the Incarnate Word.

== Recognition ==
The US Conference of Catholic Bishops through the Catholic Campaign for Human Development recognized ARISE as serving over 5,000 women and children at any given time, "helping the people of the Rio Grande Valley participate in processes that promote their rights and dignity as human beings." In 2015 the Building Community Workshop of Dallas, a secular organization, added founder Gerrie Naughton to a set of trading cards it prints to honor "heroes of the Rio Grande Valley." ARISE gives the Gerrie Naughton Award annually in her honor. In 2024 MacKenzie Scott's foundation granted ARISE $2 million, the largest gift in its history.

The Rio Grande Guardian did a five-part series on Sr. Naughton, ARISE, and the work of its all-woman team. ARISE was featured on CNN's The Lead with Jake Tapper in 2023. In 2020 Glamour magazine profiled ARISE. It is the subject of a colonias project begun at Southwest Texas State University, which today is Texas State University.

Sister Norma Pimentel, executive director of Catholic Charities of the Rio Grande Valley, who in 2020 was in the Time 100, works closely with ARISE. Every week ARISE volunteers from the colonias go to the Catholic Charities Respite Center and assist migrants with their visas. The center helps them get safely to sponsoring families and organizations.

ARISE is regularly featured or mentioned in many English- and Spanish-language newspapers in and around the Rio Grande Valley. Examples include the Rio Grande Guardian (multiple features), El Paso Times (multiple features), and ValleyCentral.com. ARISE has been in the Catholic media, including Global Sisters Report, Our Sunday Visitor, and the Sacred Heart publications King Street Chronicle and Sacred Heart Greenwich. ARISE has also been featured on the popular podcast "A Nun's Life," sponsored by five congregations of women religious and regularly featured in Global Sisters Report.
