= John H. Edelmann =

American architect (1852–1900)

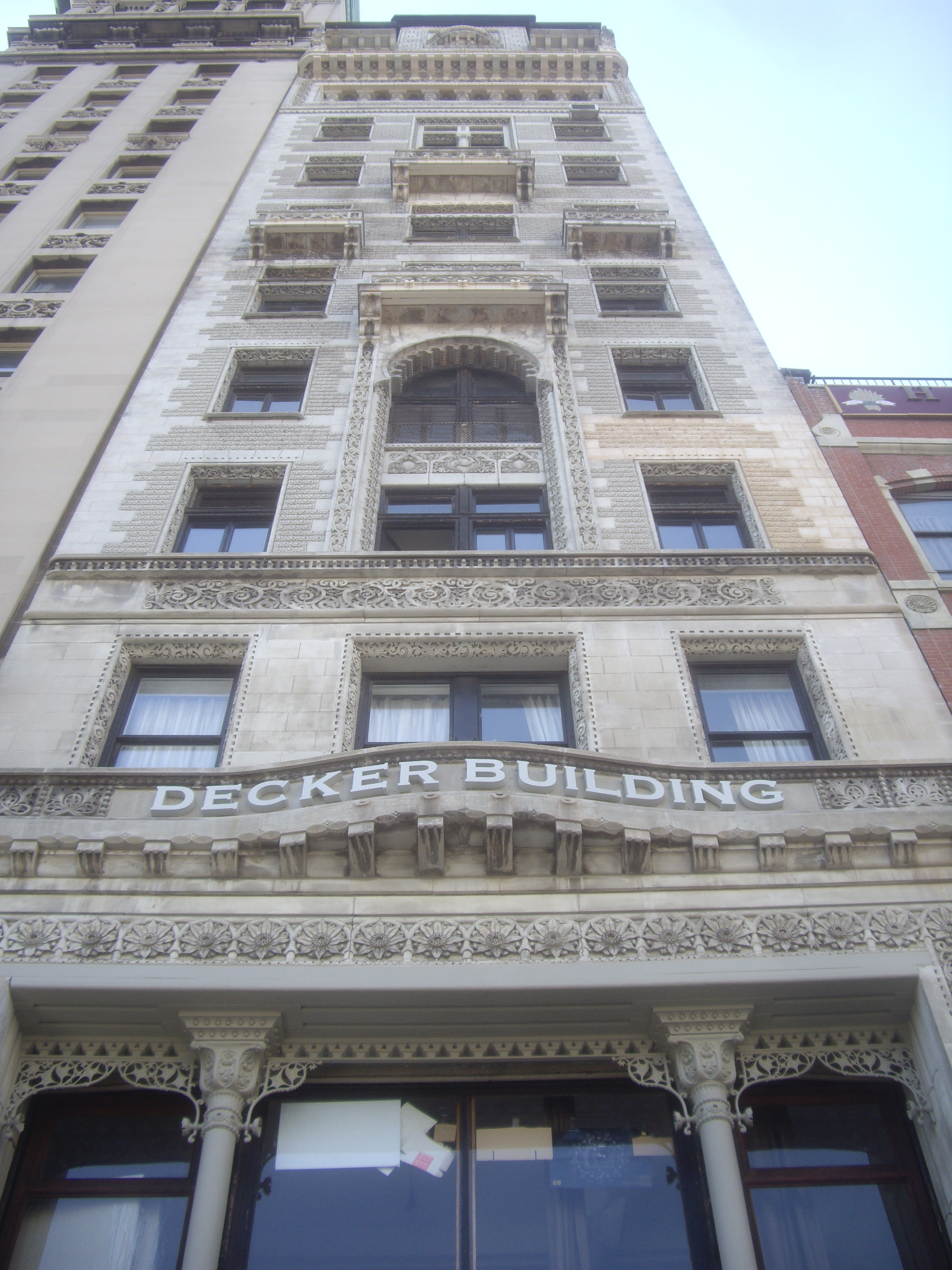
The Decker Building in New York City is Edelmann's sole surviving monument.

John H. Edelmann (1852 – 1900) was a socialist and anarchist who worked as an architect in the office of Alfred Zucker, a successful commercial architect of the 1880s and 1890s in New York City. As an architect, Edelmann's sole surviving monument is the former headquarters of the Decker Brothers Piano Company, the Decker Building (1893), at 33 Union Square West, New York. Louis Sullivan was influenced by his work with Edelmann and credits Edelmann's concept of "suppressed function" with the inspiration for his maxim, "Form follows function," a watchword of Modernism.

As a youth, Edelmann served as an architectural draftsman in his native Cleveland. In 1872, he moved to Chicago and was employed by the firm of Burling, Adler, and Co. The following year, Edelmann became foreman of William Le Baron Jenney's drafting room. It was at this time that he first met the young Louis Sullivan, who was also a draftsman in Jenney's office. In 1874, Edelmann formed a partnership with Joseph S. Johnston, who had worked with him as a draftsman at Burling, Adler, & Co. That year, the firm was responsible for the design of the Moody Tabernacle Choir, located in Chicago.

Perhaps prompted by a decline in his Chicago practice and by his father's death, in 1876 Edelmann returned to Cleveland where he was soon employed as a draftsman. However, illness led to a hiatus in his architectural career. Having regained his health by 1880, Edelmann returned to Chicago, acting as office foreman for Adler, who was now practicing without his former partner. In 1881, after insuring that Sullivan would succeed him as Adler's foreman, Edelmann returned once again to Cleveland, where he is said to have designed the pavilion for President Garfield's catafalque. In Cleveland, he joined the firm of Coburn & Barnum as foreman and supervisor of construction, "covering ... (their] buildings ... with Sullivanesque ornament. There he supervised construction of the Blackstone and the Perkins-Power Blocks (1881) which he may have helped design. As architect for J. B. Perkins, Edelmann is credited with the design of the Gilman, Wilshire, Stephens and Widlar Buildings (1882-83), structures conceived in the spirit of the new commercial architecture in Chicago. It has been observed that the several buildings he designed for Coburn & Barnum and for Perkins "evolved from polychromatic Victorian toward a Chicago functionalism." By 1883, Edelmann had again returned to Chicago where he is said to have helped design the Pullman Building (1884) as an employee of Solon Spencer Beman and where he may have helped to design Sullivan's Auditorium (1886–89).

In the late 1880s and throughout the 1890s, Edelmann worked in New York and lived for a time in what is now Kearny, New Jersey where he designed a house for himself (1894). In 1889-90 he was associated with Lyndon P. Smith, later supervising architect on Sullivan's Bayard-Condict Building (1898), a designated New York City Landmark. In 1891–93, Edelmann was often employed by New York architect Alfred Zucker, for whom he apparently designed the Decker Building and the interiors for the Hotel Majestic (1891–92). Edelmann is credited with "a certain exotic, Sullivanesque decoration that characterized the work of Alfred zucker." During these years, Edelmann may have occupied space in the offices of McKim, Mead & White, working partly for the firm and partly independently as a designer and as a supervisor of construction. From September 1896 to the end of 1897, Edelmann's name appears on the list of McKim, Mead, & White's employees, as a full-time employee; thereafter, Edelmann maintained his own office in New York, until his sudden death from a heart attack in 1900. Edelmann died during the heat wave in July of that year. His widow took their children to England and brought them up at Whiteway Colony.

The late Prof. Donald Egbert of Princeton indicates that Edelmann came to New York in 1886 to work in the mayoral campaign of Henry George, the most influential proponent of the "Single Tax" on land, also known as the land value tax. It was at a Single Tax rally for George that Edelmann met his wife. Edelmann worked in the offices of Alfred Zucker from 1891 to 1893.

The Socialist Labor Party expelled him for his outspoken anarchist ideas, and so he and a group of anarchists founded a Socialist League in 1892. He was on hand to welcome the Russian anarchist Peter Kropotkin on his first lecture tour in America; Kropotkin stayed in the Edelmann apartment on East 96th Street during his stay. Edelmann had married Rachelle Krimont, an Eastern European immigrant whose family were radicals. In 1893 he, Francesco Saverio Merlino an Italian lawyer, anarchist activist and theorist of libertarian socialism, and other radicals published an anarchist journal Solidarity, and after it folded his contributed articles to The Rebel, published in Boston. These activities brought him into the circle of the eminent American anarchist and writer Emma Goldman.

Years after his death, Edelmann's son, John W. Edelman, wrote of the difference between Sullivan and Edelmann,

Of my father, Louis Sullivan once wrote: "You can make up your mind that my reputation as an architect will always be inferior to his."

That turned out to be a mistaken prophecy. What made Sullivan famous, apart from his genius, was that he thought, dreamed, and lived nothing but architecture; architecture was his whole life. My father, on the other hand, was involved in so many projects that I don't see how he designed as much as he did. A fair baritone and a devotee of Wagnerian concerts, he was also an excellent amateur oarsman; he loved horses and both bred and raced them; and he was a sculptor, a painter, an anarchist, and a Single Taxer. When he left the Jenney firm in Chicago and moved to New York, for example, it was not to further his architectural career but to help direct Henry George's campaign for mayor in 1886.

Edelmann was from a German family, originally members of the minor nobility, titled "Edelmann von Lilienthal" in the records of Lower Saxony. The "von Lilienthal" was dropped when Edelmann's parents fled the revolution of 1848 and settled in Cleveland.

== Published writing ==
- "Pessimism of Modern Architecture," Engineering Magazine, April 1892, 44–54.
- "Labor Day," The Rebel, vol. 1, no. 1, September 20, 1895.
- "The International Congress," The Rebel, vol. 1, no. 2, October 20, 1895.
- "The Commune of Paris," The Rebel, vol. 1, no. 6, March–April, 1896.
