= New Era Building (New York City) =

Building in Manhattan, New York

Coordinates: 40°43′19.5″N 73°59′59.35″W

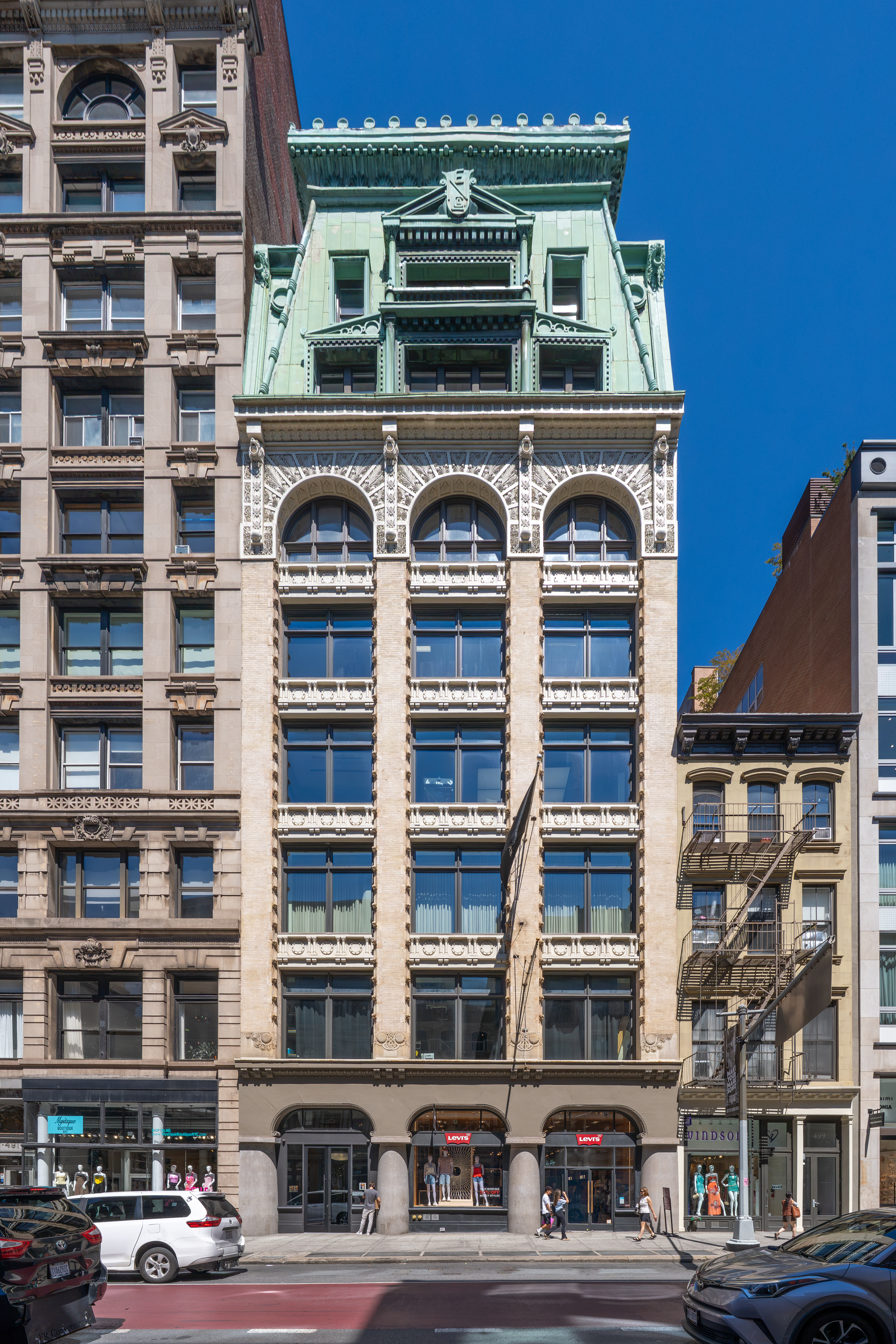
- New Era Building (2026)
- Interactive map of the New Era Building area

General information
- Architectural style: Art Nouveau
- Location: 495 Broadway; Manhattan, New York City, New York
- Completed: 1893

Height
- Height: 116 feet (35 m)

Technical details
- Floor count: 8

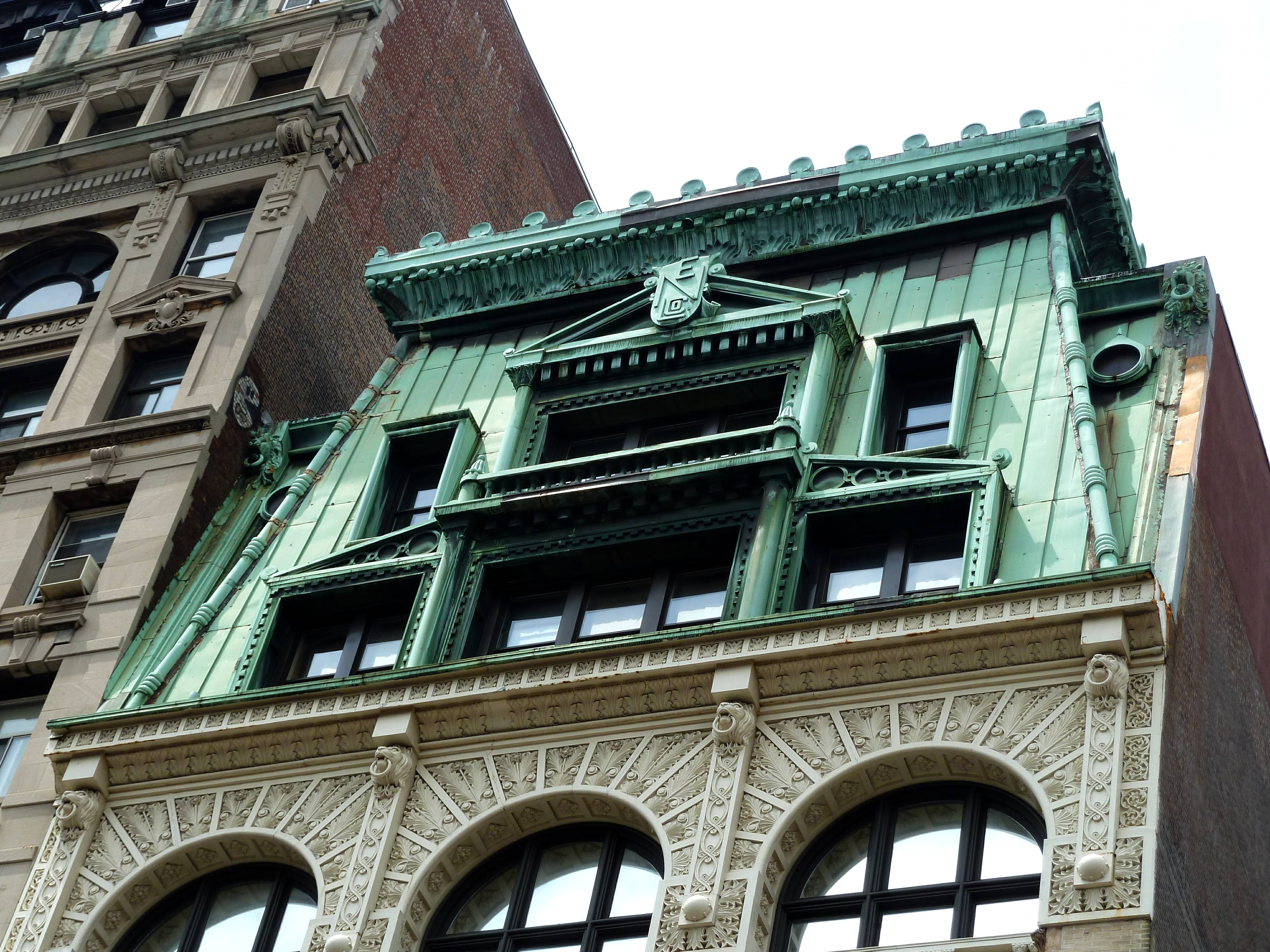
Detail of copper-front mansard roof and sixth-story iron ornamentation

The New Era Building is an 1893 Art Nouveau commercial loft building at 495 Broadway, between Spring Street and Broome Street, in the SoHo section of Manhattan in New York City.

== Architecture ==
The eight-story brick and masonry building has been described as a "gem" and a "gorgeous example" of Art Nouveau architecture. Eschewing the then-popular Beaux Arts style, this is one of the few and possibly the earliest Art Nouveau building in Manhattan still standing. Four squat rounded Doric columns seem to support five stories with three vertical rows of large windows separated by brickwork and iron ornamentation, culminating in three large arches at the sixth floor. This is topped with a two-story copper fronted mansard roof, now coated with verdigris, reminiscent of Parisian architecture. The 90,000-square-foot (8,400 m^{2}) building is served by a freight elevator and two passenger elevators. Average floor size is 10,000 square feet (930 m^{2}). The building goes through the block west of Broadway so that it also fronts on Mercer Street, which is parallel to Broadway.

Sources differ as to the architect, developer, and year of construction. The New York City Landmarks Preservation Commission, in its 1973 report on the SoHo-Cast Iron Historic District, says the building, at 495 Broadway, was designed by Alfred Zucker for Augustus D. Juilliard and was completed in 1893. Several other sources shown below say the building was designed by Buchman & Deisler for Jeremiah C. Lyons, who had previously developed real estate in other areas of Manhattan, and was completed in 1897. However, many of these same sources mistakenly show the address as 491 Broadway. The New York City Landmarks Preservation Commission says 491 Broadway, the somewhat thinner 12-story building adjacent to the south of the New Era Building, is the 1897 Buchman & Deisler building.

== History ==
Although its lofts were originally intended for the New Era Printing Company, the building was soon occupied by an office of the Butler Brothers company, an early mail-order business that had 100,000 customers at the time they moved in. Later, in 1927, they began franchising the Ben Franklin Stores.

At the time this building opened, fashionable retail businesses were already moving further uptown. Soon the area was home to businesses such as manufacturers and waste paper dealers.

On December 29, 1927, a fire in the building caused a million dollars' worth of damage. It burned for two hours before being noticed and causing the partial collapse of eight floors toward the rear, or Mercer Street side, of the building. The fire began among some crates in the company's basement shipping room. The collapse was caused when three unprotected hollow cast iron support columns 14-inch (36 cm) in diameter buckled because of excessive heat, bringing down the eight stories above. Fire-resistant insulation might have prevented the collapse.

As of 2011, tenants included a clothing retailer, fashion consultants, a publisher, a golf and fitness club, a retail drug store, and the Swiss Institute.

The Swiss Institute Contemporary Art New York occupied the third floor loft from 1994 until 2011. In September 2011 the institute moved to 18 Wooster Street, nearby.
