= Alfred Zucker =

German-American architect (1852–1913)

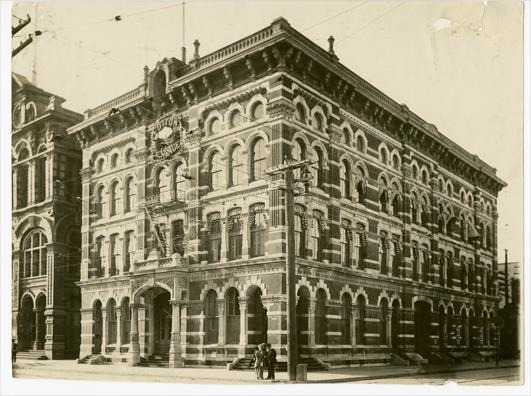
Galveston Cotton Exchange Building, 2102 Mechanic St., Galveston, Texas

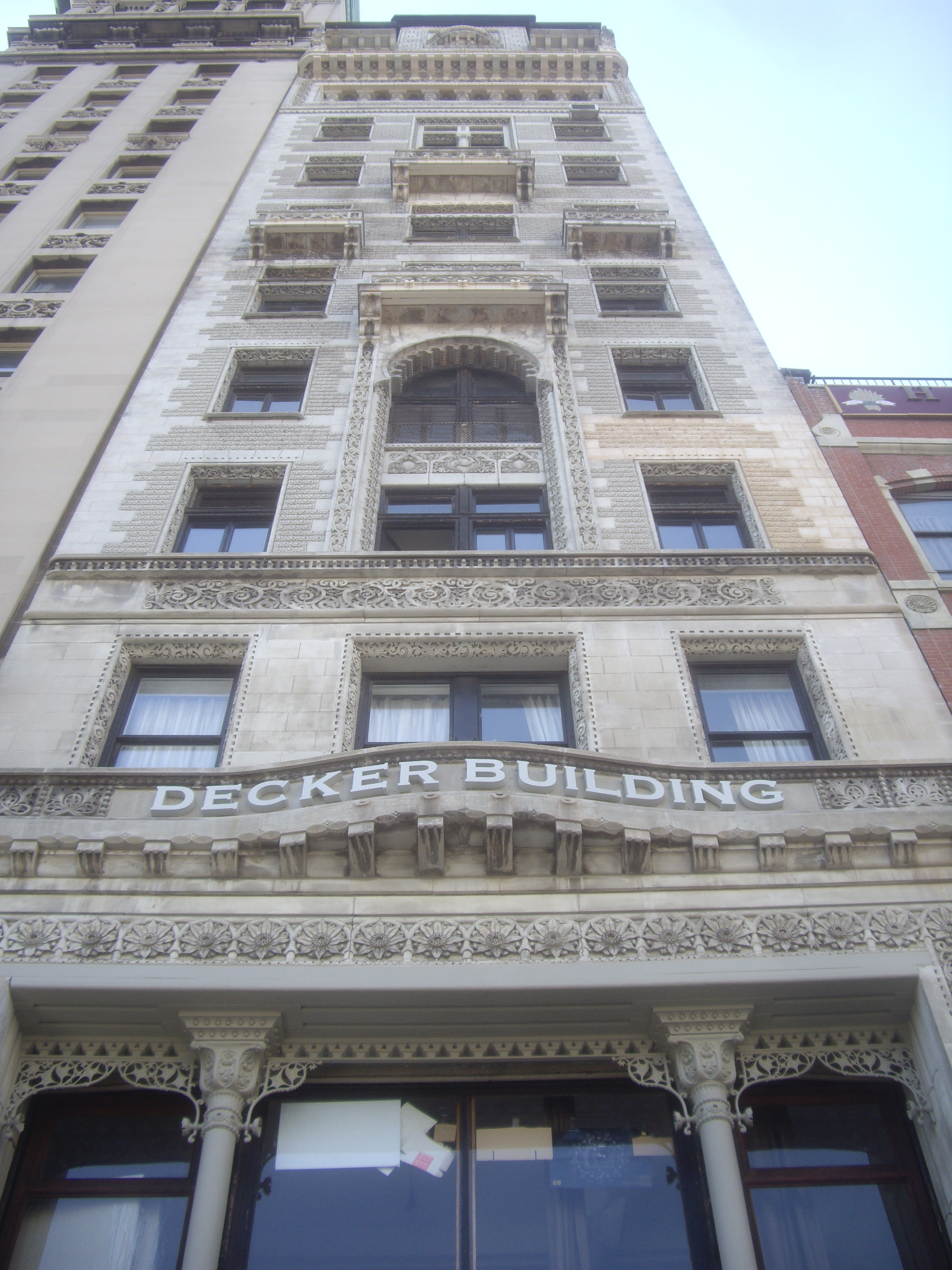
Decker Building, New York, NY (1892-93)

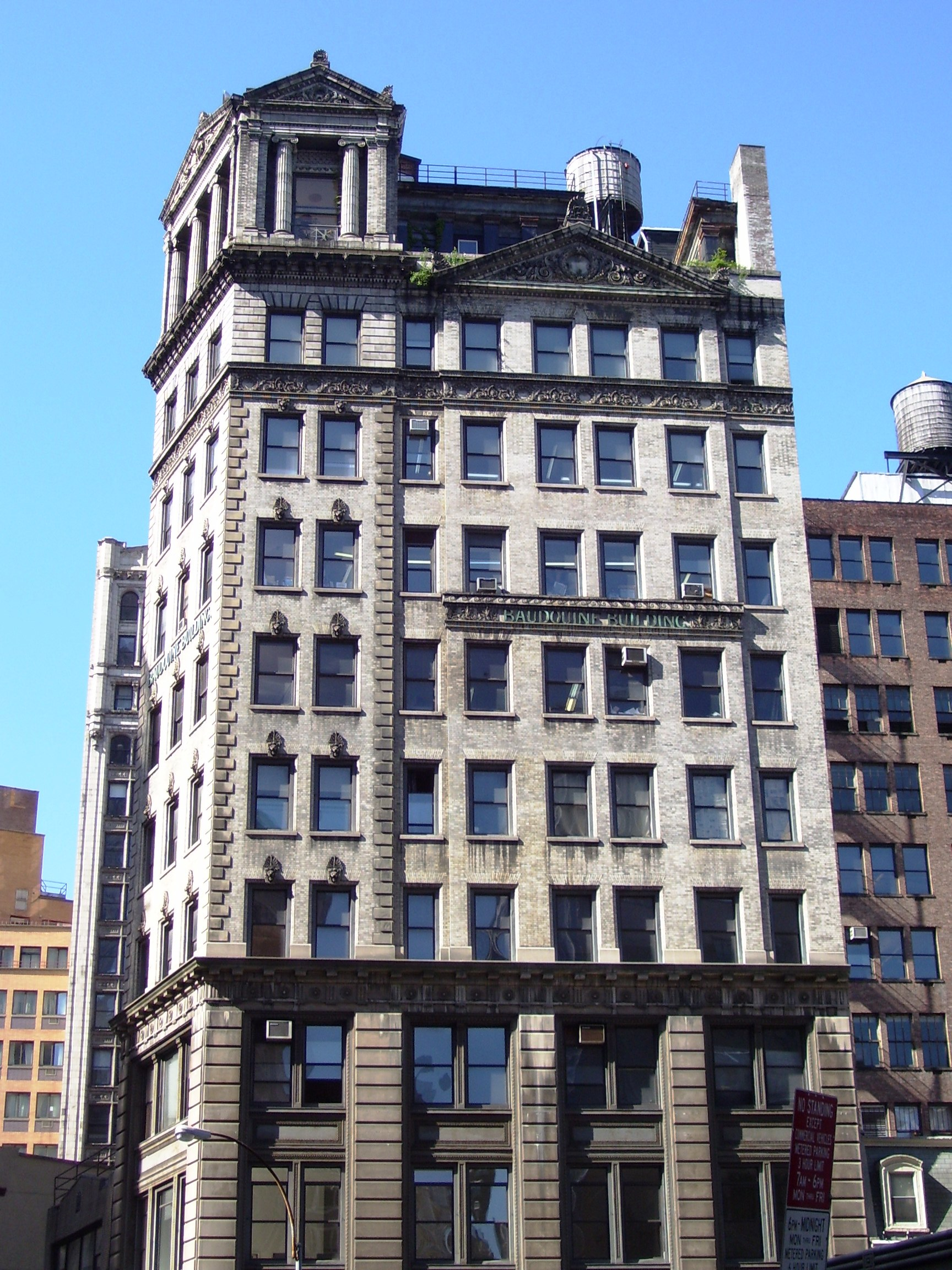
Baudouine Building, New York, NY (1895-96)

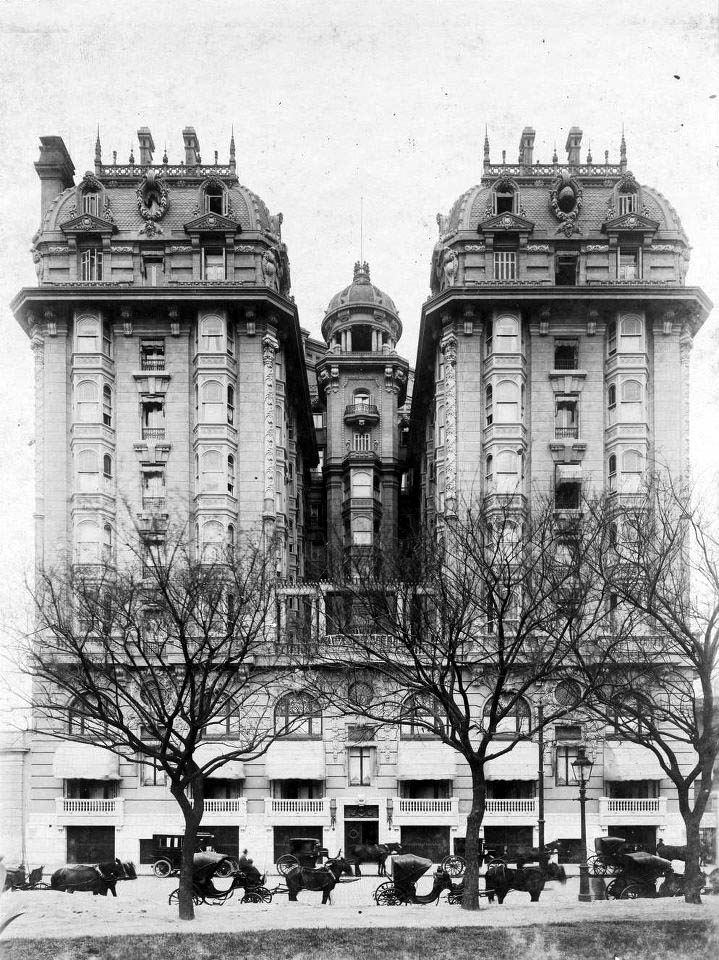
Hotel Plaza, Buenos Aires (1905-09)

Alfred J. R. E. Zucker (January 23, 1852 – August 2, 1913) was a German-American architect, who worked in Galveston, Texas, Mississippi, New York City, and Buenos Aires.

Alfred Zucker was born on January 23, 1852, in the town of Freiburg, Silesia, Prussia (since 1945 Świebodzice, Poland). He was educated at the Hannover Polytechnische Schule and the Bauakademie. He worked briefly for the government before immigrating to the United States in 1872, arriving at New York. From 1873 to 1876 he worked in the Office of the Supervising Architect, in Washington, D.C.

In 1877, Zucker relocated to the coastal city of Galveston. There, he became the partner of John Moser (1832-1904), an architect who moved there from Toledo, Ohio. Zucker married Moser's daughter, Augusta ("Gussie") Emilia Moser. She died in 1878 in the yellow fever epidemic in Vicksburg, Mississippi, just three months after their marriage. Zucker had left to establish a branch office of the firm in Vicksburg. The partnership lasted until 1880, when Moser relocated to Atlanta. By virtue of the firm's design for the Mississippi Agricultural and Mechanical College at Starkville, Zucker was appointed State Architect of Mississippi. Due to his poor health, Zucker resigned from his position in 1882 and returned to Europe. The following year, he returned to New York and found work in the office of noted architect Henry Fernbach. Upon Fernbach's death that same year, Zucker founded the firm of Alfred Zucker & Company, with John R. Hinchman as his partner. This association lasted until 1889, after which both Zucker and Hinchman practiced alone. From 1891 to 1893 Zucker employed John H. Edelmann as a designer in his office. Edelmann is known to have designed full buildings for Zucker, most prominently the Decker Building. Edelmann left after 1893, but his work inspired Zucker's later designs until at least 1901.

After 1896, there was less and less work in Zucker's office. As a cost-saving measure, in 1897 he made several employees partners in the firm. These former employees received a fraction of the payments from each design executed, relieving Zucker of the worries of regular wages. Near the end of his American career, Zucker was associated with J. Riely Gordon, a noted architect of public buildings. Gordon was the probable designer of Zucker's Wilkinson County Courthouse in Woodville, Mississippi, which follows Gordon's standard plan. It was his association with Gordon that ended Zucker's American career. In 1904 he fled with his family to Buenos Aires. His goal was to avoid a "$100,000 suit filed by Gordon, who alleged fraud and misrepresentation". He would have a successful practice in Buenos Aires, dying there in 1913. He would remarry, to Jennie Nace Brooke.

== Works ==
- Clara Lang Building, 2109 Strand St., Galveston, Texas (1877) – originally four stories, but the upper two were destroyed in the Hurricane of 1900
- Galveston Cotton Exchange Building, 2102 Mechanic St., Galveston, Texas (1878) – demolished in 1940
- Herman Marwitz & Co. Building, 306 22nd St., Galveston, Texas (1878)
- Old Main, Mississippi Agricultural and Mechanical College, Starkville, Mississippi (1879–80) – burned in 1959
- Mississippi Institute for the Blind, 605 E. Fortification St., Jackson, Mississippi (1881) – demolished
- East Mississippi State Insane Asylum, 4555 Highland Park Dr., Meridian, Mississippi (1882–84) – Extant but wholly remodeled.
- 241 West Broadway, New York, New York (1884)
- Cohnfeld Building, 106 Bleecker St., New York, New York (1884) – burned in 1891
- 433 Broadway, New York, New York (1885) – demolished
- 1029 6th Ave., New York, New York (1885) – demolished
- Ehrich Brothers Store, 695 6th Ave., New York, New York (1886)
- St. Patrick R. C. Church, 2614 Davis St., Meridian, MS (1886)
- Carrie Hornthal House, 4 E. 78th St., New York, New York (1887)
- Progress Club, 820 5th Ave., New York, New York (1888) – demolished
- St. Francis of Assisi R. C. Church, 227 E. Cherokee St., Brookhaven, Mississippi (1888)
- Rouss Building, 555 Broadway, New York, New York (1889)
- 3-5 Washington Pl., New York, New York (1890) – owned by New York University
- 484 Broome St., New York, New York (1890)
- 716 Broadway, New York, New York (1890)
- 12 Waverly Pl., New York, New York (1891–93)
- 36 E. 12th St., New York, New York (1891)
- 246 Greene St., New York, New York (1891)
- 411 Lafayette St., New York, New York (1891)
- Geraldine Building, 7 E. 16th St., New York, New York (1891)
- Hotel Majestic, 115 Central Park West, New York, New York (1891) – demolished
- 28-30 Waverly Pl., New York, New York (1892) – originally 8 stories; now taller and integrated into the University Building
- 494 Broome St., New York, New York (1892)
- Decker Building, 33 Union Square West, New York, New York (1892–93) – designed by Edelmann; Zucker moved the firm's offices here from the Lincoln Building
- New Era Building, 495 Broadway, New York, New York (1892)
- 256 5th Ave., New York, New York (1893) – designed by Edelmann
- Corndiac Building, 139 5th Ave., New York, New York (1893)
- 450 Broome St., New York, New York (1894)
- 458 Broadway, New York, New York (1894)
- The Bolkenhayn, 761-763 5th Ave., New York, New York (1894) – demolished
- Hoffman House Annex, 1115 Broadway, New York, New York (1894) – demolished
- University Building, 100 Washington Square East, New York, New York (1894) – Zucker moved his offices here in 1900
- 13 University Pl., New York, NY (1895–96)
- Baudouine Building, 1181 Broadway, New York, New York (1895–96)
- 50 W. 4th St., New York, New York (1896)
- Piazza & Botto Building, 1321 Washington St., Vicksburg, Mississippi (1898) – demolished
- Harlem Casino, 2081 Adam Clayton Powell, Jr. Blvd., New York, New York (1899) – altered beyond recognition
- B. S. Ricks Memorial Library, 310 N. Main St., Yazoo City, Mississippi (1900–01)
- The Langdon, 157 W. 124th St., New York, New York (1901) – used for storage since at least 1914
- 285 Mercer St., New York, New York (1902)
- Wilkinson County Courthouse, 525 Main St., Woodville, Mississippi (1902)
- Hotel Plaza, Florida 1005, Buenos Aires, Argentina (1905–09)
- Edificio Villalonga, Balcarce & Moreno, Buenos Aires, Argentina (1908) – demolished
- Avenida Palace Hotel, Hipólito Yrigoyen 442, Buenos Aires, Argentina (c.1911) – demolished
- Pedestal of the Monumento George Washington, Palermo Park, Buenos Aires, Argentina (1912–13)
- Edificio del Banco Germánico, Reconquista 29, Buenos Aires, Argentina (1913) – demolished
