= Decker Building =

Commercial building in Manhattan, New York

- U.S. National Register of Historic Places
- New York State Register of Historic Places
- New York City Landmark
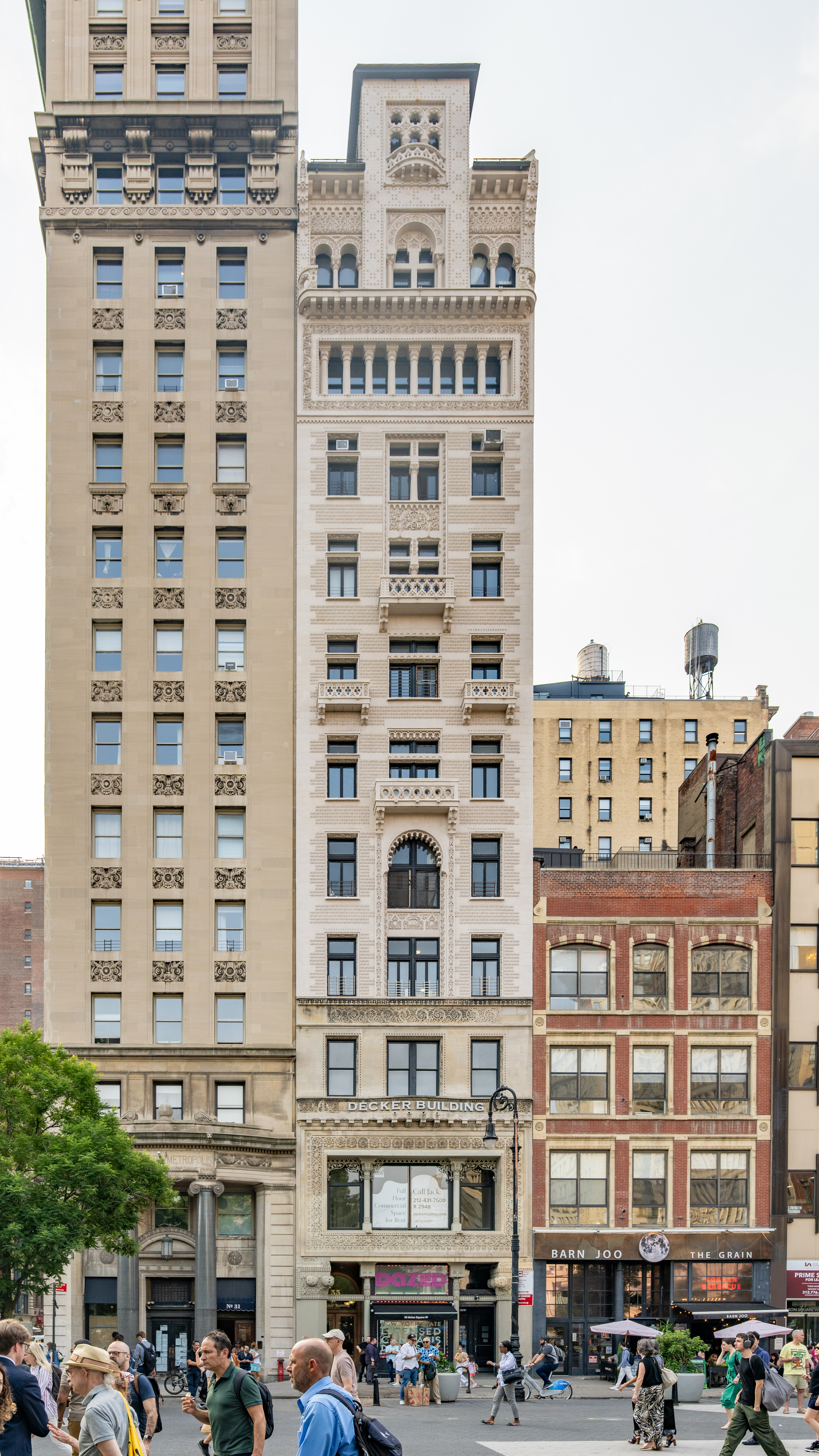
- Seen in 2025, with the Bank of the Metropolis at left
- Location: 33 Union Square West, New York, New York
- Coordinates: 40°44′12″N 73°59′27″W
- Built: 1893
- Architect: John H. Edelmann
- Architectural style: Late 19th and early 20th century American movements
- NRHP reference No.: 03001179
- NYSRHP No.: 06101.008582
- NYCL No.: 1538

Significant dates
- Added to NRHP: November 21, 2003
- Designated NYSRHP: September 19, 2003
- Designated NYCL: July 12, 1988

The Decker Building (also the Union Building) is a commercial building located at 33 Union Square West in Manhattan, New York City. The structure, designed by John H. Edelmann for the Decker Brothers piano company, was completed in 1892. From 1968 to 1973, it served as the location of the artist Andy Warhol's studio, The Factory. The Decker Building was designated a New York City landmark in 1988, and was added to the National Register of Historic Places in 2003.

== Description ==
The building is only 33 feet (10 m) wide and 138 feet (42 m) deep on a lot that goes back 150 feet (46 m). It has a right of way to 16th Street from the rear of the building. The style of the building mixes influences from Venice and Islamic traditions. There are numerous terra cotta details on the façade which remain today. There was a minaret on the roof which disappeared before World War II.

The building was valued at $285,000 in 1913, after which it was traded to settle debts.

== History ==
The structure was built in 1892 for the Decker Brothers piano company according to designs by the radical anarchist architect John H. Edelmann, working out of the offices of Alfred Zucker. It replaced the earlier Decker Building on the same lot, designed by Leopold Eidlitz and built in 1869.

On November 25, 1950, 27 year old Abraham Yeager was killed when a one-ton piece of cornice from the Decker Building collapsed onto the sidewalk where Yeager was walking.

=== Andy Warhol's Factory ===
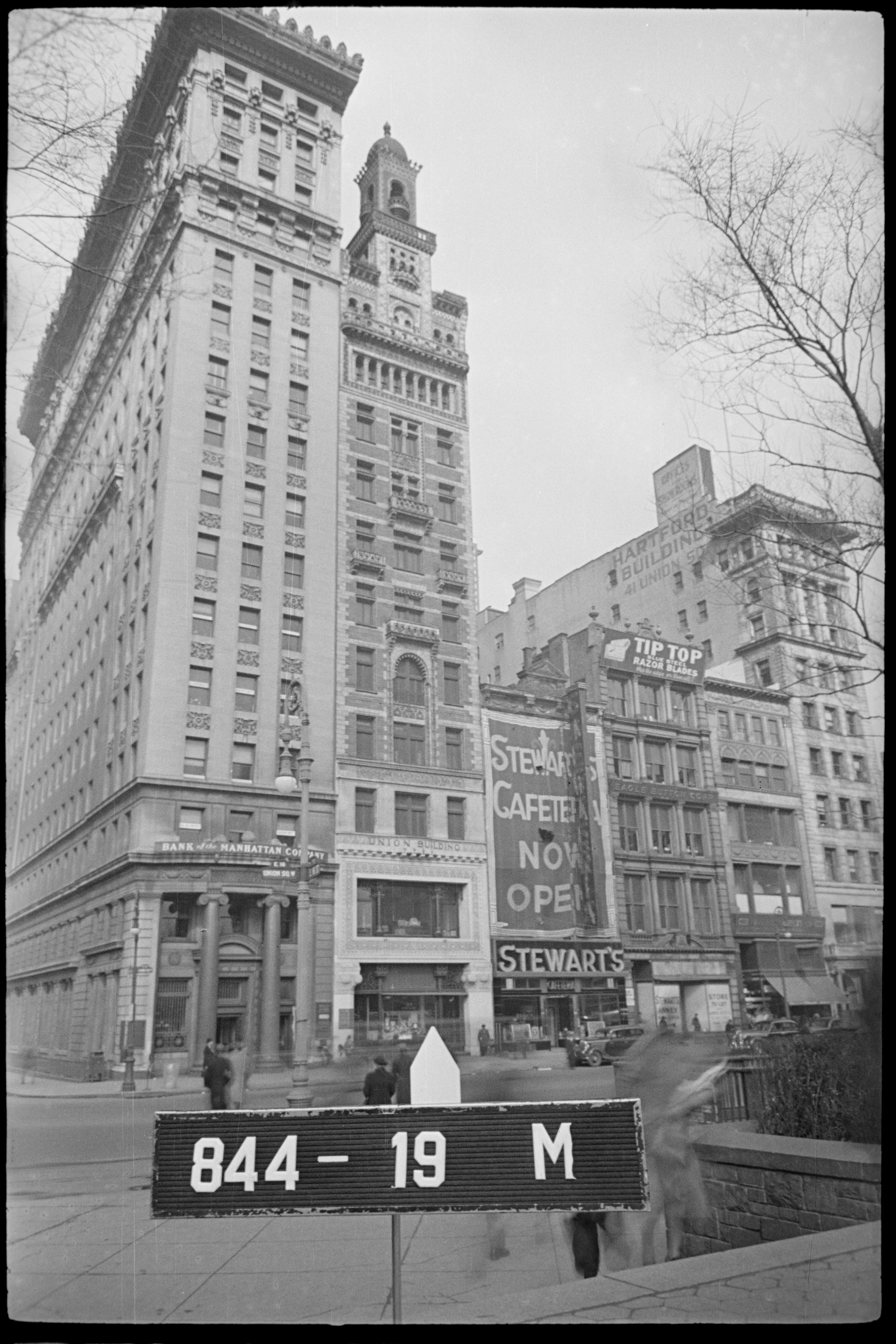
33 Union Square West in a 1940 tax photo

In 1968, Pop artist Andy Warhol relocated his studio, the Factory, from 231 East 47th Street after the building was slated for demolition. He rented the entire sixth floor at the Decker Building, including a small balcony overlooking Union Square, a then-declining area, after his office manager Paul Morrissey found the space. Warhol was drawn to the building's proximity to Max's Kansas City, a favorite gathering place. During preparations for the move, Jed Johnson, a young Western Union messenger, delivered a telegram to the Factory and was hired by Morrissey to assist with renovations. Johnson moved in with Warhol later that year and became his longtime partner.

On June 3, 1968, radical feminist Valerie Solanas shot and seriously wounded Warhol, also injuring curator Mario Amaya. At the time, the Factory operated under an open-door policy, allowing unrestricted access. After the shooting, security measures were introduced, which included Johnson installing a Dutch door and enclosing the elevator with a wall that required visitors to buzz for entry.

In the early 1970s, Warhol had assistants videotape visitors and document daily activity at the studio. In 1974, he relocated the Factory to the nearby 860 Broadway building, and during the move, he began assembling what became known as the Warhol Time Capsules.

=== Offices of the Fraye Arbeter Shtime ===
The Fraye Arbeter Shtime (The Free Voice of Labor), the longest-running Yiddish anarchist newspaper in the world at the time of its closure, operated out of Room 808 in the building in its final decades of publication.

=== Refurbishment ===
The building was completely refurbished into apartments by Joseph Pell Lombardi in 1995. In 2015, Dylan's Candy Bar opened a ground-floor storefront in the building, which closed in 2021.

== See also ==
- Decker Brothers
- List of New York City Designated Landmarks in Manhattan from 14th to 59th Streets
- National Register of Historic Places listings in Manhattan from 14th to 59th Streets
