= Young Chang =

South Korean manufacturer of pianos and industrial wood working machinery

HDC Young Chang
- Industry: Musical instruments
- Founded: 1956; 70 years ago
- Founder: Jai-Young Kim; Jai-Chang Kim; Jai-Sup Kim
- Headquarters: Incheon, South Korea
- Area served: Worldwide
- Products: Pianos, string instruments, and wind instruments
- Revenue: US$281 million (1998)
- Number of employees: 3,817 (1998)
- Subsidiaries: Tianjin Young Chang Akki Company; Young Chang (America) Timber; Young Chang America; Weber Piano Company; Kurzweil Music Systems
- Website: youngchang.com

HDC YoungChang (Hangul: HDC영창) is a South Korean manufacturer of pianos and industrial wood working machinery, headquartered in Incheon, South Korea. It currently holds 50% of the South Korean piano market, and is among the largest and most automated of the world's piano manufacturers.

== Operations ==
Young Chang had four manufacturing facilities as of 1999, three producing pianos and the fourth a sawmill producing wood for export from the United States. The sawmill was located in Tacoma, Washington and was established in 1991. Piano manufacturing took place in plants in Seoul and Incheon, South Korea, both established in 1964, and Tianjin, China, established in 1995. The company also maintained a research and development facility in Waltham, Massachusetts. The company's Tianjin manufacturing site is run through subsidiary Tianjin Young Chang Akki Company, Limited, while the Tacoma sawmill is managed through subsidiary Young Chang America Timber, Incorporated.

As of the late 1990s, Young Chang, at the time known as Young Chang Akki Company, was among the largest of the world's manufacturers of pianos, alongside Samick, Yamaha and Kawai, and one of five multinationals producing pianos. Young Chang reported sales in the United States, China, Canada, Korea and the European Union under its own brand.

The company also produces pianos for other companies. For instance, it began producing Cline pianos for Cline Piano Company of Belmont, California in 1992; and began producing Knabe pianos for Music Systems Research of Sacramento, California in the late 1990s. Young Chang produced pianos for Nakamichi of Hamamatsu, Japan until 1998; the units were modified by Nakamichi before export to the United States. The company had at one time produced Wurlitzer pianos for United States-distribution by Baldwin Piano & Organ, but this relationship was terminated prior to the late 1990s.

The company also markets under an alternative brand, Weber, held by subsidiary Weber Piano Company established in 1986. This brand was established specifically for English-speaking markets where a Korean brand name, as opposed to a German or American name, might be a disincentive to purchase.

== History ==
Young Chang was founded in 1956 as a distributor of Yamaha pianos for Korea and other parts of Asia. The company was founded by three brothers, Jai-Young Kim, Jai-Chang Kim and Jai-Sup Kim, as South Korea emerged as a major economy and producer of high quality goods. The first Young Chang factory was built in Seoul in 1964.

During the late 1980s and early 1990s, Young Chang manufactured Squier electric guitars and basses for Fender Musical Instruments Corporation, and also manufactured acoustic, acoustic/electric, electric guitars and basses under their own "Fenix" brand. However, because of the similarities to the Fender brand and instruments, Young Chang could not sell the Fenix instruments due to licensing issues with Fender, and production stopped. In addition to guitars and pianos (vertical and grand varieties), Young Chang produced in the late 1990s harmonicas, reed organs and industrial woodworking machinery.

In 1986, the company established Weber Piano Company, which sells pianos under the Weber brand name, which it had purchased rights to use after the demise of the Aeolian Piano Company in 1985. Young Chang subsequently sold this subsidiary to Samsung America in 1987.

From 1987–1988 Young Chang manufactured and supplied electric guitars to U.S musical instrument chain store Samuel Music Company. These were sold under Samuel Music's house brand "Vester". The guitars were imported into the United States by Midco Music (now Musicorp.) After 1988 Samuel Music used other Korean musical instrument factories to build acoustic and electric guitars.

In 1988, Young Chang established a foundry for production of piano plates in Tianjin, China, to supplement production of this key component, also produced in Korea. The success of this facility was one factor leading to the 1995 establishment of a piano manufacturing facility in Tianjin.

In 1990, Young Chang purchased Kurzweil Music Systems, a maker of high end electronic and digital musical instruments.

In 1991, Young Chang invested US$32 million to establish a subsidiary in Tacoma, Washington, Young Chang (America) Timber, to cut and process North American spruce and maple for export to its Asian manufacturing sites.

In 1995, Young Chang opened a new US$40 million factory in Tianjin. The Chinese facility allowed Young Chang to start serving the low-end markets, part of a long-term strategy involving shifting production from Korea to China. The quality of pianos produced by this new plant was initially high, but dropped sharply after technicians who had helped set up the production returned to Korea, which had a significant impact on their ability to complete sales.

Joseph Pramberger, a former vice president from Steinway & Sons (head of manufacturing) and an experienced piano designer, joined the company in 1995. Pramberger brought many innovations to piano design, including the "Platinum Touch Action" and the patented asymmetrically tapered soundboard. The Pramberger Platinum series, introduced in 2001, was Young Chang's top-of-the-line for three years. These models incorporated some German materials including Renner action parts. Joseph Pramberger died in 2003, and the following year, his estate sold the Pramberger name to Samick, but his patents and innovations are still exclusive to Young Chang.

The year following the opening of the Tianjin, China factory, in October 1996, Young Chang entered into bankruptcy, emerging in August 1998. Young Chang has more than 2,000 full-time workers, designing and building its upright and grand pianos, and also the electronic Kurzweil Music Systems.

In 2004, Samick Musical Instrument Co. acquired a 48.13% stake in Young Chang, gained a controlling interest through a capital increase, and took control over management of the company. However, the Korea Fair Trade Commission blocked the acquisition as it would create a monopoly and ordered Samick to dispose of its shares in Young Chang. Following the Fair Trade Commission's decision, Young Chang went bankrupt on September 21, 2004.

Hyundai Development Company acquired Young Chang in 2006. The company was renamed to HDC Young Chang in 2018.
