= Joseph Pramberger =

Joseph J. Pramberger (1938–2003) was a piano engineer/designer and the founder of the Pramberger Piano Company.

== Lineage ==
The Pramberger family's history of piano craftsmanship dates back to the late 18th century in the Black Forest of Germany. Johann Joseph Pramberger, born in 1779, began making pianos in Vienna, Austria. Joseph Pramberger's father, Anton, began his apprenticeship at an early age handcrafting fine works of art, becoming a Master Artisan in the tradition of Old World European craftsman. The Pramberger family decided to leave war-torn Europe for the United States at the urging of family members who had been working at Steinway & Sons since 1913, in Astoria, New York. Anton had been promised work at the piano factory. There, he put his skills to work, dedicating 25 years as a Pattern Maker and designing and creating the equipment required to build fine pianos.

== Career ==
When Anton came to the United States in 1950, he brought his son, Joseph Pramberger, who would become the modern-day link in the Pramberger lineage of piano makers. Starting in 1958, he honed his craft at Steinway & Sons, where he spent 29 years perfecting his skills, first as an apprentice, then as a Design and Project Engineer, then as Vice President of Manufacturing.

Joseph further expanded his skills as a mechanical engineer at New York University in 1966, by studying, refining and documenting established piano making operations. He traveled the world visiting and consulting with suppliers and major piano manufactures in the U.S., Europe, Japan and Korea.

In 1987, he formed his own company, Pramberger Piano Ltd., where he and his father Anton worked together in the restoration and rebuilding of pianos.

Joseph joined Young Chang in 1995 where he made dramatic innovations in sound and action design to help improve the quality of their affordable grand pianos. That led the company to produce a new line called the Pramberger Series. Mr. Pramberger saw the culmination of his work in 2000 with the launch of his own piano line, the Pramberger Platinum Piano, which would continue to be produced for the next three years. The Pramberger Platinum series was the highest quality performance piano Young Chang had produced to that point. The action, manufactured with Renner parts, rivaled even the best German brands in that respect.

Mr. Pramberger died of cancer on December 15, 2003. After his death, his estate ended the contract with Young Chang. The result was the sale of the Pramberger name to the Samick corporation, which continues to produce pianos of the brand JP Pramberger. The current trim levels of JP Pramberger are "Platinum", "Signature", and "Legacy", from highest quality to consumer-grade. However, Young Chang kept the patents issued to Mr. Pramberger, and continues to use his innovations in their pianos to this day. Samick is, by law, not allowed to utilize Mr. Pramberger's designs because they are the corporate property of Young Chang. Most piano technicians and dealers consider the Korean-made Young Chang Prambergers of slightly higher quality than the Indonesian-made Samick Prambergers of today, especially in regard to the action.

According to Larry Fine, author of "The Piano Book", Samick's current JP Pramberger Platinum series is of comparable quality to the Kawai-produced Boston line designed by the Steinway corporation.
