= St. Patrick's Catholic Church (Meridian, Mississippi) =

Historic church in Mississippi, United States

- St. Patrick Catholic Church
- U.S. National Register of Historic Places
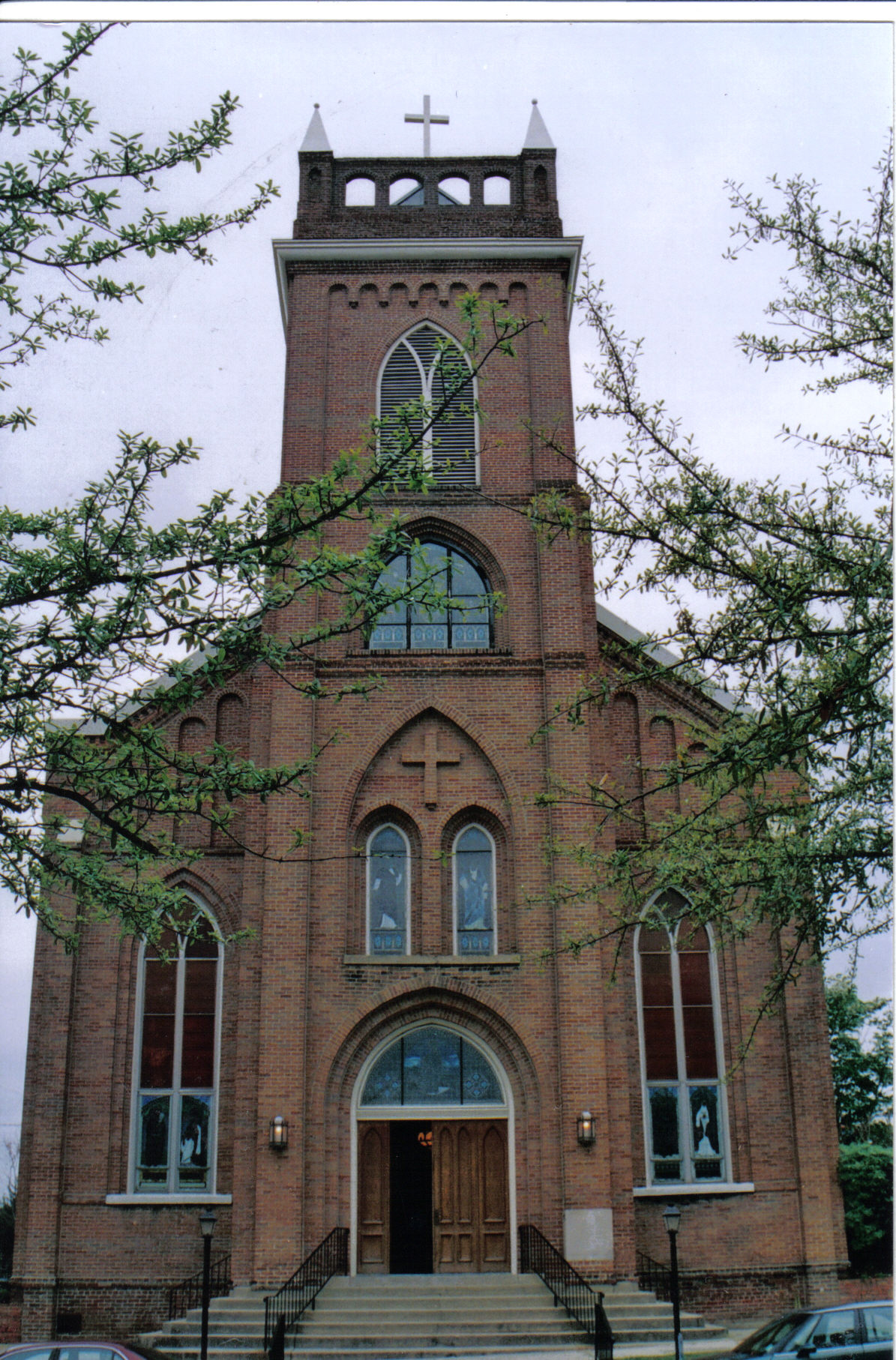

- Location within Mississippi Location within the United States
- Location: 2614 Davis St. Meridian, Mississippi
- Coordinates: 32°21′48″N 88°42′17″W
- Area: less than one acre
- Built: 1886
- Architect: Zucker, Alfred; Covert, George S.
- Architectural style: Gothic Revival
- MPS: Meridian MRA
- NRHP reference No.: 79003403
- Added to NRHP: December 18, 1979

St. Patrick Catholic Church is a parish of the Catholic Church in Meridian, Mississippi, in the Diocese of Jackson. Its historic church, located at 2614 Davis Street, was designed by Alfred Zucker. Since 1995, St. Patrick's, the historically African-American parish of St. Joseph, and St. Joseph of Cupertino at Naval Air Station Meridian have operated as the Catholic Community of Meridian, sharing pastoral and administrative staff.

Catholic missionaries from Paulding County arrived in 1853, and the community build its first church on the site in 1866, with 12 families on the roll. Its first resident parish priest, Fr. Louis Vally, arrived in 1868. Under his leadership the parish grew considerably, starting its parochial school in 1873 and acquiring land for its convent in 1877. It was also during Vally's tenure that the current Gothic Revival was built, in 1886.

== Church ==
The church was designed by Alfred J.R.E. Zucker, a German-American architect then based in Vicksburg. The church is a modified cruciform structure of brick. At its entrance is a four-story square tower with a round arch balustrade. Its lancet stained glass windows are set in compound pointed arches in slightly recessed bays. It added to the National Register of Historic Places in 1979.

== School ==
St. Patrick School was established in 1873, and housed in a dedicated facility adjacent to the church. It was staffed by the Sisters of Mercy for much of its history. In 1924, its separate boys' and girls' schools were merged into a single coeducational K–12 school. It is today a preK–6 institution.
