= Decker Brothers =

American piano manufacturer from 1865 to ca. 1900

- Industry: Piano manufacturer
- Founded: 1865
- Defunct: Ca. 1900
- Fate: Ceased operations
- Headquarters: New York City, New York
- Key people: David Decker, John Decker
- Products: Pianos

Decker Brothers was an American piano manufacturer that operated from 1865 until about 1900. It was founded by brothers David and John Decker, holders of many piano patents. Its headquarters were located in New York City, in the John H. Edelmann-designed Decker Building, which is today on the National Register of Historic Places.

Factory on Third Avenue

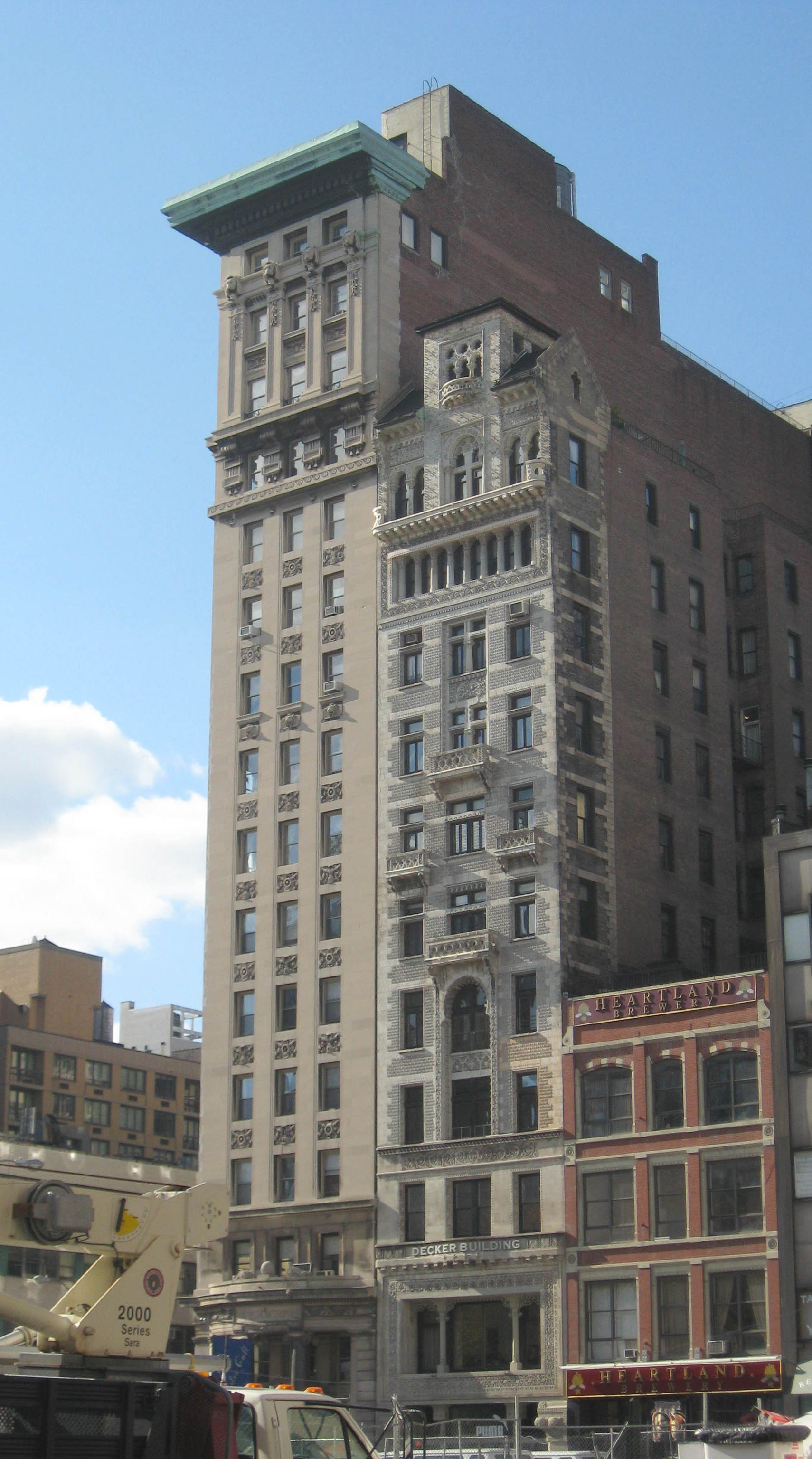
Decker Building, center

In 1878, The New York Times wrote that Decker Brothers pianos had "a wide spread and enviable reputation for their superior quality". They had typical late square action and dampers, but very good scaling ahead of its day.

The company ended its operations at the death of one of the brothers around the turn of the 20th century.

A 1996 reference guide said the pianos are of equal quality as those of Steinway & Sons and Chickering and Sons, and although they sell for less, they still command more than double the price of an average piano of that era.

In 2008, an 1874 Decker Brothers piano was said to have "the most unusual design in the bass" because the strings go under the plate at the tuning pin end with the tuning pin sticking up through a hole, perhaps to get the string coil closer to the pinblock and so to have more of the tuning pin actually in the pinblock.
