= Schiller Piano Company =

- Schiller Piano Company and Iron Water Tower Base
- U.S. Historic district – Contributing property
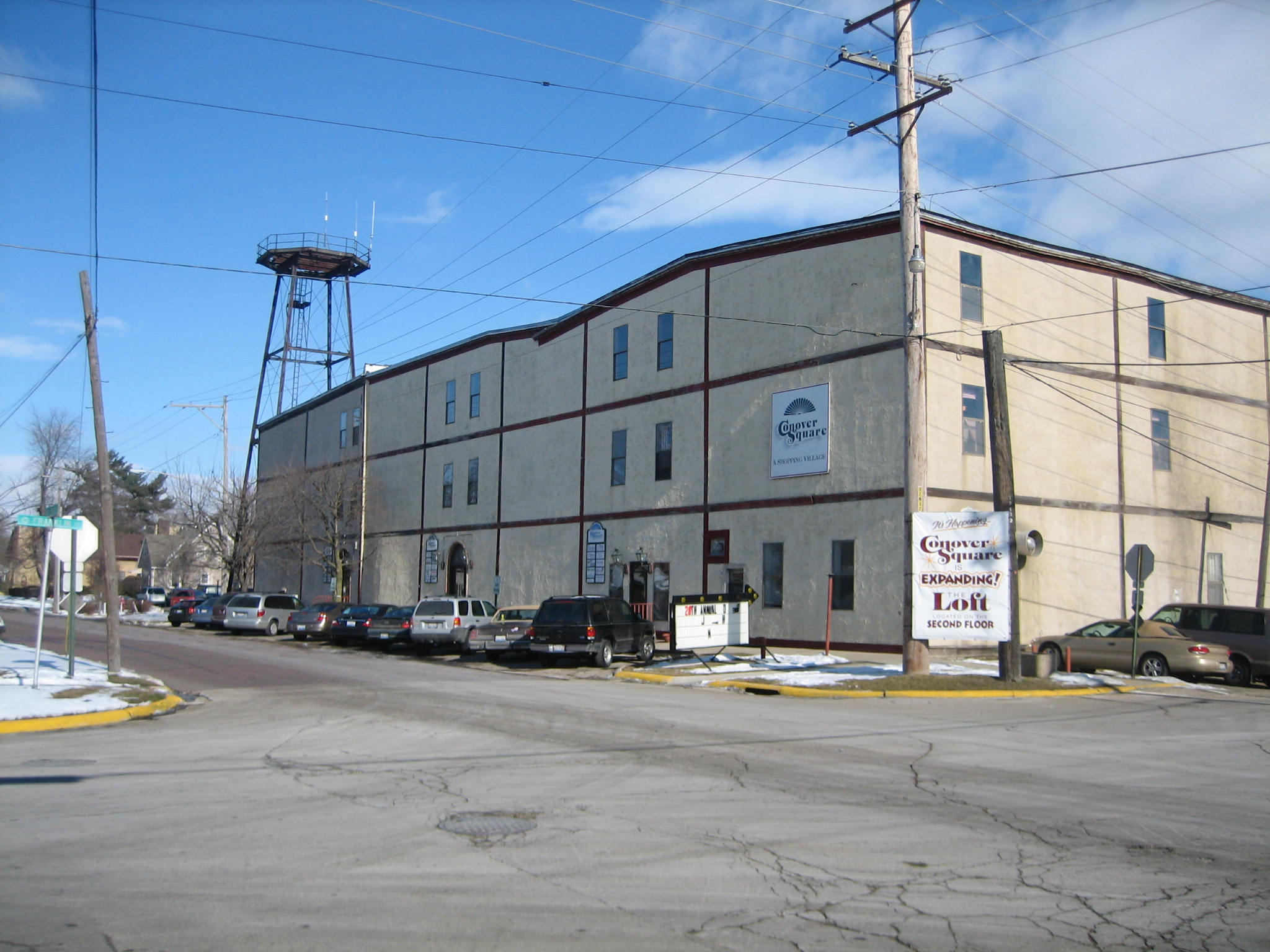
- Location: Oregon, Ogle County, Illinois
- Coordinates: 42°00′58″N 89°19′50″W
- Built: Building - 1893-1905; Water Tower - c. 1910
- Part of: Oregon Commercial Historic District (ID06000713)
- Added to NRHP: August 16, 2006

The Schiller Piano Company was an American manufacturer of pianos in Oregon, Illinois. It operated independently from 1890 to 1936, when it merged with the Cable Company and thereafter produced pianos under the name Cable and Conover. Thousands of pianos were produced in its factory, which was operated by corporate successors until 1971. The 120,000-square-foot (11,000 m^{2}), stucco-clad building was renovated for use as an indoor mall in 1975 and today operates as the Conover Square Mall.

The factory and its iron water tower base are contributing properties to the Oregon Commercial Historic District, listed since 2006 on the United States' National Register of Historic Places.

== History ==
The Schiller Piano Company was founded around 1890 at the northwest corner of Oregon's Second and Washington Streets. Its creation was financed by Oregon resident F.G. Jones. The first president of the company, Jones was not active in the company's management until 1895 when he reportedly left his well-established mercantile business to take an active position at the piano company as general manager and president of the factory. Sources conflict as to whether Jones actually left his mercantile interests behind, which included work as the president of the Oregon Electric Light and Power Company and Oregon Machine and Foundry. In addition the Schiller Company owned an interest in the Power Company and two Jones sons, George H. and Edgar B., held management positions with the firm.

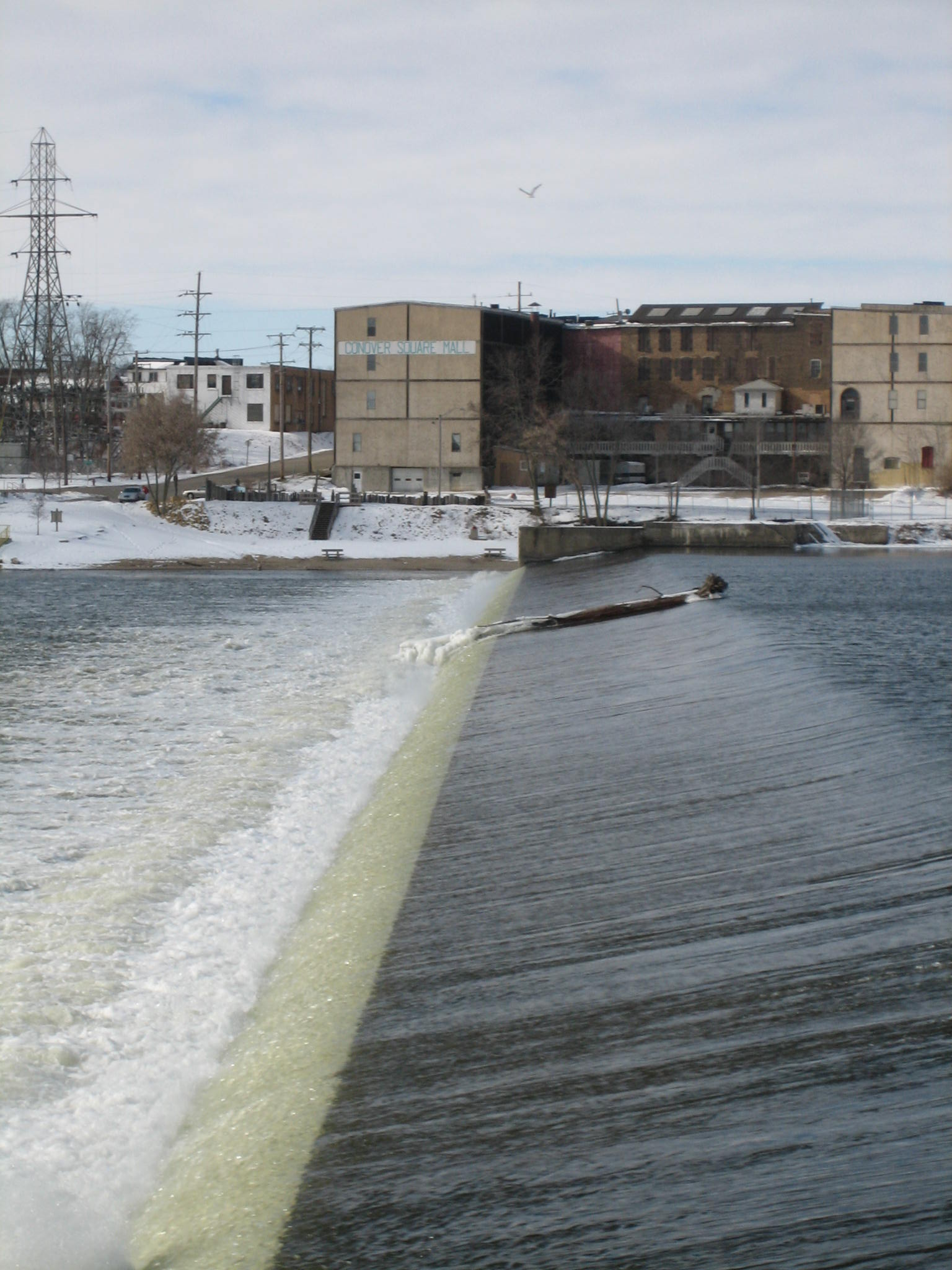
The U-shaped rear facade of the Schiller Piano Factory, viewed from across the Rock River.

Maps from 1893 show the Schiller Piano Company, identified as the Oregon Piano Company, in much smaller facilities along Franklin Street. By 1899, maps show minor expansion along the west end of the facility. Maps in 1905 show the larger, present-day factory with the original structure, identified as the Oregon Piano Factory, still extant on the building's south side.

Schiller purchased Chute & Butler piano co. and moved production to Oregon starting September 1, 1920.

Located immediately to the north of the piano company was a large, gable-roof grain elevator owned by the Neola Elevator Corporation. North of Neola was another elevator, owned by Oregon Cereal Company. Facing Third Street, standing in front of the Neola company, was an agricultural supply store. By 1913, the store had disappeared and the Schiller Company's iron water tower was erected near its former location.

In a little over ten years, the Schiller Company had clients in the United States, Canada, Hawaii and Italy; by 1909 it employed 300 people and had manufactured 40,000 pianos. The Schiller Factory had expanded into a 122,506-square-foot (11,381.2 m^{2}) facility adjoining the water power provided by the Rock River to its east. F.G. Jones died in 1913 and his sons George and Edgar took over management of the Schiller Company, which was largest industry in Ogle County.

By 1929, the company had sold a total of 80,000 pianos.

In 1936, the Schiller Piano Company merged with the Cable Piano Company and began producing pianos under the name Cable and Conover. In 1943, the old Schiller factory was sold to Winter and Company of New York City, which later became the Aeolian Company. The factory remained in operation, producing different products through the years, such as talking machines, player pianos, spinnets, baby grand pianos and pianos. Through the late 1960s, the factory employed 100 people and produced up to 6,000 pianos per year. In 1971, Aeolian closed the factory and moved its manufacturing operations to Memphis, Tennessee.

In 1975, Dean Dye of Oregon purchased the property and opened it as the Conover Square Shopping Mall. The building has since changed owners at least twice but it has remained in use as "Conover Square" and occupied by various shops.

== Architecture and design ==
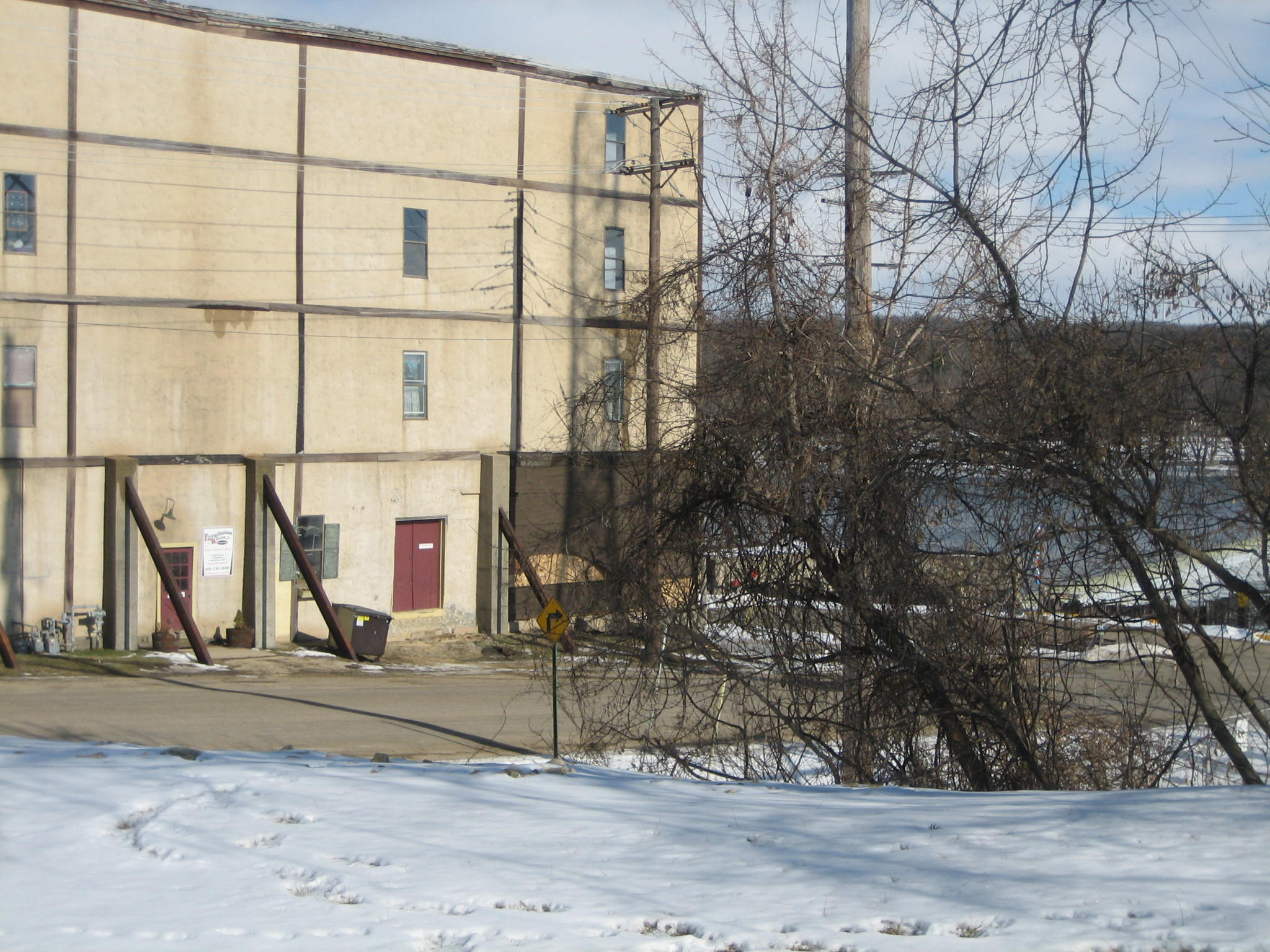
Iron buttresses support the south facade as the terrain slopes toward the Rock River.

The Schiller Piano Company factory building's rear, Franklin Street, wing was constructed in 1893. The entire 120,000-square-foot (11,000 m^{2}) industrial structure sits on the west bank of the Rock River. Around 1900 the rest of the Piano Company's main complex was added to the existing structure. The main (west) facade of the Schiller Piano Company factory building faces Third Street with no setback from the street and its secondary facade, along with the rest of the exterior, features an exposed basement because the elevation lowers as the terrain slopes toward the Rock River. The rear facade exhibits a U-shape while maintaining the exposed basement level found throughout much of the rest of the structure. The front facade features seven bays, demarcated by wooden trim between the stucco panels, entrances are located on each of the even numbered panels. The roof is an unusual multi-gabled, low pitch roof, which is still original in its form. The building features two windows over each of the entrance bays. After Dale Dye purchased the facility the stucco cladding was added to the exterior in 1977-1978, covering all original windows and walls; they remain extant beneath the stucco, and some show up in post-2005 photographs.

The building's long south facade stretches ten bays as the ground slopes toward the river. All of the south bays feature one over one single-hung sash windows on each story except for bays four, seven and eight, which are windowless. The south facade also features piers with iron buttresses as well as a third bay dock door.

The base of what was once the Schiller Piano Company's water tower remains standing on the lot's northwest corner. It is an iron base of four tiers which rises up to where the tank once sat; it was removed sometime prior to 1971. On the second through fourth stories of the base a ladder is still attached.

== Significance ==
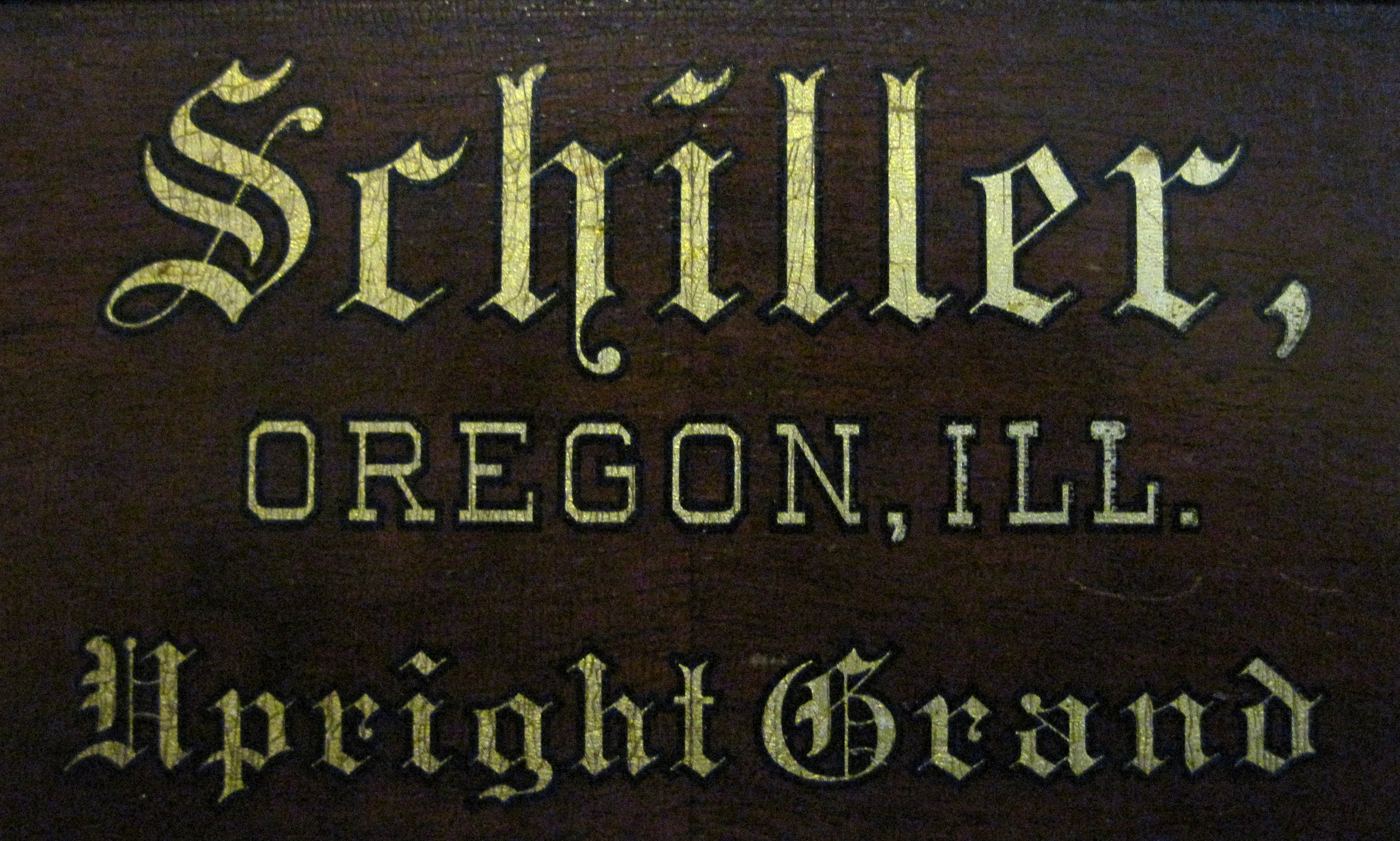
Schiller company branding on an antique piano.

The Schiller Piano Company and its Oregon factory were once the largest industry in Ogle County. After the company merged with Cable, the pianos they produced were considered top-of-the-line. Though Cable and Conover produced pianos under different brand names, those produced under the Conover name are still highly regarded today. The Schiller Piano Factory was specifically included as a contributing property when the boundaries for the Oregon Commercial Historic District were conceived in 2006. The historic district was added to the U.S. National Register of Historic Places on August 16, 2006.
