= Hobart M. Cable =

American piano manufacturer

The Hobart M. Cable Co.
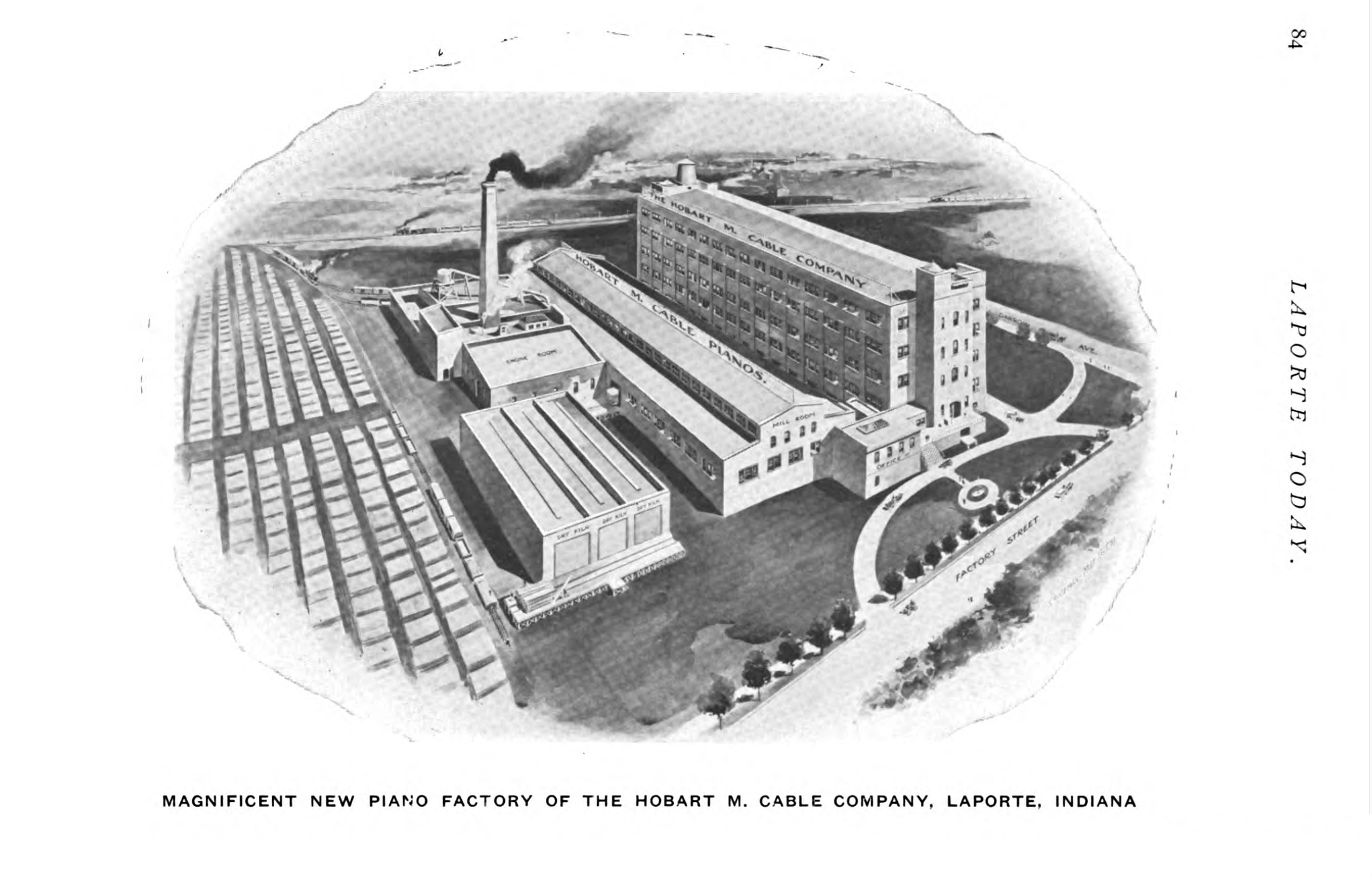
- 1904 illustration of 1901 factory in La Porte, Indiana
- Type: corporation
- Industry: musical instrument manufacture
- Founded: 1900
- Founder: Hobart M. Cable
- Defunct: ca. 1960
- Headquarters: La Porte, Indiana, United States
- Products: Pianos, reed organs
- Brands: Hobart M. Cable pianos, Burdett reed organs

The Hobart M. Cable Co. is a defunct American piano manufacturer that operated from 1900 until the 1960s, mostly in La Porte, Indiana.

From the mid-1960s until 1993, the brand name was used by Story & Clark, an even older pianomaker. From 2002 until about 2011, the brand name was used by America Sejung Corporation, a Korean-owned distributor of Chinese-made pianos.

== Hobart M. Cable Co. ==
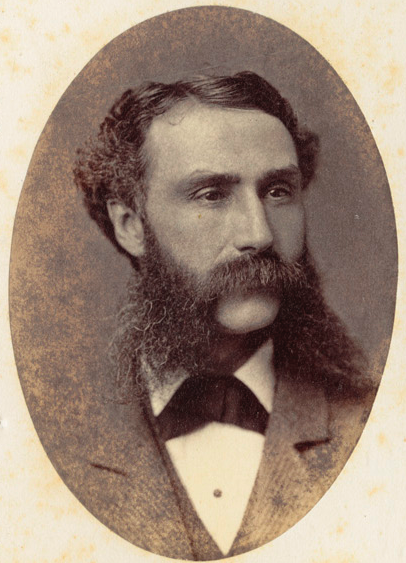
Hobart M. Cable (1842–1910)

Hobart M. Cable was born to Silas and Mary Goodrich Cable on March 3, 1842, in Walton, New York. He was a school teacher for several years before becoming school commissioner of Delaware County, New York. Cable then moved to Boston, and served in the Massachusetts House of Representatives in 1880. Later in the decade, Hobart's brother Herman Cable invited him to Chicago, where he became vice-president of the Chicago Cottage Organ Company. Along with a third brother, Fayette S. Cable, they built the company into one of the country's leading manufacturers of reed organs, pianos, and player pianos. In 1899, Herman died; the next year, Hobart left to start his own eponymous piano-manufacturing firm.

=== 1900: Founding ===
On December 8, 1900, Hobart Cable, along with his son Hobart M. Cable Jr. and Paul B. Armstrong, filed papers of incorporation with the Illinois Secretary of State for Hobart M. Cable Co.

An early hire was Howard B. Morenus, who had married Hobart's daughter Martha Strong Cable in 1893 and in 1900 was running The Cable Company's store in Atlanta. Morenus would work for three decades at the company, rising to vice-president and sales director.

In 1901, the company began making pianos at a factory at 500-510 Clybourn Avenue in Chicago. Bolstered by Hobart Cable's reputation at Chicago Cottage, sales were brisk; by year's end, the company was sending boxcars full of pianos as far as California. "Hobart M. Cable, in music trade circles, is frequently termed 'Carload' Cable. This term is applied in no spirit of levity, for Hobart M. Cable is a dignified gentleman, who has won the respect of the trade," Music Trade Review wrote in August 1901.

That same year, Cable purchased the Burdett reed organ company, including its factory in Freeport, Illinois, which was making about 5,000 organs a year. The Music Trade Review wrote, "...it is intended by the Hobart M. Cable Co. to extend the capacity of the plant so as to enable them to double that output in less than a year. It is not improbable that the capital stock of the Hobart M. Cable Co. may be increased from $100,000 to $200,000...." The company's organ business was managed by J.H. Brockmeier, who visited London in 1902 to seek export opportunities.

As 1903 began, the company's officers included Cable as president; J.H. Brockmeier, vice-president; his son Hobart M. Cable Jr., second vice-president; Morenus, secretary; and Fred L. Brockmeier, treasurer. Months later, Cable would buy out the Brockmeiers, who would create an eponymous (and short-lived) piano company that operated from 1908 to 1910 in Grand Rapids, Michigan.

In November 1903, Cable broke ground on a new piano factory in LaPorte, Indiana ("59 miles from Chicago on the Lake Shore railroad—is a delightful little city of about 12,000 inhabitants"). (In an editorial, Music Trade Review ascribed the choice of exurban location to labor unrest in Chicago.) Sited on a corner of a 70-acre plot, the factory at 1223 Factory Street and Darrow Street was completed in April 1904 at a cost of $100,000 ($3,583,333 today). Built of white brick from Michigan City, Indiana, its 200-by-62-foot main building had four stories plus a basement. Its two-boiler plant included a 250-horsepower engine. In its first year, the factory was producing 15 pianos a day and was said to have the capacity for 6,000 a year. "Mr. Cable stated to-day that the contractor has carefully followed all the specifications and that the plant is unquestionably the finest of its kind in the country," the Music Trade Review wrote.

In 1904, the company's officers included Cable as president; Cable Jr., vice-president; and Morenus, secretary and treasurer. The Chicago offices and warerooms remained at Steinway Hall at 17-21 Van Buren Street. (Later that year, Cable began his fight to prevent a saloon, backed by the Pabst brewery, from starting up near his LaPorte factory. He would eventually prevail in 1906, when the bar closed and its building was torn down.)

In 1905, the company was shipping 16 pianos and 30 organs a day.

In 1907, Cable sold the Burdett Organ Co. to S.N. Swan & Sons, longtime employees of Cable's who had earlier worked in the mechanical department of the Chicago Cottage Organ Co.

=== 1910: Presidential succession ===
In March 1910, Hobart Jr. took over as president; his father had died some time earlier ("of overwork," as Presto put it). Morenus became vice-president and Albert F. Wyman treasurer. One of Hobart Jr.'s earliest steps was to move the company headquarters from Chicago to La Porte. Morenus announced that the factory would be modified to increase its annual capacity by 1,500, and "by May 1, we will be turning out 5,000 pianos a year."

In 1917, as the United States entered World War I, the company had a 15-acre tract planted in potatoes by factory employees.

In December 1922, the company set up a "piano buyer's club" for Hammond, Indiana, in which up to 200 customers could pay a $10 membership fee, receive a piano, and continue paying the balance of the $385 purchase price (discounted from $465) in installments of $2.50 a week. "I consider the organization of this Club one of the most important business events of my life," Cable Jr. said in an ad carried in the Hammond newspaper. The deal ran from December 4 to 23. Advertisements for the company indicated that nearly 200 pianos were sold under this arrangement; they also spoke of "more than seventy thousand Hobart M. Cable pianos in use".

In 1923, the company, represented by treasurer Edwin V. Schurz, took over LaPorte's bankrupt E. A. Couterier Band Instrument Co., saving it from dissolution.

Hobart's business "rapidly declined" in 1929 and 1930, and Morenus left the company after three decades to found his own eponymous piano-making firm. In 1931, a sale of just 14 "Conservatory"-model pianos to the State Teachers' College at Hays, Kansas, was enough to draw the attention of Presto, which wrote that the firm had "not been conspicuous in piano manufacturing for some few years past".

Still, the company survived. It built player pianos during the Depression years and continued to make pianos, with a break for World War II.

In 1953, its pianos were among those sold in a new Barker Bros. piano-sales hall in Los Angeles.

It ceased operations sometime in the 1960s.

== Subsequent use of the brand ==
After Hobart M. Cable Co. shut down, the brand was transferred to piano makers Story & Clark, a venerable firm founded in 1884. Story & Clark reportedly continued making the pianos to Cable's specifications. The pianos were sold as "Hobart M. Cable by Story & Clark" into the 1980s.

In 1993, the Hobart M. Cable brand was acquired as part of the purchase of Story & Clark by QRS Piano Rolls (today, QRS Music Technologies), a company founded in 1900 by Melville Clark, then a principal of Story & Clark.

=== America Sejung ===
In 2002, the Hobart M. Cable brand was registered by America Sejung, which began selling upright pianos, console pianos and grand pianos under the name. The pianos were made in Qingdao, China, using Alaskan Sitka spruce soundboards and Japanese hammer felt, according to the company. Upright piano model numbers begin with UH, grand piano model numbers begin with GH and console models begin with CH. America Sejung also produced George Steck and Falcone pianos. America Sejung stopped selling pianos under the Cable name around 2011.
