= Xinghai =

Xinghai may refer to:

- The semilegendary "Sea of Stars" (星海; Xīnghǎi) traditionally considered the source of China's Yellow River
- Xinghai County, in Hainan Tibetan Autonomous Prefecture, Qinghai, China
- Xinghai Conservatory of Music, in Guangzhou, Guangdong, China
- Xinghai Square, in Dalian, Liaoning, China
- Beijing Xinghai Piano Group Limited, musical instrument manufacturers in China
