= Wm. Knabe & Co. =

American piano manufacturing company

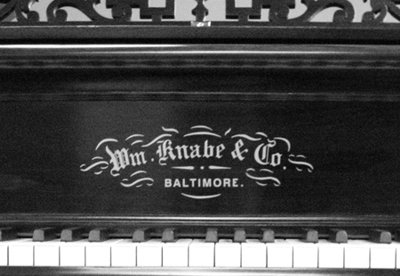
- 1884 fallboard label
- Formerly: Knabe & Gaehle
- Type: corporation
- Industry: piano manufacture
- Founded: 1839
- Founders: William Knable, Henry Gaehle
- Defunct: 1908
- Fate: Merger
- Successor: American Piano Company
- Headquarters: Baltimore, Maryland, United States
- Products: Pianos
- Brands: Wm. Knabe & Co.

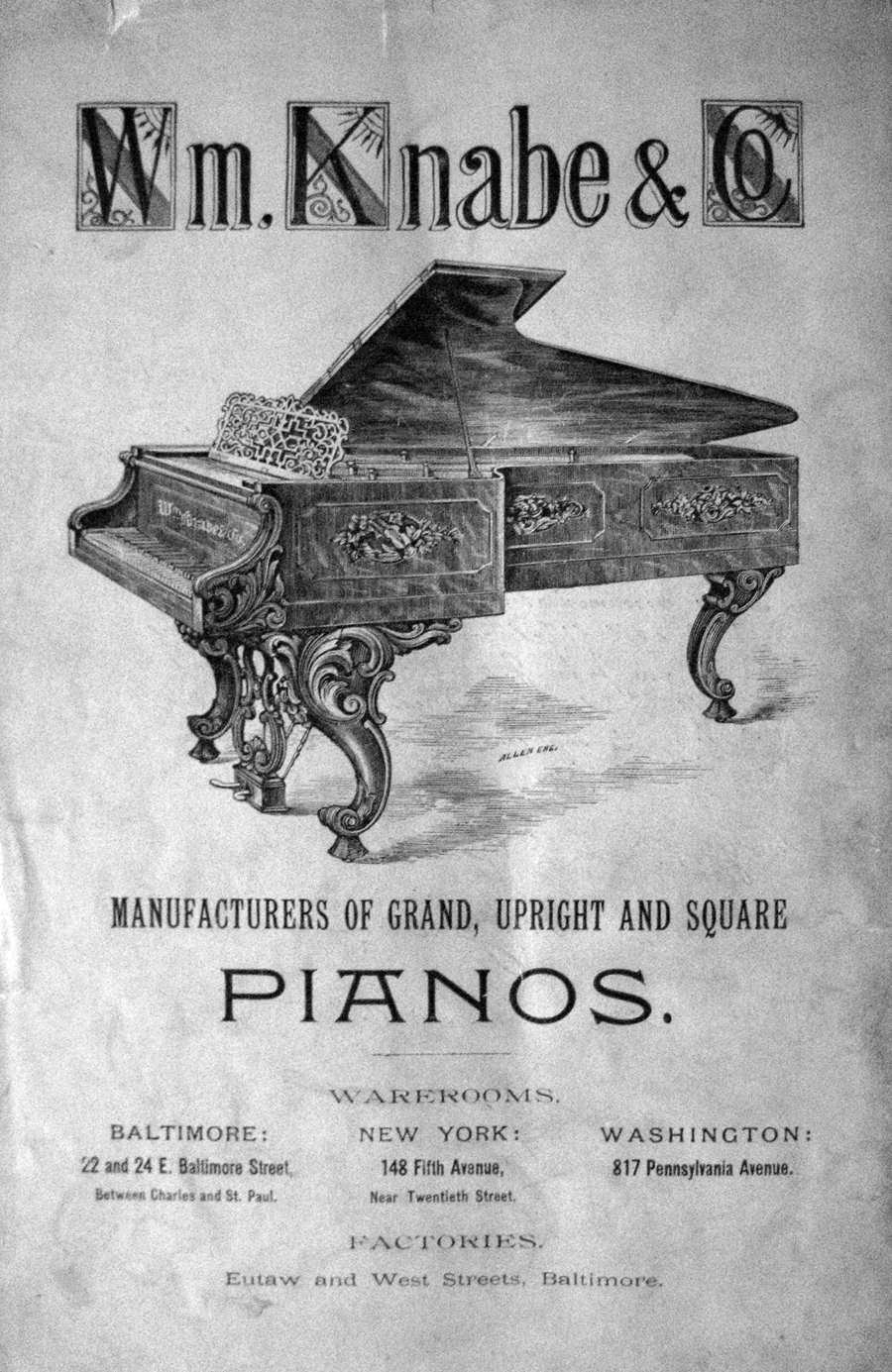
Wm. Knabe & Co. advertisement (1889)

Wm. Knabe & Co. was a piano manufacturing company that operated independently in Baltimore, Maryland, from 1855 to 1908, then as a division of the American Piano Company until 1932, then as part of Aeolian-American at East Rochester, New York, until 1982. Since 2001, the name has been owned by Samick Musical Instruments.

== History ==
=== 19th century ===
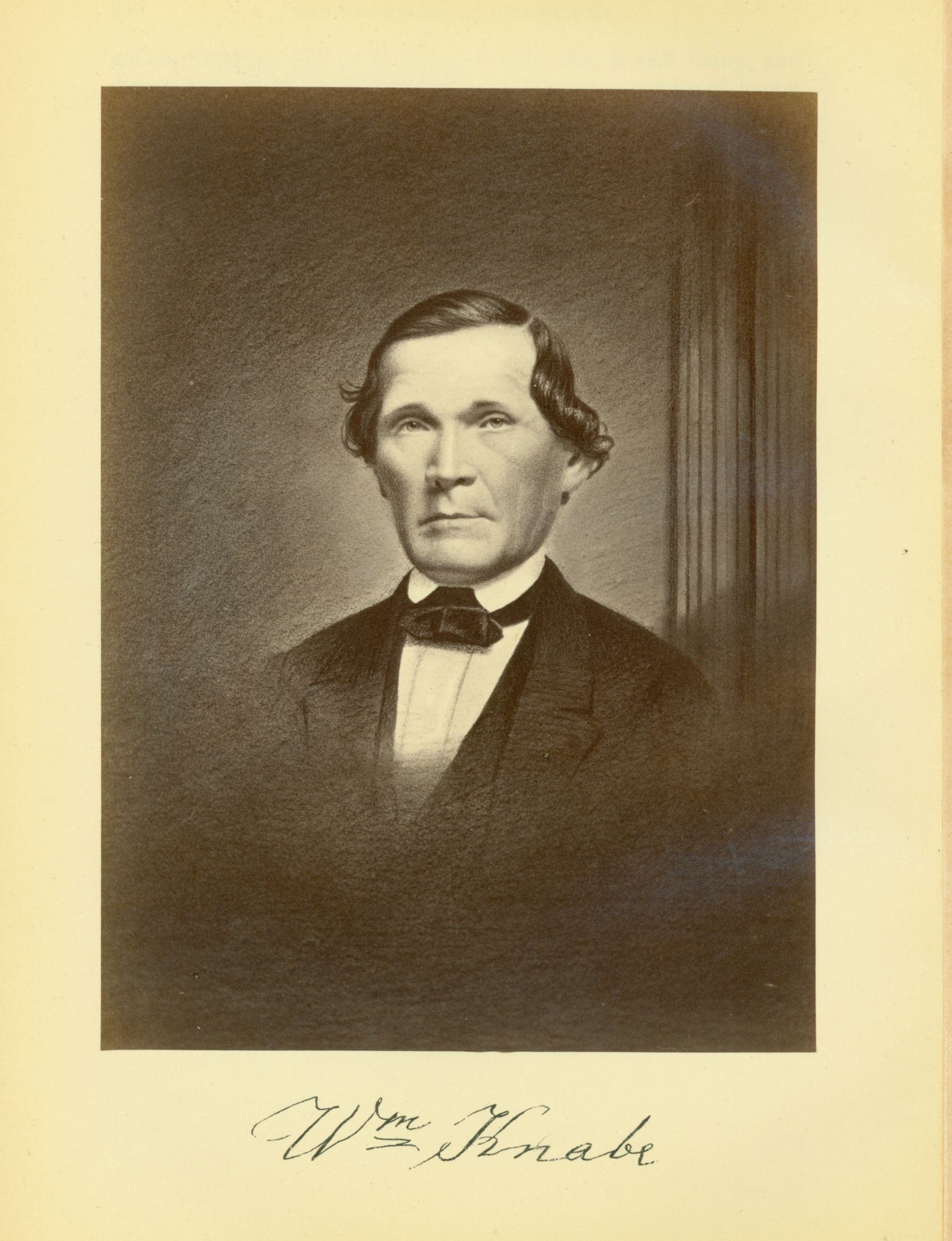
William Knabe

Valentin Wilhelm Ludwig Knabe was born in Creuzburg, Saxe-Weimar, on June 3, 1803. The French campaigns in Germany in 1813 prevented him from studying to become an apothecary like his father, and instead he apprenticed with a cabinet maker, after which he worked two years as a journeyman cabinet maker, then for three years for a piano maker in Gotha, before working as a journeyman piano maker in different cities in Germany.

In 1831, Knabe accompanied his fiancée's family when they emigrated from Saxe-Meiningen to the United States, but the head of the family died during the voyage and Knabe and his bride remained in Baltimore instead of continuing to Hermann, Missouri, where a brother had settled several years earlier. Knabe worked for the well-known pianomaker Henry Hartge, and eventually abandoned his plans to become a farmer. In 1831, he started selling and repairing used pianos from his house at the corner of Liberty and Lexington Streets.

==== Knabe & Gaehle ====
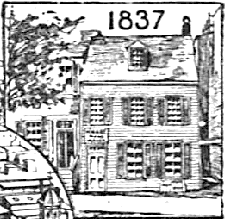
Original factory (1837)

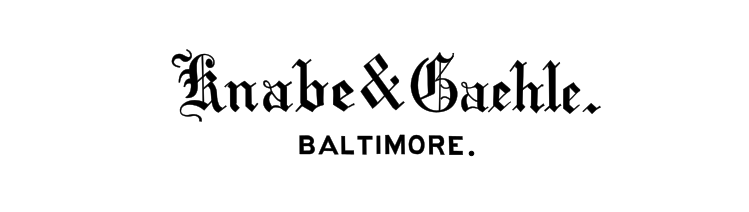
Nameboard label, before 1855

In 1839, Knabe formed a partnership with Henry Gaehle to make pianos; within two years, they moved to larger workshops at 13 South Liberty Street. In 1843, they opened warerooms at the corner of Eutaw Street and Cowpen Alley, and four years later removed their warerooms to 9 Eutaw Street, opposite the Eutaw house, selling pianos priced between $180 and $400. By 1852, they had expanded to 4, 6, 8, 9 and 11 Eutaw Street. Knabe & Gaehle won first premiums for square pianos from the Maryland Institute for the Promotion of Mechanic Arts in 1848, 1849, and 1850, and for grand pianos in 1849.

In 1852, the company reorganized as Knabe, Gaehle & Co. with the admission of Edward Betts as partner, and by 1853 advertised their establishment was the largest in the South, employing over 100 workmen. They manufactured six- to seven-octave pianos with "a double action, like Chickering's", selling for between $200 and $500.

In November 1854, their factory at Cowpen Alley at the rear of Eutaw House burned, at an estimated loss of $190,000, and five weeks later their factory at Baltimore street near Paca Street burned, reportedly with little insurance coverage.

==== Wm. Knabe & Co. ====
Proceedings started early 1855 in order to dissolve the partnership. Henry Gaehle died, and Knabe advertised that he had purchased all the remaining stock and materials and would continue in business as Wm. Knabe & Co. at the old stand at 1, 3, 5, and 7 North Eutaw Street, opposite the Eutaw house. William Gaehle, who had become the senior partner, advertised that he was in business as Wm. Gaehle & Co., manufacturing grand and square pianos at the corner of Pratt and Green streets and with warerooms at the corner of Eutaw and Fayette streets.

Knabe purchased a former paper mill at the corner of West and China streets for a new factory, and by 1859 had established warerooms at 207 Baltimore street. He won gold medals for square pianos from the Maryland Institute in 1855, 1856, 1857 and 1858; silver medals from the Metropolitan Institute in Washington, D.C., in 1857; a medal from the Franklin Institute in Philadelphia in 1856; and first premiums from the Mechanics' Institute in Richmond, Virginia, in 1855 and 1856.

In 1860, Knabe started building a five-story factory on Eutaw and West streets, but had only completed one of its wings at the outbreak of the American Civil War, which compelled them to seek new trade in the West to make up for the loss of their principal market in the South. William Knabe died on May 21, 1864, and was succeeded by his sons William and Ernest J. Knabe, and son-in-law Charles Keidel.

In 1866, Wm Knabe & Co. introduced their agraffe treble, a piano whose agraffe was threaded into a heavier piece of brass instead of directly into the iron frame.

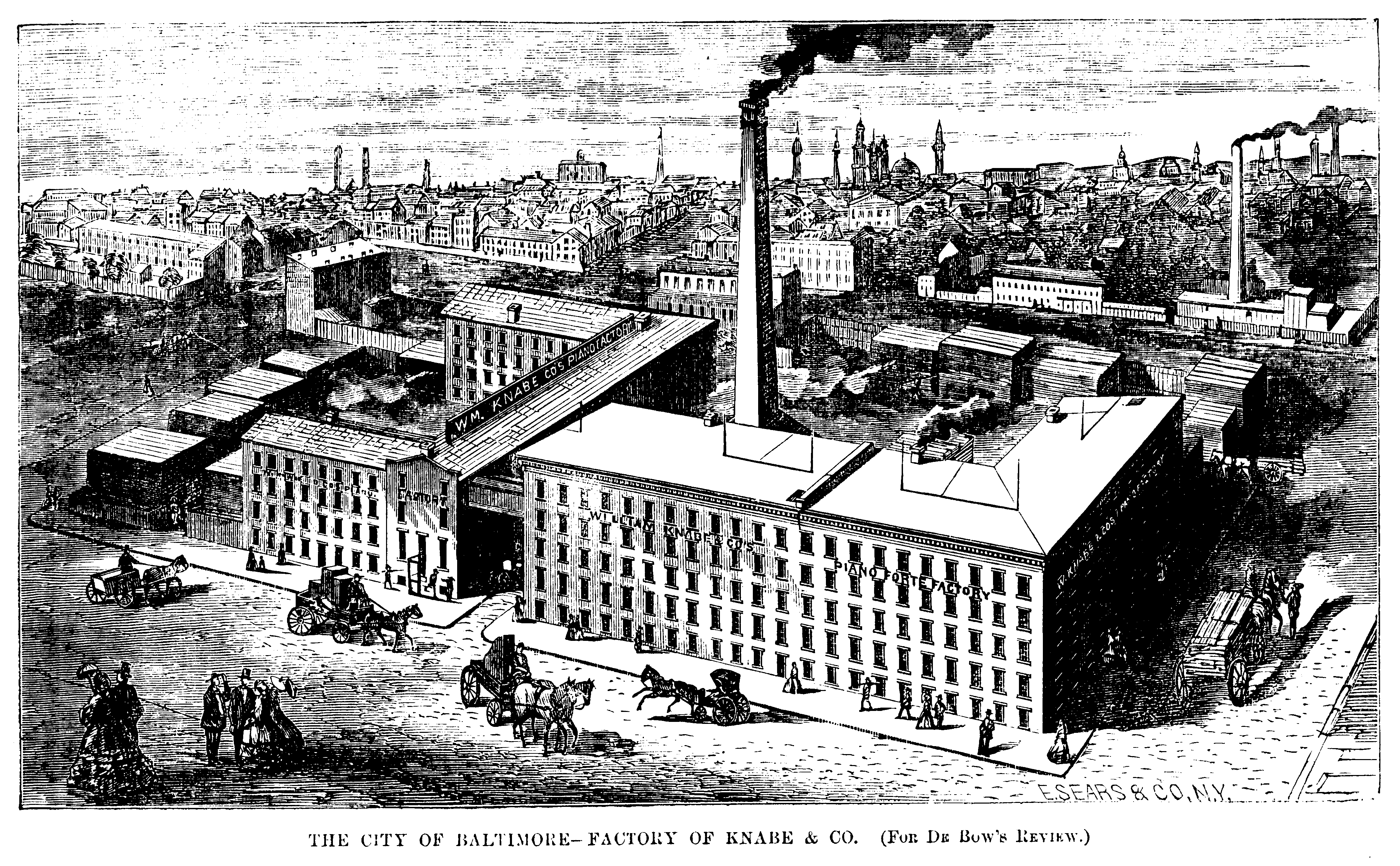
1866 illustration of Wm. Knabe & Co. factory at Eutaw and West Streets in Baltimore

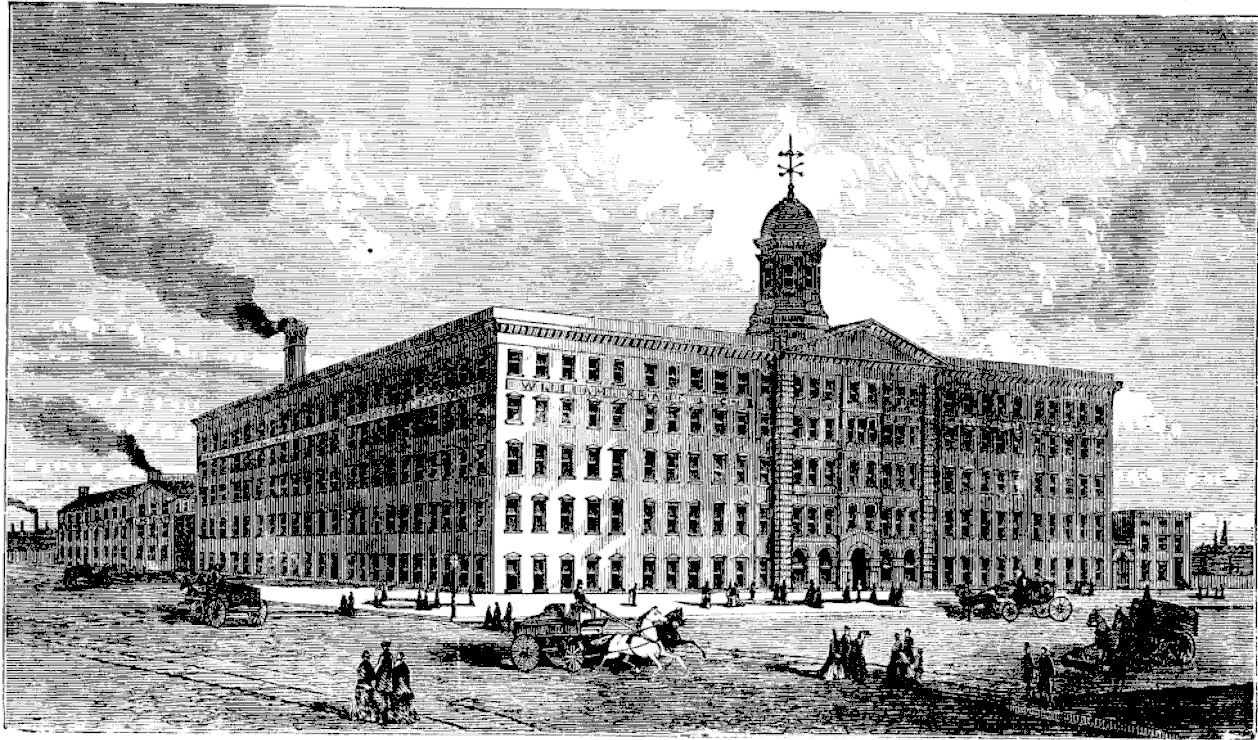
1872 illustration of factory

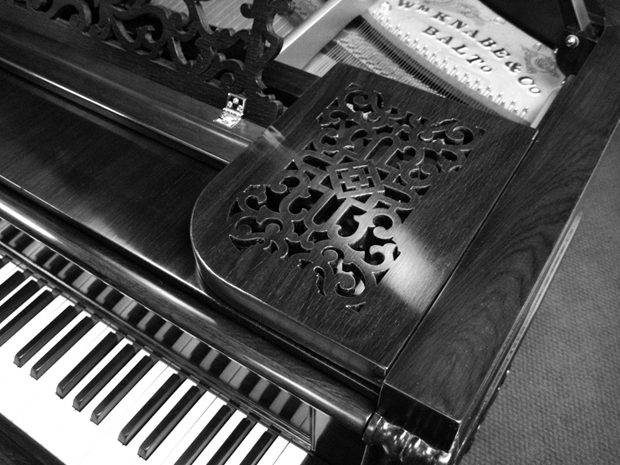
Music rack detail, Knabe grand ca. 1884

By 1866, the company employed about 230 workmen and manufactured about a thousand pianos a year,—up to 30 a week—including uprights, squares, and grands. The factory was equipped with a 30 horsepower (22 kW) steam engine, as well as steam-powered elevators and drying rooms, and had been augmented with a second 40-foot (12 m) wide building where grand cases, sounding boards, and actions were manufactured and cases varnished and iron frames gilded. Further additions and a cupola completed the factory, which in 1869 fronted 210 feet (64 m) on Eutaw Street and 165 feet (50 m) on West Street. Their sales ranked third in the United States, after Steinway & Sons of New York and Chickering & Sons of Boston, and by 1870 their output was estimated to be about forty pianos a week, priced between $600 and $2,000.

In 1873, Wm. Knabe & Co. established their own warerooms at 112 Fifth Avenue in New York. They exhibited grand, square, and upright pianos as well as a Tschudi & Broadwood harpsichord at the 1876 Centennial Exposition in Philadelphia, and due to the revised awards system they claimed highest honors along with many of their coexhibitors. In 1882, they delivered a rosewood concert grand to the White House for President Chester A. Arthur. William Knabe, jr., died in 1889. The company was incorporated with a capital stock of $1,000,000 the same year, with Ernest J. Knabe as president.

Ernest J. Knabe died in 1894 and was succeeded by his sons, both of whom had trained at the factory. Ernest J. Knabe, jr. was elected president and William Knabe, vice president and treasurer.

=== 20th century ===
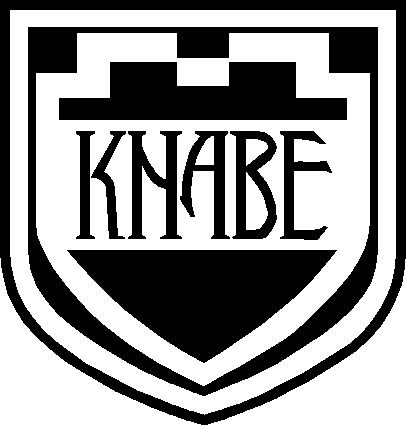
Shield emblem used after 1904

By 1902, Wm. Knabe & Co. had established agencies in Canada and England, and had mortgaged the factory for capital to fund further expansion. By 1906, the factory occupied seven buildings with the original buildings extensively expanded, with a total of about 300,000 square feet (28,000 m^{2}) of carefully planned floor space and 765 employees. Although the plant included modern appliances such as individually powered machines and a dust-collection system connected to the boiler, Knabe advertised their standards required their pianos to be carefully handcrafted, so that a plain upright took six months and a grand two years to complete.

==== American Piano Co. ====
In 1908, Wm. Knabe & Co., with Chickering & Sons and the Foster-Armstrong Co., of East Rochester, New York, formed the American Piano Co. under the laws of New Jersey, headed by Ernst J. Knabe Jr., president, and C. H. W. Foster of Chickering & Sons, and George G. Foster, of Foster-Armstrong, controlling their respective companies as well as Haines Brothers, Marshall & Wendell, Brewster, and J. B. Cook & Co. with a combined output of about 18,000 pianos a year.

==== Knabe Brothers ====
Ernest and William Knabe resigned their positions in 1909, and following a series of business troubles in New York they incorporated Knabe Brothers in Ohio in 1911, with offices at Cincinnati, manufacturing upright and grand pianos at a factory formerly owned by the Smith and Nixon piano company in nearby Norwood, "free from the yoke of a commercialism that figured out pianos by square inches of wood and decimal points in the allotment of wires". American Piano Co. filed suit over the use of the name, but the resulting injunction only prevented Knabe Brothers from using their original nameboard label and required the brothers to indicate this was a new company. The plant burned in January 1912, but they quickly resumed production at a temporary factory before building a modern factory on the old site. The company went into receivership late in 1916 on account of an unpaid loan, and the brothers declared bankruptcy by the end of the year.

Ernest J. Knabe died in 1927 and William Knabe in 1939.

==== Ampico ====
In 1927, Wm. Knabe & Co. removed their New York warerooms from 437 Fifth Avenue at 39th Street to 657 Fifth Avenue, corner of 52nd Street, and in 1928 moved to Ampico Tower at Fifth Avenue and 47th Street as part of American Piano Co.'s move to consolidate the sales of all their brands in an unsuccessful attempt to make up for a sharp decline in profits. American went into receivership in 1929, and Knabe's liabilities were listed as $286,000 and assets $415,000.

In 1930, American's assets were purchased by the American Piano Corporation, newly incorporated under the laws of Delaware, whose officers included former executives from American as well as executives from the Aeolian Company. The Knabe factory was closed, as well as the Chickering factory in Boston, and their production ultimately transferred to East Rochester, New York, where they were established as separate divisions. The old factories, including Mason & Hamlin in Boston and the Amphion in Syracuse, New York, were put on the market.

==== Aeolian-American ====
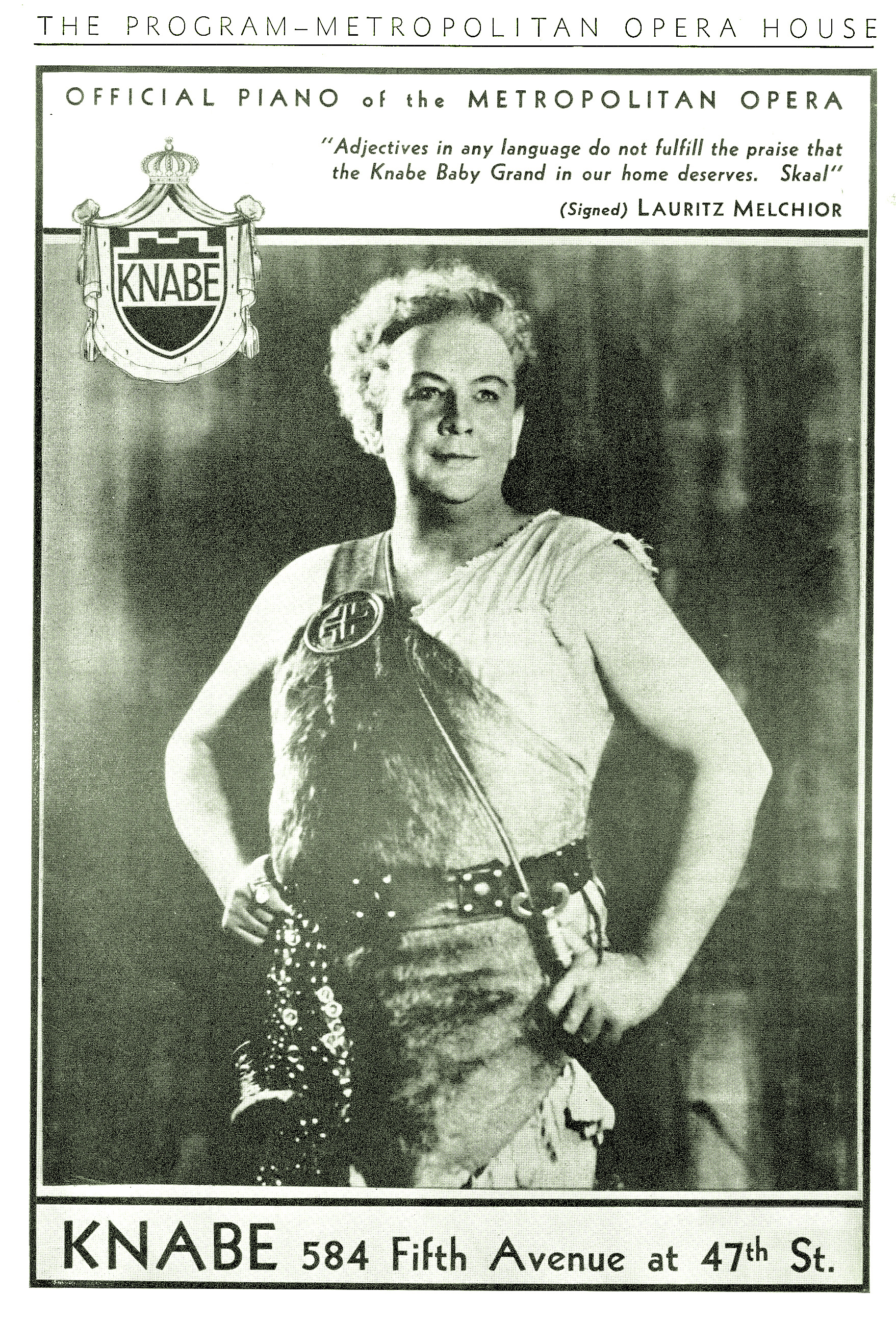
1935 Knabe ad as the "Official Piano" of the Metropolitan Opera

In 1932, the American Piano Co. merged with the Aeolian Company, Aeolian-Weber's piano subsidiary, to form the Aeolian American Corporation which consolidated the control of more than 20 piano brands, as well as action manufacturing and plate casting divisions. In 1936, it ranked as the fourth-largest producer in the country, after Kimball, Baldwin and Winter & Co.

Berthold Neuer, who had been vice president and general manager from 1927 died in 1938, and his successor Richard K. Paynter died in 1940.

In 1942, the East Rochester factories were contracted to manufacture military aircraft parts, keeping the plants and personnel in operation, but by late 1949 piano production returned to full capacity. The Aeolian Company and the American Piano Corporation recapitalized and merged with the Aeolian-American Corporation in 1951, and in 1957 was purchased by the owners of Winter & Co., based in Bronx, New York.

By 1981, the combined divisions at the East Rochester factory employed about 300; it closed the following year.

==== Sohmer & Co. ====
In 1985, Sohmer & Co. purchased the Knabe and Mason & Hamlin trademarks and their patterns and equipment from Citicorp Industrial Credit Co., Aeolian's principal creditors. Sohmer & Co. had planned to resume production of the existing models from both divisions but was itself sold and the companies reorganized with Sohmer and Knabe as subsidiaries of Mason & Hamlin.

=== 21st century ===
In 2001, Samick Musical Instruments, Ltd.acquired the name Wm. Knabe & Co. from PianoDisc.

In early 2006, Samick Music Corporation, distributor for Samick in the United States and Canada, announced it had started building a 210,000-square-foot (20,000 m^{2}) distribution center and factory in Gallatin, Tennessee, where they planned to manufacture Knabe and J. P. Pramberger lines beginning in that year or the next. In 2007, Knabe pianos were offered in vertical and grand models. Vertical pianos came in three sizes: a 119 cm (47 inches) in three furniture case styles, as well as 121 cm (48 inches) and 131 cm (52 inches) models. Grand pianos came in four sizes: three case styles each of 158 cm (5 feet 3 inches) the WKG53, 173 cm (5 feet 8 inches) the WKG58, 193 cm (6 feet 4 inches) the WKG64, and 215 cm (7 ft) WKG70 models.

Elvis Presley's white 1912 Knabe was auctioned on eBay on August 10–20, 2017.

In the late 20th century, the abandoned Baltimore Knabe factory at Eutaw and West Streets was razed to make way for the Baltimore Ravens' football stadium. A mosaic on the sidewalk at the southwest corner of the stadium depicts a keyboard and honors the Knabe legacy. The cupola atop the factory now stands on the grounds of the Baltimore Museum of Industry.
