= The Cable Company =

U.S. keyboard instrument manufacturer

Coordinates: 41.8520°N 87.6690°W

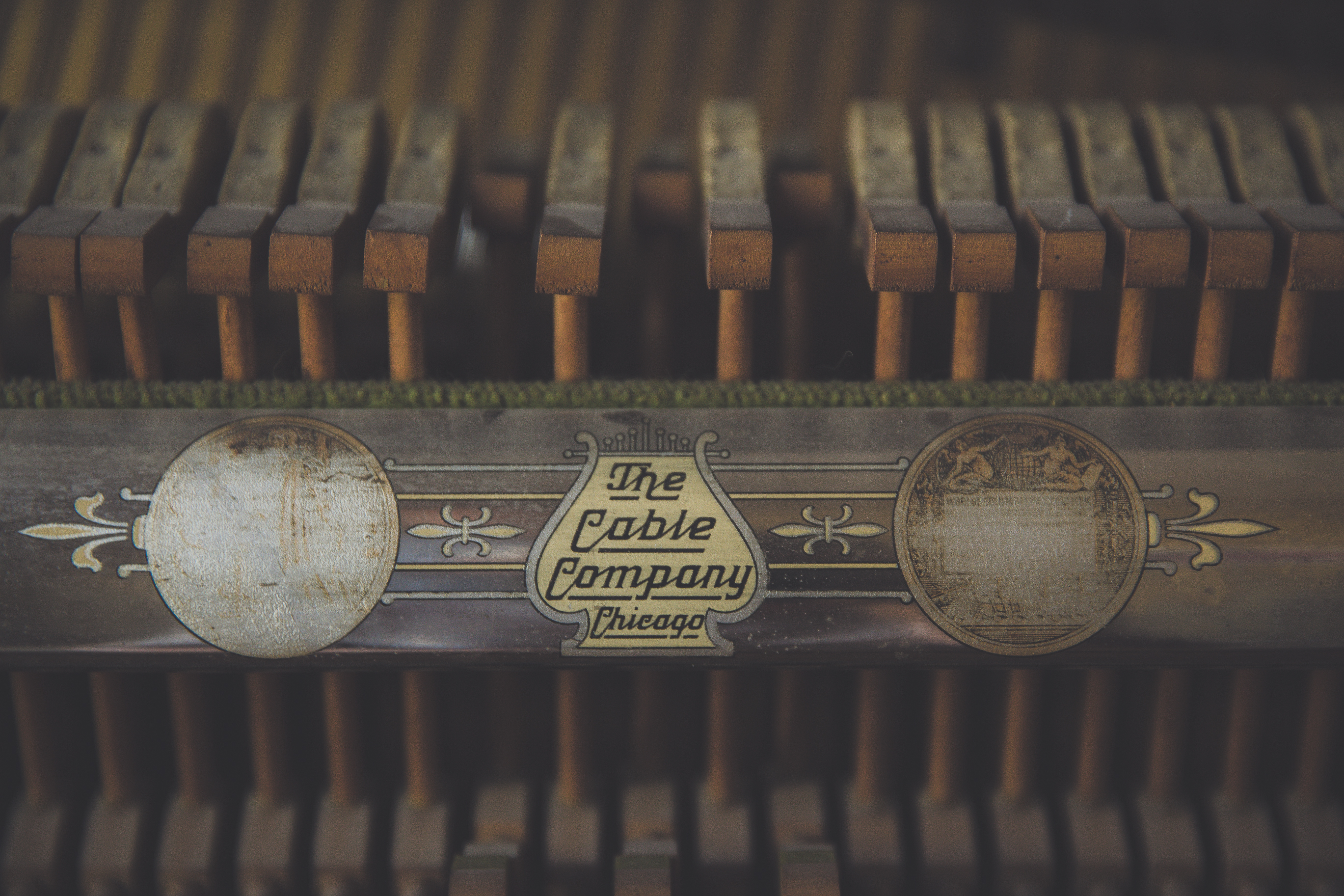
- The Cable Co.'s label inside a piano
- Formerly: The Chicago Cottage Organ Company
- Type: corporation
- Industry: musical instrument manufacture
- Founded: 1880
- Founder: Herman D. Cable
- Defunct: 1936
- Fate: Merger
- Successor: The Schiller Cable Manufacturing Company
- Headquarters: Chicago, Illinois, United States
- Products: Pianos, reed organs
- Brands: Conover, Cable, Kingsbury, and Wellington pianos; Carola, Solo Carola, Euphona, Solo Euphona, and Euphona Reproducing Inner-Player player pianos; Chicago Cottage reed organs
- Number of employees: Ca. 500 (Ca. 1905)

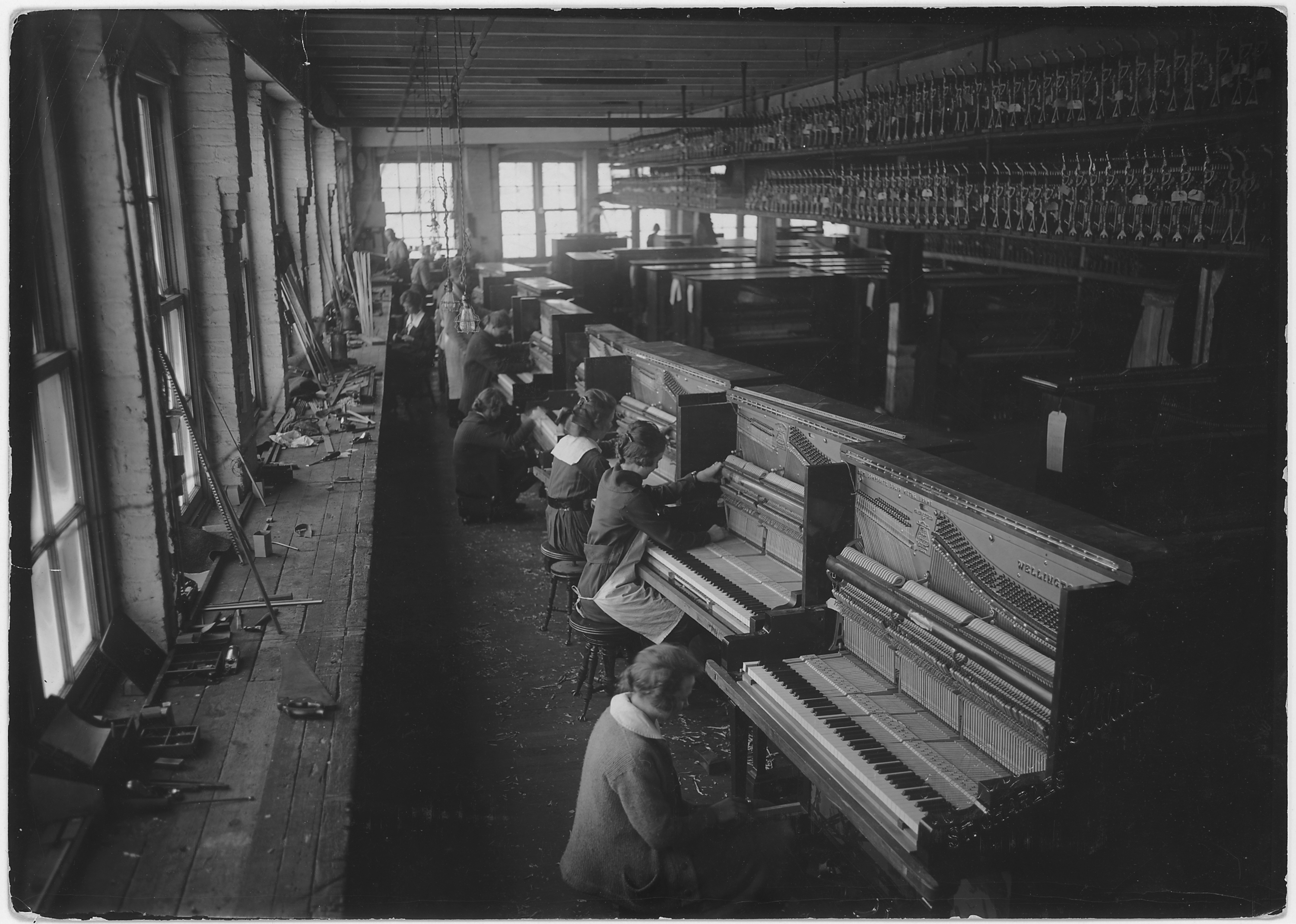
Employees at one of The Cable Company's two factories fit keys to Wellington brand pianos around 1918.

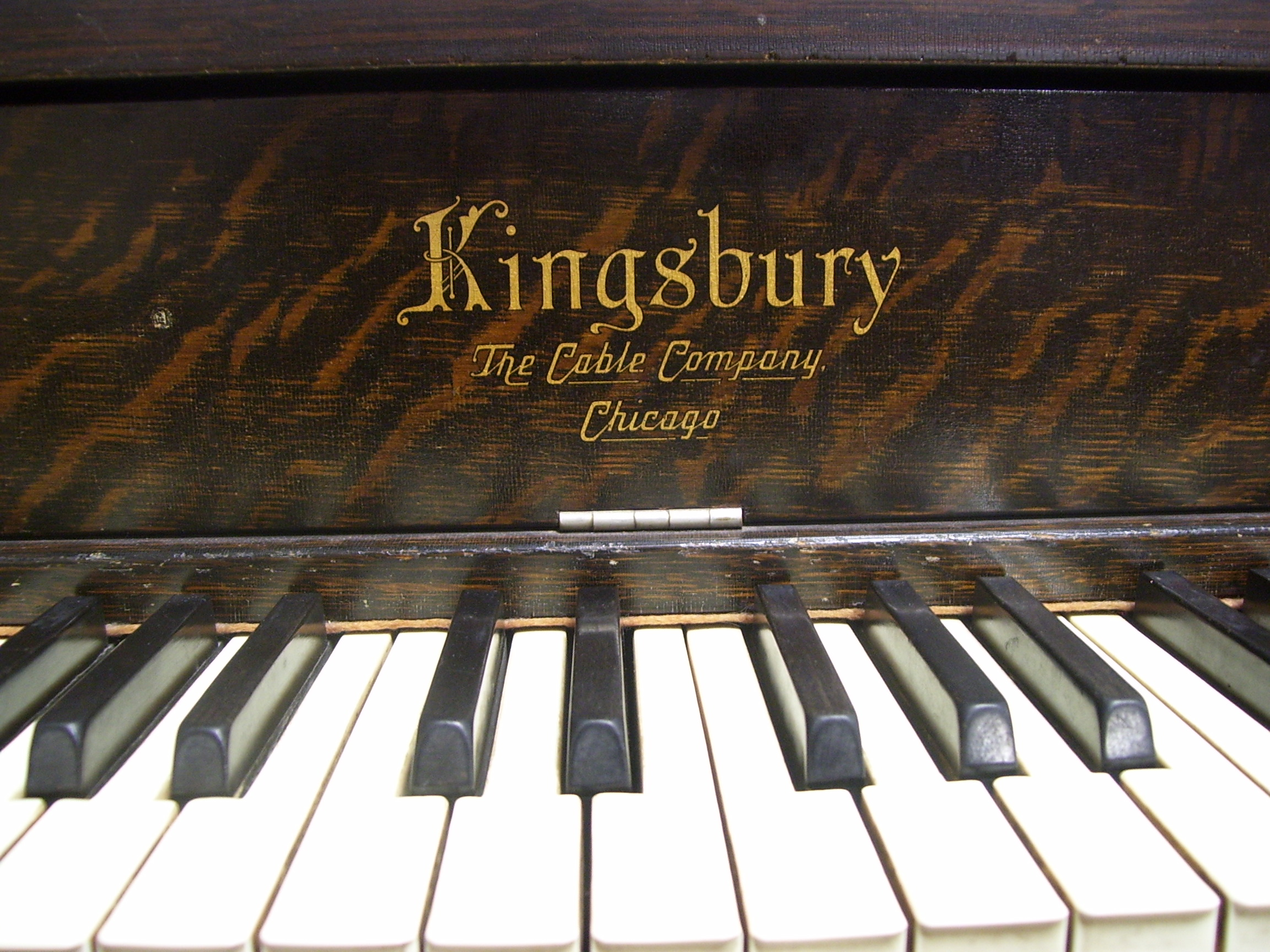
Kingsbury was one of the many brands produced by the Cable Company.

The Cable Company (earlier, Wolfinger Organ Company, Chicago Cottage Organ Company; sometimes called by the name of its subsidiary, The Cable Piano Company) was an American manufacturer and distributor of pianos and reed organs that operated independently from 1880 to 1936.

Headquartered in Chicago, Illinois, the company proclaimed itself "the world's greatest manufacturer of pianos, inner player pianos, and organs". It was indubitably one of the largest, and maintained that status for several decades during the apogee of U.S. piano sales, the so-called Golden Age of the Piano. Trade publications of its day called it "the largest reed organ house in the world, and the largest wholesaler in the world of medium-grade pianos" (1895); "the largest piano and organ makers in the world" (1904); and "one of the 'great leaders' in the trade" (1922). Its premium Conover line of pianos was described as belonging to "the highest grade manufactured".

The decline of the piano market in the late 1920s followed by the Great Depression forced The Cable Company to merge with another northern-Illinois piano maker in 1936, becoming The Schiller Cable Manufacturing Company. In 1950, the merged company was subsumed into the Aeolian Company, which closed in 1984.

== History ==
=== Early years ===
Herman Cable (June 1, 1849-1899), born on a farm in Walton, New York, to Silas and Mary Goodrich Cable, was a student of such precociousness that he was at age 17 elected school principal in Easton, Pennsylvania, and a year later appointed superintendent of schools in Williamsport, Pennsylvania. He later got a job in New York City with the publishing house of Barnes and Co., which in 1869 (or 1870) sent him to Chicago to manage the western department.

In the fall of 1879, Cable joined (or helped found, sources differ) the Wolfinger Organ Co. Cable served as treasurer and director, along with F.R. Wolfinger, president, and John A. Comstock, secretary. Its offices and factory were in a three-story building at Randolph and Ann (today, Racine) Streets, owned by New York financier Hetty Green and familiarly known as the Coan & Ten Broek carriage-factory after a previous occupant. A fire on April 18, 1880, caused damage initially estimated at $15,000 to $20,000, which was largely if not entirely covered by insurance.

The Wolfinger factory made small reed organs—"cottage organs"— but it also turned out furniture, sewing machine tops, elevator cabs, and more. After Cable arrived, the Wolfinger company began to separate out its various products; the furniture business, for example, would wind down by 1883.

=== Chicago Cottage Organ Co. (1880-1899) ===
In 1880, the subsidiary that made reed organs was named Chicago Cottage Organ Co.

In 1885, the company added two partners: E.E. Wise and George W. Tewksbury, experienced organ makers who had worked for the Western Cottage Organ Co. of Ottawa, Illinois. Williard Naramore Van Matre, Sr. (1851–1939) joined as sales manager and a stockholder; he would stay for 10 years before leaving to start the Straube Piano Company.

On March 12, 1886, another fire broke out in the factory at Randolph and Ann, this one gutting the building and destroying more than 2,000 organs in various states of completion. "Cable estimated the damage to the stock to be $50,000 and to the machinery $25,000. The company carried $40,550 insurance, carried by several companies," the Chicago Tribune reported. Most of the company's 174 employees were kept on as the company improvised workspaces in the neighborhood. Lots were purchased on January 8, 1887, and a new plant constructed on the southwest corner of Paulina Street and 22nd Street (today's Cermak Road).

Wolfinger sold his interest in the company to G.K. Barnes, who would himself divest in 1889. Cable became president after he and Tewksbury bought Wise out. Cable also brought his piano-making brothers into the business: Fayette S. Cable (b. March 18, 1855, in Cannonsville, New York; d. February 22, 1920, in Hinsdale, Illinois) and Hobart M. Cable. Both continued to make pianos under their own names.

By 1889, the Chicago Cottage Organ Company was building its own pianos; that year, it made 200 under the name of Chicago Cottage Piano. Still, its main interest in pianos was as a wholesaler of medium-quality instruments made by other companies.

==== 1891: Conover Piano acquired ====
In 1891, Herman Cable made an acquisition that would help vault his company into the first rank of American piano manufacturers, and enable it to offer some of the finest pianos made. He bought the Conover Piano Company and hired its owner and main designer, J. Frank Conover (b. 1843 in Mount Morris, New York; d. May 20, 1919). A serious student of music and acoustics from a young age, Conover had produced his first piano in 1875 and four years later opened a store with his brother George in Kansas City. He subsequently opened a piano store in St. Louis, where one fine day, he sold five Steinway grands and two Steinway uprights. In 1881, he sold both stores and began to design pianos in New York City. His pianos, made with several improvements that he earned patents for, were soon renowned for their fine quality and unusually good tone. But the firm struggled, and Conover was persuaded to sell the business to Cable and sign on as its director of piano manufacturing. He would remain with the company until his death in 1919.

In January 1892, the Conover Piano Company began operating as a subsidiary with a Chicago factory at Lake and Peoria Streets. Herman Cable became the president of the Conover firm as well as of the Chicago Cottage Company (whose other officers were Hobart Cable, vice-president; Fayette Cable, secretary; and Tewksbury, treasurer). The acquisition would turn "the enterprise into the largest wholesale and retail trade-in pianos and organs in the world."

Ten years into its independent existence, Herman Cable's company was riding a boom that would later be called the Golden Age of the Piano. As household income rose in the years before radio, recorded music, and automobiles became widely available, households and organizations alike purchased pianos and reed organs in prodigious amounts. In 1889, Chicago manufacturers produced some 6,760 pianos; in 1891, 10,900; and in 1892, 13,600. (The country's total estimated production in 1892 was 100,000 pianos, most made by manufacturers in and around New York City and Boston.) The city's production of reed organs was even higher: 46,000 in 1889, 49,300 in 1890, and 55,000 in 1892. Many of them were made by Chicago Cottage Organ Company, which in 1892 produced one-fifth of all U.S.-made reed organs.

They were produced at the Paulina Street factory, the "most extensive reed organ manufactory in the world." A sales catalog from the late 1890s boasted of its "three immense buildings" with more than three acres of flooring, plus smaller structures, lumber yards, and more. "Five steel boilers, with an engine of 350 horse power, furnish the necessary power to run more than 100 different kinds of machines, which are of the latest improved patterns and many of them especially designed for our work," the catalog said. At any given time, some 4,000 organs were in various stages of production, with 2,000 completed sets of internal workings on hand, while 600 to 800 completed organs stood ready for quick shipping. The company reckoned it could produce 18,000 organs a year, or one every 10 minutes, should the public demand it.

In 1893, Chicago Cottage and Conover Piano Company exhibited five organs and nine pianos in their double booth at the World's Columbian Exposition, joining dozens of other organ and piano manufacturers in their city's coming-out party.

By 1895, the company had built and shipped some 150,000 organs. A catalog issued during this period advertised 25 models of reed organ. On May 1, the company opened a new factory for Conover pianos next to the Paulina Street organ factory; it was soon producing 2,000 pianos annually. It also expanded into several floors of the Ayer Building (built in 1890 or 1893 as the A. H. Andrews Building) at 215-221 (S.) Wabash Ave. in Chicago. The seven-story building was leased by the Conover Piano Company, which occupied half of the bottom floor while Chicago Cottage Organ Co. used the second floor. (The building would be destroyed on March 16, 1898, in a deadly fire that injured a Conover employee. The company moved down the street to 258 and 260 Wabash.)

Around this time, the company hired Justin Percival Sjoberg to run its Kingsbury production line, which he did for eight years before leaving to found a piano-parts making company. Sjoberg went on to found another company that focused on coin-operated and automated pianos; it became the mammoth Seeburg Corporation.

Herman Cable had become a prominent member of Chicago's business and social community; an 1895 capsule biography notes that he belonged to the Masons, Knights Templar, the Chicago Union League, and the Country Club of Evanston. He had married Alice A. Hutchins of Chicago in 1883; together they had three children and lived in Evanston.

In 1899, the Chicago Tribune took note of "a daylight special train-load of sixteen cars filled with Kingsbury, Cable and Conover Pianos and Chicago Cottage Organs," shipped by the Erie Railroad to a distributor in Binghamton, New York. "There is no better indication of the prosperous times in our country than by the extensive sale of Pianos and Organs," the Tribune wrote. "This is said to be the largest single shipment of Pianos and Organs ever made at one time and shows the rapid strides Chicago is making in the Music Industry."

In 1899, Herman Cable died, and Fayette Cable took over as president.

Alfred Dolge, a fellow piano manufacturer, described Herman Cable's approach and impact in his 1911 book Pianos and Their Makers:

"Cable applied the methods used in selling books, as far as possible, to the organ and piano business, with amazing success. Like [fellow pianomaker William Wallace] Kimball, he was a born organizer and an excellent judge of men and their abilities. The training which he had enjoyed in the bookselling business impelled him to introduce system in his manufacturing and selling organization, with all that this word implies in modern business management, and perhaps he was the first in the piano industry to profit by the application of scientific accounting. At all events, his success was so rapid, and his business assumed such immense proportions, that it became the wonder of his contemporaries."

=== The Cable Company (1900-1935) ===
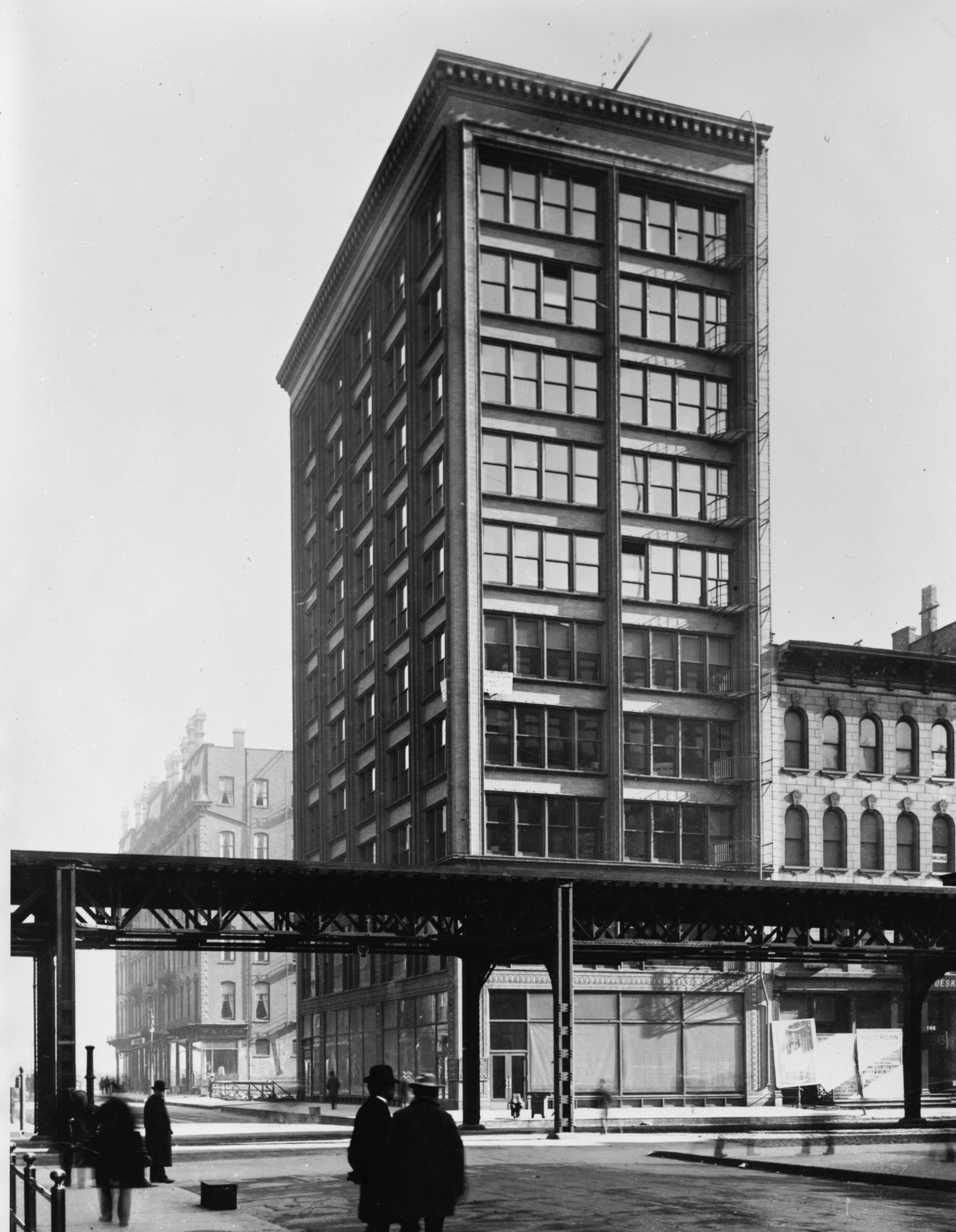
From 1900 to 1933, the Cable Company's headquarters and main showroom were in its eponymous building on the southeastern corner of East Jackson Boulevard and South Wabash Avenue in Chicago's Loop area, seen here ca. 1900. Its address was initially given as 57 East Jackson Boulevard, then in the 1920s, as 300 S. Wabash.

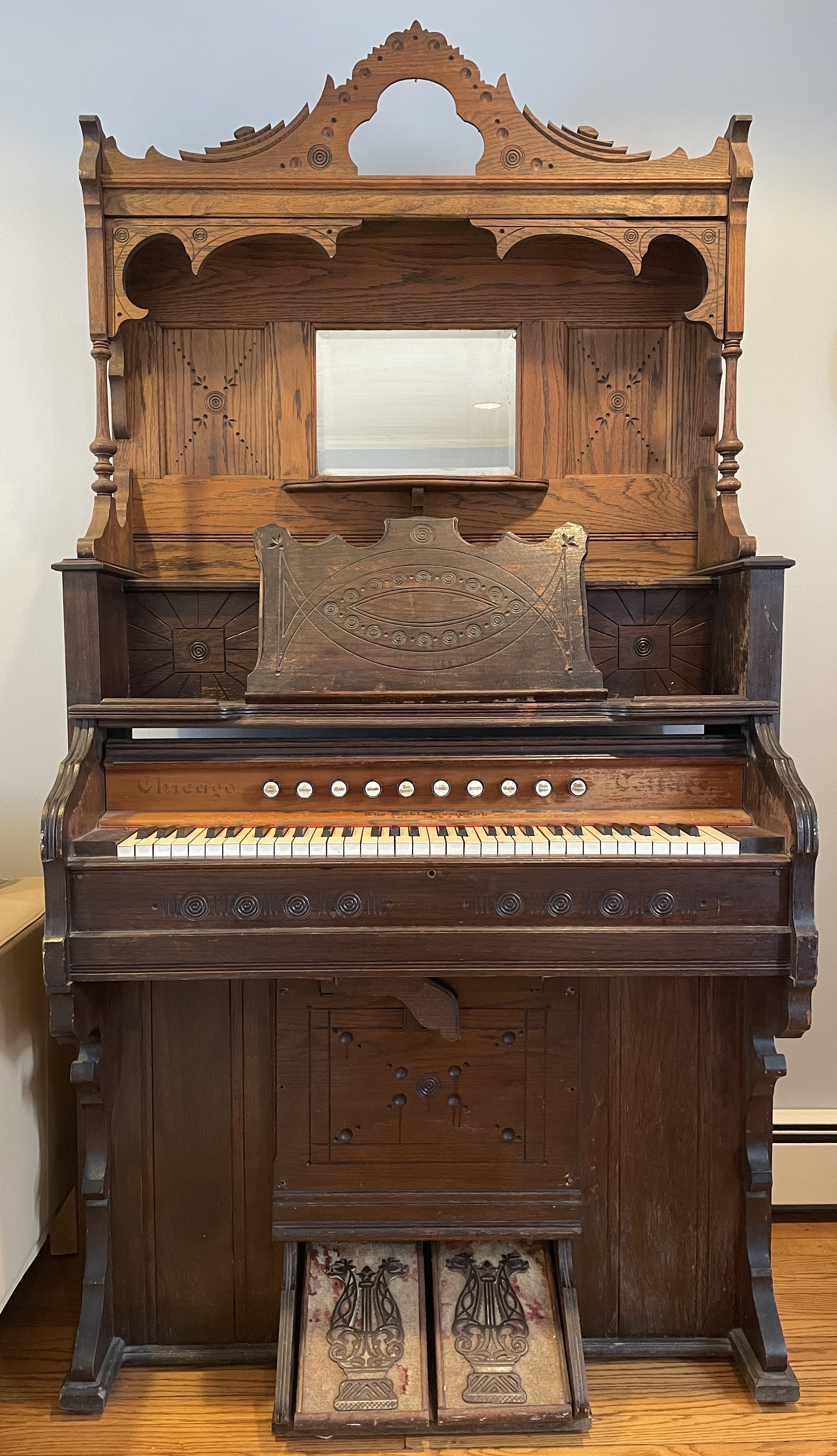
A 1902 Chicago Cottage Style 96 reed organ

The first year of the 20th century brought a new name—The Cable Company, changed on March 5—and a big new headquarters and showroom in Chicago's Loop area. In 1900, the company leased the brand-new 10-story building at 57 East Jackson Boulevard (on the southeastern corner of E. Jackson and Wabash Ave.). Designed by Holabird and Roche, it became known as the Cable Building during the company's 33-year tenure. The area around this block of Wabash, home to many musical-instrument manufacturers and vendors, became known as Chicago's "Music Row." No vendor's sign flew higher than "Cable Pianos".

A sales brochure issued around this time offered 29 styles of reed organ with different designs and varying numbers of stops. The company numbered its organs with serial numbers: e.g., No. 43315 (made in 1892), No. 118189 (1894), No. 250783 (1907), and 260834 (1910).

1900 also saw the departure of Hobart Cable, who purchased the Burdett Organ Co. in La Porte, Indiana, and renamed it the Hobart M. Cable Co. The firm would operate until the 1960s; brand licensing would keep new pianos bearing the Hobart name late into the 20th century.

==== 1901: A second factory ====
In 1901, the company built a second factory about 43 miles west of downtown Chicago in the city of Saint Charles, Illinois. The complex, at 410 South 1st Street, had its own electric plant, and its location near the Fox River and the Chicago and North Western Railroad allowed it access to materials and components from around the world.

"The Cable factory gave St. Charles an international flavor. Ivory for piano keys came from India and Africa. Wool for the hammers came from Australia. Rich wood veneers were imported from Mexico, South America and the gold coast of Africa. In return, Cable distributed its pianos all over the world and had dealers in Spain, Italy, British East Africa, Japan, Australia and other key foreign places."

The factory would be expanded in 1904 and 1909, to 5.7 acres of workspace on 11 acres of land. Lumber yards stored up to 11 million board-feet of wood.

During the factory's heyday there were as many as 500 employees. Known for "its favorable working conditions," the factory offered employees the opportunity to "enjoy the company-sponsored brass band, choir, exercise classes, or play on the company baseball team." After World War I, many of them were women. The plant would ultimately produce 35 pianos a day—nearly 13,000 a year—and bring the company's annual production capacity to 16,000 pianos and 18,000 organs.

==== 1903: Frank Shaw era ====
In 1903, Fayette Cable stepped down as president of the Cable Company. The last of the company's namesake family to lead the firm, he subsequently bought the Lakeside Piano Company and the Sweetland Piano Company, added a partner, and in 1905 would rename his firm the Cable-Nelson Company. Over the next 16 years, it would ship a total of 125,000 pianos.

The Cable Co.'s new president was Frank S. Shaw, a prominent elder in the Presbyterian Church. He took control of a vigorous company still hungry for growth. In 1904, Cable Co. was spending more than $100,000 a year on advertising and "increasing its output in every way possible in order to meet the demand." In February, the company acquired a majority interest in Mason & Hamlin, a struggling Haverhill, Massachusetts-based piano company, in large part so it could use Mason's factory in New York state to manufacture pianos for the New York City market. (Cable would sell its interest in 1924 to the American Piano Company.) The company also considered opening a new factory in or near Atlanta; its factories were already consuming nearly all the wood veneer produced by a plant in Dublin, Georgia.

A week after the Mason & Hamlin purchase was inked, the company threw a banquet for its top 60 officers and branch heads ("a superb one, complete in every essential detail from blue points to cigars", the Music Trade Review reported). Officers in attendance at the Stratford Hotel included Conover, President Shaw; Jonas M. Cleland, vice-president; H. L. Draper, secretary and treasurer; D. G. Keefe, mechanical superintendent; Frank T. Heffelfinger; Tewksbury; H. A. Ware; F. B. Wells. The breadth of the company's sales can be seen in the list of the branches represented: Atlanta; Cincinnati and Toledo, Ohio; Detroit; Jacksonville, Florida; Knoxville, Tennessee; Marinette, Wisconsin; Minneapolis and St. Paul, Minnesota; New Orleans, Louisiana; and Richmond, Virginia.

The year also saw the company enter the emerging market for player pianos. The first practical pianola—a piano that could use pneumatic means to play music from rolls of perforated paper—had been developed in 1895 and subsequently produced and marketed by the Aeolian Company. In 1904, the Cable Co. added a department to make its own player pianos, hiring inventor-manufacturer-salesman Paul Brown Klugh to design them and run the department. Klugh held patents on the Carola and Euphona models, and at the Buffalo Convention of 1910, he would help lead the player-piano industry to standards that would allow rolls to be played on any manufacturers' instruments.

The company also sold some 20 pianos that were installed in various State buildings at the 1904 World's Fair in St. Louis, Missouri.

By year's end, leading trade publications ranked the company among the world's top piano producers. The Presto-Times declared it "the largest piano and organ makers in the world". The Music Trade Review listed the company first among leading piano manufacturers, calling it "a great institution which has exercised a potent influence on the music trade of this country" with its "immense wholesale business" and "practically twenty retail stores situated in all parts of the United States."

A merger floated in early 1905 would have further padded the company's lead. In March, the Wall Street Journal reported that a $5 million merger would combine Cable Piano and its Mason & Hamlin subsidiary with the Bush & Gerts Piano Company and the Strohber Piano Company. The deal was said to be pushed by George W. Peavey, a director of the Cable Company and its principal stockholder. Peavey, whose father had invented the concrete grain elevator, owned the Peavey Grain Company of Minneapolis, Minnesota. (His fellow directors were the company president, Shaw; Heffelfinger, heir to another grain fortune; Wells; Cleland; Ware; R.E. Walker; and D.G. Keefe.)

The merger did not happen, but Cable took over the Chicago-area sales of pianos made by Bush & Gerts, including the company's showrooms in the Bush Temple of Music at 100 W. Chicago Avenue. (This arrangement would last just two years; Bush & Gerts would return to Chicago-area sales and the Temple of Music in 1907.)

That same month, Cable expanded its presence on Music Row by leasing the four-story building at 244 South Wabash Avenue, which adjoined its headquarters building to the south. A renovation created a first-floor recital hall with a Mason & Hamlin pipe organ; two second-floor showrooms, one for Conover grand pianos and one for Mason & Hamlin grands; a third-floor showroom for uprights, and a fourth-floor library and repair shop. It also connected the two structures along the Cable Building's freight elevator.

In 1906, the company reached the apogee of its reed-organ production capability: 24,000 per year.

That year, U.S. pianomakers sold about 280,000 pianos, including about 20,000 player pianos. Sales slumped the following year, though the number of player pianos sold grew to about 22,000. In mid-1906, Klugh predicted the industry would sell about 250,000 pianos, about one-tenth of which would be player pianos.

In 1908, the prices for the company's player pianos were: Conover inner-player piano, $900; the Corona inner-player piano, $750, the Kingsbury inner-player piano, $650, the Euphona inner-player piano, $500.

==== 1913: George Dowling era ====
In 1913, George Dowling, a sales specialist who joined the company as vice-president in 1908, was elected president. Klugh, the player-piano expert, became vice-president and a director; he would within two years debut the "Solo-Carona Inner-Player," a player piano whose novel mechanism allowed for more control of dynamics and accent.

A 1915 advertisement offered to reimburse train fare to the company's Chicago showroom upon purchase of a piano. Around 1916, The Cable Company produced some 8,000 pianos: 7,000 by the Conover factory and another 1,000 in the Mason & Hamlin factory.

A 38-year era came to an end in 1918, when the company ceased its production of reed organs. But it had picked up other areas of trade. In 1916, the Cable Company purchased the Percy S. Foster Piano Company, a piano dealership in Washington, D.C. (The store, at 1330 G Street NW, had once supplied four Conover Baby Grands for $750 apiece to the Washington Herald, which gave them away as contest prizes.) It operated a "small goods" supply featuring musical instruments produced by the Gretsch and Martin companies. It dabbled in music publishing, issuing editions of "The One Hundred and One Best Songs" in 1915 and 1922, selling thousands to school districts around the country. During the Great War and into the 1920s, it also donated song sheets—with advertisements for its instruments to community-music programs at civilian-military preparedness camps.

In 1922, The Purchaser's Guide to the Music Industries called the Cable Co. "One of the largest, most distinguished, enterprising and wealthy concerns in the piano and player-piano industries" and said it was "recognized as one of the 'great leaders' in the trade." Its pianos were sold by "a large number of branch houses and hundreds of agencies" including ones in "the principal cities of Europe, Asia, Africa, and Australia". Its Conover pianos were noted as belonging to "the highest grade manufactured".

In 1924, the company had a store in Knoxville, Tennessee, but had closed its store in Chattanooga.

In May 1928, during the 27th annual convention of the National Association of Music Merchants at the Hotel Commodore, Dowling presided over the annual Cable Breakfast, a banquet for its dealers, their families, and other friends of the company at the nearby Hotel Biltmore. But the company was not listed among the exhibitors at the convention itself.

In 1929, the Cable Piano Company had several regional-headquarters stores outside Chicago, including in Atlanta (84 North Broad street), Detroit (1264 Library Avenue), Minneapolis (Nicollet Avenue at Eighth Street), and Toledo (209 Superior Street).

The arrival of the phonograph in the early 1900s and commercial radio in the 1920s had exerted steadily growing pressure on piano makers. Total U.S. sales for the industry had peaked around 300,000 in 1924, representing roughly $100 million in revenue ($1,880,000,000 today). But sales decreased steadily thereafter. In the final year of the Roaring Twenties, piano makers sold an estimated 115,000 instruments. In a sign of the times, Cable's Chicago showroom had begun selling radios, including the Erla screen grid radio from Electrical Research Laboratories at 22nd and Paulina.

The 1929 stock market crash hit the Cable Company hard. Within weeks of the crash, near Thanksgiving, the company laid off workers at St. Charles factory. The ensuing Great Depression weakened the entire industry further. By 1932, when the nation's pianomakers sold just 27,000 pianos, the key-finishing department at Cable's St. Charles factory shrank to just one employee. By 1936, the sprawling complex held only five or six employees, most to repair pianos.

=== Merger and aftermath (1936 and beyond) ===
In 1936, the Cable Company merged with the Schiller Piano Company of Oregon, Illinois, to become the Schiller Cable Manufacturing Company. The St. Charles factory was closed on Jan. 7, 1937, and sold to the W.H. Howell company, which made furniture there until 1980. The building reopened in May 1986 as the indoor Piano Factory Outlet Mall, whose outlet stores included Corning, American Tourister, Carter's, Pfalzgraff, and Anchor Hocking. It was foreclosed upon and closed in 1997, then razed in September 2000 to make way for a residential development. The site is now occupied by condominiums and mixed-use buildings.

The Schiller Cable Manufacturing Company continued to produce pianos branded as Cable and Conover at the Schiller factory in Oregon. Like most of the country's musical-instrument manufacturers, it halted production during World War II. In 1943, the company was taken over by Winter and Company, another piano manufacturer, and William G. Heller became its president. On December 1, 1945, the Schiller Cable Manufacturing Co. was renamed the Conover-Cable Piano Co. In 1947, it was one of just seven piano manufacturers left in Illinois.

In 1950, Winter & Co. was merged into the Aeolian Company, which sold pianos under the Cable brand until 1958, the Conover brand from 1960 to 1965, and the Conover-Cable brand until 1982. Aeolian went bankrupt in 1984, leaving just four major piano manufacturers in the United States and bringing a final end to the company Herman Cable founded 104 years earlier.

The Conover Cable brand name, however, survived into the early 21st century. Samick, a South Korean manufacturer of musical instruments, trademarked the name in 1997 and used it in some markets for pianos sold elsewhere under the Samick brand. By 2010, pianos bearing the name Conover Cable were available only by special order. In 2012, Samick stopped selling pianos under the name.

== Brands ==
=== Reed organs ===
The company manufactured and sold organs under the brand name of "Chicago Cottage" from 1880 to 1918. It also produced "stencil organs"—organs for sale under other companies' brand names—for many music dealers, such as Capital City Organ Co. in Lansing, Michigan; Bell in Saginaw, Michigan; Grinnel Brothers in Detroit; and Temple Organ in St. Louis.

In 1890, Herman Cable helped found Collins & Armstrong in Fort Worth, Texas, which sold Chicago Cottage organs under its own stencil until 1892, when it began selling them under the Chicago Cottage brand. In 1899, the company became Cable Piano Company.

=== Pianos and player pianos ===
The Cable Company produced pianos under various name brands. Some it invented; others it acquired, including Conover and Wellington. (The Wellington Piano Case Company Building is on the National Register of Historic Places in Leominster, Massachusetts.) Here are some snapshots of the company's product line at various points in its history:

Chicago Cottage Organ Co. (1890–99)

- 1889: Chicago Cottage
- 1891: Conover, Gabler, Kingsbury, and Schubert
- 1899: Cable, Conover, Kingsbury

The Cable Co. (1900-1936)

- 1921: Cable, Conover, Kingsbury, and Wellington pianos; Carola, Solo Carola, Euphona, Solo Euphona, and Euphona Reproducing Inner-Player player pianos

Conover-Cable Piano Co. (1945-1950)

- 1945: Cable, Conover, Kingsbury, Schiller, and Wellington pianos

Aeolian (1950-1984)

- 1950-1958: Cable
- 1960-1965: Conover
- 1950-1982: Conover-Cable

Samick (1958–present)

- 1997-2011: Conover Cable (Note: Samick was granted a trademark on the name in 1997; it is unclear whether the mark was transferred from Aeolian or merely registered anew.)
