= Wellington Piano Case Company Building =

- U.S. National Register of Historic Places
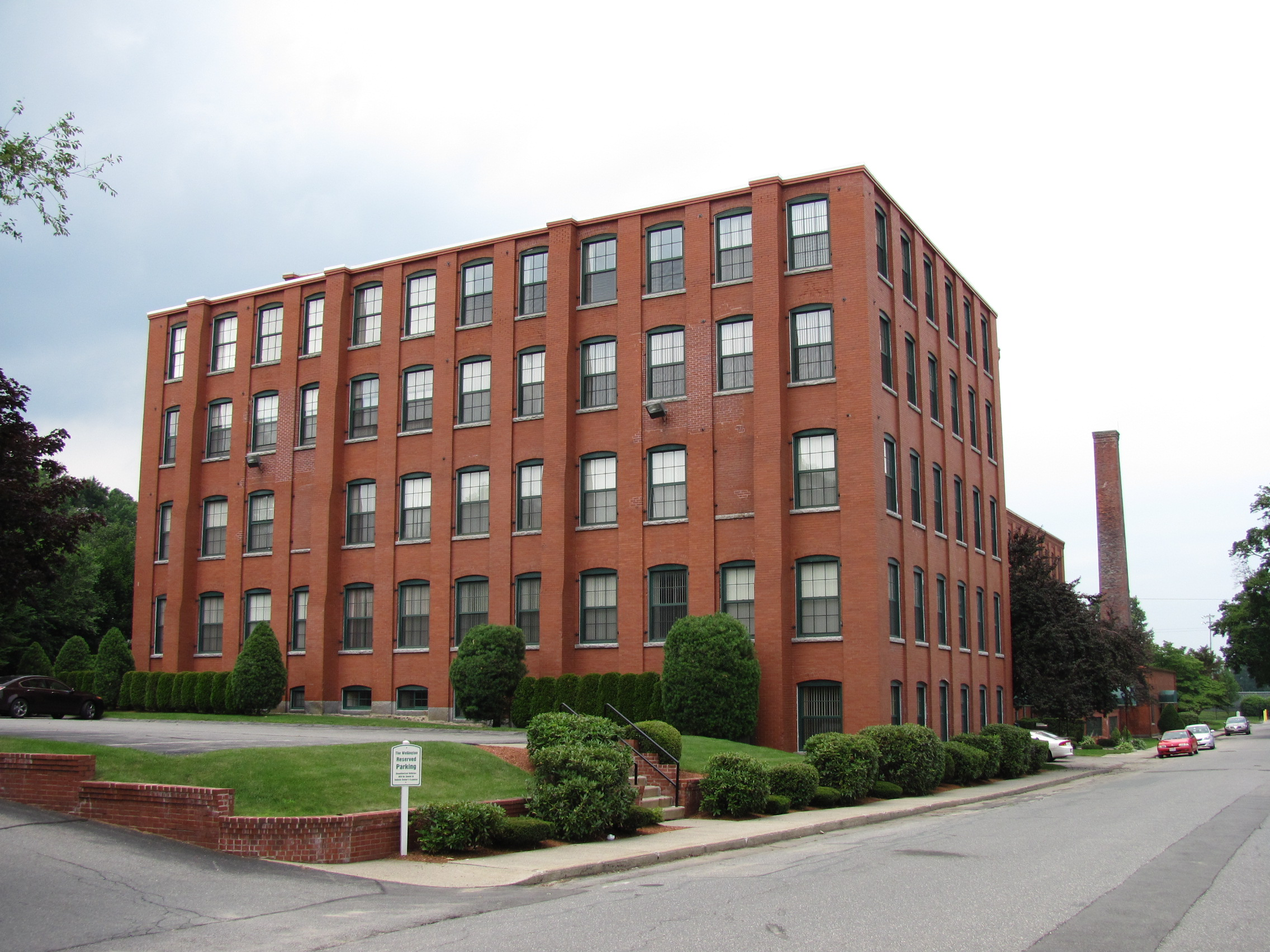
- Wellington Piano Case Company Building

- Location within Massachusetts Location within the United States
- Location: Leominster, Massachusetts
- Coordinates: 42°32′6″N 71°45′21″W
- Built: 1895
- NRHP reference No.: 84002922
- Added to NRHP: May 31, 1984

The Wellington Piano Case Company Building is an historic building at 54 Green Street in Leominster, Massachusetts. The four-story brick building was built in 1895 by Frank E. Wellington, who manufactured piano cases for upright and grand pianos. The building was listed on the National Register of Historic Places in 1984. It was converted to condominium residences in 2002.

== Description and history ==
The former Wellington Piano Case Company Building is located on the west side of Green Street, a short way north of the junction of Massachusetts Routes 12 and 13, north of downtown Leominster. The building consists of three large sections, all of brick construction. The original central block is a four-story structure, finished in pressed red brick with granite sills, and a corbelled cornice. Windows are set in segmented-arch openings, and a six-story square tower with crenellated top projects near its center. To the left (south) it is connected to what is now a five-story structure with similar styling, and to the right is an attached two-story section.

The Wellington Piano Case Company was founded in 1895 by Frank E. Wellington, who had risen through the ranks of other piano case manufacturers in Leominster. The main block, built in 1895, was lauded into the 1930s as one of the city's finest and most modern factory facilities. The southern addition was made in 1906, and was originally six stories in height; the top floor was damaged in the New England Hurricane of 1938 and removed. The northern addition, originally used as a dry kiln, was made in 1919. Wellington's company was the last piano case maker to be established in the city. His company was later acquired by the Cable Piano Company. The building, after standing vacant for some years, was converted into condominium residences in 2002.

== See also ==
- National Register of Historic Places listings in Worcester County, Massachusetts
