= America Sejung Corporation =

Distributor of pianos and guitars

America Sejung Corporation (often given as America Sejung Corp.) was a distributor of pianos and guitars that operated from 2002 to 2013. It was a United States subsidiary of Sejung, a South Korean corporation with a factory in Qingdao, China. Headquartered in Ontario, California, America Sejung imported and sold acoustic pianos (upright, console, and grand) under the brand names of Hobart M. Cable, George Steck, and Falcone; digital pianos under the brand of Sejung; and guitars under the brands of S101 and Canvas.

Its parent company, Sejung, was founded in 1974. (By 2011, the privately owned company would have textile, construction, and information technology businesses with estimated revenues of $1 billion.) In 2001, Sejung Chairman Soon Ho Park decided to spend $20 million to build a 700,000-square-foot piano and guitar factory in China, staffed by experienced Korean managers, to make instruments for local and export sales. The factory was called Qingdao Sejung Musical Instruments and later, Sejung Musical Instrument Manufacturing Company.

America Sejung was incorporated in 2002 as a distribution arm in the United States, initially located in Walnut, California. The company secured the Hobart M. Cable trademark that year, and began offering Cable-branded pianos in two studio and two console models. The HC12F was a 44-inch-tall console with French-styled legs in brown oak satin or cherry satin finish. The HC12M had Mediterranean-style legs in the same finishes. Two 47-inch-tall studio models were available in either French or Mediterranean styling.

The company's trademark on Hobart M. Cable expired in 2012.
