= Aeolian Company =

American musical instrument and record company

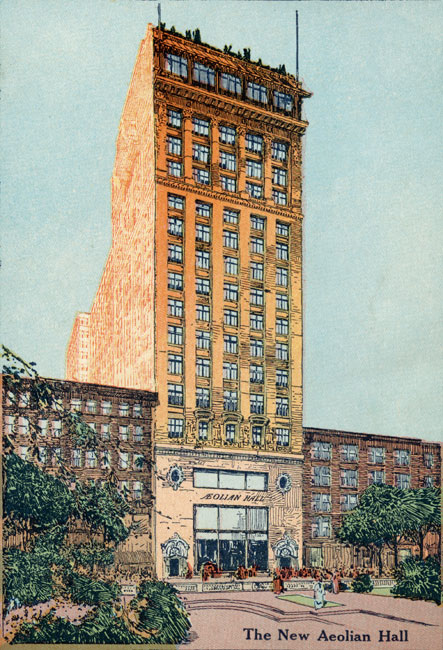
- Aeolian's New York Headquarters from 1912-1927
- Type: Private
- Industry: Organ/Piano Manufacturer
- Predecessor: Mechanical Orguinette Co.
- Founded: 1887; 139 years ago
- Founder: William B. Tremaine
- Defunct: 1985
- Fate: Bankrupted
- Successor: Aeolian-American Piano Corporation
- Headquarters: New York City
- Area served: Worldwide
- Key people: Frederick Gilbert Bourne
- Products: Organs, Pianos, Phonographs
- Subsidiaries: Weber Piano Company; Wm. Knabe & Co.; Steck; Vocalion; Chickering & Sons

The Aeolian Company was a musical-instrument making firm whose products included player organs, pianos, sheet music, records, and phonographs. Founded in 1887, it was at one point the world's largest such firm. At its early-1920s peak, Aeolian produced roughly one-third of U.S. pianos and, following a merger with the American Piano Company, surpassed Kimball to become the world's largest piano manufacturer, with a significant international presence. It held contracts with Steinway & Sons to provide its Duo-Art system for installation in Steinway pianos. The company went out of business in 1985.

== History ==
The Aeolian Company was founded by New York City piano maker William B. Tremaine as the Aeolian Organ & Music Co. in 1887 to make automatic organs, and it was reorganized after 1895 as the Aeolian Co. to manufacture automatic pianos as well. The factory was initially located in Meriden, Connecticut. Tremaine had previously founded the Mechanical Orguinette Co. in 1878 to manufacture automated reed organs. The manufacture of residence or "chamber" organs to provide entertainment in the mansions of millionaires was an extremely profitable undertaking, and Aeolian virtually cornered the market in this trade, freeing it from the tight competition and narrow profit margins of church-organ building. Elaborate cases and consoles were often featured in residence organs. In other installations, the pipes were hidden behind tapestries, under or above staircases, or spoke from the basement through grilles or tone chutes. The company also made organettes and player pump organs for the working man to buy.

The pianola, a pneumatic player piano, soon after became extremely popular. It had been invented in 1895 by Edwin S. Votey, president of the Farrand & Votey Organ Company in Detroit. In 1897, Votey joined Aeolian, and in 1900 the firm obtained the patent for such instruments.

In 1899, Aeolian took over the property and business of the Vocalian Company of Worcester, Massachusetts and ran it together with the Meriden plant.

In 1903, Tremaine absorbed a number of companies making self-playing instruments, including the [Albert] Weber Co., a New York piano maker since 1852, into the Aeolian, Weber Piano & Pianola Co.

In 1904, Aeolian sued the Los Angeles Art Organ Company for patent infringement of its player mechanism, leading to court victories that, with other factors, effectively shut down a competitor. Other patent lawsuits were not always successful.

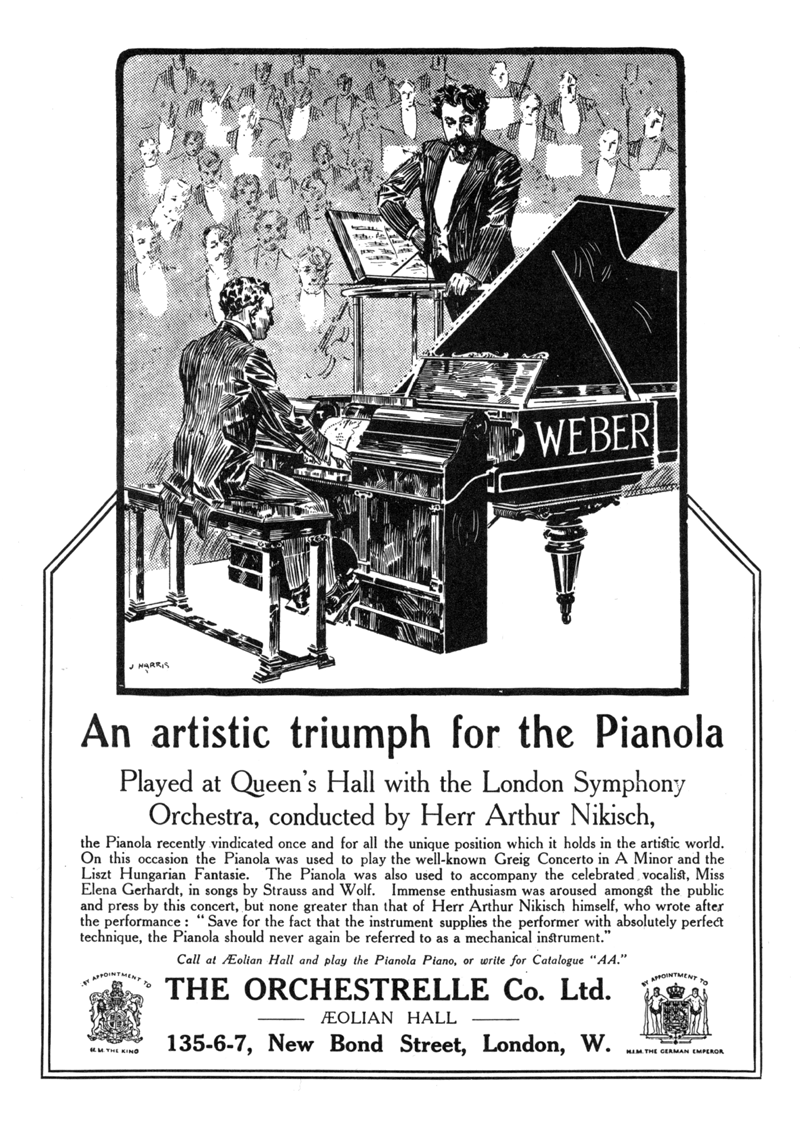
An advertisement for the Aeolian Pianola.(1912)

As the pianola, in its turn, was supplanted by the newer Aeolian "Duo Art" reproducing piano (1913), which could reproduce the sound of a famous artist playing without manual intervention, the Aeolian, Weber Piano & Pianola Co. became the world's leading manufacturer of such roll-operated instruments.

In 1915 the Aeolian Co. started making Vocalion phonographs and in 1917/8 started Vocalion Records, a maker of high-quality discs which in December 1924 was sold to Brunswick Records. The phonograph was one of the main factors in the demise of the player piano, although Starr made players and records as well as pianos. An attempt by the company to engage in the production of church and concert organs resulted in important installations at Duke University Chapel and Longwood Gardens. It was undermined by the Great Depression, during which the organ division was merged with the E.M. Skinner Organ Co. to become the Aeolian-Skinner Organ Co., a leading builder until the 1970s.

On January 27, 1917, R. J. Reynolds placed an order with the Aeolian Company for a pipe organ with four keyboards and a pedal footboard. Today, the organ has about 250 organ rolls and is played in the afternoon for visitors.

As the popularity of the player piano faded with the rise of the phonograph and radio, the company merged in 1932 with the American Piano Company (itself a 1908 consolidation of Chickering & Sons, Knabe & Co., and other manufacturers). The combined company, known as the Aeolian-American Corporation, went through several ownership changes.

In 1959, ownership passed to the Heller family, owners of the former Winter and Co., and it was renamed simply the Aeolian Corporation. William G. Heller, who had worked for Aeolian and its predecessor companies since 1904, served as company president from 1924 until his death in 1974.

In 1974, Aeolian sold pianos under the brand names of Mason & Hamlin, Chickering, Knabe, Hardman & Peck, Winter, Cable, and Ivers & Pond.

In 1983, two years before declaring bankruptcy, it was sold to former Steinway president Peter Perez.

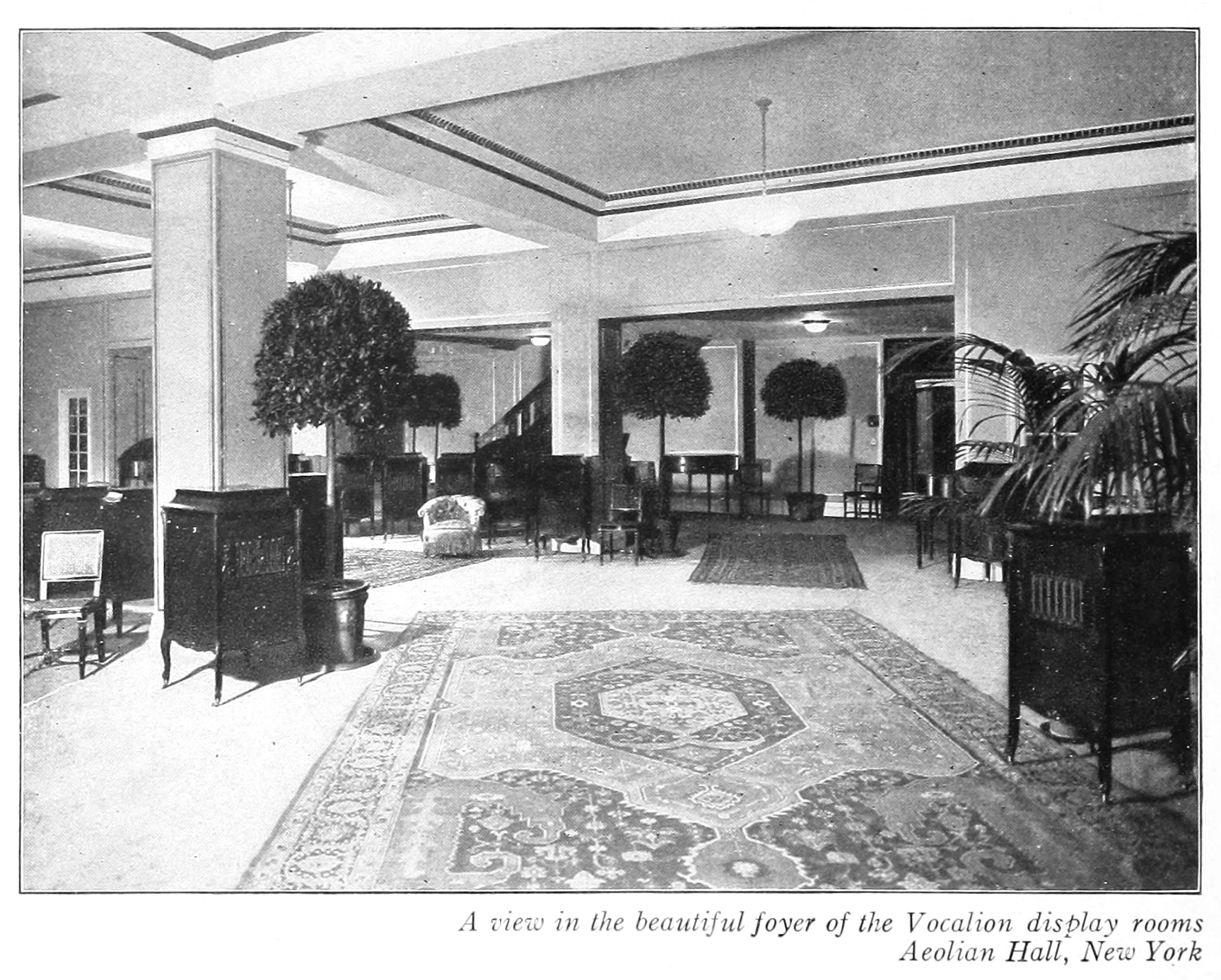
Vocalion showroom, Aeolian Hall 1916

== Locations ==
=== New York ===
Aeolian was first located at 841 Broadway, in the heart (and soul) of the piano district; the company later moved to 23rd Street, and then to 360 Fifth Avenue. Aeolian Hall (1912–13), 33 West 42nd Street, housed the firm's general offices and demonstration rooms as a recital hall on the 43rd Street side, where many noted musicians performed, and was where the first Vocalions were made. The building was sold by Aeolian in 1924. The firm's pipe-organ factory was in Garwood, N.J., until the merger with the E.M. Skinner Co.

The firm returned to Fifth Avenue in 1925, this time moving to 689 Fifth Avenue. The firm's facilities in the new Aeolian Building included a 150-seat recital hall, recording studios for Duo Art piano rolls, offices, design studios, drafting rooms, and a director's room in the upper stories. The Aeolian Company (as Aeolian American Corp.) remained in the Aeolian Building until 1938, after which it leased half of Chickering Hall on West 57th Street.

=== London ===
The company took over the historic Grosvenor Gallery in London, England, in 1903, and created a concert venue known as the Aeolian Hall. The BBC took over the building during World War II.

=== Sydney ===
The Aeolian Company occupied offices in Sydney, Australia, taking over the Pianola Co. Ltd, during the 1920s and 1930s. Recitals and concerts were held in a venue called the Aeolian Hall in George Street.

== Copyright law ==
It was Congressional suspicion of the market power of the Aeolian Company during the early 20th century that prompted adoption of the first compulsory license system in U.S. copyright law, for the mechanical reproduction of musical compositions, a category that included piano rolls.

The player piano deeply troubled popular music composers such as John Philip Sousa. Sousa worried that the pianos would kill the public's demand for sheet music, and sheet music was the source of composers’ copyright royalties. To make matters worse, the player piano companies refused to pay royalties to composers for the songs they put on player piano rolls. These rolls were scrolls of paper with holes punched out in patterns that instructed the piano how to play a particular song. The rolls, argued the player piano companies, did not “copy” the composers’ musical compositions. As a result, they were perfectly legal.

The Supreme Court, in its 1908 opinion in White-Smith Music Publishing Company v. Apollo Company, sided with the player piano companies. The Court held that because humans could not read player piano rolls, they were not in fact copies of the musical compositions they encoded.

The result in White-Smith stood for a year before Congressional action. The Copyright Act of 1909 mandated that all musical compositions would be subject to a compulsory license. Since 1909, the copyright law has allowed musicians to copy others’ songs by mechanical means (e.g., via piano roll or phonorecord) without asking permission, so long as they paid a specified fee to the original songwriter.

Anticipating that Congress was about to overturn White-Smith, Aeolian Company moved swiftly to buy up song rights from musicians and publishing companies so it could copy them onto player piano rolls. Aeolian's competitors quickly complained to Congress about Aeolian's attempt to corner the music market. Congress responded with the invention of the cover song rule.

== Surviving instruments ==
1. Several Aeolian Company products may be seen and some heard on tours at the Musical Museum, Brentford, London, England.
