= Steck (piano) =

George Steck & Company
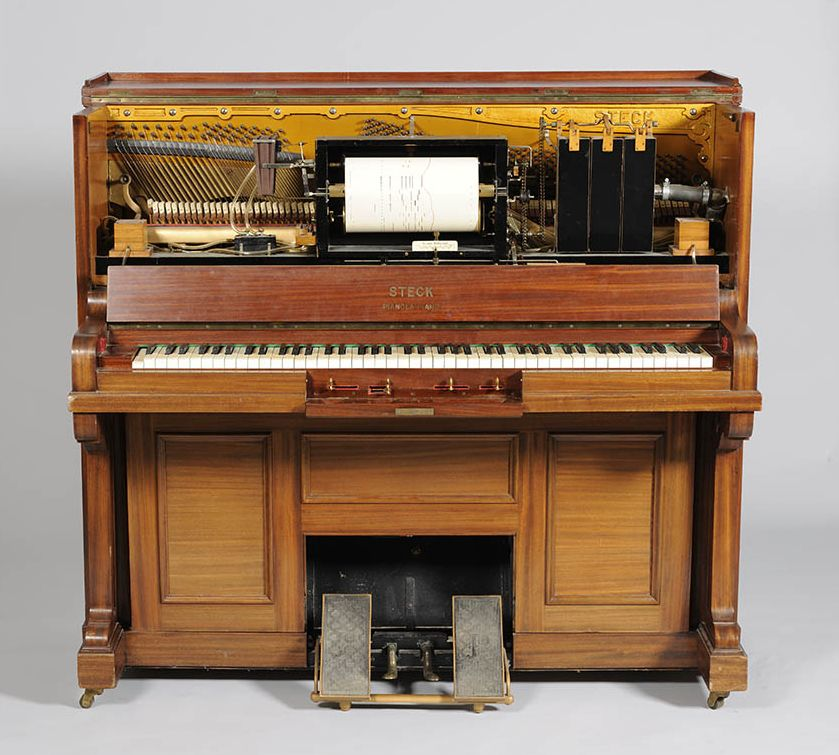
- Steck Pianola piano
- Formerly: Steck & Grupe
- Industry: Piano manufacturing
- Founded: 1857
- Founder: George Steck
- Defunct: 1904
- Fate: Acquired by Aeolian Company in 1904

Steck was a brand of pianos manufactured from 1857 to 1985. They were initially made by George Steck & Company before combining with the Aeolian Company in 1904. The Aeolian Company went bankrupt in 1985. The Steck piano brand was then sold to Sohmer & Co., and then to America Sejung Corporation, which dissolved in 2013.

George Steck & Company had a performance hall known as Steck Hall, which was also the site of several notable speeches.

== History ==
George Steck (July 13, 1829 or July 19, 1829 – March 31, 1897) was born in Hesse-Kassel, Germany. He grew up and studied pianomaking with Carl Scheel in Cassel, Germany. He moved to New York in 1853 and opened a piano factory four years later as the firm Steck & Grupe. The company was known as George Steck & Company by 1860. Another source lists him founding a new company in 1865, also known as Steck & Company. The first factory was located on Twelfth Street and Third Avenue. In 1859 the company moved to Walker Street and later to west 34th Street. Steck found success manufacturing pianos, and his models became standard school pianos across the United States. In 1870 he developed an iron frame for various pianos. The company's pianos were highly awarded at the 1873 Vienna World's Fair and 1876 Centennial Exposition in Philadelphia. At Vienna, Steck won the "1st prize of merit for pianoforte". In 1884 he incorporated his company, giving stock to his employees. Steck retired from the company in 1887, and spent the remainder of his life attempting to design a piano that was always in tune. Factories were also run in Gotha, Germany. Richard Wagner reportedly composed the opera Parsifal on a Steck piano. Steck died in 1897.

George Steck & Company combined with the Aeolian Company in 1904. The corporation continued to make Steck pianos. In the 20th century Steck pianos were a trade name of the Aeolian Company. By 1975 the pianos were manufactured in East Rochester, New York. The Aeolian Company went out of business in 1985. The Steck piano brand was then sold to Sohmer & Co. and then to America Sejung Corporation, which dissolved in 2013.

== Steck Hall ==
Steck Hall

General information
- Location: New York City, US
- Opened: 1871

Steck Hall was opened in 1865 on Clinton Place by Steck as a wareroom where musicians could perform on his piano. He moved into a larger building on East 14th Street, also known as Steck Hall, in 1871. Walt Whitman delivered his first lecture on Abraham Lincoln in the hall on April 14, 1879. José Martí spoke at the hall on January 24, 1880, his first speech in the United States.

== See also ==
- Pianola

== Bibliography ==
- Dolge, Alfred (1911). Pianos and Their Makers: A Comprehensive History of the Development of the Piano from the Monochord to the Concert Grand Player Piano. Covina publishing Company. ISBN 978-0-486-22856-3.
- Spillane, Daniel (1890). History of the American Pianoforte: Its Technical Development, and the Trade. D. Spillane.
- Thompson, Oscar; Bohle, Bruce (1975). The international cyclopedia of music and musicians. Internet Archive. New York : Dodd, Mead. ISBN 978-0-396-07005-4.
- Who was who in american history, arts and letters. Chicago : Marquis Who's Who. 1975. ISBN 978-0-8379-3301-6.
- The men who advertise : an account of successful advertisers, together with hints on the method of advertising. George P. Rowell & Co. 1870.
