= Winter and Company =

- Formerly: Heller & Co.
- Type: Private company
- Industry: Musical-instrument manufacturer
- Founded: 1901
- Founder: Gottlieb Heller
- Defunct: 1960
- Fate: Acquired
- Successor: Aeolian Company
- Headquarters: The Bronx, New York City, United States
- Key people: Julius Winter, William G. Heller
- Products: Pianos

Winter and Company was an American manufacturer of pianos. It was founded in 1901 and in 1960 was merged with Aeolian-American pianomaking firm to become the Aeolian Company.

== History ==
The company was founded in 1901 as Heller & Co. by cabinetmaker Gottlieb Heller (b. 1868 in Stuttgart), the firm was purchased and renamed in June 1901 by Julius Winter (b. 1856 in Hungary).

In 1903, the company opened a factory on Southern Boulevard in The Bronx borough of New York City. In 1904, the company began to sell player pianos that used a "Master Player" mechanism of its own design.

Founded in the last decades of the Golden Age of the Piano, when the instrument had no competition from radio, recorded music, and the automobile, Winter & Co. outlived the vast majority of its contemporary pianomakers, and acquired several of them that fell on hard times. Among these were Chicago-based The Cable Company in 1943, once the country's largest maker of reed organs; the Ivers and Pond Piano Company of Cambridge, Massachusetts, in 1945; Kranich and Bach in 1946; and Hardman Peck in 1953. Mason & Risch of Ontario, Canada, was another.

Its longtime president was William G. Heller, a son of Gottlieb.

In 1951, the company opened a factory in Memphis, Tennessee.

In the 1960s, Winter & Co. was merged with Aeolian-American pianomaking firm, becoming the Aeolian Company.
