= Hardman Peck =

American piano manufacturer

Hardman Peck was a piano manufacturer established in New York City in 1842 by Hugh Hardman. Hugh's brother John joined the company in 1874, and Leopold Peck became a partner in 1890. In 1890 the name was changed to Hardman, Peck & Co. Hardman was considered one of the distinguished piano manufacturers of this era, with a worldwide reputation for the utmost in reliability. Hardman pianos were noted for their technical qualities, for their purity, delicacy, the artistic beauty of their cases, and for their remarkable durability. Hardman pianos were once the official piano of the Metropolitan Opera Company in New York.

== Hardman, Peck & Company ==
The Hardman name is one of the more illustrious names in American piano manufacturing. Hugh Hardman is first listed in New York's piano industry as early as 1842, the date that Hardman, Peck & Company claims as their date of establishment. Hardman headed his own firm building pianos under his own name until 1877, when he went into partnership with his son, John Hardman, establishing the firm of 'Hardman & Company'. Hugh Hardman retired in 1879, leaving the firm to his son John, who continued to operate with great success.

In 1880, John Hardman went into partnership with Leopold Peck and a piano dealer by the name of Dowling, changing the firm of Hardman & Company to 'Hardman, Dowling & Peck'. During this partnership, the firm was granted several patents for improved piano building, and their instruments were known to be of superb quality and design. In 1884 Dowling withdrew from the firm, and the firm was reorganized as the famous 'Hardman, Peck & Company', and was incorporated under that name in 1905.

Known simply as 'Hardman-Peck', the firm built a variety of upright, grand and player pianos in the early 20th century. They were known for building superior quality instruments. They manufactured several other brand names, including The Autotone Player Piano, Playotone, Hardman-Duo Player Piano, Standard, Minipiano, and Harrington. Sometime in the Great Depression era, industrial giant Aeolian took over Hardman, Peck & Company, and continued to build pianos under that name until the 1980s.

In the 1990s the company and trademark was purchased by North American Music. North American introduced a full line of Hardman Peck upright and grand pianos made by Beiijing HsingHai Musical Instruments Corporation, one of the world's largest piano manufacturers. Beiijing Musical Instruments Corporation at around the same time entered into a long term joint venture manufacturing agreement with Kawai Piano Japan corporation in 1995 to build Kawai brand pianos to be sold in Asia. Kawai's technical input boosted the quality of the Beiijing made product up to a level good enough to wear the Kawai name. Many of the current Hardman models are based on Kawai designs. Eventually all of the Hardman piano models not based on Kawai designs had the benefit of the technical input of Kawai Japan technicians. The entire Hardman line today is considered one of the highest-quality/value lines of pianos due in part to the Kawai joint venture. In January 2014 the two companies ended their nearly 20-year collaboration although Beiijing HsingHai is still manufacturing all of the Hardman piano models the two companies collaborated on. Larry Fine, the author of the pianobuyer.com, recently elevated the entire Hardman line up one level in the bi-annual guide's ratings, singling out the Model 45F as a staff pick saying it is a "good value and well constructed."
