= Beiijing HsingHai Musical Instruments Corporation =

Chinese musical instrument manufacturer

- Native name: 北京星海乐器有限公司
- Industry: Musical instruments
- Website: www.xhpiano.com

Beiijing HsingHai Musical Instruments Corporation (or Beijing Xinghai Musical Instrument Corporation; Chinese: 北京星海乐器有限公司) is one of the largest musical instrument manufacturers in China. Based in Beijing, the company was established on June 1, 1949.

It produces Western instruments such as pianos and accordions as well as traditional Chinese musical instruments such as yangqin, ruan, and sheng. The company has nearly 4,000 employees and is one of China's largest piano manufacturers.

They make the "Heritage" Collection for the Hallet Davis and Company, Boston (H&D) piano line. The Heritage Collection is the entry-level line for H&D, with the smallest upright pianos, and smallest grand pianos (4'7") for the H&D family. The H&D is the oldest U.S. piano name dating back to 1843 with the same name, and 1835 under the Brown and Hallet name. The H&D piano name pre-dates the second oldest U.S. piano by Weber (1852), and the third oldest by Steinway and Sons (1853).

Its area is 300,000 square meters, and its floor space is about 170,000 square meters. The company has several locations in Beijing and also maintains a conservatory.

== See also ==
- Aigo
