= History of the harpsichord =

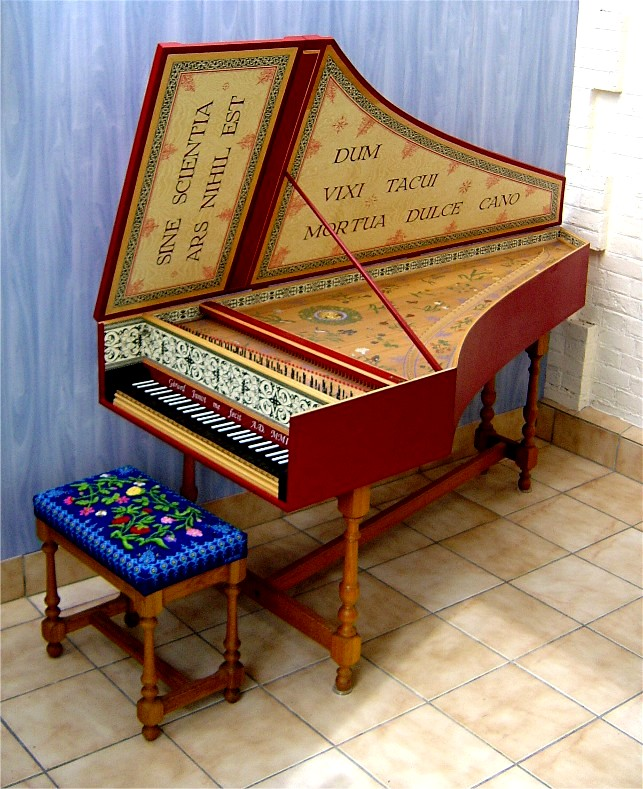
Harpsichord in the Flemish style. The translations of the Latin mottos are "Without skill art is nothing" and "While I lived I was silent—in death I sweetly sing."

The harpsichord was an important keyboard instrument in Europe from the 15th through the 18th centuries, and as revived in the 20th, is widely played today.

== Origins ==
The New Grove musical dictionary summarizes the earliest historical traces of the harpsichord: "The earliest known reference to a harpsichord dates from 1397, when a jurist in Padua wrote that a certain Hermann Poll claimed to have invented an instrument called the 'clavicembalum'; and the earliest known representation of a harpsichord is a sculpture (see below) in an altarpiece of 1425 from Minden in north-west Germany."

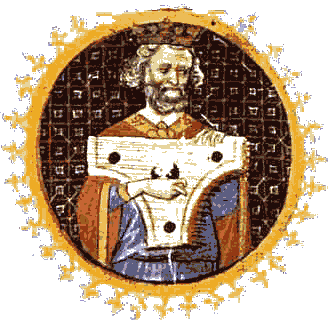
Psaltery of the 14th century from the book De Musica by Boethius

Whoever invented the harpsichord did not have to proceed from scratch. The idea of controlling a musical instrument with a keyboard was already well worked out for the organ, an instrument that is far older than the harpsichord. Moreover, the psaltery was a widely used instrument of the Middle Ages. Like the later harpsichord, it had metal strings which were held at controlled tension with tuning pins and transmitted their vibrations through a bridge to a soundboard, rendering them audible. The insight needed to create the harpsichord was thus to find a way to pluck strings mechanically, in a way controlled by a keyboard. The 14th century was a time in which advances in clockwork and other machinery were being made; hence the time may have been ripe for the invention of the harpsichord.

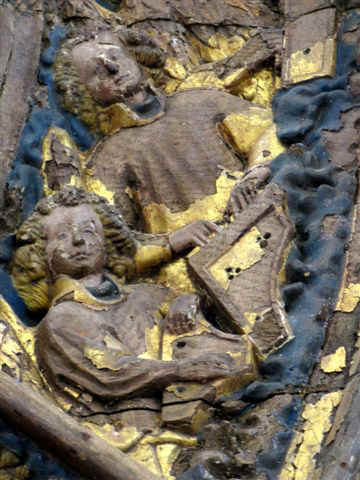
The earliest known image of a harpsichord, from the 1425 altarpiece of the cathedral in Minden, Germany. The harpsichord is reversed in orientation in the original, not in the photograph. A second angel plays a psaltery.

It is possible that the standard harpsichord mechanism, with jacks holding plectra mounted on retractable tongues, may only gradually have won out over alternatives. A Latin manuscript work on musical instruments by Henri Arnault de Zwolle from about 1440 includes detailed diagrams of three types of jack action, as well as a mechanism describable as a crude (and premature) predecessor of the piano action.

Another chain of development in the early harpsichord was a gradually increasing size. The psaltery was a hand-held instrument, far smaller than the fully evolved harpsichord. Early harpsichords were evidently small in both pitch range and string length. This can be seen, for instance, in the work of Sebastian Virdung, his Musica getutscht (Basel 1511). Virdung describes three instruments he calls the Virginal, the Clavicimbalum, and the upright Claviciterium. These had pitch ranges of 38, 40, and 38 keys, respectively, far smaller than later instruments. Frank Hubbard believed that all three must have been ottavini, meaning instruments that sound an octave above normal pitch. Since pitch range is linked to string length, an ottavino is one way of building a small instrument. Ottavini were also common later on in the early history of the harpsichord.

== Italy ==
The earliest complete harpsichords still preserved come from Italy, the oldest specimen being dated to 1521. (The Royal College of Music in London has a clavicytherium, lacking its action, which may be older.) Even the earliest extant Italian instruments represent an already well-refined form of the instrument, showing no traces of their more primitive origin.

The Italian harpsichord makers made single-manual instruments with a very light construction and relatively little string tension. The Italian instruments are considered pleasing but unspectacular in their tone and serve well for accompanying singers or other instruments. Towards the end of the historical period larger and more elaborate Italian instruments were built, notably by Bartolomeo Cristofori (who later invented the piano).

== Flanders ==
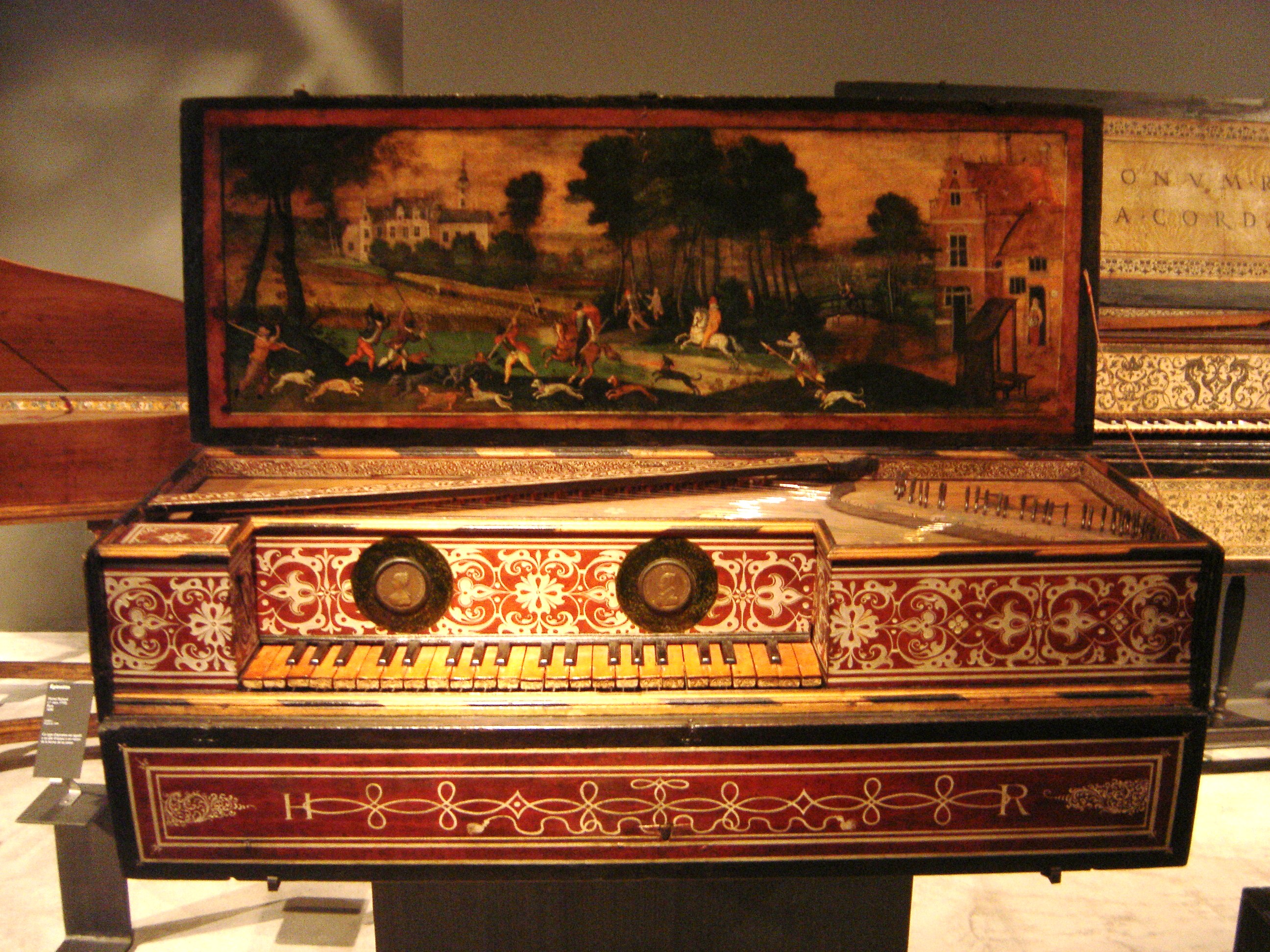
Flemish virginal (Paris, Musée de la Musique)

A major innovation in harpsichord construction took place in Flanders some time around 1580 with the work of Hans Ruckers and his descendants, including Ioannes Couchet. The Ruckers harpsichord was more solidly constructed than the Italian. Because the Ruckers workshop used iron strings for the treble, as a result the scaling (the length of the vibrating part of the string for a given pitch) was longer, (always with the basic two sets of strings; one 8-foot and a 4-foot), with greater string tension, and a heavier case, as well as a very slender and responsive spruce soundboard, the tone was more sustaining than the Italian harpsichords', and was widely emulated by harpsichord builders in most other nations.

The Flemish makers of ca. 1600 were apparently the first to build two-manual harpsichords. They built them merely to permit easy transposition: the keyboards sounded the same strings, but one fourth apart. Thus, the player could effortlessly transpose at this interval (e.g., to accommodate a singer) by playing on the second manual.

The Flemish harpsichords were often elaborately painted and decorated, and bore Latin mottoes.

Fine instruments continued to be made by Flemish builders in the 18th century, generally along French lines, most notably by the Dulcken family. Another notable Flemish builder, Albert Delin, however continued making instruments close to the Ruckers tradition well into the latter half of the 18th century

== France ==
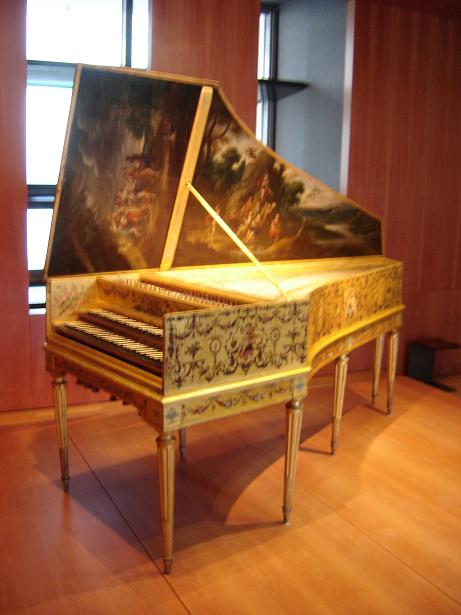
Ruckers-Taskin harpsichord, (Paris, Musée de la Musique)

French builders were responsible for important further development of the Ruckers-type instrument. The first step, taken in the mid-17th century, was to change the purpose of the second manual in two-manual instruments: whereas in the Flemish school this had been for allowing the player to transpose, the French makers used the second keyboard to permit rapid changes (i.e., while playing) between different choirs of strings; in other words, they were "expressive doubles".

The French harpsichord reached its apogee in the 18th century, notably with the work of the Blanchet family and their successor Pascal Taskin. These French instruments were founded on the Flemish design, but extended in range, from the roughly four octaves of the Ruckers instruments to about five octaves. The 18th-century French harpsichord is greatly admired and has been widely adopted as a model for the construction of modern instruments.

A striking aspect of the 18th-century French tradition was its near-obsession with the Ruckers harpsichords. In a process called grand ravalement, many of the surviving Ruckers instruments were reworked and enlarged, with new soundboard material and case construction adding extra notes to their range— or in the case of original Ruckers single-manual instruments, adding a second. A number of builders, Taskin included, constructed (often very fine) new instruments and passed them off as Ruckers restorations. A more basic process was the so-called petit ravalement, in which the keyboards and string sets, but not the case, were modified— often by the addition of additional choirs of strings or narrower keys to increase the range.

== England ==
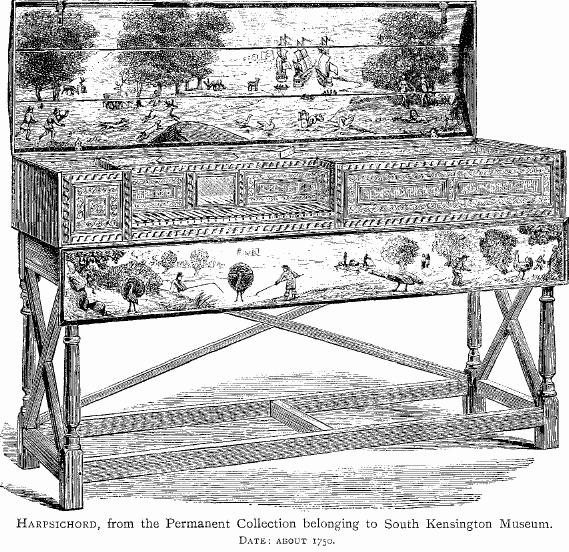
Virginal, probably English, late 17th century

The harpsichord was important in England during the Renaissance for the large group of major composers who wrote for it. Harpsichord building in England only achieved great distinction in the 18th century with the work of two immigrant makers, Jacob Kirckman (from Alsace) and Burkat Shudi (from Switzerland). The harpsichords by these builders have been described by the famous builder-scholar Frank Hubbard as "possibly the culmination of the harpsichord maker's art".

Visually, the instruments are considered very impressive, boasting a great deal of veneering and marquetry. Sheridan Germann writes of them, "English harpsichords must be acknowledged as great furniture, sumptuous in textures of wood and brass and fine joinery, and built to last forever."

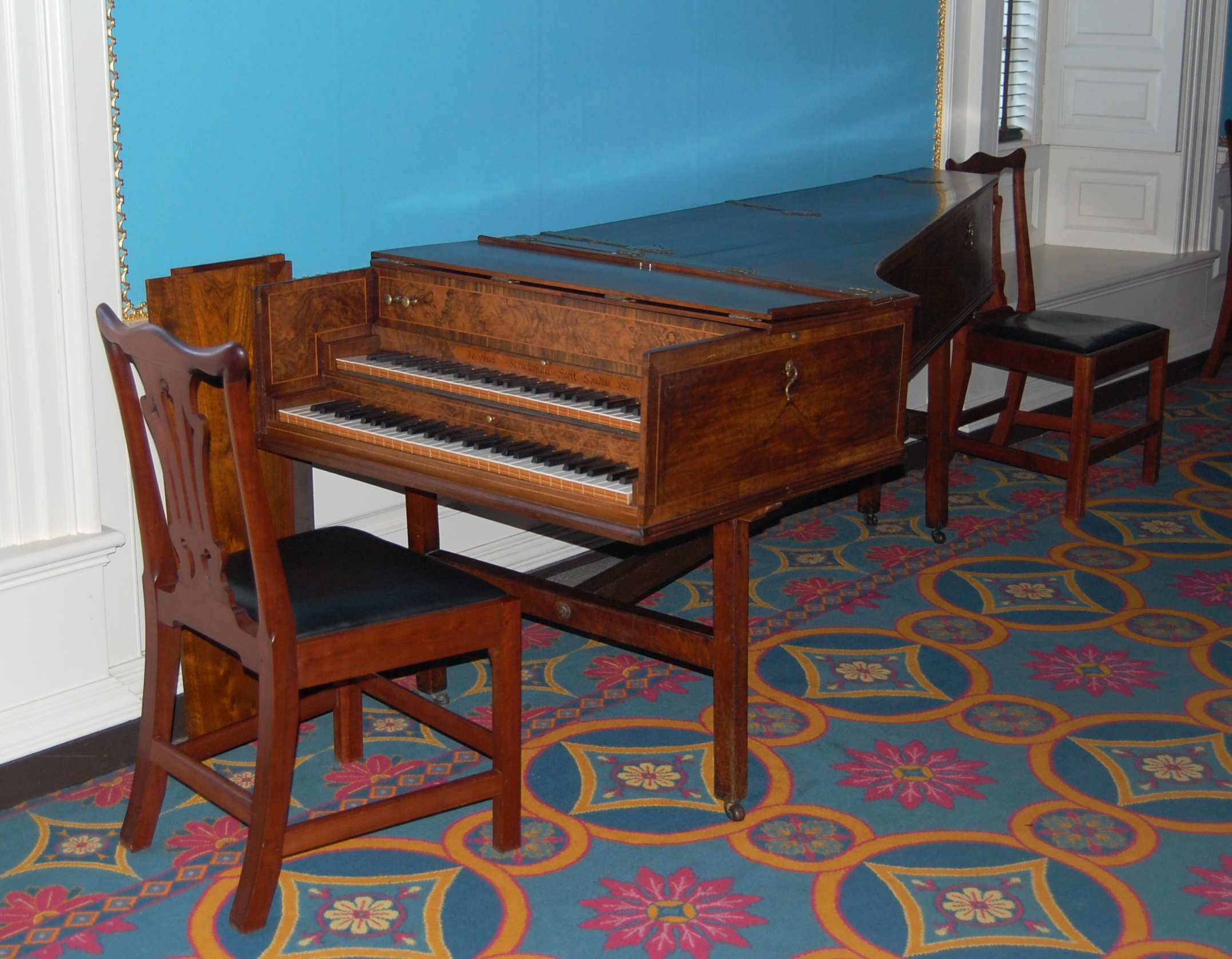
A 1758 harpsichord by Kirkman, now in the Governor's Palace in Williamsburg, Virginia

The sound of the Kirkman and Shudi instruments is described by the authors of Grove Dictionary as "enormously rich and powerful"; "whereas that of a French harpsichord may be compared to the sound of a woodwind ensemble, the tone of these developed English instruments, with their brilliant trebles and imposing basses, may be compared to that of a brass band. The sound thus lacks the subtlety of a French instrument but more than compensates by its volume and sensual impact. ... The sound of these instruments sometimes tends to call attention to itself rather than merely serving as a vehicle for projecting the music, a quality that may in abstract terms be viewed as a defect despite its splendour." A similar opinion was held by Frank Hubbard, who wrote: "For sheer magnificence of tone no other instrument ever matched them ... The only reproach that might be leveled against these instruments is that they are too good. The tone is so luxurious and characteristic that it almost interferes with the music."

Few modern replicas of the Kirkman/Shudi style instrument have ever been built; possibly because of the tonal issue just raised. Germann also notes that the solid construction of the original instruments means that quite of few of them are still in use today, lessening the demand for new ones.

The Shudi firm was passed on to Shudi's son-in-law John Broadwood, who adapted it to the manufacture of pianos and became a leading creative force in the development of that instrument.

== Germany ==
German harpsichord makers roughly followed the French model, but with a special interest in achieving a variety of sonorities, perhaps because some of the most eminent German builders were also builders of pipe organs. Some German harpsichords included a choir of 2-foot strings (that is, strings pitched two octaves above the primary set). A few even included a 16-foot stop, pitched an octave below the main 8-foot choirs. One still-preserved German harpsichord even has three manuals to control the many combinations of strings that were available. This represents the northern school of German harpsichord building as featured by builders such as Hieronymus Hass and Christian Zell. The southern school features instruments inspired by Italian harpsichord building: simple large double manual instruments, often undecorated, using brass strings and an Italian construction of the soundboard. These instruments were built by Michael Mietke, Heinrich Gräbner and the Silbermann family. Many modern builders have copied the Mietke instruments and they have proven to be an alternative to the French type harpsichord.

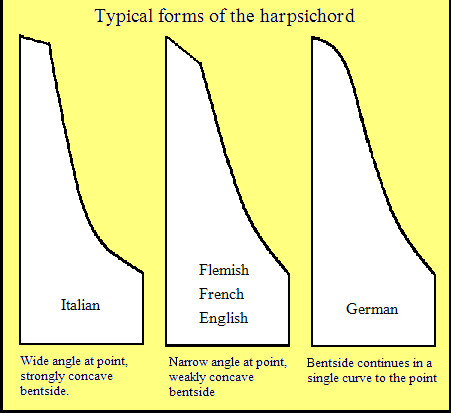

== Obsolescence ==
At the peak of its development, the harpsichord lost favor to the piano. The piano quickly evolved away from its harpsichord-like origins, and the accumulated traditional knowledge of harpsichord builders gradually dissipated. The old harpsichords were not valued, often destroyed (for example, they were used in the Paris Conservatory for firewood), and the instrument was something of a ghost for the duration of the 19th century. One exception is the continued use for recitative music in opera well into the 19th century, it was also used in basso continuo because of its power to "cut through" the orchestra, the fact that it did not completely disappear from the public eye due to sporadic use in popular music (that persisted until around the turn of the century) played a role in revival efforts that began in the mid-19th century. However, by the late 19th century, despite revival efforts, its use even in the recitative style began to disappear and was rarely used in new basso continuo pieces due to increasing orchestra size.

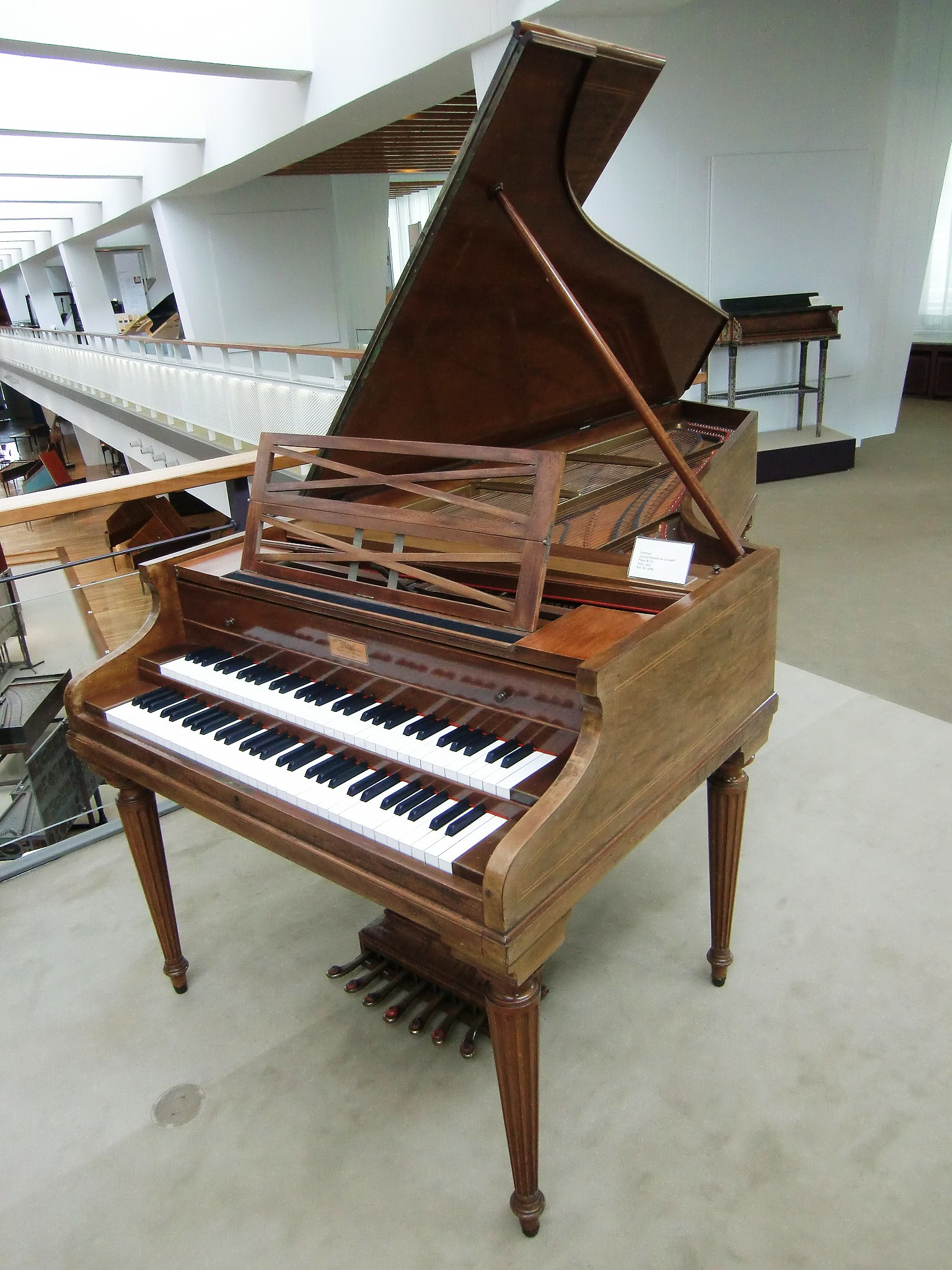
The Pleyel "Grand Modèle de Concert", favored by Wanda Landowska

== Revival ==
=== Early stages ===
Interest reawakened around the dawn of the 20th century, and the harpsichord was gradually revived.

A recurring theme in this revival has been the tension between the goal of authentic reconstruction of earlier instruments through rediscovery of old technology, and the use of modern technology—anachronistic, but often thought helpful in improving the quality of the instrument.

An early authenticist was Arnold Dolmetsch, working early in the century in Surrey in England. Dolmetsch's efforts proved premature, as the first half of the century came to be dominated by modernist efforts. Such instruments, made for instance by the Pleyel et Cie firm of Paris, were heavily influenced by the modern grand piano, notably in using heavy metal frames, far sturdier than would be needed to support the tension of harpsichord strings. These instruments typically included a 16-foot stop to bolster their sound, following a (relatively unusual) practice of 18th-century German builders. Harpsichord scholar Edward Kottick has used the term "revival harpsichords" for this class of instrument, reserving the term "modern harpsichord" for the more historically authentic instruments that developed later.

A notable player of the Pleyel revival harpsichords was Wanda Landowska, whose playing and persona greatly increased the popularity of the harpsichord in her time. A number of important 20th-century composers, such as Francis Poulenc and Manuel de Falla, wrote works for revival harpsichords.

The end of the Second World War brought new demand for harpsichords, and firms manufacturing the revival harpsichord prospered, notably Neupert, Wittmayer, and Sperrhake. The revival harpsichord continued to evolve, even into the period at which it was being abandoned. Pleyel stopped production after Landowska's death in 1959. Kottick and Luckenberg describe a 1970 Wittmeyer instrument, kept today in a Berlin museum, that incorporated amplification: "In an effort to give this huge but relatively quiet instrument some of the resonance the antiques had, it was equipped with an amplifier, and two speakers were built into the soundboard."

=== The harpsichord revival II: the authenticist movement ===
Starting around the middle of the century, the authenticist approach was given new impetus by the work of the builders Frank Hubbard and William Dowd, working in Boston, and Martin Skowroneck, working in Bremen, Germany. These builders based their construction on painstaking research: they took apart and inspected many old instruments and consulted the available written material on harpsichords from the historical period. These mid-century authenticist instruments proved very popular, and many other builders soon followed the example of Hubbard and his colleagues.

As the authenticist movement developed, it grew ever more devoted to historical rather than revival-style technology. Plexiglas or metal upper and lower guides were abandoned for the historical wooden guides, heavy jack end pins were abandoned, piano-style keyboards were replaced by the lighter historical type, and steel piano-wire strings were replaced by iron or brass. The authenticist instruments have largely vanquished the heavy revival instruments of the earlier 20th century.

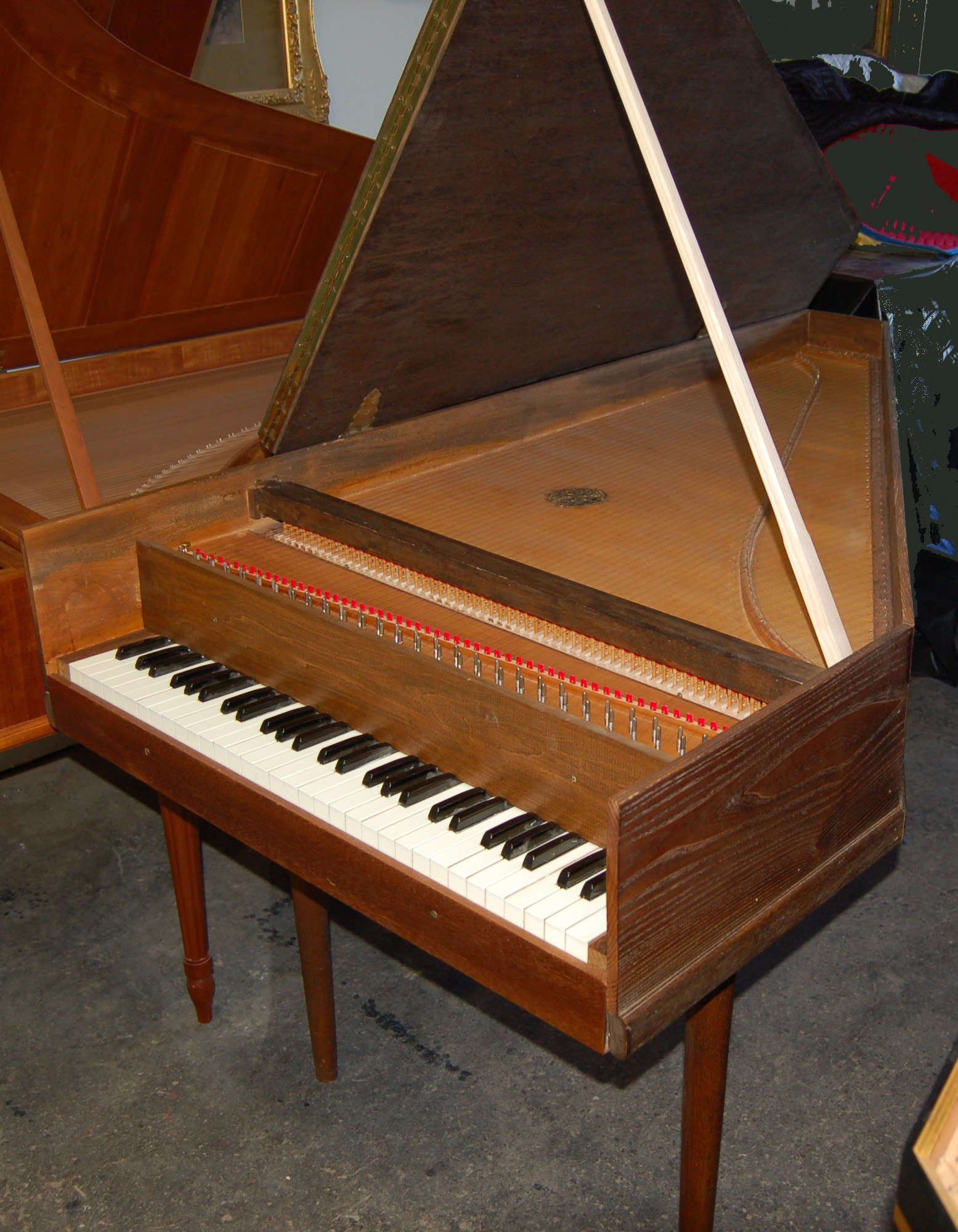
A kit-built Zuckermann "Z-box" harpsichord

Since the late 1950s, harpsichords have often been constructed by amateurs from kits, a system pioneered by the American builder Wolfgang Zuckermann. The early Zuckermann kits were pragmatically rather than authentically designed, using plywood and straight "bentsides". They were an important force in increasing the popularity of the harpsichord. More recent kits have followed historical lines.

== See also ==
- List of historical harpsichord makers
- Folding harpsichord
- Virginals
- Spinet
- Leopoldo Franciolini, a noted fraudster whose altered instruments are to this day a barrier to the study of the history of the harpsichord
