= William Dowd =

American harpsichord maker

William Dowd playing a 1987 Dowd Harpsichord

William Richmond Dowd (28 February 1922 – 25 November 2008) was an American harpsichord maker, one of the most important pioneers of the historical harpsichord movement.

== Life and career ==
Born in Newark, New Jersey, he studied English literature at Harvard, graduating with AB in 1948. He and his friend Frank Hubbard built a clavichord when they were both graduate students; this led to their both deciding to abandon their intended careers as teachers of English and instead to become harpsichord builders, basing their methods on historical principles. They separated for their apprenticeship; Dowd worked at the Detroit workshop of John Challis, who himself had learned from Arnold Dolmetsch. At this time, Challis was the leading harpsichord builder in the United States.

In autumn 1949 Dowd and Hubbard jointly founded a workshop in Boston, Massachusetts. In 1955, Hubbard had left on research trips around Europe, studying original instruments, while Dowd continued the new builds and restoration of antique instruments. He worked out a standard design based on the harpsichords of Pascal Taskin, which was to become much used by professional performers.

Their joint business came to an end in 1958, and Dowd established a workshop in Cambridge, Massachusetts along historical lines, producing around twenty instruments a year until 1988. From 1971 to 1985, there was a workshop in Paris under his name producing a similar number of instruments, which he ran with Reinhard von Nagel. His favoured models were two-manual harpsichords based on the French instruments of Blanchet and Taskin, including Ruckers harpsichords adapted by the grand ravalement process.

Dowd's instruments have long provided the benchmark for reliability in terms of tuning and general stability, cleanliness of construction, and for the influence that they have had on succeeding generations of builders. He was the first builder to seriously consider the eighteenth-century German instruments of Michael Mietke (in contrast to his colleague Hubbard). His instruments were used in performance and recording by such artists as Gustav Leonhardt, Isolde Ahlgrimm, Ralph Kirkpatrick, Igor Kipnis, Bob van Asperen, and many others.

He died in Reston, Virginia, in November 2008.

== Published works ==
- A Classification System for Ruckers and Couchet Double Harpsichords; in the Journal of the American Musical Instrument Society (1978)
- The Surviving Instruments of the Blanchet Workshop; in The Historical Harpsichord: a Monograph Series in Honor of Frank Hubbard, ed. Howard Schott (Stuyvesant, NY, 1984)
- Haney, H: Portrait of a Builder, The Harpsichord, (1971–2) (about William Dowd)

== See also ==
- List of historical harpsichord makers

== Notes and references ==
- Howard Schott: 'Dowd, William (Richmond)', Grove Music Online ed. L. Macy (Accessed 2007-05-18), http://www.grovemusic.com/
