= Blanchet (harpsichord makers) =

Family of French harpsichord makers

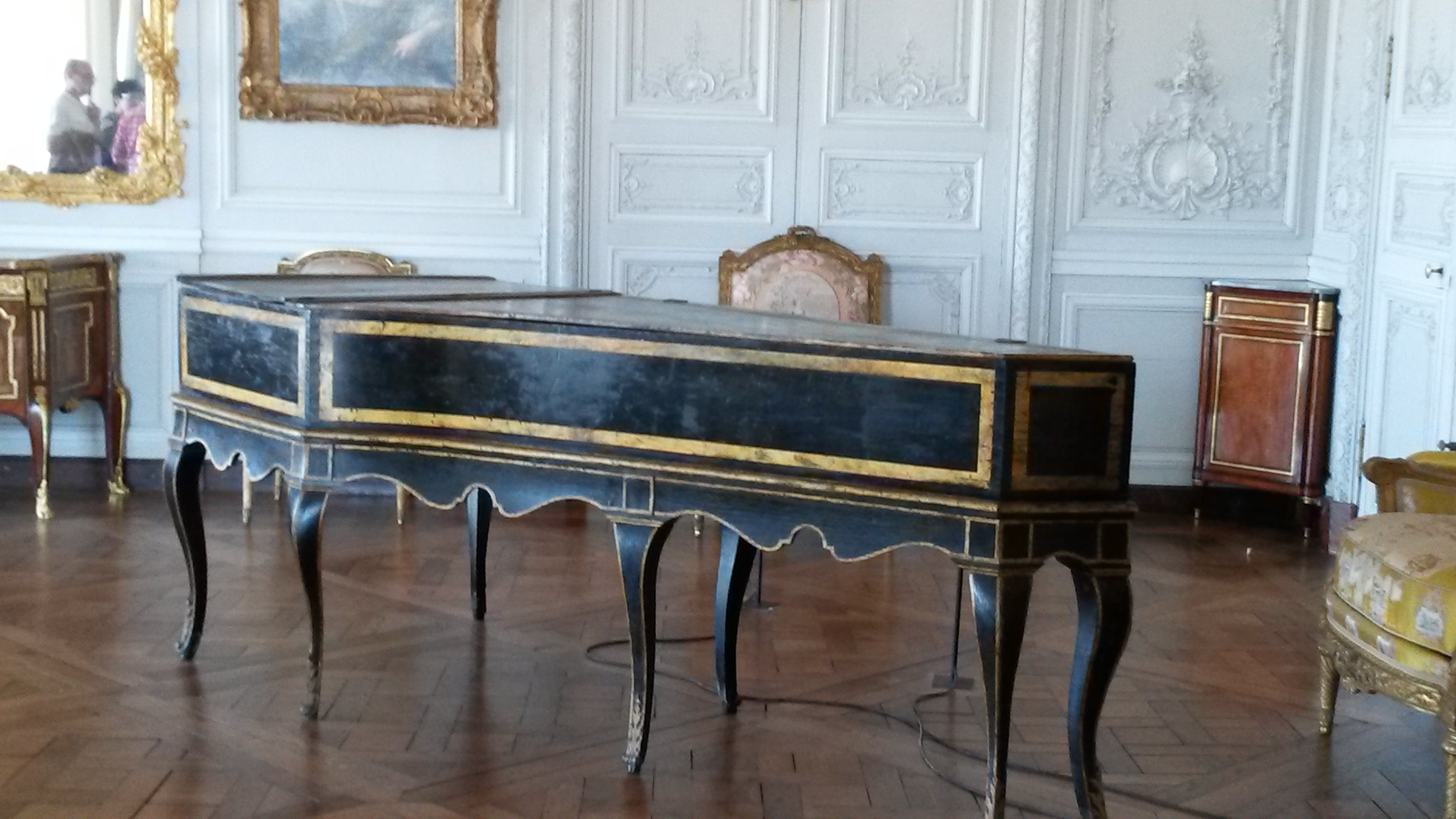

The Blanchet family were an extended family of French harpsichord-makers from the late-17th century to the mid-19th century, by which time they had become piano makers.

== Family members ==
Nicolas Blanchet I (c.1660 - 1731) was born in Reims and by 1686 was living in Paris, where he spent the rest of his life. He became a master instrument-maker in 1689. There was an earlier instrument maker of the same name who worked in Paris in the early 17th century, but it is not known whether the two were related.

François-Étienne Blanchet I (c.1695 - 1761) was the second son of Nicolas Blanchet I and followed him in his craft, becoming a full partner in 1722. He lived his life in Paris, as did all his descendants. He married Elisabeth Gobin in 1727 and they had two children. François Couperin owned a large harpsichord by Blanchet; instruments made by the Blanchet family were of a high quality, much in demand and sold for high prices. Like the Goermans family, the Blanchet family made many ravalements (that is, enlargements in range and other modern adaptations) of 17th-century Flemish instruments, especially those of the Ruckers family. Ruckers harpsichords were highly prized in France at that time to such an extent that in some 'Ruckers' instruments only the soundboard was original, or nothing at all.

Elisabeth-Antoinette Blanchet (1729 - 1815) was François-Étienne Blanchet I's daughter and married Armand-Louis Couperin in 1752.

François-Étienne Blanchet II (c.1730 - 1766) was François-Étienne Blanchet I's son and like him became a harpsichord maker, learning from his father. Pascal Taskin became his apprentice and took over his workshop after his early death. The Blanchet family became associated with the French court in the 1740s and became facteur des clavessins du Roi (makers of the King's harpsichords) in the 1750s . They continued making harpsichords as late as the 1790s, while at the same time making fortepianos (Claude-Bénigne Balbastre owned one made in 1763).

Armand-François-Nicolas Blanchet (1763 - 1818) was the son of François-Étienne Blanchet II and brought up and trained by Pascal Taskin after his father's early death. He left an instructional textbook entitled Méthode abrégée pour accorder le clavecin et le piano (Paris, 1797–1800).

Nicolas Blanchet II was Armand-François-Nicolas Blanchet's son and took over the family business in 1818. Johannes Roller, a German piano maker, became a partner in the firm until his retirement in 1851. Their first upright piano was made in 1827, and they led the production of high-quality uprights after designing an improved model in 1830. Nicolas's son P. A. C. Blanchet succeeded to the family business in 1855.

== See also ==
- List of historical harpsichord makers

== Sources ==
- William Dowd: The Surviving Instruments of the Blanchet Workshop; The Historical Harpsichord: a Monograph Series in Honor of Frank Hubbard i, ed. Howard Schott (Stuyvesant, NY, 1984)
- William Dowd/John Koster: 'Blanchet', Grove Music Online ed. L. Macy (Accessed 2007-05-20), http://www.grovemusic.com/
