= Angela van den Brant =

17th-century business owner

- Citizenship: Belgium
- Known for: 17th-century business owner and harpsichord maker

Angela van den Brant was a 17th-century business owner, harpsichord maker and member of the Antwerp based Couchet Family. She was married to Joannes Couchet who was a descendent of the renowned Ruckers Family.

Following her husband's death she worked alongside Flemish harpsichord maker Simon Hagaerts to maintain the workshop, providing access to her late husband's resources in exchange for the training of her son, Petrus Joannes Couchet. Their contract stipulated that Hagaerts was not permitted to take on any other trainees and would receive payment for his tuition. The arrangement between Van den Brant and Hagaerts allowed the Couchet Family to receive an equal portion of the workshop's profits however the status of their contract from 1661 onwards is unclear. Three of her seven children entered as harpsichord makers into the Guild of St Luke, suggesting that training may have continued beyond 1661. She died sometime around the year 1667, survived by six of her and Couchet's children.
