= John Germain =

John Germain may refer to:

- Sir John Germain, 1st Baronet
- Jean Germain (disambiguation)

== See also ==
- Germain (surname)
