= John Challis (harpsichord) =

American builder of harpsichords and clavichords

John Challis (1907–1974) was an American builder of harpsichords and clavichords, at one time the only such maker of harpsichords in the United States.

His father Charles was a jeweler and watchmaker who moved his family from South Lyon, Michigan to Ypsilanti, Michigan in 1919.

John attended Michigan Normal College (now Eastern Michigan University), where his interest in constructing keyboard instruments emerged.

He spent four years apprenticing with Arnold Dolmetsch in England, returning in 1930, when he set himself up building instruments in a two-story space above a dress shop in Ypsilanti. At that time he was the only harpsichord maker in America. He later moved to Detroit. When his house was condemned to build the Chrysler Freeway, he moved to New York City.

As he was the son of a jeweler, it was to be expected that Challis might include metal work in his instruments, and handmade brass hinges were a signature detail. His early instruments were traditionally constructed using traditional materials, but they evolved more than anyone else's. By the late 1950s his instruments still looked traditional from the outside, but were quite radical within: the frame and wrestplank were aluminum; bridges were brass; only the outer case was wood. Of his soundboard construction, Mr. Challis said, "This is my only secret"; Wolfgang Zuckermann (in his 1969 book The Modern Harpsichord) conjectured that they were anodized aluminum. Website postings by several harpsichord experts independently report that Challis' soundboards were not single aluminum sheets but are honeycombed.

The instruments had a clear and bright sound and stayed in tune through temperature and humidity changes. A Challis pedal harpsichord was used by E. Power Biggs on two Columbia Masterworks recordings of the music of J.S. Bach and two of Scott Joplin.

Makers who worked or apprenticed in his shop included William Dowd, Frank Rutkowski, and Stewart Pollens.

Kottick, in his authoritative A History of the Harpsichord, expresses admiration for Challis's innovative work, but also notes it was something of a dead end: during Challis's lifetime, the construction of harpsichords shifted strongly toward close imitation of the work of the historical master builders of the 18th century and earlier. Thus, Challis's harpsichords served as a something of a last hurrah for 20th century efforts to improve the harpsichord by using modern technology. The movement toward historicist construction was initiated, among others, by Challis's own student Dowd.
