= List of keyboard instruments =

A keyboard instrument is a musical instrument played using a keyboard, a row of levers which are pressed by the fingers. The most common of these are the piano, organ, and various electronic keyboards, including synthesizers and digital pianos. Other keyboard instruments include celestas, which are struck idiophones operated by a keyboard, and carillons, which are usually housed in bell towers or belfries of churches or municipal buildings.

This list categorizes keyboard instruments by their designs, and thus operations.

== Chordophones ==
Chordophones produce sound from vibrating strings:

- Bowed clavier
- Clavichord
- Clavicymbalum
- Clavinet
- Dolceola
- Electric piano
  - Electric grand piano
- Harpsichord
  - Clavicymbalum
  - Lautenwerck
- Hurdy-gurdy
- Marxophone
- Piano
  - Fortepiano
- Tangent piano
- Xenorphica

Additionally, members of the harpsichord and piano families may also use alternative setups to make the instruments more compact:

- Portable
  - Folding harpsichord
  - Orphica
- Spinets
  - Oval spinet
- Square
  - Square piano
  - Virginals
- Uprights
  - Clavicytherium
  - Upright pianos

== Aerophones ==
Aerophones produce sound primarily by causing a body of air to vibrate, without the use of strings or membranes:

- Accordion
  - Chromatic button accordion
  - Melodeon
  - Piano accordion
- Calliope
- Claviola
- Concertina
  - Bandoneon
- Harmonetta
- Pump organ
  - Harmonium
  - Regal
- Pipe organ
- Melodica

== Idiophones ==
Idiophones produce sound primarily by the vibration of the instrument itself, without the use of air flow, strings, membranes or electricity:

- Carillon
- Celesta
- Dulcitone
- Electric piano
  - Wurlitzer electric piano
  - Rhodes piano
  - Hohner Pianet
- Glasschord
- Keyboard glockenspiel
- Toy piano
- Terpodion

== Electrophones ==
Electrophones produce sound by electrical means:

- Digital piano
- Electronic keyboard
- Electronic organ
- Keytar
- Optigan
- Synthesizer
