= Frank Hubbard =

American harpsichord maker

Frank Twombly Hubbard (May 15, 1920 – February 25, 1976) was an American harpsichord maker and a pioneer in the revival of historical methods of harpsichord building.

== Student days ==
Born in New York, Hubbard studied English literature at Harvard, graduating with AB, 1942 and AM, 1947. One of his friends was William Dowd, who had an interest in early instruments, and together they constructed a clavichord. This connection, with his interest as an amateur violinist in violin making and the location of his library reading stall near the stacks holding books on musical instruments, led to Hubbard's interest in the historic harpsichord.

While pursuing graduate study at Harvard, Hubbard and Dowd both decided to leave to pursue instrument-making. In 1947, Hubbard went to England, and became an apprentice at the workshop of Arnold Dolmetsch in Haslemere. Not learning much about the historic harpsichord, he went to Hugh Gough in London in 1948, with whom he worked for a year. During this time, he was able to visit the collections of early keyboard instruments around Europe and study instruments of historical makers. He studied the viola da gamba with Edgar Hunt at the Trinity College of Music in order to get the subsistence allowance that the G.I. Bill offered, though with his instrument-making, he had no time to practise.

== Historical harpsichords ==
Hubbard returned to the USA in 1949 and founded a workshop with Dowd building harpsichords on historical principles, rather than the 20th-century modern (now known as 'revival') style practised by virtually all professional makers, such as Robert Goble. Hubbard & Dowd found work performing restorations of harpsichords in public and private collections which helped them improve their own practises of design and construction. In 1958 the partnership ended and Hubbard formed his own workshop on the Lyman estate in Waltham, Dowd opening a larger workshop in Cambridge.

From 1955–1958, with a Fulbright Fellowship, American Philosophical Society Grant and Belgium American Educational Foundation CRB Fellowship, he was able to examine many more instrumental collections in Europe. From 1967 to 1968, he set up the restoration workshop for the Musée Instrumental at the Paris Conservatoire. In the 1970s, he taught courses at Harvard and Boston University. At the time of the publication of his book, Three Centuries of Harpsichord Making, in 1965, Ralph Kirkpatrick wrote that "he unquestionably knows more about the history and construction of harpsichords than anyone alive today".

He developed a harpsichord in 1963 based on a Pascal Taskin instrument of 1769 which was sold as a do-it-yourself kit. It included a manual and all the crucial parts, with the wooden items planed to the correct thickness but otherwise requiring finishing. In this way any person with a good grasp of woodworking and basic knowledge of harpsichord making, with dedication and careful work, was able to produce a fine instrument. By 1975, approximately 1000 of these instruments had been produced. Some of Hubbard "kit harpsichords" have been (and still are now in the 21st century) used as first-rate instruments in public recitals worldwide.

An amateur violinist, he also restored a number of early violins to their original state and made early (pre-Tourte) bows for instruments of the viol and violin families. He has been described as "a gentleman of the 18th and 20th centuries, an Anglophile and Francophile who seemed to disapprove of most things German and Italian." He died in 1976 in Wellesley, Massachusetts.

== Hubbard's thoughts on the harpsichord ==
About the revival of authentic instruments for early music:

This man, this composer from the past, had a talent greater than anything I will ever have. He used the means at his disposal in an imaginative way that staggers my imagination. Therefore, the only word I can apply is arrogance to the people who feel they can devise a harpsichord more suitable to his music than the instrument he had, because he wrote his music for that harpsichord. That's why I feel so strongly that one should attempt to return to the original instruments. To enter the past to this extent is anything but sterile; it is extremely creative. This is essentially what I am trying to do. To do my part in reviving this music. And every so often I see that people are making steps in this direction. Someone like Gustav Leonhardt comes along who has a completely new approach when compared with early 20th century approaches, to let's say, the unmeasured preludes of Couperin or the very free 17th century music. There are now groups of musicians approaching this music much as it was approached during the time that it was written.

The ideal harpsichord sound:

First, the harpsichord must stay out of the way; you must be able to hear what the player is doing, what his thoughts are. The second is to contribute something to the music; that is, to add some beauty of sound which might not be immediately imaginable to you if you were looking at the notes on a page. One you might regard as a negative quality, that of not interfering; and the other as a positive commentary. Further, in the best harpsichords you will find surprises, such as a sudden reedy brilliance in the tenor, or a profound bass, or the clarity of a bell-like sound in the treble. But all this must be very carefully tempered. The instrument must not have sustaining power that is too great, because one note will then obscure the one that follows; you must not have one part of the instrument that is too effective at the cost of another. Of course, it is difficult to find an instrument which is perfect for all things.

Bach and Scarlatti's instruments:

We have no reason to connect Bach with those large instruments from Hamburg that immediately spring to mind when we think of German instruments. My feeling is that Bach probably was playing on instruments of the Saxon school. We should think of his instrument as not being very different from that of Rameau or Couperin. The Saxon instruments had a tendency to be 2x8', 1x4' doubles, and were very similar in many ways to instruments in the Franco-Flemish tradition. We always used to think of Scarlatti as par excellence the harpsichord composer; play him on a Steinway grand and no question it's terrible. But I am not so sure that some of the qualities that you hear in a fortepiano might not be desirable for Scarlatti.

What we still don't know about the history of the harpsichord:

Of course, the great enigma is where it all came from—the early period of the harpsichord; but that is something that is very difficult to throw any more light on.

== Books ==
- Frank Hubbard: Three Centuries of Harpsichord Making (Harvard University Press, 1965); ISBN 0-674-88845-6 – the authoritative work on the history and construction of the harpsichord when it was published.
- Frank Hubbard: Harpsichord Regulating and Repairing (Tuner's Supply Inc., 1962); ASIN: B0007DXD2C
- Reconstructing the Harpsichord, The Historical Harpsichord: a Monograph Series in Honor of Frank Hubbard, ed. Howard Schott (Pendragon Press, 1983), 1–16

== See also ==
- List of historical harpsichord makers

== Sources ==
- Howard Schott: 'Hubbard, Frank (Twombly)', Grove Music Online ed. L. Macy (Accessed June 8, 2007), http://www.grovemusic.com
- Interview by Hal Haney in Harpsichord, vol.5, no. 1, April 1972.
- Interview by Tom McGeary in The English Harpsichord Magazine, vol.11, no.4, April 1975
- Habit of Perfection – Tribute to Frank Hubbard by Michael Steinberg in the Boston Globe, February 1976
