= Couchet =

Flemish family of instrument makers

The Couchet family were Flemish harpsichord and virginal makers in Antwerp, closely associated with, and descendants of, the Ruckers family.

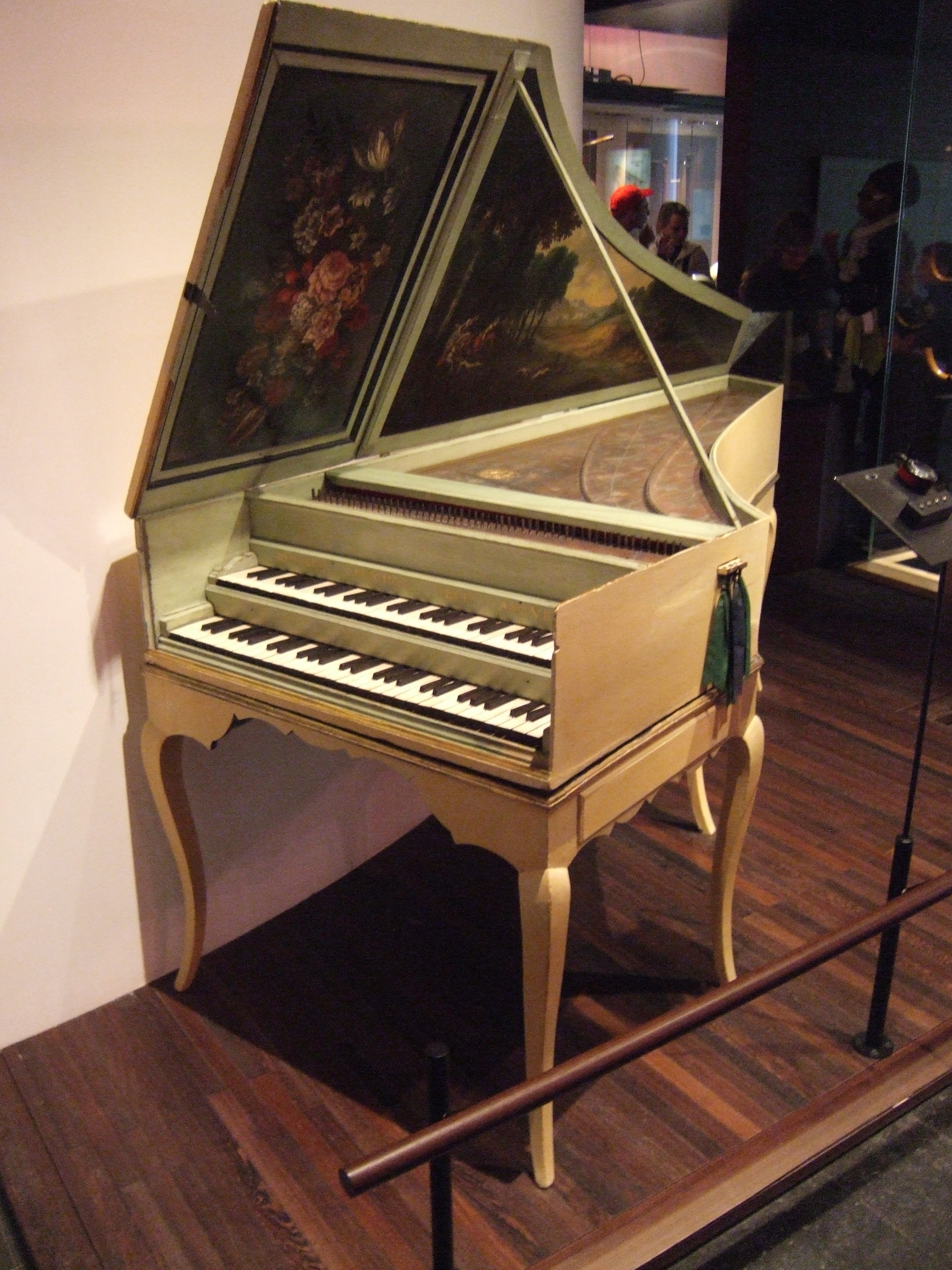
Harpsichord by Jan Couchet, 1646 with later ravalement, MIM Brussels

Joannes Couchet (or Jan Couchet) (2 February 1615 – 30 March 1655) was a grandson of Hans Ruckers. He became the apprentice of his uncle Joannes Ruckers in 1626 and became a master after the latter's death in 1642. There are five instruments known to be by Joannes Couchet still in existence, most of which have had ravalements, all dating from around 1650. Three of his seven children became harpsichord makers:

Angela van den Brant was married to Joannes Couchet and following his death, she worked with Simon Hagaerts to maintain her late husband's workshop and train her sons.

Petrus Joannes Couchet became a master harpsichord maker and member of the Guild of St Luke in 1655 or 1656;

Joseph Joannes Couchet became a member in 1666 or 1667. His instruments in existence today are a single manual harpsichord dated 1671 (possibly by Petrus Joannes), given a ravalement and made into a double manual by Pascal Taskin in 1778; a single manual harpsichord dated 1679; and a double manual harpsichord dated 1680 and again given a grand ravalement by Taskin in 1781; a similar unsigned instrument likewise worked on by Taskin may also have been his.

Maria Abraham Couchet likewise became a member of the guild in 1666 or 1667.

Joannes Couchet's instruments are virtually identical to those of the Ruckers family; some later instruments signed by Joannes Ruckers were probably made by Joannes Couchet during his apprenticeship. The Couchet family went on to make further innovations to the models established by Ruckers, building a double manual harpsichord with extended range of FF to d''', and sometimes introducing registrations of 8' 8' or 8' 8' 4' instead of the then-usual 8' 4'. Joseph Joannes Couchet made a harpsichord (1679) with two sets of jacks for one 8' set of strings.
