= Jean Germain =

Jean Germain may refer to:

- Jean Germain (bishop of Chalon-sur-Saône and Auxerre) (died 1361/1362), see bishop of Auxerre
- Jean Germain (bishop of Nevers and Chalon-sur-Saône) (died 1461), see bishop of Nevers
- Jean Germain I (1703–1777), also known as Joannes Goermans, French harpsichord maker, see Goermans
- Jean Germain II (1735–c. 1795), his son, French harpsichord maker, see Goermans
- Jean Germain (politician) (1947–2015), French politician
