= Goermans =

The Goermans (or Germain) family were French harpsichord makers of Flemish origin.

Jean Germain I (or Joannes Goermans, as he signed his instruments) (1703 – 18 February 1777) was born in Geldern, Western Germany, and is known to have been working as a harpsichord maker in Paris by 1730, where he remained for the rest of his life. He had seven children: his daughter Jeanne-Thérèse was a harpist and friend of Jean-Philippe Rameau's patron La Pouplinière. He retired in 1773 after starting to suffer from paralysis. At his death he was very rich, owning property worth 195,000 livres. His workshop was taken over by his son-in-law Jean Liborius Hermès.

Jean Germain II (1735 – c.1795) was the eldest son of the above, and became known as a dealer of harpsichords and harps as well as a harpsichord teacher. He lived in Paris. He dealt mainly in Flemish ravalements of Ruckers instruments, popular in France at the time; the adaptations to the original harpsichords included knee levers for changing stops, and an enlarged range. In 1778 he advertised a Ruckers ravalement which went as far as 'producing the effect of the Flute, Oboe and Vox humana'.

Jacques Germain (variants: Jacob Germain, Jacobus Goermans, Jacques Goermans) (c. 1740 – 8 April 1789) was the son of the first Jean Germain and followed him into the craft of harpsichord-making, living his life in Paris. He established a workshop in his father's house, becoming a master maker in 1766. He made fortepianos after public taste started to favour them, and was an important early French maker of the instrument. After his death, Hermès took over the business as he had done with his father's. The production of pianos and harps continued until Hermès's death in 1813.

Surviving Goermans harpsichords are in the French style; one of the most notable is the Goermans/Taskin in the Russell Collection, Edinburgh, which has been highly praised for its sound quality and has been used by leading harpsichordists such as Trevor Pinnock for recordings of the French baroque repertoire. A notable oddity produced by Jacques Goermans in 1782 was a harpsichord with 21 keys to the octave using a tuning system suggested by Jean-Benjamin de la Borde.

== Sources ==
- Sheridan Germann: 'Goermans [Germain]', Grove Music Online ed. L. Macy (Accessed 2007-05-20), http://www.grovemusic.com/

== See also ==
- List of historical harpsichord makers

== See also ==
List of historical harpsichord makers
