= Ruckers =

Family of harpsichord and virginal makers from the Southern Netherlands

The Ruckers family (variants: Ruckaert, Ruckaerts, Rucqueer, Rueckers, Ruekaerts, Ruijkers, Rukkers, Rycardt) were harpsichord and virginal makers from the Southern Netherlands based in Antwerp in the 16th and 17th century. Their influence stretched well into the 18th century, and to the harpsichord revival of the 20th.

The Ruckers family contributed immeasurably to the harpsichord's technical development, pioneering the addition of a second manual; the quality of their instruments is such that the name of Ruckers is as important to early keyboard instruments as that of Stradivarius is to the violin family. In the 18th century, Ruckers instruments were often modified by French makers in a process known as ravalement, to allow for an extended range and other additions.

== The Ruckers family ==
The family probably originated in Germany. The earliest known member, Hans Ruckers, was from Weissenburg, according to documents from 1530 in the Antwerp city archives, and the similarly named Arnold Rucker was a German organ builder in the city in 1520.

Hans Ruckers (1540s–1598) was born in Mechelen. In 1575 he married Adriana Cnaeps; harpsichord maker Marten van der Biest was a witness at the wedding, though it is not known what their working relationship was. Hans Ruckers was a Catholic and had 11 children, two of whom became harpsichord makers, and his daughter Catharina (to whom harpsichord maker Willem Gompaerts (c.1534 – after 1600) was godfather) married into the instrument-making Couchet family, ensuring a strong continuation of both dynasties; his son Joannes continued in the family craft. Hans Ruckers became a member of the Guild of St Luke in 1579, and a citizen of Antwerp in 1594; he lived very near the artist Rubens in the Jodenstraat. He signed his instruments by working his initials into the rose. Instruments by him in existence today are virginals from the 1580s and 1590s now in Berlin, Bruges, New York, Paris and Yale University. He was also an organ builder, though none by him remains; he is known to have worked on the organs of St. Jacobskerk and Antwerp Cathedral.

Joannes Ruckers (variants: Ioannes, Hans, Jan) (15 January 1578 – 29 September 1642) was the first son of Hans Ruckers, and also became a harpsichord and organ maker. He lived his life in Antwerp. He and brother Andreas became partners in their father's business upon his death, Joannes becoming sole owner in 1608. He joined the Guild of St Luke in 1611; his entry reads 'Hans Rukers, sone, claversigmaker'; following this he engraved 'IR' into the rose of his instruments, rather than his father's 'HR'. He worked for the archdukes of the Netherlands in Brussels from 1616. His nephew Joannes Couchet joined his workshop around 1627, taking it over after his death. Around 35 of his instruments are in existence today.

Andreas Ruckers I (or Andries) (30 August 1579 – after 1645) was the second son of Hans Ruckers, and likewise became a harpsichord maker based in Antwerp. In 1605 he married; three of his children survived to adulthood. Details of his life are scarce after he sold his share in the family business to his brother Joannes in 1608. He remained a harpsichord maker, was still alive in September 1645 and may have lived ten years or more after that date. His surviving instruments are dated from 1607 to 1644, and are in collections all over the world.

Andreas Ruckers II (or Andries) (31 March 1607 – before 1667) was the son of Andreas Ruckers I, from whom he learned his craft. A 1638 entry in the records of the Guild of St Luke that reads, "Rickart, claversingelmaker, wijnmeester" may refer to him. He married Joanna Hechts that year; they had six children, and she died of the plague in 1653. Seven of his instruments, built in the 1640s and 1650s, are known to exist in collections around the world. He was the last of the Ruckers family under that name. See Couchet for another branch of the family.

There may have been another Ruckers maker as yet unidentified: two virginals built in the 17th-century Ruckers tradition have similar roses with the initials 'CR'; they were once thought to have been the work of Christoffel Ruckers, a 16th-century organ player living in Dendermonde, but he is now generally excluded as a possible maker.

== Ruckers harpsichords and virginals ==
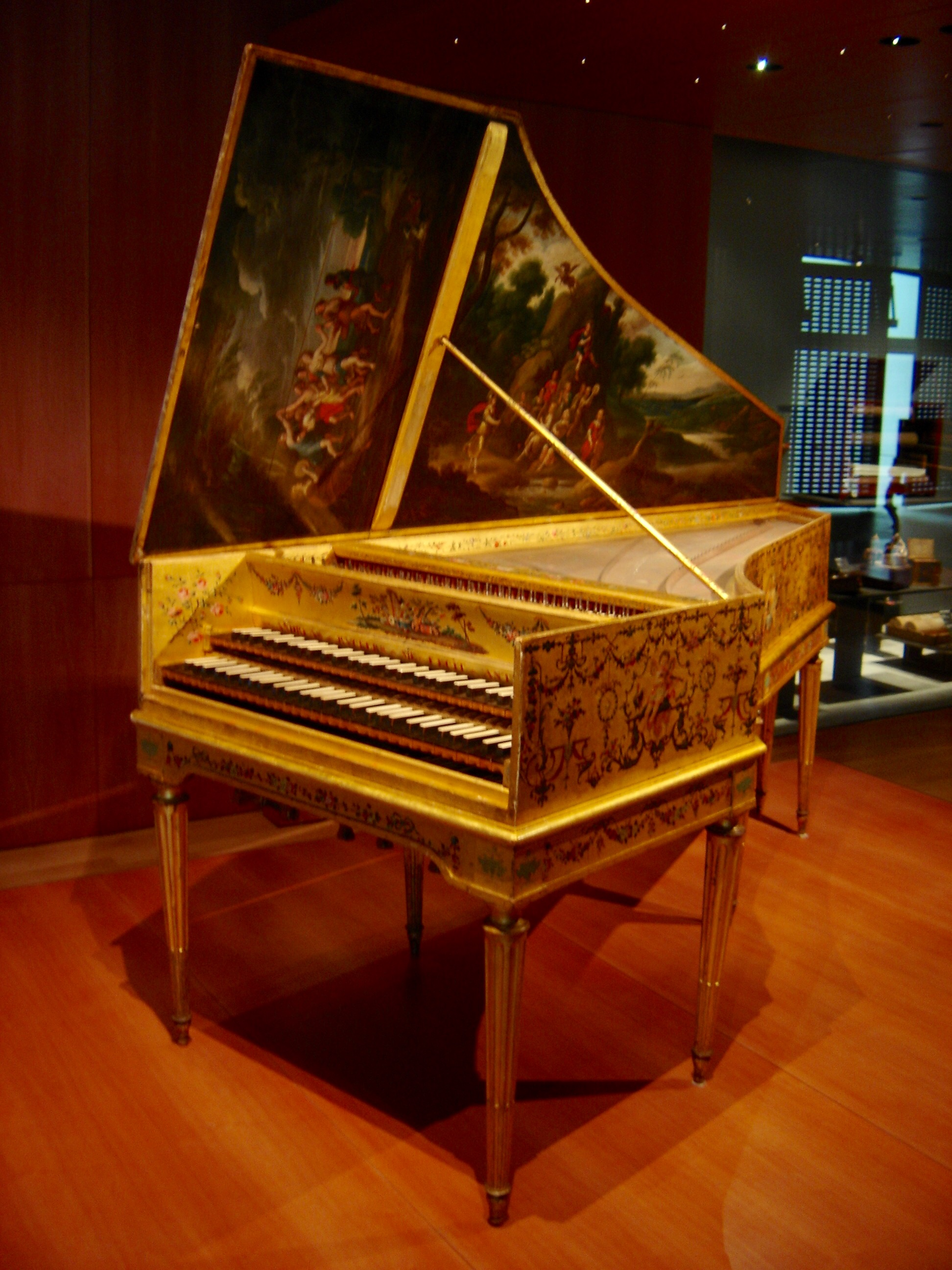
This harpsichord is the work of two celebrated makers: originally constructed by Andreas Ruckers in Antwerp (1646), it was later remodeled and expanded by Pascal Taskin in Paris (1780).

Existing virginals made by the Ruckers family are rectangular (one is six-sided) with the keyboard positioned either to the left (spinet) or right (muselar) of centre and a single set of strings running parallel to the long side. Spinetten had their plucking point near the end of the string, while muselaars had a plucking point close to the middle of the string; the difference in sound between the two is easily audible. The pitch of the instrument varied according to its size; the largest sounded at the standard pitch of the time, something like a'=415 Hz, while smaller virginals were pitched a tone, 4th, 5th, 8ve or a 9th higher.

Some virginals were built as double instruments, with a normal-pitch instrument combined with one pitched an octave higher; this was known as 'the mother with the child', marked 'M' (Moeder) and 'k' (kind) as the smaller instrument was normally stored in a space beside the keyboard of the larger. The actions combined when the octave instrument was fitted on top of the regular one, enabling the musician to play both at once. They occasionally built other compound instruments, fitting a virginal into the empty space left by the harpsichord's bentside.

Both single and double manual harpsichords made by the Ruckers family had the disposition 8' 4', with each keyboard having a set of jacks for each set of strings. The standard compass of the Ruckers keyboard is from short octave C/E to c''' or d'''. Double manual harpsichords had their keyboards uncoupled and aligned to sound a 4th (occasionally a 5th) apart, with the upper manual at standard pitch and the lower pitched below it; when each manual was being used the jacks of the other manual were disengaged. The Ruckers double manual harpsichord thus worked as two instruments in one, pitched a 4th apart. Later two-manual harpsichords keyboards had the two sets of strings tuned together or antiphonally at the same pitch, for timbral contrasts.

Variations of the standard models were sometimes produced for export to France or England; there are single manual harpsichords with chromatic basses (rather than the short octave) down to C, probably intended for England, and double manual harpsichords with a lower-manual range of GG to c''' and an upper manual range of F to f''', produced for France, the lower manual being at standard pitch and the upper a 4th below, reversing the usual pitch arrangement. The lower manual range of these instruments suits the music of contemporary French harpsichord composers such as Chambonnières and Louis Couperin, while the upper manual range is close to early French organ design.

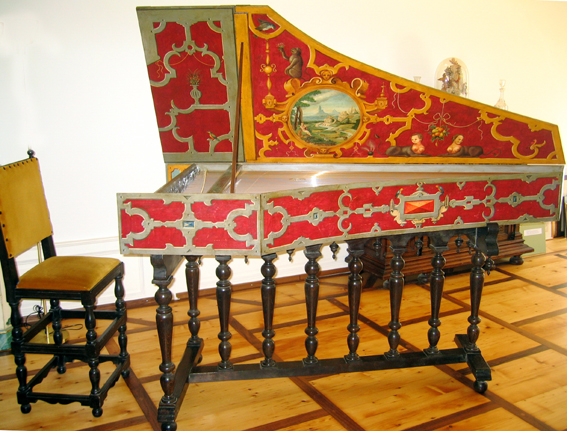
A Flemish harpsichord after the Ruckers school, decorated with faux iron strapwork and jewels.

When constructing an instrument, a number was written on the case and many of the parts of the action, along with a serial number depending on the model. This has let researchers learn much more about undated instruments and helped them estimate the rate of production—calculated at up to 35 to 40 instruments per year.

Decoration of an instrument was as careful and elaborate as its construction; repeating Renaissance patterns were block-printed onto paper and placed inside the keywell and around the inside of the case above the soundboard. Large Latin mottoes were printed similarly on a wood-grained paper on the inside of the lid. Alternatively, the lid was painted by artists such as Rubens and Brueghel. The exterior was painted in imitation of marble or huge jewels held by iron strapwork. The rose in the soundboard is surrounded by a painted wreath of flowers and other flora and fauna in tempera. The roses used by all members of the Ruckers family show an angel playing a harp, with the initials of the builder on each side of it; the date was found either on the soundboard or the wrest plank.

== Legacy and the French practice of ravalement ==
Ruckers instruments have been valued for their resonant, balanced tone, which was achieved through their design and craftsmanship. They are still studied as a model by harpsichord makers today.

In the 17th and 18th centuries, Ruckers instruments were more highly valued than those of any other maker, and the tone was regarded as an ideal in most of Northern Europe. This led to the inevitable production of counterfeits by unscrupulous makers, of which some survive today and have been firmly identified as such, but also an updating and rebuilding of true Ruckers instruments to suit modern tastes. Particularly in Paris, Ruckers harpsichords were extended in range and sometimes completely rebuilt (by makers such as Blanchet, Taskin and Goermans) in a process called ravalement or grand ravalement, with re-alignment of two-manual keyboards at the unison, replacement of the action and redecoration of the case. The characteristic Ruckers tone was ensured by keeping the soundboard unaltered; some makers used only the original soundboard, advertising the final instrument as a 'Ruckers'.

Such was the lasting influence of Ruckers that their methods of construction had been absorbed by the major harpsichord-making traditions of England, France, Germany, Flanders and Scandinavia by the mid-18th century.

== See also ==
- List of historical harpsichord makers
