= Pascal Taskin =

Belgium-born French harpsichord and piano maker

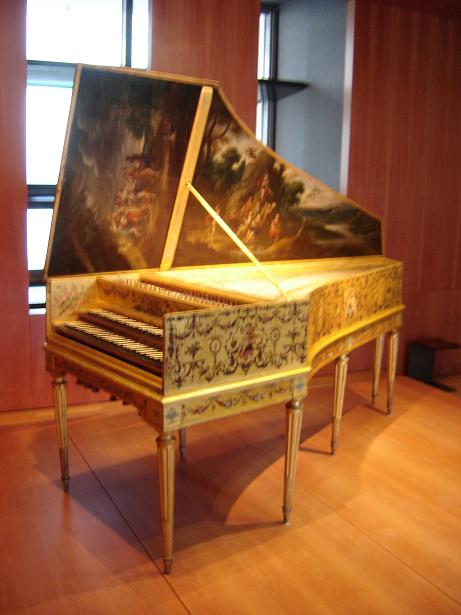
Andreas Ruckers 1646 / Taskin 1780 harpsichord, (Paris, Musée de la Musique)

Pascal-Joseph Taskin (27 July 1723 – 9 February 1793) was a Holy Roman Empire-born French harpsichord and piano maker.

== Biography ==
Pascal Taskin, born in Theux near Liège, worked in Paris for most of his life. Upon his arrival in Paris, he apprenticed in the workshop of François-Étienne Blanchet II. Little else is known of his activity until Blanchet's death on April 27, 1766. In early November of that year, he became a master harpsichord maker in the guild of instrument makers and took over the Blanchet workshop, and by the end of that month, he had married Blanchet's widow. The continuity between the Blanchet and Taskin traditions is indicated by the note Taskin attached to his instruments until 1770:

PASCAL TASKIN, Facteur de
clavessins du Roi, Élève et
successeur de M. BLANCHET,
demeure même Maison rue de la
Verrerie, vis-à-vis la petite
porte de S. Merry A PARIS

Taskin inherited Blanchet's title of royal harpsichord maker (facteur des clavessins du Roi) and additionally became keeper of King Louis XV’s instruments alongside Christophe Chiquelier in 1770, though he only fully occupied that role when Chiquelier retired in 1774, the year of Louis XVI's ascension. In order to carry out both of his duties as both a maker and keeper of musical instruments, he set up a workshop in Versailles in 1777 and hired his nephew, Pascal-Joseph Taskin II (1750–1829), to work there; his other nephews Henry Taskin and Lambert Taskin also worked for him, though little is known of them. Pascal Joseph II went on to work in the Blanchet workshop in 1763 and, like his uncle, married into the family in 1777 with his wedding to François Etienne Blanchet II's daughter. After his death in 1793, Pascal Taskin was succeeded by his stepson, Armand-François-Nicolas Blanchet, whom he had brought up himself.

== Harpsichords and pianos ==
Pascal Taskin built on and refined the already excellent Blanchet harpsichord-making tradition. He is credited with introducing genouillères (knee-levers) with which to control the stop combinations, and a new register of jacks using peau de buffle (soft buff leather) plectra, instead of the usual quill, in 1768.

He continued the common French practice, pursued successfully by Blanchet, of making ravalements of Ruckers and Couchet harpsichords, which involved rebuilding the 17th century Flemish instruments, which were highly valued for their sound quality, to suit the modern French tastes. Like other makers of the time, he resorted to selling 'Ruckers' harpsichords which had very few original parts, or none at all, such was the premium associated with the name by then; his last known instrument, a double dated 1788, has a rose signed "Andreas Ruckers" and a Flemish-style painted soundboard. Unlike other makers, his instruments were always of excellent quality, whether passed off as Ruckers or not.

He began to build fortepianos with Blanchet in the 1760s, probably originally modelled after those of Gottfried Silbermann, with a Bartolomeo Cristofori-type action. None of his early pianos survives; the earliest date from the late 1780s and have a very simple action without escapement, which he devised in order to reduce friction. These instruments have luxuriant veneering of the Louis XVI style. Another instrument he made was the Armandine, a large psaltery with gut strings resembling a harpsichord without a keyboard, in 1790 for Anne-Aimée Armand (1774–1846); a surviving example is in the Musée de la Musique, Paris. Taskin's workshop became more occupied with piano production and the importing of English square pianos in the 1770s and 1780s, but not to the detriment of harpsichords; his death inventory of 1793 shows an equal number of each instrument under construction.

There are seven of his double manual harpsichords still in existence; they are prime examples of the late French school of harpsichord building, with a warm and rich tone, range of FF–f''', and disposition of 8' 8' 4' and buff stop. His 1769 double and the 1763/1783–1784 Goermans/Taskin (which Taskin tried to pass off as a Couchet by filing away the initials 'JG' to 'IC') have both been praised as ideal instruments for the late French baroque repertoire such as the works of Rameau and Armand-Louis Couperin. The Yale University Collection of Musical Instruments houses a 1770 double. These instruments have been studied and copied many times by modern makers.

== See also ==
- List of historical harpsichord makers
