= Folding harpsichord =

Keyboard instrument

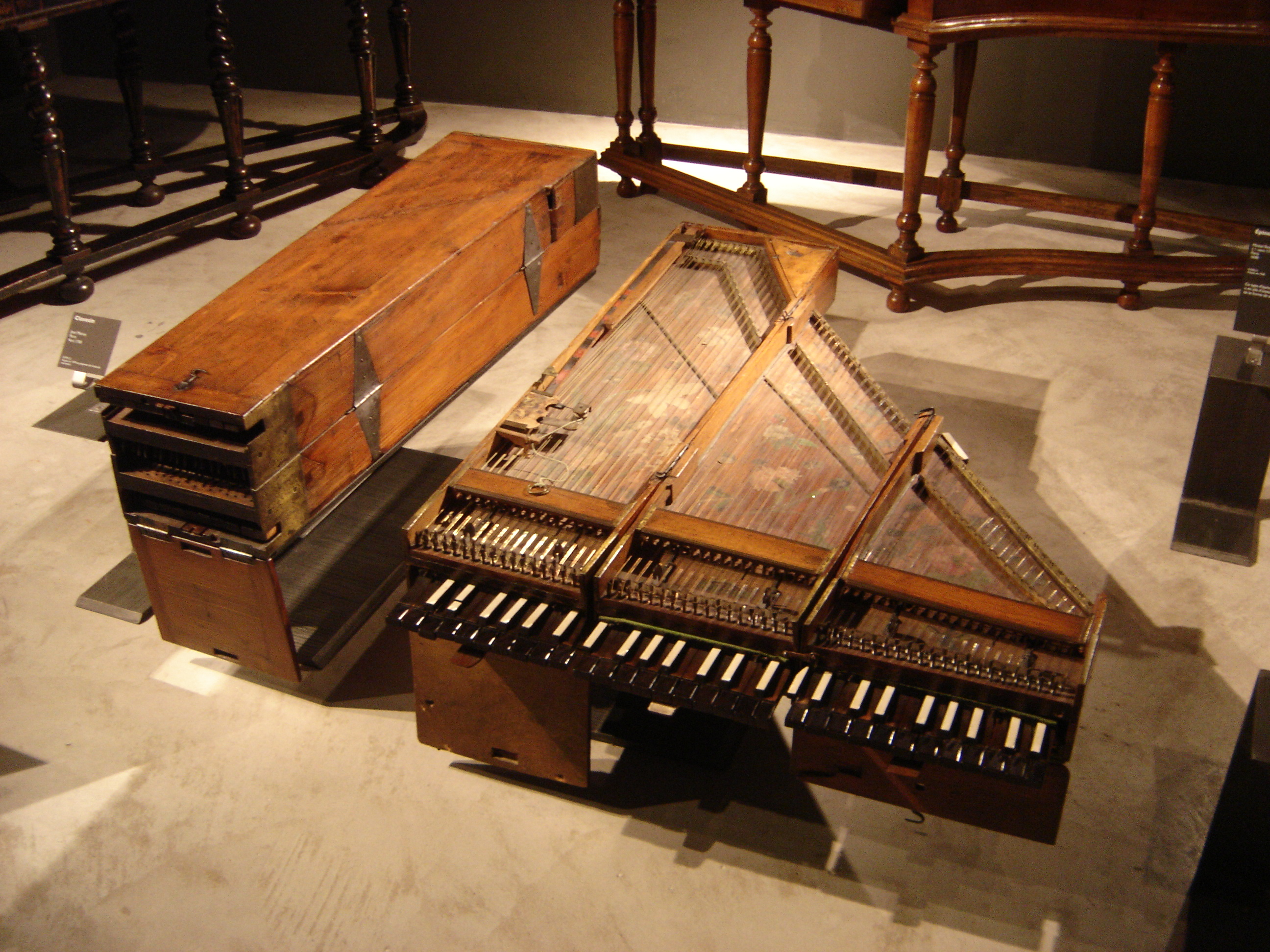
Two folding harpsichords by Jean Marius, Musée de la Musique, Paris. The instrument on the left is displayed in its folded state.

The folding harpsichord was a kind of harpsichord meant for travel. Since it could be folded up into a fairly compact space, it was more easily transported than a conventional harpsichord. The folding took place on hinges and was in the longitudinal dimension, preserving the tension on the strings. The folded instrument formed a package about the size of a large suitcase.

It is sometimes called by its French equivalent, clavecin brisé, which means "broken harpsichord," or by the German term, Reisecembalo, which means "travel harpsichord."

== Method of folding ==
As can be seen in the first illustration, the folding harpsichord is built in three separate sections. The folding scheme relies on the fact that the two smaller sections each terminate with a sharply angled segment at the end away from the player. A hinge is placed connecting the far apex of the smallest section to its neighbor. When the smallest section is fully rotated counterclockwise on this hinge, its angled segment abuts that of its neighbor (the join can be seen on in the detail figure below). At this point, the two smaller sections form a single rectangle, similar in size to the longest section. This larger rectangle is then folded vertically on additional hinges (visible) so that it is aligned with the longest section. Once the keyboards are slid inward like drawers and the end covers are folded shut, the instrument is in its compact and portable form.

Detail of the image above showing how the instrument is folded. The diagonal join between the two shorter sections is visible.

== History ==
It is not certain who invented the folding harpsichord. In 1700, the French harpsichord maker Jean Marius presented his instrument to the Académie des Sciences, and was granted a 20-year patent for it. However, Laurence Libin found tentative evidence that the original inventor was a builder named Giuseppe Mondini, a cleric from Imola, Italy who worked in the 17th century.

Marius's claim to be the original inventor was disputed at the time he made it by the Paris guild of instrument makers, to which he did not belong. Marius succeeded in fending off the guild's legal challenge and "registered his letters patent from the king in the parliament of Paris (on 30 Sept 1702)." (Cohen 2009b).

Among the early owners of a folding harpsichord were the Medici family of Florence. An inventory of the Medici instruments made by Bartolomeo Cristofori in 1716 records the presence of one in the collection; Libin judges that it was probably made by Marius. The instrument was likely the purchase of Grand Prince Ferdinando, an avid collector of musical instruments under whose auspices Cristofori invented the piano.

Frederick the Great of Prussia, a devotee of both war and music, took a folding harpsichord with him on his campaigns. The instrument belonged to his grandmother, Queen Sophia Charlotte. As Kottick observes "it is fairly complex for a traveling instrument"; there are three choirs of strings (disposition 2 x 8', 1 x 4'). The range is GG/BB to c^{3}, with a short octave in the bass. Kottick also notes: "It even includes a device to give the tuning note. The atypical soundboard painting consists of not only flowers and insects, but also wrought-iron patterns and figures from the commedia dell'arte, one of whom is doing something naughty to another."

A folding harpsichord may have been owned by Prince Leopold of Anhalt-Cöthen during the time he employed Johann Sebastian Bach as his Kapellmeister. The prince took Bach and his musicians with him when he traveled. A record from the Cöthen court shows a payment to Bach (March 1723) for requilling the plectra of "das Reise Clavesin" ("the traveling harpsichord").

The famous castrato Farinelli (Carlo Broschi) owned two folding harpsichords, mentioned in his will from 1782.

In modern times, portability continues to be an issue for harpsichordists, and the Italian builder Augusto Bonza has produced new instruments modeled after an original built ca. 1700 by Carlo Grimaldi (see below). Bonza's full-size folding harpsichord weighs about 10 kilograms (22 pounds) and fits within a space of 110 by 23.5 cm.

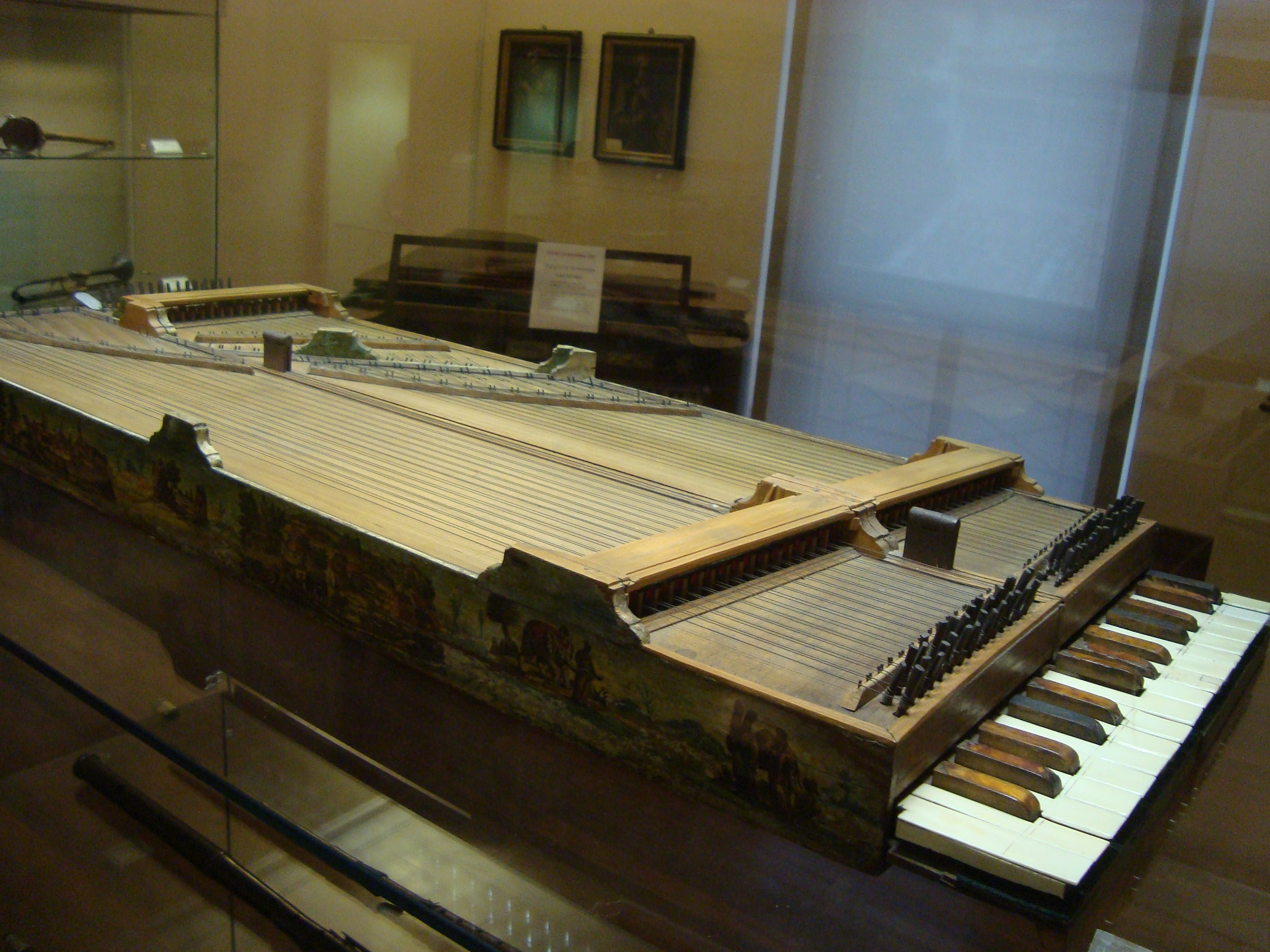
The Grimaldi folding harpsichord in the Museo Nazionale degli Strumenti Musicale in Rome. It is shown folded "halfway", with the rightmost section pivoted to align it with the middle section.

== Surviving historical folding harpsichords ==
- Five of Marius's folding harpsichords survive. Two, both from 1700, are in the Musée de la Musique in Paris, and are shown in the photograph above. One (1709) is in the Musical Instrument Museum in Brussels, and one is in the Musikinstrumenten-Museum in Leipzig. The fifth, King Frederick's instrument, is kept in the Staatliches Institut für Musikforschung in Berlin. According to Cohen, Marius's instruments "had jacks of metal and strings spun of gold and silver, and could be equipped with a pedal to regulate dynamics."
- A folding harpsichord from the early 18th century by the Italian builder Carlo Grimaldi is kept in the Museo Nazionale degli Strumenti Musicale in Rome.
- An Italian folding harpsichord from the early 18th century in the Tagliavini Collection - Museo di San Colombano in Bologna.
- The Rijksmuseum in Amsterdam has a folding harpsichord from 1768, constructed by the organ builder Rijk van Arkel, who worked in Gouda.
- The Metropolitan Museum of Art in New York owns two folding harpsichords. One was built in 1757 by Christianus Nonnemacker, who worked probably in Genoa. The other is an anonymous instrument fairly similar to Nonnemacker's.
- An anonymous folding harpsichord, possibly formerly in the Boddington collection, forms part of the Charles van Raalte instrument collection now on display in Dean Castle, Kilmarnock.

== Assessment ==
According to Libin, "documentary evidence and surviving examples confirm that folding harpsichords were esteemed outside France as well as within." However, folding harpsichords have not always been positively assessed by modern scholars. Kottick and Lucktenberg judge that "their utility was no doubt balanced by their somewhat dubious musical worth." Good calls them "convenient for traveling but for little else." Libin's own verdict is less harsh; they "sacrifice loudness for convenience of transport".
