= Harpsichord =

Plucked-string keyboard instrument

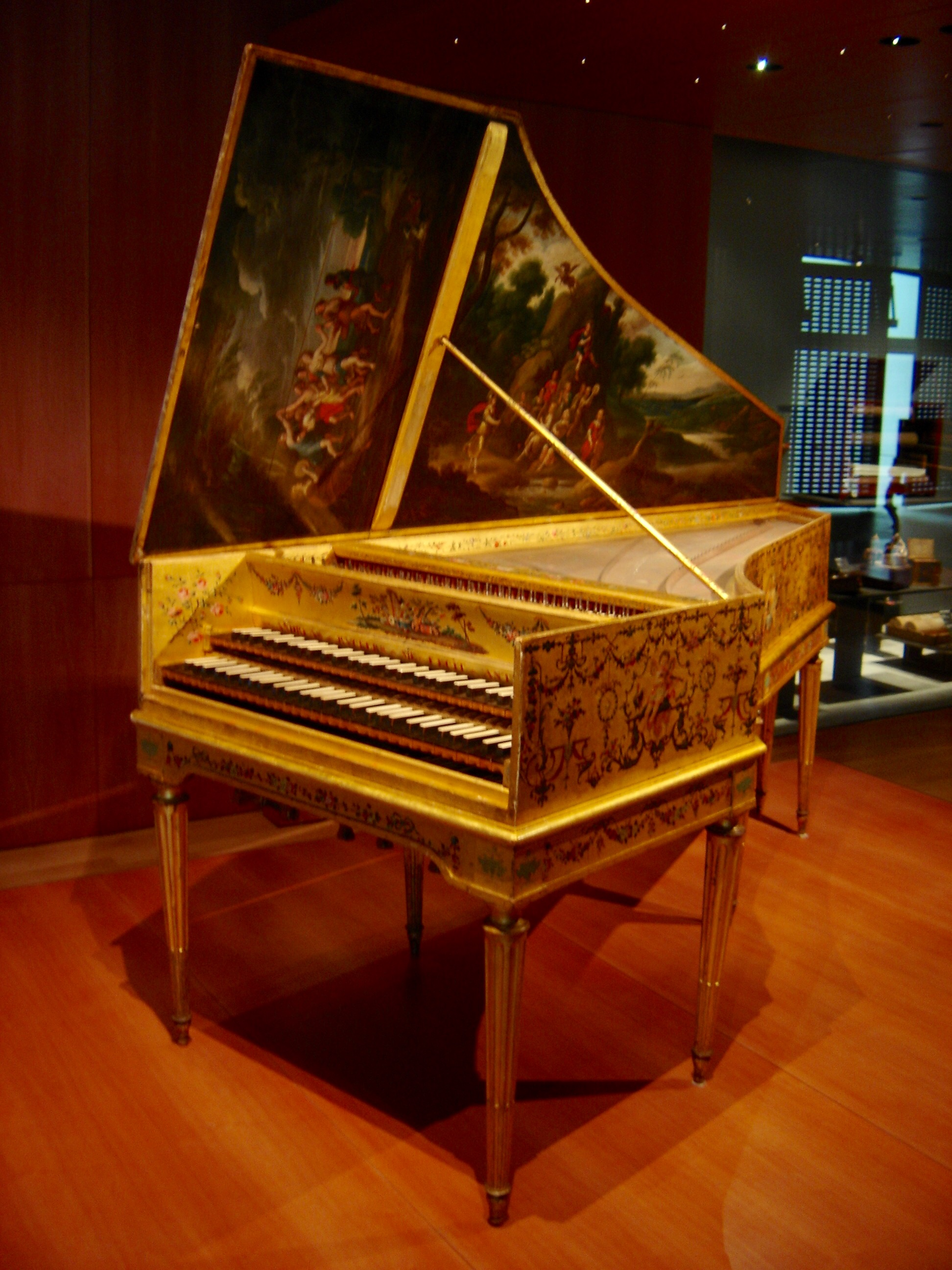
This harpsichord is the work of two celebrated makers: originally constructed by Andreas Ruckers in Antwerp (1646), it was later remodeled and expanded in a process called grand ravalement by Pascal Taskin in Paris (1780).

A harpsichord (Note: Italian: clavicembalo; French: clavecin; German: Cembalo; Spanish: clavecín; Portuguese: cravo; Russian: клавеси́н, romanized: klavesín; Dutch: klavecimbel; Polish: klawesyn) is a keyboard instrument that makes its sound by plucking a set of strings. In a harpsichord, depressing a key raises its back end within the instrument, which in turn lifts one or more jacks, each a thin strip of wood holding a small plectrum made from quill or plastic; each plectrum plucks a single string. The strings are under tension on a soundboard, which is mounted in a wooden case; the soundboard amplifies the vibrations from the strings so that the listeners can hear them. Harpsichord often include more than one choir of strings. Various devices are used to select which choir will sound when playing; these can include simple levers, or in more elaborate instruments the deployment of more than one keyboard. (Note: In virtually all instances, "more than one" means two. For the one known three-manual instrument, see Hieronymus Albrecht Hass. For forged three-manual instruments, see Leopoldo Franciolini.)

The term denotes the whole family of similar plucked-keyboard instruments, including the smaller virginals, muselar, and spinet. The harpsichord was widely used in Renaissance and Baroque music, both for purposes of accompaniment and as a solo instrument. During the Baroque era, the harpsichord was a standard part of the continuo group. During the late 18th century, with the spread of the piano, the harpsichord gradually disappeared from the musical scene (except in opera, where it continued to be used to accompany recitative). In the 20th century, it made a resurgence, being used in historically informed performance of older music, in new compositions, and in certain styles of popular music.

== History ==
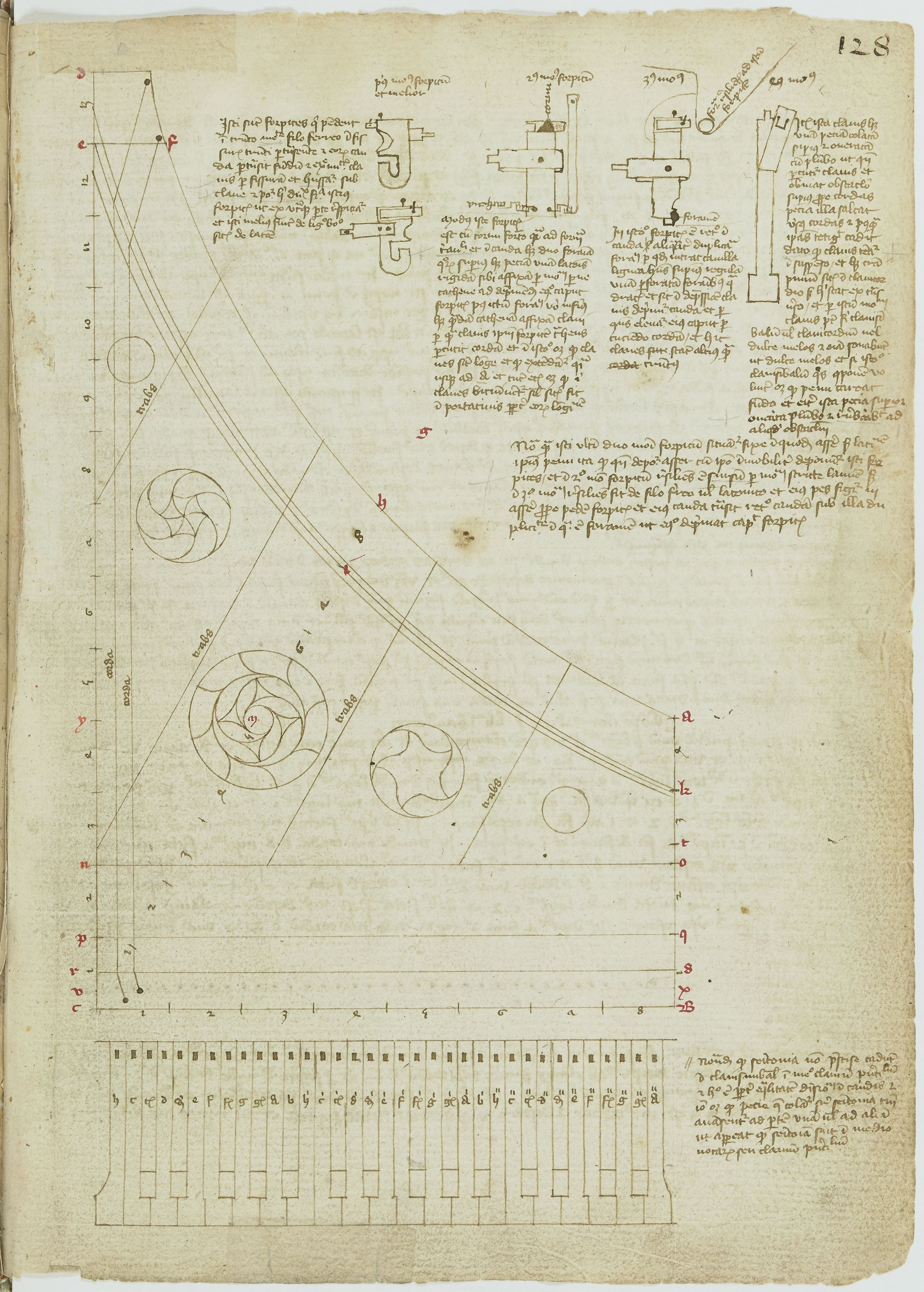
An early diagram of a vertical harpsichord (clavicytherium) by Arnault de Zwolle, c. 1430

Johann Sebastian Bach – Prelude in C major, BWV 846
Performed by Robert Schröter on a French harpsichord

Domenico Scarlatti – Sonata in D minor K. 9, Allegretto
Performed by Martha Goldstein on an Italian harpsichord

Johann Sebastian Bach – English Suite No. 1 in A major, BWV 806 – prelude
Performed by Martha Goldstein on a Flemish harpsichord

Adriano Banchieri – The Battle
Performed by Sylvia Kind on a harpsichord of the type made in the early 20th century

The harpsichord was most likely invented in the late 14th century. The earliest instruments were quite small and sounded at relatively high pitch. By the 16th century, harpsichord makers in Italy had evolved a design that survived well into later centuries: lightweight instruments with thin case walls and low tension brass strings arranged in two choirs with a single manual. A different approach was taken in the Southern Netherlands starting in the late 16th century, notably by the Ruckers family. Their harpsichords used a heavier construction and produced a more powerful and distinctive tone with higher tension steel treble stringing. These included the first harpsichords with two keyboards, used for transposition.

The Flemish instruments served as the model for 18th-century harpsichord construction in other nations. In France, the double keyboards were adapted to control different choirs of strings, making a more musically flexible instrument (so-called 'expressive doubles'). Instruments from the peak of the French tradition, by makers such as the Blanchet family and Pascal Taskin, are among the most widely admired of all harpsichords, and are frequently used as models for the construction of modern instruments. In England, the Kirkman and Shudi firms produced sophisticated harpsichords of great power and sonority. German builders such as Hieronymus Albrecht Hass extended the sound repertoire of the instrument by adding sixteen-foot and two-foot choirs; instruments by the German builder Michael Mietke have recently served as models for modern builders.

Around the year 1700 the first piano was built by Bartolomeo Cristofori. In the piano, the strings are not plucked but rather are struck with hammers, which makes it possible for the player to control the volume of each note (in a harpsichord, a note sounds equally loud no matter how hard the key is pressed). With time and changes in compositional style, the expressive nuances made possible by the piano came to be increasingly valued, and by the late 18th century the piano (often called the fortepiano at that time) had largely supplanted the harpsichord. The harpsichord, now considered obsolete, almost disappeared from view for most of the 19th century. An exception was its continued use in opera for accompanying recitative, but the piano sometimes displaced it even there.

Twentieth-century efforts to revive the harpsichord began with instruments that used piano technology, with heavy strings and metal frames. Starting in the middle of the 20th century, ideas about harpsichord making underwent a major change, when builders such as Frank Hubbard, William Dowd, and Martin Skowroneck sought to re-establish the building traditions of the Baroque period. Harpsichords of this type of historically informed building practice dominate the current scene.

== Mechanism ==
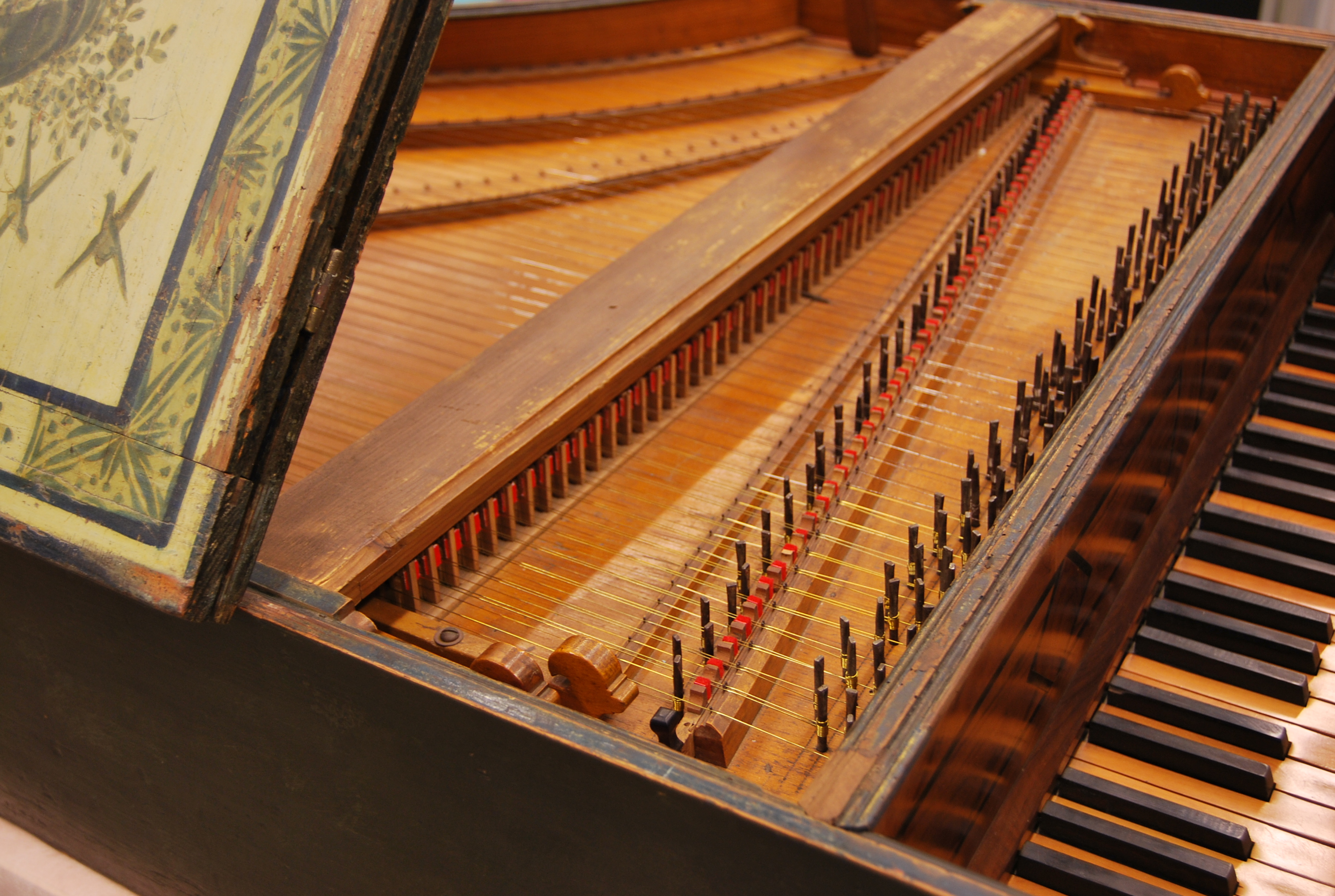
Harpsichord by Christian Zell, at Museu de la Música de Barcelona. From upper left to lower right: a bridge (supporting the far ends of the strings), the jack rail with the action (jacks) underneath, two nuts (supporting the closer ends of the strings), interleaved with two rows of tuning pins, and finally the keyboard. As with all harpsichords, the action itself is mostly hidden by the jack rail when the instrument is being played; only by removing the jack rail (or indeed, by extracting a jack) can the details of the action be observed.

Harpsichords vary in size and shape, but all have the same basic mechanism. The player depresses a key that rocks over a pivot in the middle of its length. The other end of the key lifts a jack (a long strip of wood) that holds a small plectrum (a wedge-shaped piece of quill, in modern times often made of plastic), which plucks the string. When the player releases the key, the far end returns to its rest position, and the jack falls back; the plectrum, mounted on a tongue mechanism that can swivel backwards away from the string, passes the string without plucking it again. As the key reaches its rest position, a felt damper atop the jack stops the string's vibrations. These basic principles are explained in detail below.

Figure 1: schematic view of a 2 × 8' single manual harpsichord

- The keylever is a simple pivot, which rocks on a balance pin that passes through a hole drilled through the keylever.
- The jack is a thin, rectangular piece of wood that sits upright on the end of the keylever. The jacks are held in place by the registers. These are two long strips of wood (the upper movable, the lower fixed), which run in the gap between pinblock and bellyrail. The registers have rectangular mortises (holes) through which the jacks pass as they can move up and down. The registers hold the jacks in the precise location needed to pluck the string.
  Figure 2: upper part of a jack
- In the jack, a plectrum juts out almost horizontally (normally the plectrum is angled upwards a tiny amount) and passes just under the string. Historically, plectra were made of bird quill or leather; many modern harpsichords have plastic (delrin or celcon) plectra.
- When the front of the key is pressed, the back of the key rises, the jack is lifted, and the plectrum plucks the string.
- The vertical motion of the jack is then stopped by the jackrail (also called the upper rail), which is covered with soft felt to muffle the impact.
  Figure 3: how the harpsichord action works
- When the key is released, the jack falls back down under its own weight, and the plectrum passes back under the string. This is made possible by having the plectrum held in a tongue attached with a pivot and a spring to the body of the jack. The bottom surface of the plectrum is cut at a slant; thus when the descending plectrum touches the string from above, the angled lower surface provides enough force to push the tongue backward.
- When the jack arrives in fully lowered position, the felt damper touches the string, causing the note to cease.

== Strings, tuning, and soundboard ==
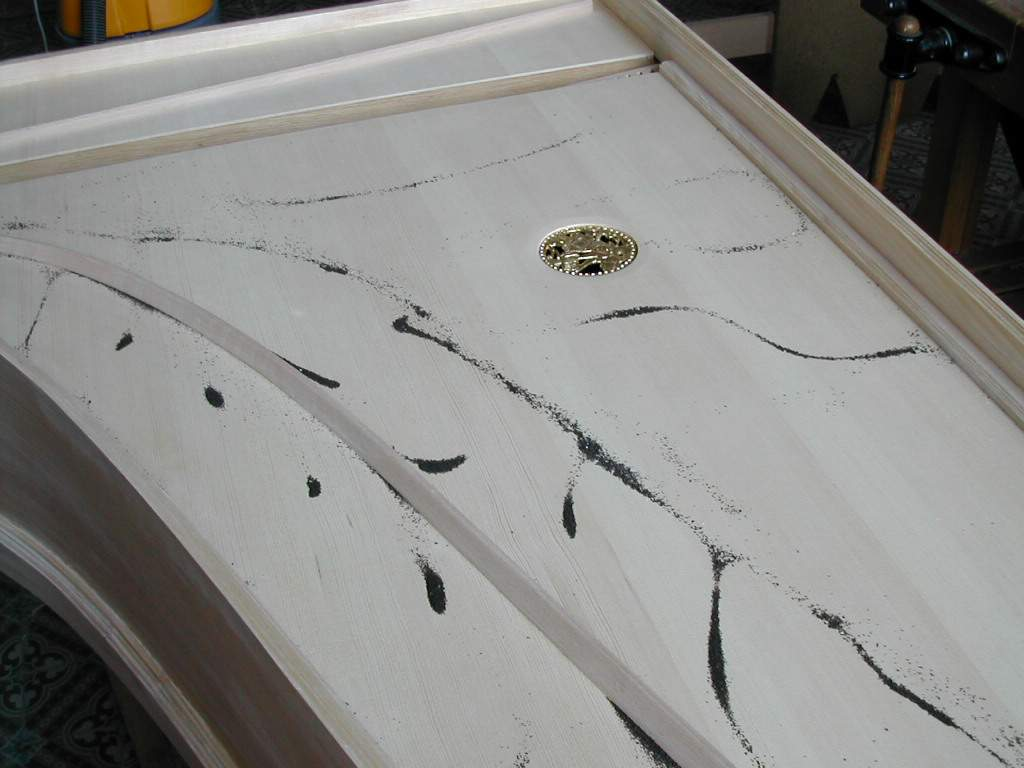
Sound board of a harpsichord with Chladni patterns

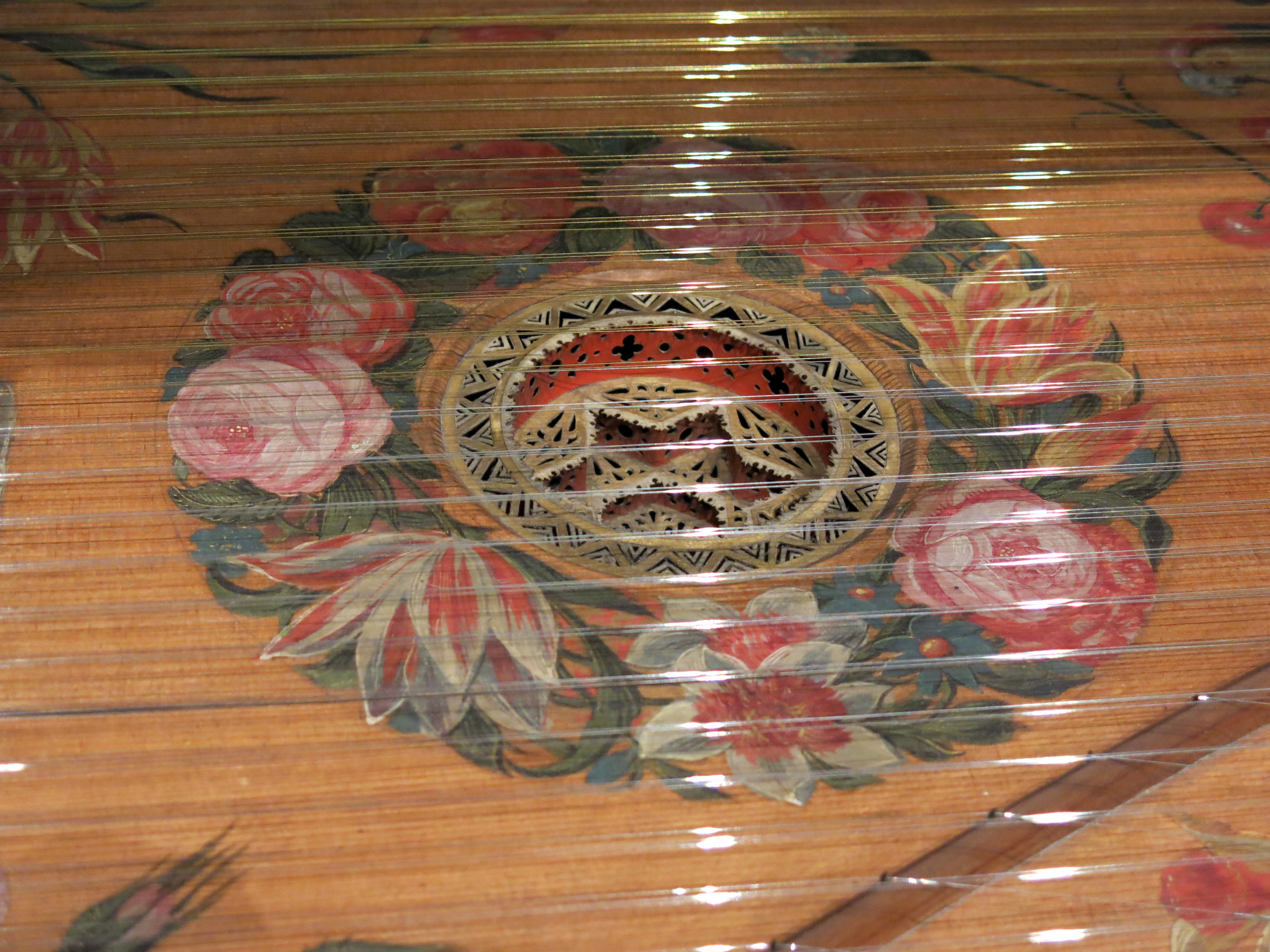
Detail of the harpsichord by Karl Conrad Fleischer; Hamburg, 1720 in Museu de la Música de Barcelona. A decorative rose descends below the soundboard in which it is mounted; the soundboard itself is adorned with floral painting around the rose. The bridge is at lower right.

Each string is wound around a tuning pin (also known as a wrest pin) at the end nearest the player. When rotated with a wrench or tuning hammer, the tuning pin adjusts the tension so that the string sounds the correct pitch. Tuning pins are held tightly in holes drilled in the pinblock or wrestplank, an oblong hardwood plank. Proceeding from the tuning pin, a string next passes over the nut, a sharp edge that is made of hardwood and is normally attached to the wrestplank. The section of the string beyond the nut forms its vibrating length, which is plucked and creates sound.

At the other end of its vibrating length, the string passes over the bridge, another sharp edge made of hardwood. As with the nut, the horizontal position of the string along the bridge is determined by a vertical metal pin inserted into the bridge, against which the string rests. The bridge itself rests on a soundboard, a thin panel of wood usually made of spruce, fir or—in some Italian harpsichords—cypress. The soundboard efficiently transmits the vibrations of the strings into vibrations in the air; without a soundboard, the strings would produce only a very feeble sound. A string is attached at its far end by a loop to a hitchpin that secures it to the case.

== Multiple manuals and choirs of strings ==
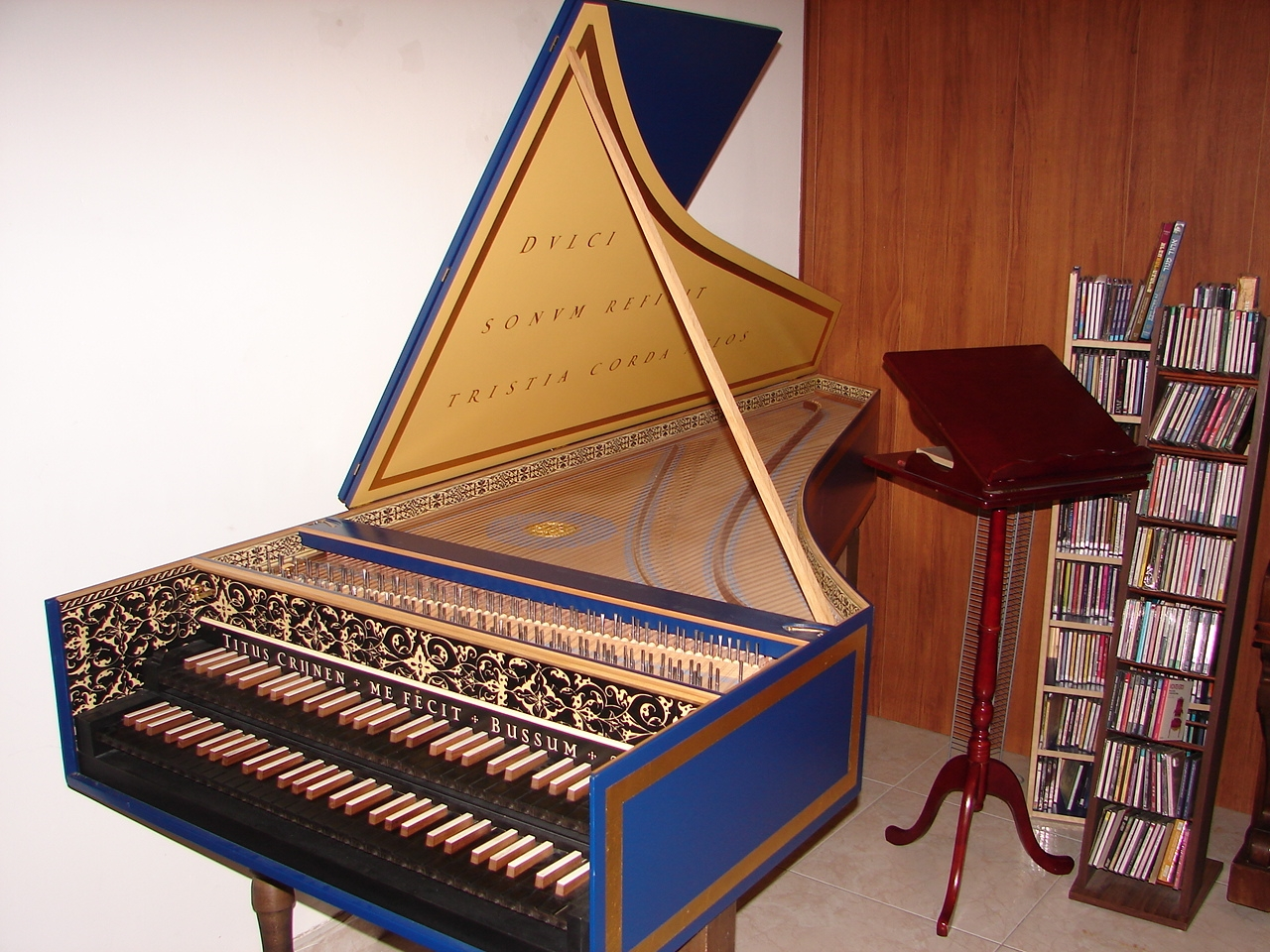
A two-manual harpsichord

While many harpsichords have one string per note, more elaborate harpsichords can have two or more. When there are multiple strings for each note, these additional strings are called "choirs" of strings. Having multiple choirs provides two advantages: the ability to vary volume and the ability to vary tonal quality. Volume is increased when the mechanism of the instrument is set up by the player (see below) so that the press of a single key plucks more than one string. Tonal quality can be varied in two ways. First, different choirs of strings can be designed to have distinct tonal qualities, usually by having one set of strings plucked closer to the nut, which emphasizes the higher harmonics, and produces a "nasal" sound quality. The mechanism of the instrument, called "stops" (following the use of the term in pipe organs), permits the player to select one choir or the other. Second, having one key pluck two strings at once changes not just volume but also tonal quality; for instance, when two strings tuned to the same pitch are plucked simultaneously, the note is not just louder but also richer and more complex.

A particularly vivid effect is obtained when the strings plucked simultaneously are an octave apart. This is normally heard by the ear not as two pitches but as one: the sound of the higher string is blended with that of the lower one, and the ear hears the lower pitch, enriched in tonal quality by the additional strength in the upper harmonics of the note sounded by the higher string.

When describing a harpsichord, it is customary to specify its choirs of strings, often called its disposition. To describe the pitch of the choirs of strings, pipe organ terminology is used. Strings at eight-foot pitch (8') sound at the normal expected pitch; strings at four-foot pitch (4') sound an octave higher. Harpsichords occasionally include a sixteen-foot (16') choir (one octave lower than eight-foot) or a two-foot (2') choir (two octaves higher; quite rare). When there are multiple choirs of strings, the player is often able to control which choirs sound. This is usually done by having a set of jacks for each choir, and a mechanism for "turning off" each set, often by moving the upper register (through which the jacks slide) sideways a short distance, so that their plectra miss the strings. In simpler instruments, this is done by manually moving the registers, but as the harpsichord evolved, builders invented levers, knee levers and pedal mechanisms to make it easier to change registration.

Harpsichords with more than one keyboard (this usually means two keyboards, stacked one on top of the other in a step-wise fashion, as with pipe organs) provide flexibility in selecting which strings play, since each manual can be set to control the plucking of a different set of strings. This means that a player can have, for instance, an 8' manual and a 4' manual ready for use, making it possible to switch between them to obtain higher (or lower) pitches or different tone. In addition, such harpsichords often have a mechanism (the "coupler") that couples manuals together, so that a single manual plays both sets of strings.

The most flexible system is the French "shove coupler", in which the lower manual slides forward and backward. In the backward position, "dogs" attached to the upper surface of the lower manual engage the lower surface of the upper manual's keys. Depending on choice of keyboard and coupler position, the player can select any of the sets of jacks labeled in "figure 4" as A, or B and C, or all three.

Figure 4. French shove coupler. To the left: uncoupled keyboards. The depressed upper key lifts the jack A upwards. The depressed lower key lifts jacks B and C. To the right: The upper keyboard is coupled to the lower one by pulling the latter. The depressed upper key lifts the jack A upwards. The depressed lower key lifts jacks A, B and C.

The English "dogleg" jack system (also used in Baroque Flanders) does not require a coupler. The jacks labeled A in Figure 5 have a "dogleg" shape that permits either keyboard to play A. If the player wishes to play the upper 8' from the upper manual only and not from the lower manual, a stop handle disengages the jacks labeled A and engages instead an alternative row of jacks called "lute stop" (not shown in the Figure). A lute stop is used to imitate the gentle sound of a plucked lute.

Figure 5. Dogleg jack, English coupler system. When depressed, the upper key lifts the "dogleg" jack (jack A) upwards. The lower key lifts all three jacks A, B, and C.

The use of multiple manuals in a harpsichord was not originally provided for the flexibility in choosing which strings would sound, but rather for transposition of the instrument to play in different keys (see History of the harpsichord).

Some early harpsichords and organs had a short octave in the lowest register. It replaced rarely used bass notes with more widely used notes.

The choice of the strings to be plucked is not the only way that sound quality can be modified. Some harpsichords may have a buff stop, which brings a strip of buff leather or other material in contact with the strings, muting their sound to simulate the sound of a plucked lute. This stop is typically controlled by an independent lever.

Some early harpsichords used a short octave for the lowest register. The rationale behind this system was that the low notes F♯ and G♯ are seldom needed in early music. Deep bass notes typically form the root of the chord, and F♯ and G♯ chords were seldom used at this time. In contrast, low C and D, both roots of very common chords, are sorely missed if a harpsichord with lowest key E is tuned to match the keyboard layout. When scholars specify the pitch range of instruments with this kind of short octave, they write "C/E", meaning that the lowest note is a C, played on a key that normally would sound E. In another arrangement, known as "G/B', the apparent lowest key B is tuned to G, and apparent C♯ and D♯ are tuned to A and B respectively.

== Case ==
The wooden case holds in position all of the important structural members: pinblock, soundboard, hitchpins, keyboard, and the jack action. It usually includes a solid bottom, and also internal bracing to maintain its form without warping under the tension of the strings. Cases vary greatly in weight and sturdiness: Italian harpsichords are often of light construction; heavier construction is found in the later Flemish instruments and those derived from them.

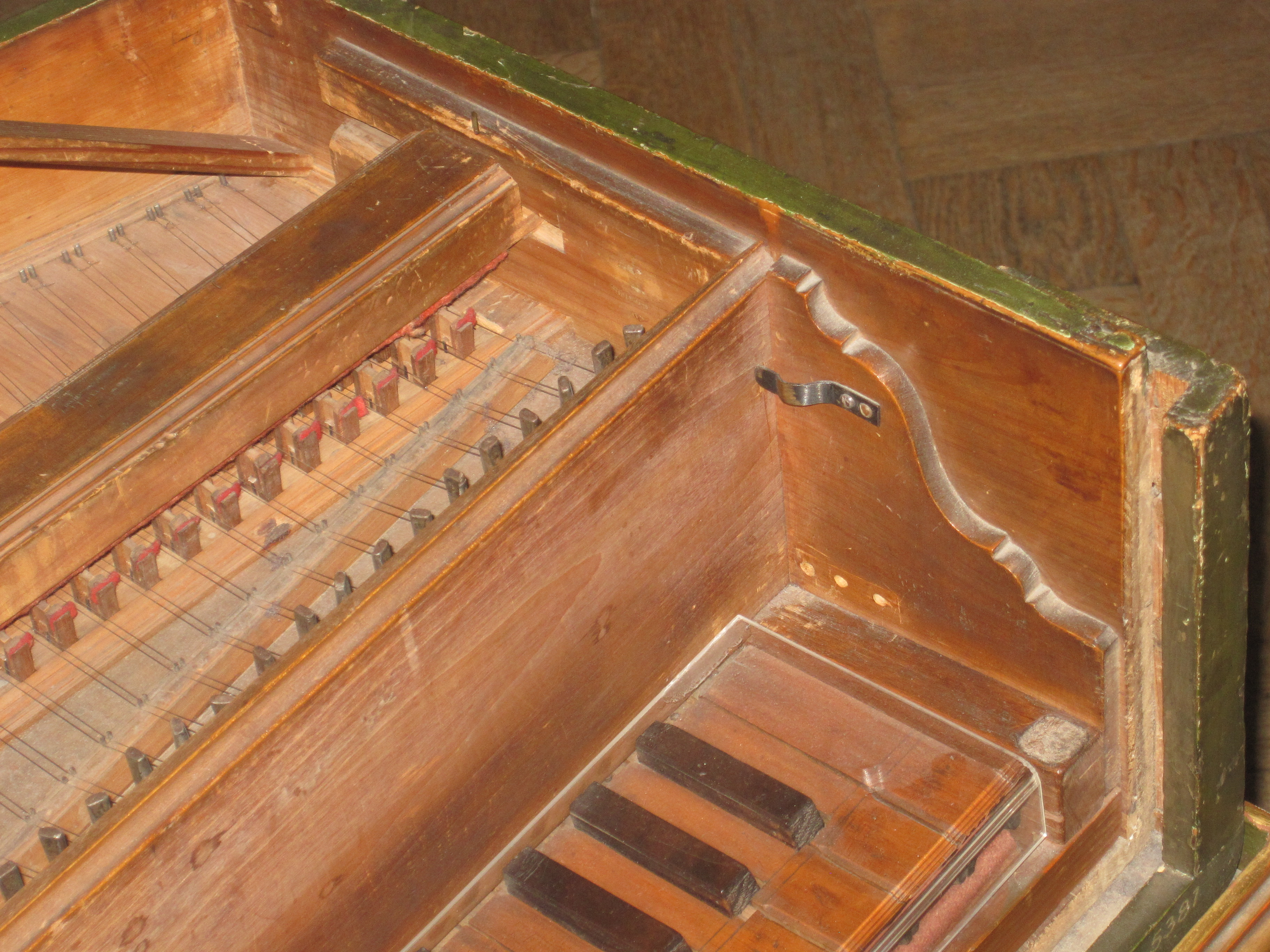
A false inner–outer harpsichord from the Deutsches Museum in Munich. The false inner case begins to the right of the keyboard, and continues backward only far enough to provide a slot to support the jack rail.

The case also gives the harpsichord its external appearance and protects the instrument. A large harpsichord is, in a sense, a piece of furniture, as it stands alone on legs and may be styled in the manner of other furniture of its place and period. Early Italian instruments, on the other hand, were so light in construction that they were treated rather like a violin: kept for storage in a protective outer case, and played after taking it out of its case and placing it on a table. Such tables were often quite high – until the late 18th century people usually played standing up. Eventually, harpsichords came to be built with just a single case, though an intermediate stage also existed: the false inner–outer, which for purely aesthetic reasons was built to look as if the outer case contained an inner one, in the old style. Even after harpsichords became self-encased objects, they often were supported by separate stands, and some modern harpsichords have separate legs for improved portability.

Harpsichords generally have a lid that can be raised, a cover for the keyboard, and a music stand for holding sheet music and scores.

Harpsichords have been decorated in a great many different ways: with plain buff paint (e.g. some Flemish instruments), with paper printed with patterns, with leather or velvet coverings, with chinoiserie, or occasionally with highly elaborate painted artwork.

== Variants ==
=== Virginals ===
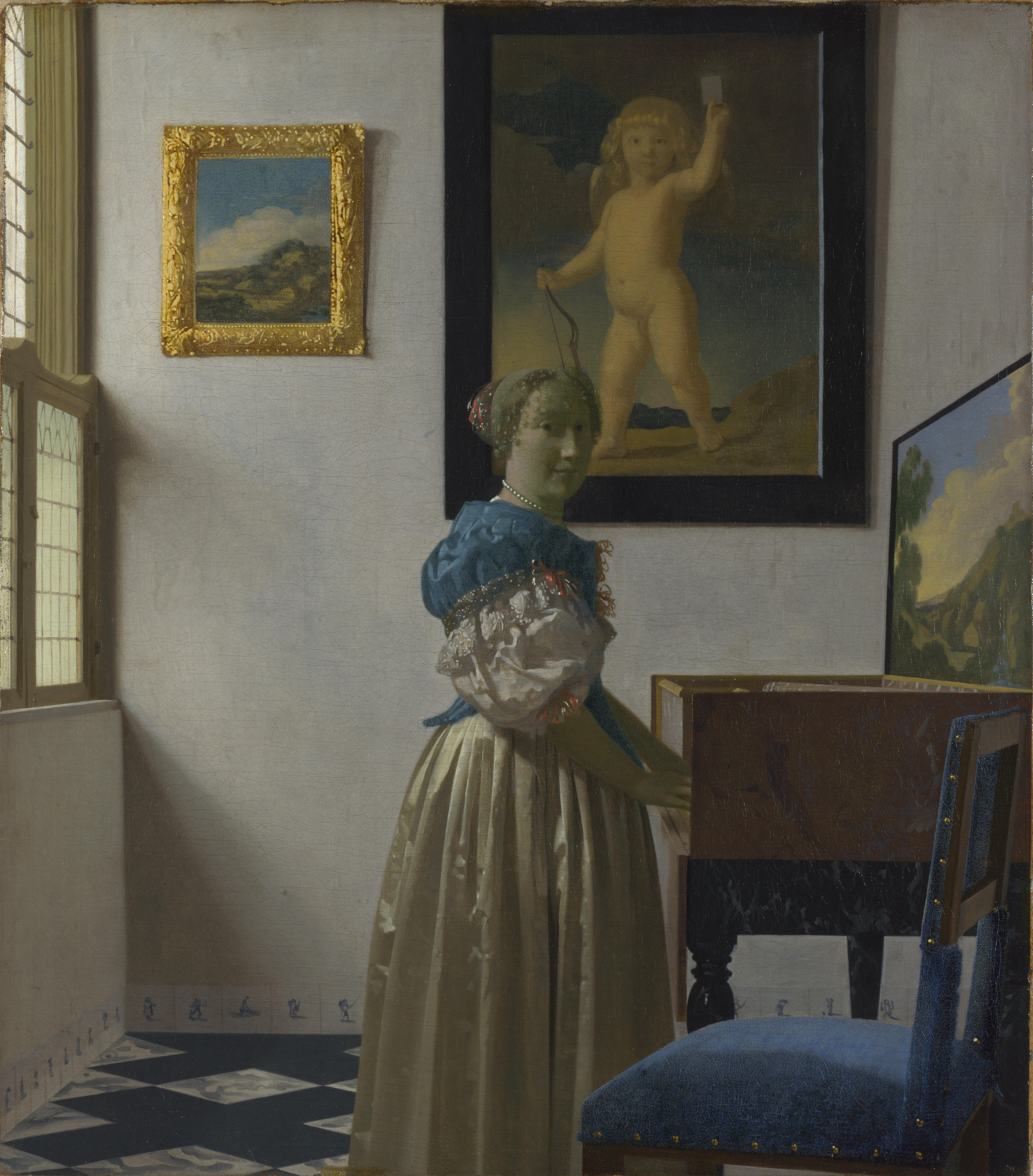
Jan Vermeer's painting Lady Standing at a Virginal shows a characteristic practice of his time, with the instrument mounted on a table and the player standing.

The virginal is a smaller and simpler rectangular form of the harpsichord having only one string per note; the strings run parallel to the keyboard, which is on the long side of the case.

=== Spinet ===
A spinet is a harpsichord with the strings set at an angle (usually about 30 degrees) to the keyboard. The strings are too close together for the jacks to fit between them. Instead, the strings are arranged in pairs, and the jacks are in the larger gaps between the pairs. The two jacks in each gap face in opposite directions, and each plucks a string adjacent to the gap.

The English diarist Samuel Pepys mentions his "tryangle" several times. This was not the percussion instrument that we call triangle today; rather, it was a name for octave-pitched spinets, which were triangular in shape.

=== Clavicytherium ===
A clavicytherium is a harpsichord with the soundboard and strings mounted vertically facing the player, the same space-saving principle as an upright piano. In a clavicytherium, the jacks move horizontally without the assistance of gravity, so that clavicytherium actions are more complex than those of other harpsichords.

An ottavino built by Arnold Dolmetsch in 1923, and modeled after a 1698 instrument by Joannes Carcassi

=== Ottavino ===
Ottavini are small spinets or virginals at four-foot pitch. Harpsichords at octave pitch were more common in the early Renaissance, but lessened in popularity later on. However, the ottavino remained very popular as a domestic instrument in Italy until the 19th century. In the Low Countries, an ottavino was commonly paired with an 8' virginals, encased in a small cubby under the soundboard of the larger instrument. The ottavino could be removed and placed on top of the virginal, making, in effect, a double manual instrument. These are sometimes called 'mother-and-child' or 'double' virginals.

=== Pedal harpsichord ===
Occasionally, harpsichords were built which included another set or sets of strings underneath and played by foot-operated pedal keyboard which trigger the plucking of the lowest-pitched keys of the harpsichord. Although there are no known extant pedal harpsichords from the 18th century or before, from Adlung (1758): the lower set of usually 8' strings "...is built like an ordinary harpsichord, but with an extent of two octaves only. The jacks are similar, but they will benefit from being arranged back to back, since the two [bass] octaves take as much space as four in an ordinary harpsichord Prior to 1980 when Keith Hill introduced his design for a pedal harpsichord, most pedal harpsichords were built based on the designs of extant pedal pianos from the 19th century, in which the instrument is as wide as the pedalboard. While these were mostly intended as practice instruments for organists, a few pieces are believed to have been written specifically for the pedal harpsichord. However, the set of pedals can augment the sound from any piece performed on the instrument, as demonstrated on several albums by E. Power Biggs.

=== Other variants ===
The archicembalo, built in the 16th century, had an unusual keyboard layout, designed to accommodate variant tuning systems demanded by compositional practice and theoretical experimentation. More common were instruments with split sharps, also designed to accommodate the tuning systems of the time.

The folding harpsichord was an instrument that could be folded up to make it more compact, thus facilitating travelling with it.

== Compass and pitch range ==
On the whole, earlier harpsichords have smaller ranges than later ones, although there are many exceptions. The largest harpsichords have a range of just over five octaves, and the smallest have under four. Usually, the shortest keyboards were given extended range in the bass with a "short octave". The traditional pitch range for a 5-octave instrument is F_{1}–F_{6} (FF–f‴).

Tuning pitch is often taken to be A_{4} = 415 Hz, roughly a semitone lower than the modern standard concert pitch of A_{4} = 440 Hz. An accepted exception is for French baroque repertoire, which is often performed with a = 392 Hz, approximately a semitone lower again. See Jean-Philippe Rameau's Treatise on Harmony (1722) [Dover Publications], Book One, chapter five, for insight into French baroque tuning; "Since most of these semitones are absolutely necessary in the tuning of organs and other similar instruments, the following chromatic system has been drawn up." Tuning an instrument nowadays usually starts with setting an A; historically it would commence from a C or an F. The harpsichord uses the bass clef (F clef).

Some modern instruments are built with keyboards that can shift sideways, allowing the player to align the mechanism with strings at either A = 415 Hz or A = 440 Hz. If a tuning other than equal temperament is used, the instrument requires retuning once the keyboard is shifted.

== Decoration ==
Throughout the historical period, the harpsichord was characteristically decorated; for extensive discussion and illustration see Kottick (2003). Cases were painted in bright colors (especially in 18th century France), or covered with elaborate wood veneer (18th century England), or adorned with sculptural moldings and knobs (Italy). Soundboards bore paintings, either of individual items such as flowers and animals (Flanders, also France), or even (in expensive instruments), full-scale paintings of the kind usually executed on canvas. Keyboards could have the same "white keys" and "black keys" that pianos have today, but builders frequently employed the opposite pattern, with white sharps and black naturals. The study of harpsichord decoration became an important scholarly field in the 20th century, notably with the work of Sheridan Germann (2002), whose knowledge extended to the point of being able to pin down the particular anonymous artists who worked with particular builders.

== Music ==
Bach's Little Prelude in C major being played on a harpsichord

The great bulk of the standard repertoire for the harpsichord was written during its first historical flowering, the Renaissance and Baroque eras.

=== Renaissance ===
The first music written specifically for solo harpsichord was published around the early 16th century. Composers who wrote solo harpsichord music were numerous during the whole Baroque era in European countries including Italy, Germany, England and France. Solo harpsichord compositions included dance suites, fantasias, and fugues. Among the most famous composers who wrote for the harpsichord were the members of English virginal school of the late Renaissance, notably William Byrd (c. 1540–1623).

=== Baroque era ===
In France, a great number of highly characteristic solo works were created and compiled into four books of ordres by François Couperin (1668–1733). Domenico Scarlatti (1685–1757) began his career in Italy but wrote most of his solo harpsichord works in Spain; his most famous work is his series of 555 harpsichord sonatas. Perhaps the most celebrated composers who wrote for the harpsichord were Georg Friedrich Händel (1685–1759), who composed numerous suites for harpsichord, and especially J. S. Bach (1685–1750), whose solo works (for instance, The Well-Tempered Clavier and the Goldberg Variations), continue to be performed very widely, often on the piano. Bach was also a pioneer of the harpsichord concerto, both in works designated as such, and in the harpsichord part of his Fifth Brandenburg Concerto.

=== Classical period ===
Two of the most prominent composers of the Classical era, Joseph Haydn (1732–1809) and Wolfgang Amadeus Mozart (1756–1791), wrote harpsichord music. For both, the instrument featured in the earlier period of their careers, and was largely supplanted by the piano starting roughly in the late 1770s.

=== Music of the harpsichord revival ===
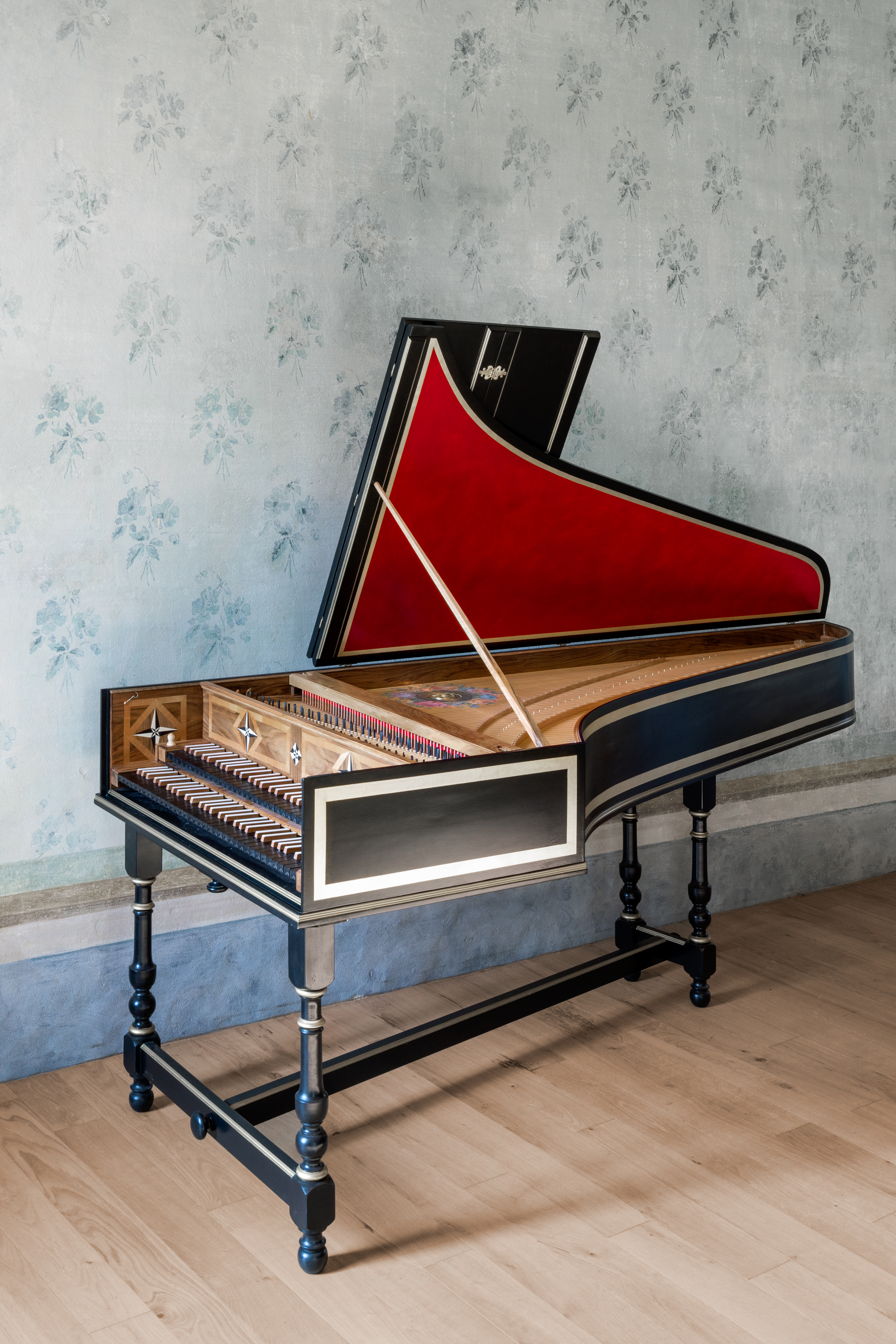
Modern harpsichord (Alberto Colzani, 2021). Like most modern harpsichords, it is built on historical principles, and indeed is directly modeled on an 18th century instrument by Christian Zelle.

Through the 19th century, the harpsichord was almost completely supplanted by the piano. In the 20th century, composers returned to the instrument, as they sought out variation in the sounds available to them. Under the influence of Arnold Dolmetsch, the harpsichordists Violet Gordon-Woodhouse (1872–1951) and in France, Wanda Landowska (1879–1959), were at the forefront of the instrument's renaissance. Concertos for the instrument were written by Francis Poulenc (the Concert champêtre, 1927–28), and Manuel de Falla. Elliott Carter's Double Concerto is scored for harpsichord, piano and two chamber orchestras. For a detailed account of music composed for the revived harpsichord, see Contemporary harpsichord.

== See also ==
- Clavichord
- List of historical harpsichord makers
- List of keyboard instruments
- List of harpsichordists
- Harpsichordist

== Sources ==
- Boalch-Mould Online A searchable database of 2000+ harpsichord and clavichord makers, 2500 instruments, and 4300 instrument photos.
- Dearling, Robert, ed. (1996). The Ultimate Encyclopedia of Musical Instruments. London: Carlton. ISBN 978-1-85868-185-6.
- Hubbard, Frank (1967). Three Centuries of Harpsichord Making (2 ed.). Harvard University Press. ISBN 978-0-674-88845-6. An authoritative survey by a leading builder of how early harpsichords were built and how the harpsichord evolved over time in different national traditions.
- Kottick, Edward (1987). The Harpsichord Owner's Guide. Chapel Hill: University of North Carolina Press.
- Kottick, Edward (2003). A History of the Harpsichord. Indiana University Press. ISBN 0-253-34166-3. An extensive survey by a leading contemporary scholar.
- Russell, Raymond (1973). The Harpsichord and Clavichord: an introductory study (2nd ed.). London: Faber and Faber. ISBN 0-571-04795-5.
