= List of historical harpsichord makers =

This page presents a graphical timelines, listing historical makers of the harpsichord and related instruments such as the virginal, spinet and clavicytherium. The makers are grouped according to which regional building tradition they belong.

== Graphical timeline overview ==
Below is an overview of arguably the most important harpsichord makers whose names are known today, but the list is by no means exhaustive. Some of those listed were founders and members of influential harpsichord building dynasties. Others are known only through one or two instruments that have serendipitously survived, but are included because these instruments have proven a popular inspiration to modern builders who copy them. Some of the makers who started the historically informed harpsichord revival are also included.

=== Notes on overview ===
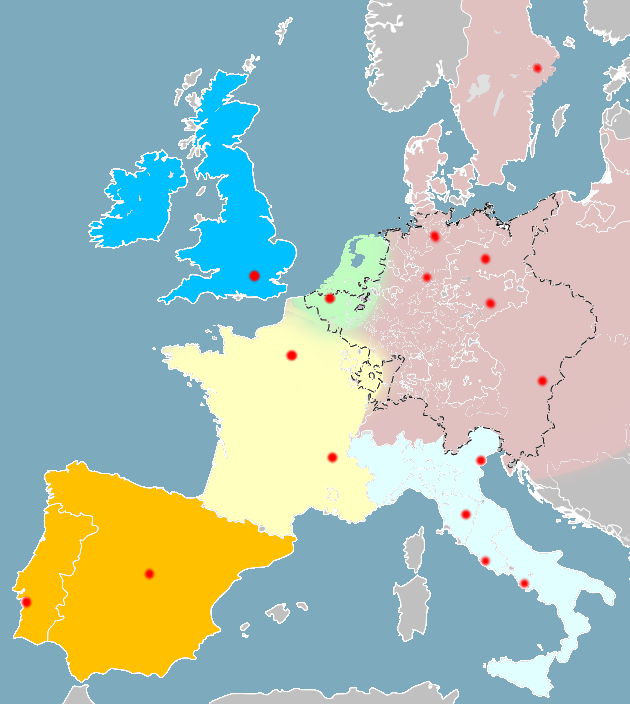
This image divides 18th-century western Europe according to regional harpsichord building traditions: Green: Flemish. Yellow: French. Light blue: Italian. Red: German. Dark blue: English. Orange: Iberian.

- Makers whose dates of birth or death are unknown are marked with an asterisk (*). In such cases, the time period indicated by the graphic is demarcated by the earliest or latest reference found to the maker. In many cases these are dates of the youngest or oldest dated instruments by said maker.
- Note that the piano rapidly became popular at the end of the 18th century, and many builders at the time built both instruments, until the harpsichord effectively became extinct early in the 19th century.
- The top line shows composers from each era for orientation. All of these composers, except Schubert and Brahms in the nineteenth century, composed for the harpsichord.
- At the bottom of the chart are listed events that affect the harpsichord in some way, or give historical context.

== Italian makers ==
A more detailed list of historical Italian harpsichord makers.

- Makers whose dates of birth or death are unknown are marked with an asterisk (*). In such cases, the time period indicated by the graphic is demarcated by the earliest or latest reference found to the maker. In many cases these are dates of the youngest or oldest dated instruments by said maker.

== Flemish makers ==
A more detailed timeline of Flemish harpsichord makers, including notable Flemish émigrés to other regions.

- Makers whose dates of birth or death are unknown are marked with an asterisk (*). In such cases, the time period indicated by the graphic is demarcated by the earliest or latest reference found to the maker. In many cases these are dates of the youngest or oldest dated instruments by said maker.
- Makers where only the date of birth is known are marked with a double asterisk (**).
- Notable Flemish-born makers that emigrated to other regions, are listed under the building tradition in which they belonged.

== German makers ==
A more detailed list of historical German harpsichord makers, including a number of notable German émigrés to other regions.

- Makers whose dates of birth or death are unknown are marked with an asterisk (*). In such cases, the time period indicated by the graphic is demarcated by the earliest or latest reference found to the maker. In many cases these are dates of the youngest or oldest dated instruments by said maker.
- Notable makers born in German speaking states who emigrated to other countries are included here, but listed under the color of the building tradition in which they made their name.
- Harpsichord building was often considered a lesser side job for organ builders, while some few were specialized in either harpsichord or clavichord building.
- Note that in the German speaking world the harpsichord was only one of several instruments referred to as clavier, and keyboard instruments seem to have been used more indiscriminately there than in other regions. It is not surprising that, although invented in Italy, the piano first became popular in the German states and Austria, added to the plethora of 'clavier' instruments.

== See also ==
- Clavicymbalum
- Clavicytherium
- Folding harpsichord
- History of the harpsichord
- Spinet
- Virginals

== Sources ==
- Makers of the Harpsichord and Clavichord, 1480 to 1840, Donald Boalch, 1995, 3. ed, Oxford University Press
- History of the harpsichord, Edward L. Kottick, 2003, 1.ed., Indiana University Press
- Ruckers A harpsichord building tradition, Grant O´Brien, 1990, 1. ed., Cambridge University Press
- A Performer's Guide to Renaissance Music, Jeffery T. Kite-Powell, 2007, Indiana University Press
