= Oval spinet =

17th-century keyboard instrument

The oval spinet is a type of harpsichord invented in the late 17th century by Bartolomeo Cristofori, the Italian instrument maker who later achieved fame for inventing the piano. The oval spinet was unusual for its shape, the arrangement of its strings, and for its mechanism for changing registration.

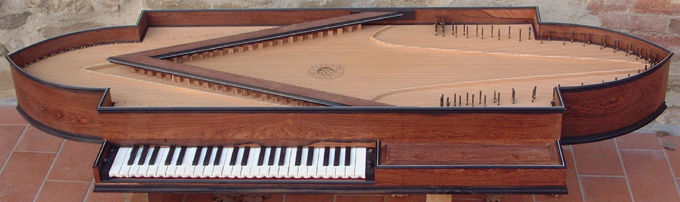
Facsimile of 1690 oval spinet by Tony Chinnery and Kerstin Schwarz

The two oval spinets built by Cristofori survive today. One, built in 1690, is kept in the Museo degli strumenti musicali, part of the Galleria del Accademia in Florence. The other, from 1693, is in the Museum für Musikinstrumente of the University of Leipzig. Cristofori built the two oval spinets for the Medici family of Florence. His patron, Prince Ferdinando, needed a compact instrument with multiple string choirs for a small theatre.

== Design ==
=== String layout ===
In the oval spinet, the strings were placed parallel to the keyboard, the same arrangement as in a virginals. This can be seen in the following schematic false-color diagram of the 1690 oval spinet, showing the outline, keyboard, bridges, and string arrangement. The diagram and those that follow are colorizations of an original by Tony Chinnery.

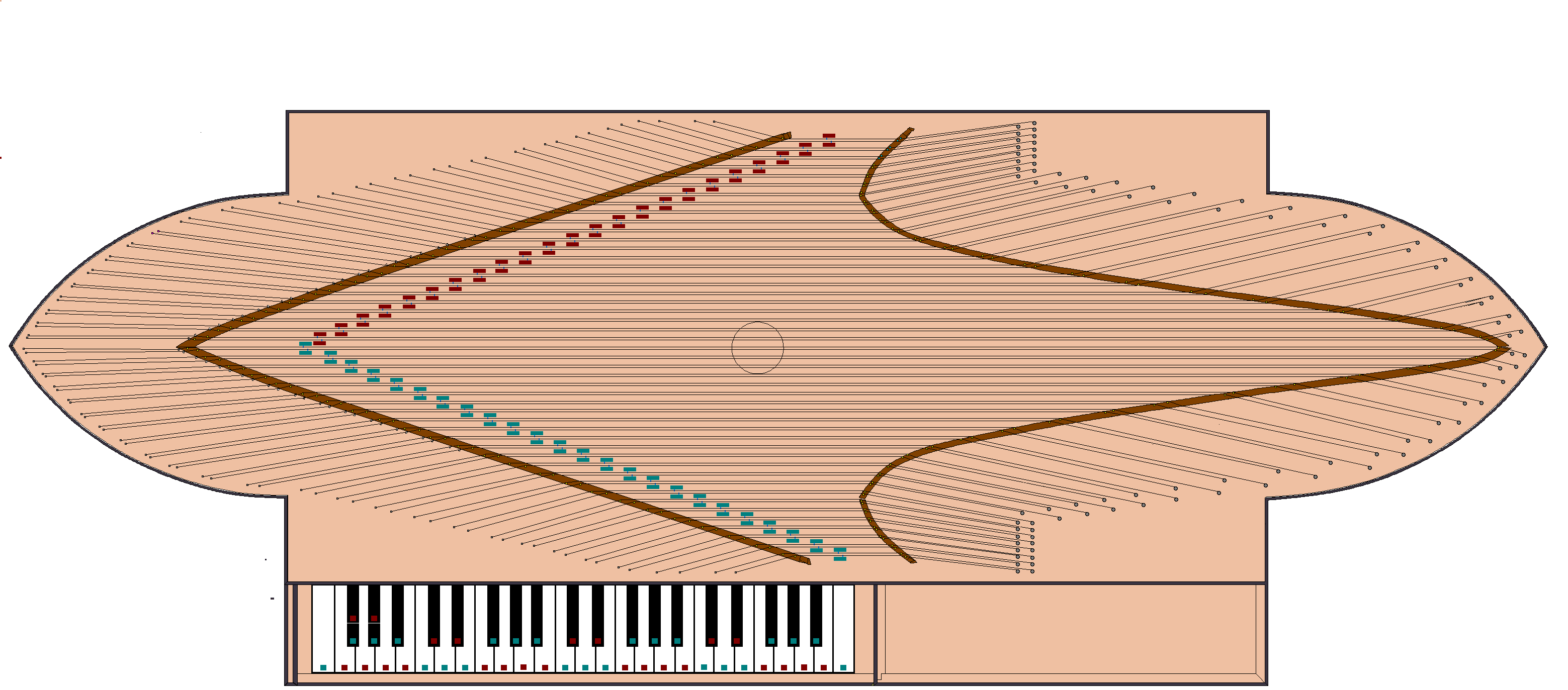
The layout of the 1690 oval spinet. The colors of the dots superimposed on the keyboard match the corresponding jack slots. For a detailed version of this image, click on it and follow links.

Unlike in a virginals, the longest strings in an oval spinet are placed in the middle. The strings are arranged so the pair of strings that sounded the lowest note (C) are precisely in the middle, the next lowest pair (C#) is just behind the lowest pair, the third lowest pair (D) just in front of the lowest pair, and so on. Because of the alternating pattern, the highest two notes are the frontmost and hindmost string pairs, thus the farthest apart. By placing the strings in this way, the oval spinet has a (very roughly) oval shape; hence its name.

=== Arrangement of jacks and keyboard ===
As in all harpsichords, the strings in the oval spinet are plucked by plectra suspended in jacks, thin vertical strips of wood. Each jack rises from the far end of its key, passes through a guiding register in the soundboard, and terminates adjacent to its assigned string, close enough for the bit of quill held by the jack - the plectrum - to pluck the string. In the diagram above, keys labeled with aqua dots lift the jacks that pass through the slots shown in aqua, and keys labeled in maroon control jacks passing through slots labeled with the same color.

This arrangement is feasible because the keys are of alternating lengths. These are shown in the following diagram of the keyboard, which rests in the lower part of the case, mostly obscured by the soundboard. The keys are color-coded in the same way as in the first diagram. The same color-coding appears at the far end of each key, schematically indicating the portion of the key that engages the lower end of the jacks.

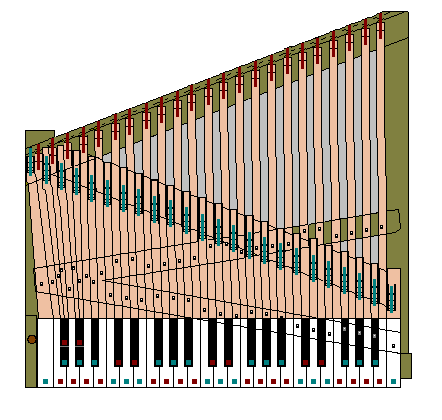

As can be seen, underneath the keys are two balance rails, one for the keys that play the front row of jacks, the other for the keys that play the rear row.

=== Advantages of the design ===
Cristofori's design permits a structurally very stable instrument. In a normal harpsichord, the far ends of the strings pull on the bentside (the long, curved, slanting side of the case, at the player's right). For reasons having to do with the string lengths, the curve of the bentside must be concave, making it naturally weak. In contrast, in an oval spinet the strings pull at either end on a convex arch, an inherently very strong configuration.

Maintaining the integrity of the case was evidently important to Cristofori. Later on, in his (standardly-shaped) pianos and harpsichords, he employed two separate bent sides, one to support the soundboard and the other to bear the tension of the strings. This protected the soundboard from possible warping should the outer bentside be pulled out of position.

A second advantage of Cristofori's oval spinet design is that it allows for a more compact instrument. When the strings of a keyboard instrument are laid out in the simplest way (ascending in pitch from left to right, as in full-size harpsichords), the resulting triangular shape is space-consuming and inefficient. The spinet harpsichord, which saves space by arranging the strings in slanted pairs, is still much longer than it is wide. Virginals, which enclose their triangle of strings in a rectangular box, have a great deal of unused space. In comparison with these designs, Cristofori's quasi-oval layout stands out for its compactness and efficiency.

=== Changing registration ===
Cristofori's oval spinets have two choirs of strings, each at 8-foot (normal) pitch. In the pairs of strings seen in the diagram above, each pair consists of one string from each choir. The purpose of having two choirs was evidently twofold. First, when both strings are played at once, a louder sound is obtained. Second, the two choirs of strings have different timbres, so contrasting tone qualities can be obtained by selecting just one choir.

The contrasting timbres result from two factors. Owing to the slant of the bridges, in each pair the string closer to the outer edge of the case is shorter. Moreover, it is plucked relatively closer to the bridge, which emphasizes higher harmonics. Cristofori enhanced the difference in plucking points by placing the plectra on opposite sides of the jack in the two choirs, as seen in the detail figure below.

In playing the oval spinet, the player selects a registration; that is, the particular choirs (longer strings, shorter strings, or both together) that will be sounded when a key is depressed. Cristofori accomplished this end with an ingenious mechanical arrangement.

For the keys that play the near row of jacks (closer to the player), the mechanism works like this. The portion of the key that engages the lower end of the jack is U-shaped, with each prong of the U ending in a wide, flat upper surface. (This U-shaped part is shown in blue in the false-color diagrams below.) The entire keyboard mechanism can be slightly shifted toward or away from the player, using knobs at the sides of the keyboard. Depending on the location of the keyboard, the jacks will be aligned in different ways against the U, resulting in different strings being played. The three possibilities are shown in the diagrams below, which depict sounding jacks in green, silent ones in red.

When the keyboard is fully extracted (pulled toward the player), the jack closer to the player is aligned with the slot of the U, so that only the string plucked by the jack farther than the player (the longer string) will sound.

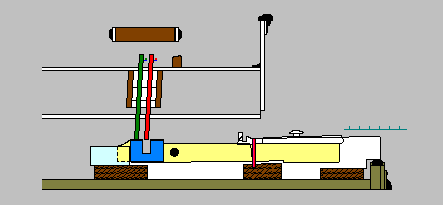

When the keyboard is in an intermediate position, neither jack will align with the U-slot, and both sets of strings will sound.

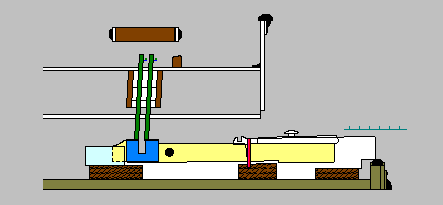

Lastly, when the keyboard is fully inserted (pushed away from the player), the far jack aligns with the slot, and only the string plucked by the near jack (the shorter string) will sound.

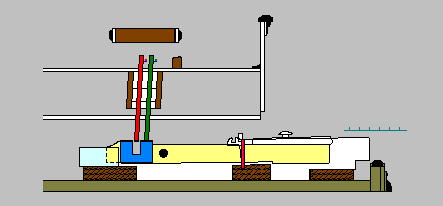

A separate device prevents any jacks aligned above the slot from actually sinking into it.

The mechanism just described is used only for the near row of jacks. In the far row, a simpler, mirror-image scheme is used: a single block of wood engages the jacks. It is just wide enough to raise both if the keyboard is in the intermediate position, but will engage only the front jack (longer string) if the keyboard is fully extracted, and only the rear jack (shorter string) if the keyboard is fully inserted.

The result is that when the keyboard is fully extracted, all of the inner jacks on the instrument are engaged, playing all of the longer strings, and when the keyboard is fully inserted, all of the outer jacks are engaged, playing all of the shorter strings. The intermediate position plays all the strings.

=== Split keys ===
The lowest F# and G# on the keyboard of the 1690 oval spinet are split. The purpose was to include the low notes C and D in a compact keyboard. A rather complex arrangement of key levers (see keyboard diagram above) permits both halves of the split keys to control their own jacks.

The assignment of keys to pitches is the broken octave, which was a system of pitch assignment used in early keyboard instruments. The following diagram shows the assignment of pitches to the bottom eight notes of the keyboard:

The somewhat cumbersome scheme is less awkward than it might initially seem, since it would have been troublesome only in rapid chromatic passages, which seldom occur in this pitch range. The other surviving oval spinet by Cristofori, from 1693, has no split keys, but implements the same range (four octaves, C to c''') using a normal keyboard.

=== Layout of the arches ===

The two elegant sections that resemble Gothic arches at either end of the instrument are made of circular arcs. The musical instrument builder and scholar Grant O'Brien investigated their design. Cristofori first drew a line exactly 13 Florentine soldi long (a soldo was, at the time, 27.56 mm) to serve as the base of the arch. Then, he extended this line by one soldo in either direction, and made marks one soldo beyond the base line. He then centered a compass or string on these marks and laid out the circular form of the arches with a radius of 14 soldi. This construction was the traditional method for obtaining the form of Gothic arches; see Ogive.

=== String lengths and plucking points ===
The strings and plucking points of the 1690 oval spinet, as measured by Tony Chinnery, are in striking agreement with the same measurements from two regular harpsichords built by Cristofori decades later, in 1722 and 1726. The following chart shows the lengths of the longer set of strings:

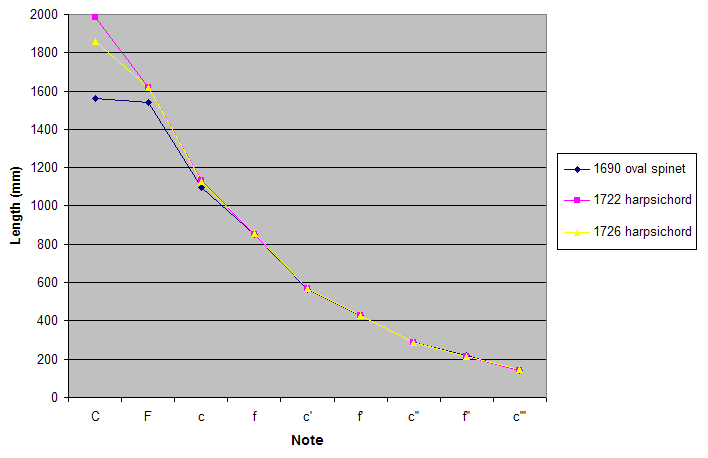

The string lengths of the 1690 instrument are similar to later harpsichords, except for the lowest bass strings, where the length of the instrument doesn't match. The same is true of the plucking points, calculated as percentages of the string length for the longer choirs of strings:

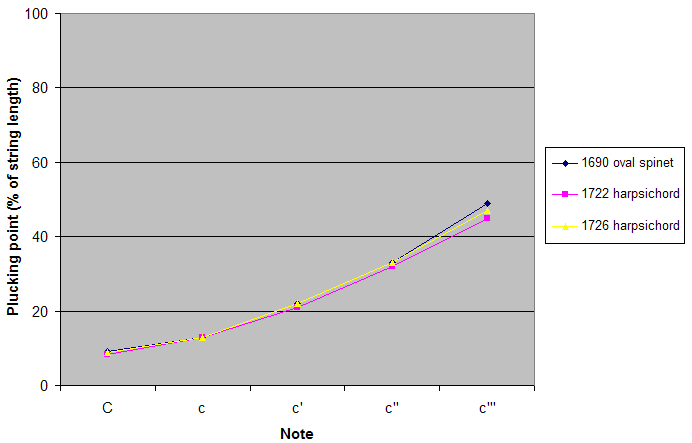

All this suggests that Cristofori, despite a penchant for innovation, was conservative in string scaling. The consistency of the measurements also illustrates the meticulous care Cristofori took to lay out his instruments.

== History ==
Cristofori built the two oval spinets for the Medici family of Florence. Cristofori's patron was Prince Ferdinando, the son of Grand Duke Cosimo III and heir to the Tuscan throne. Prince Ferdinando, a great opera enthusiast, organized many operatic productions at the Medici villa at Pratolino. According to William Holmes (references below), the prince often participated as the continuo player, seated at a harpsichord among the orchestral musicians. The theatre the Prince had available at Pratolino was small, so the prince had a strong incentive for a compact instrument that could fit in the orchestra, but had multiple string choirs to provide volume. The oval spinets may have been Cristofori's effort to fulfill this requirement (and not the only such effort—see below).

The two oval spinets are luxury items—the novel product of a skilled craftsman—which alone would have made them expensive. Moreover, they are enclosed in fine cabinetry made from costly woods. Bills that Cristofori submitted to his employers indicate that the cabinetry is the work of a different craftsman, subcontracting for Cristofori. The cabinet maker probably also produced outer cases to enclose the instruments—but, if so, these are now lost.

The two oval spinets both appear in a 1700 inventory of Prince Ferdinando's musical instrument collection. This inventory is better known today as the first written evidence for the existence of Cristofori's newly invented piano. The next Medici instrument inventory, evidently made by Cristofori himself, dates from 1716, three years after Prince Ferdinando's death. The oval spinets do not appear in this inventory, and evidently had been disposed of (through gift or sale).

In 1726, long after the two original spinets were built, but still in Cristofori's lifetime, the Bolognese builder Giuseppe Maria Goccini (1675-post 1733) built an instrument on similar principles, with the longest strings in the middle, alternating key lengths, and the ability to change stops by sliding the keyboard. However, Goccini's instrument was octagonal (a rectangle with truncated corners) rather than rectangular with appended arches. It is not known whether this instrument was inspired by Cristofori's or was an independent invention.

=== Reception ===
Musical instrument scholar Stewart Pollens called the oval spinet "a tour de force of mechanical design, fully the product of Cristofori's inventive character." Yet aside from the possible example by Goccini, the oval spinet did not catch on in Cristofori's day.

As noted above, the impetus for the oval spinet may have been Prince Ferdinando's wish for a compact multi-choired harpsichord suited to the orchestra pit. It may be that the Prince was not satisfied with Cristofori's first efforts in this area, because later on in the 1690s, Cristofori created a different design, his spinettone ("large spinet"), which deployed multiple string choirs at an angle to the keyboard, following the basic principle of the spinet. It may be that Ferdinando thought the spinettone a better solution to the problem of making a small but audible continuo instrument than the oval spinet.

Evidence Giuliana Montanari gathered from the Medici records supports this conclusion. While Cristofori's spinettoni were constantly loaned out from the Medici collection for use, this is not so for the oval spinets, which according to Montanari "remained in the same places, gradually deteriorating." Given that the oval spinet failed to achieve popularity at the Medici court, it is unlikely it would have been adopted in society at large, given the expense of building it and the conservatism of the instrument-makers' guilds of the time.

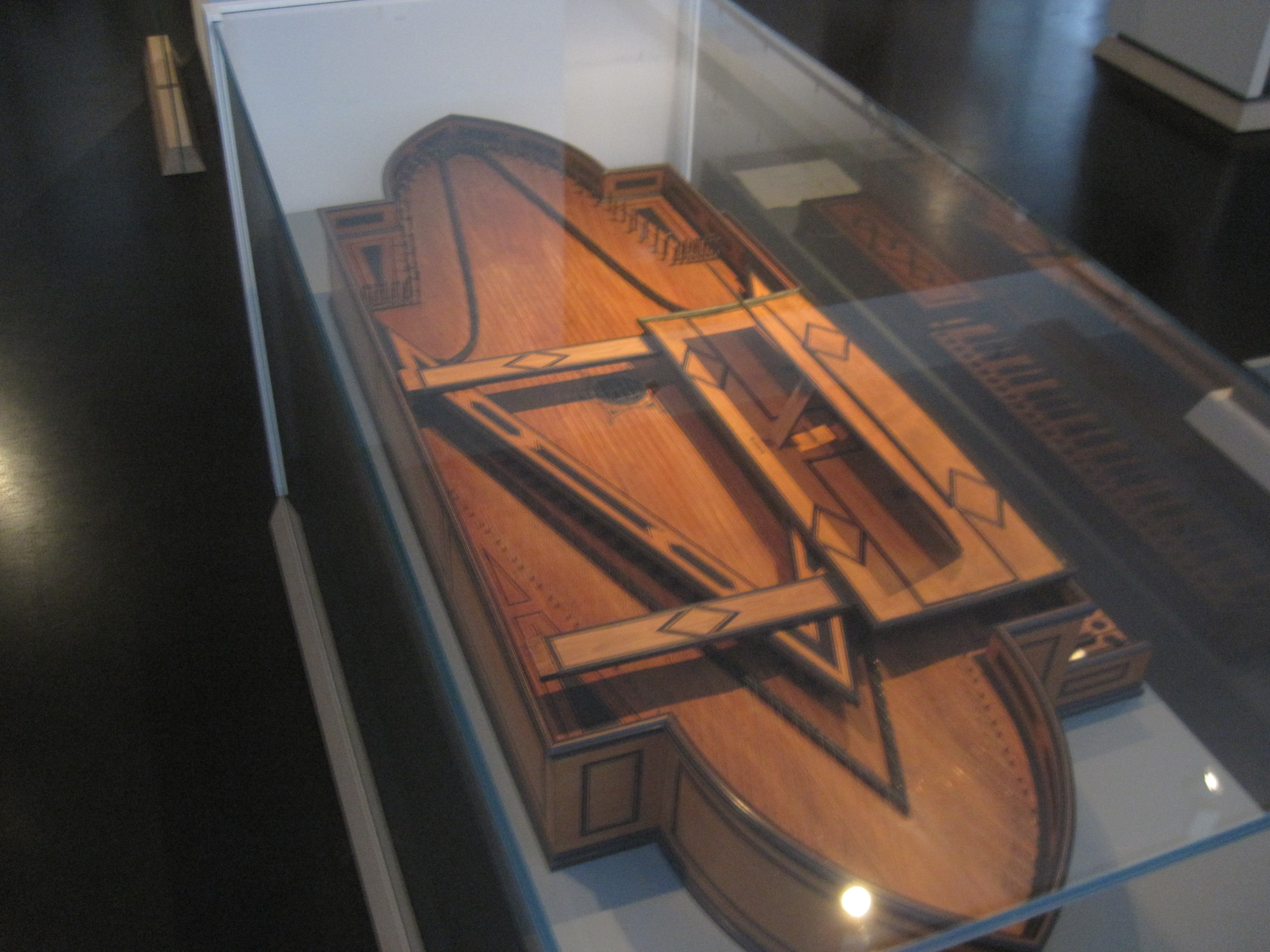
The 1693 oval spinet, in the collections of the Museum für Musikinstrumente in Leipzig, Germany

== The spinets today ==
The two spinets, though similar in design, are very different in their current state. The oval spinet of 1693, now in the Museum für Musikinstrumente of the University of Leipzig, has been restored. The instrument is physically attractive, but because the restoration process obliterated information about the earlier state of the instrument, this spinet has diminished historical value for understanding Cristofori's work.

The other surviving oval spinet was discovered only in the year 2000, having sat unnoticed in storage for a great period of time in the vast collections of Stefano Bardini, an antique dealer around the turn of the 20th century. The long period when the instrument sat unnoticed was due in part to delays in the transfer of the Bardini collection from his heirs to public ownership. The instrument was noticed when the collection was finally acquired by the Italian state and submitted to a systematic inventory. It is unknown how the spinet made its way into Bardini's hands.

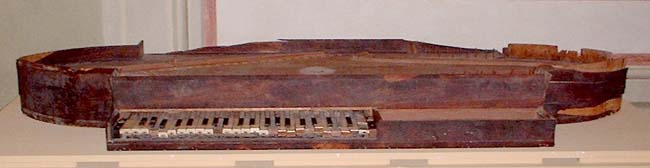

The 1690 instrument (shown above) has an outwardly decrepit appearance, but is of great historical value, for it appears that in all of the three centuries of its existence it has never been restored.

=== Research on the rediscovered 1690 oval spinet ===
The historical importance of the 1690 instrument was immediately recognized, and a team of experts assembled to study it with technology specially designed to keep the instrument intact. The equipment and techniques employed included a frame-mounted laser pointer device (to establish dimensions without any need to touch the instrument), X-rays (to detect case-internal parts), optical microscopy (identification of wood species), electron microscopy (for wire and pin composition), and infrared spectrophotometry (to identify glue).

To preserve the instrument's historical value, Italian authorities placed it on display unchanged in the Museo degli Strumenti Musicali in the Galleria del Accademia. To give a sense of what the instrument was like when it was new, they commissioned harpsichord builders Tony Chinnery and Kerstin Schwarz to build a modern copy (pictured above), which the museum displays alongside the original.

== Nomenclature ==
As Grant O'Brien (see links below) has observed, the oval spinet is, technically, not a spinet. "Spinet" designates a kind of harpsichord with strings at an angle to the keyboard. Since the oval spinet places its strings parallel to the keyboard, it is more properly called a virginal. The term "oval spinet" is used simply because it is the most convenient English rendering of Cristofori's own Italian term, spinetta ovale. Evidently, 17th-century Italian used the term spinetta more loosely than 21st-century English uses "spinet".
