= Zenti =

Zenti may refer to:

- Zenti (river), in the Basketo special woreda of Ethiopia
- Girolamo Zenti (c. 1609 – c. 1666), Italian harpsichord maker
- Giuseppe Zenti (b. 1947), Catholic bishop

== See also ==
- Centi-
