= Gravicembalo =

Gravicembalo may refer to:

- The harpsichord (a corruption of the Italian term clavicembalo)
- The piano (originally called gravicembalo col piano e forte by its inventor, Bartolomeo Cristofori)
