= Spinettone =

17th-century musical instrument

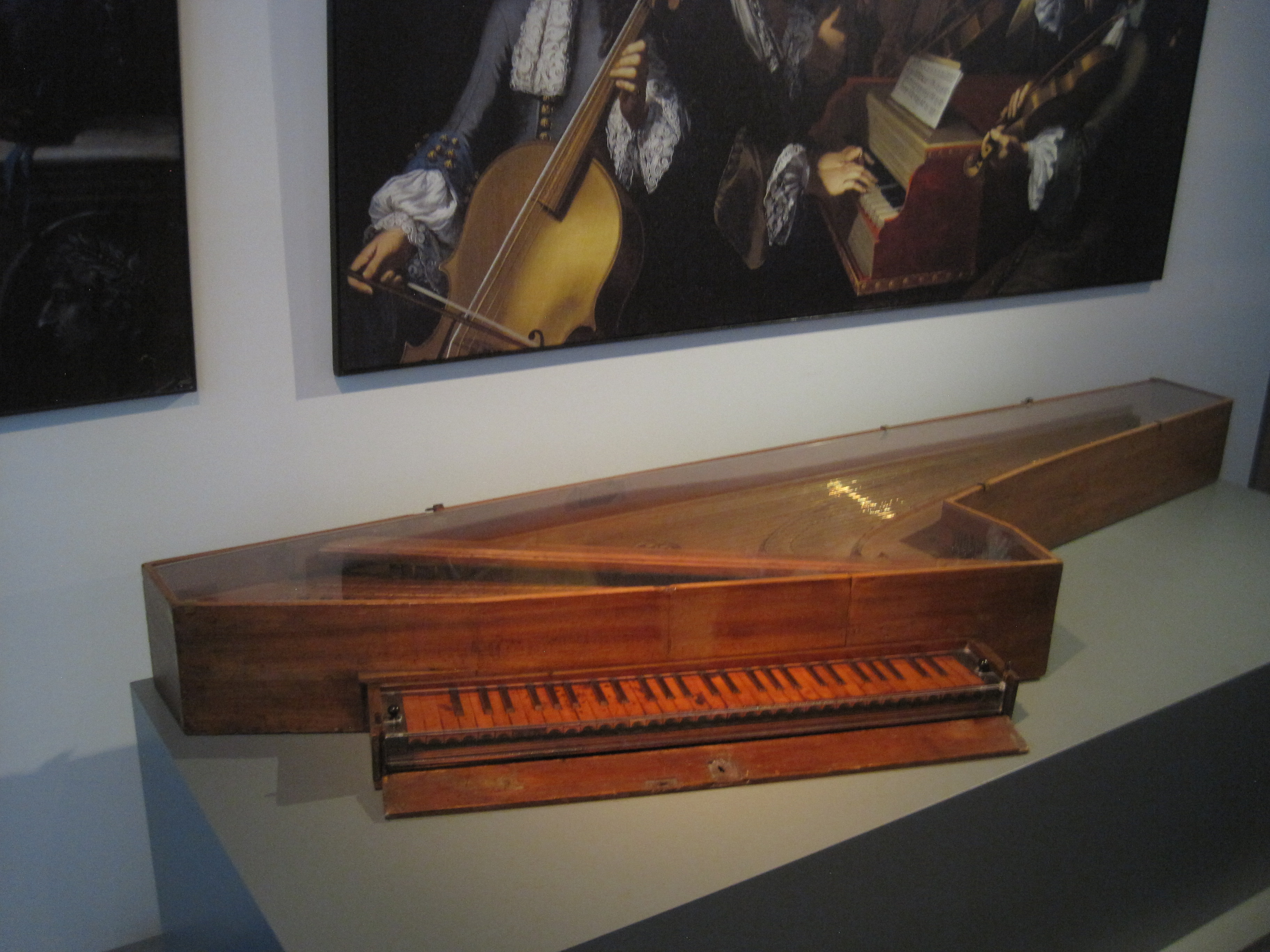
The Cristofori spinettone in the collections of the Musical Instrument Museum in Leipzig, Germany

The spinettone ("big spinet") was a kind of harpsichord invented in the late 17th century by Bartolomeo Cristofori, who was later the inventor of the piano. Other names for this instrument were spinettone da teatro ("of the theater"), spinetta traversa ("transverse spinet").

== Description ==
The spinettone was a kind of spinet, which means specifically that its strings were placed in pairs along a diagonal relative to the position of the keyboard. The jacks that plucked the strings were placed in opposite-facing pairs within the larger gaps between strings. Most spinets are smaller than regular harpsichords. The spinettone was very long, but narrower than a regular harpsichord.

The novelty of Cristofori's spinettone was that unlike any other spinet, it deployed multiple choirs of strings. Its disposition was 1 × 8′, 1 × 4′, which means one set of strings in the normal octave and one set that sounded an octave higher. As with all multichoired harpsichords, this necessitated two sets of jacks, one for each choir. The player could choose which choir of strings would sound (8′, 4′, or both together) by sliding the keyboard forward and backward. The internal mechanism that accomplished this was the same as the one that Cristofori had earlier used for his oval spinet.

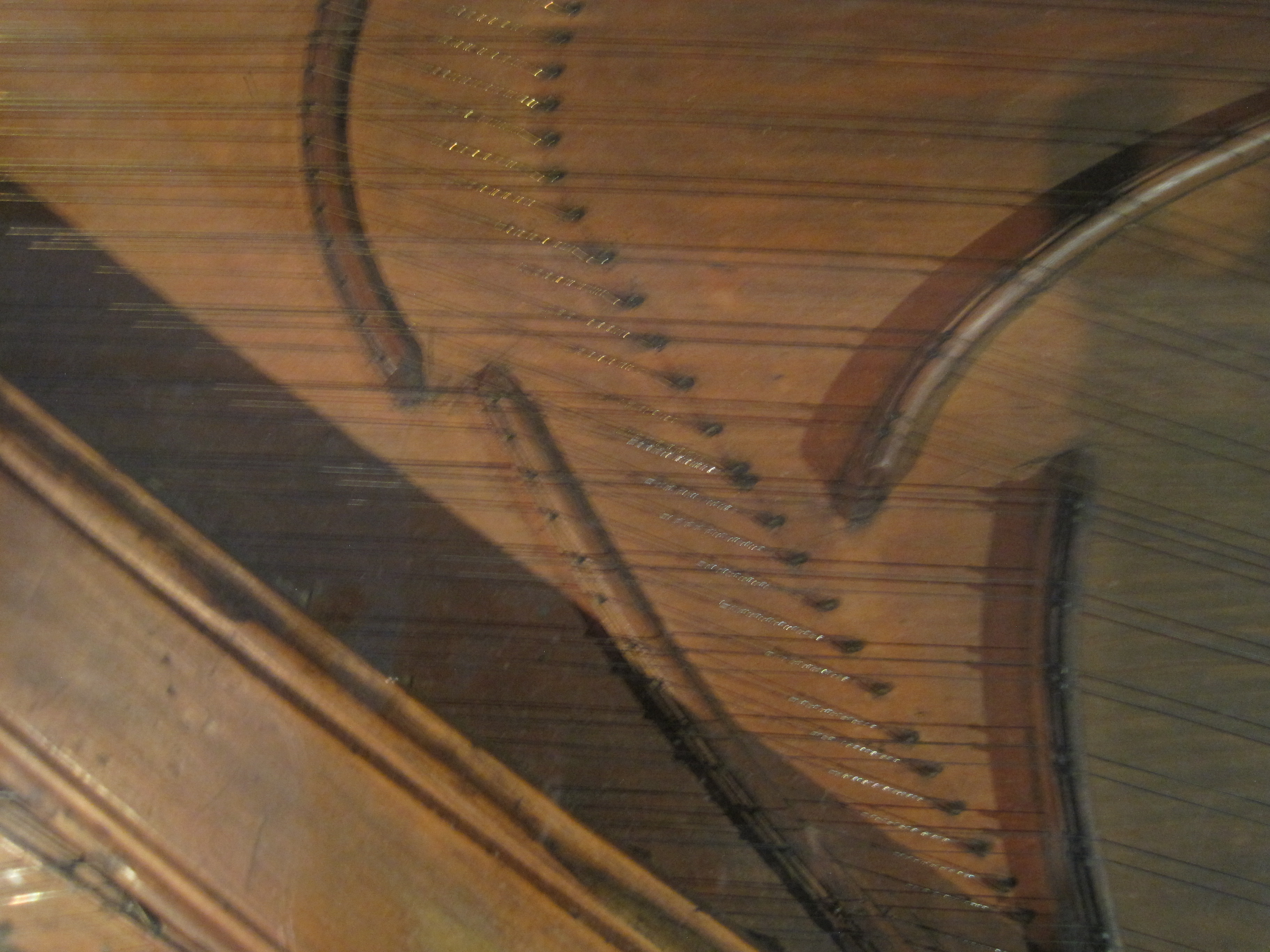
Detail of the spinettone illustrated above, showing the separate bridges employed for the iron strings in the top range. The four bridges are as follows: top left, four-foot bridge for lower strings (brass); top right, eight-foot bridge for lower strings (brass); lower left, four-foot bridge for higher strings (iron); lower right, eight-foot bridge for upper strings (iron)

As Kottick (2003) points out, the design of the spinettone attested to the extraordinary ingenuity of its inventor, which has been remarked on by a number of modern scholars (see Bartolomeo Cristofori). It is not at all straightforward to fit two sets of paired spinet jacks into the ordinary string layout of a spinet, which is more crowded owing to the slant of the strings. Cristofori was able to do this by using iron in the upper strings instead of his customary brass. These strings could then be made tenser — therefore longer, to sustain the same pitch — and thereby create the space needed for the jacks.

== History ==
The spinettone that Cristofori built were intended for the Medici family of Florence, more specifically for his patron Prince Ferdinando, the son of Grand Duke Cosimo III and heir to the Tuscan throne.

Prince Ferdinando was a great enthusiast for opera, and he organized many operatic productions at the Medici villa at Pratolino. According to Holmes (1999), the prince often participated as the continuo player, seated at a harpsichord among the orchestral musicians. The theatre the Prince had available at Pratolino was not very spacious, so there would be a strong incentive for the prince to have an instrument that was physically compact and able to fit easily in the orchestra, but endowed with multiple choirs of strings so as to be audible in performance. The spinettone was Cristofori's second effort to fulfill this requirement, the first one having been his (less successful) oval spinet.

Besides being smaller than a regular harpsichord, the spinettone had another advantage, pointed out by Kottick: owing to the diagonal geometry of the strings, the player could be seated more or less facing the performers on stage, while the sound was projected in the direction of the audience.

The great length of the spinettone was an advantage in the deep bass; as harpsichord scholar Grant O'Brien noted, "the bass strings are very long with very little bass string-scaling foreshortening" — in other words, their low pitch was achieved almost optimally, through length, rather than having to resort as in many instruments to lower tension or greater thickness. Kottick suggests that the instrument may have been designed to have a powerful bass because it was substituting for the theorbo, a plucked bass instrument, in performances.

The spinettone was a local success among the musicians of the Medici court. Montanari (2002) documents that Cristofori's spinettoni were constantly being loaned out from the Medici collection for use. He eventually built a total of four of them. Yet another was built later by his student Giovanni Ferrini.
