= Spinet =

Small form of keyboard instruments

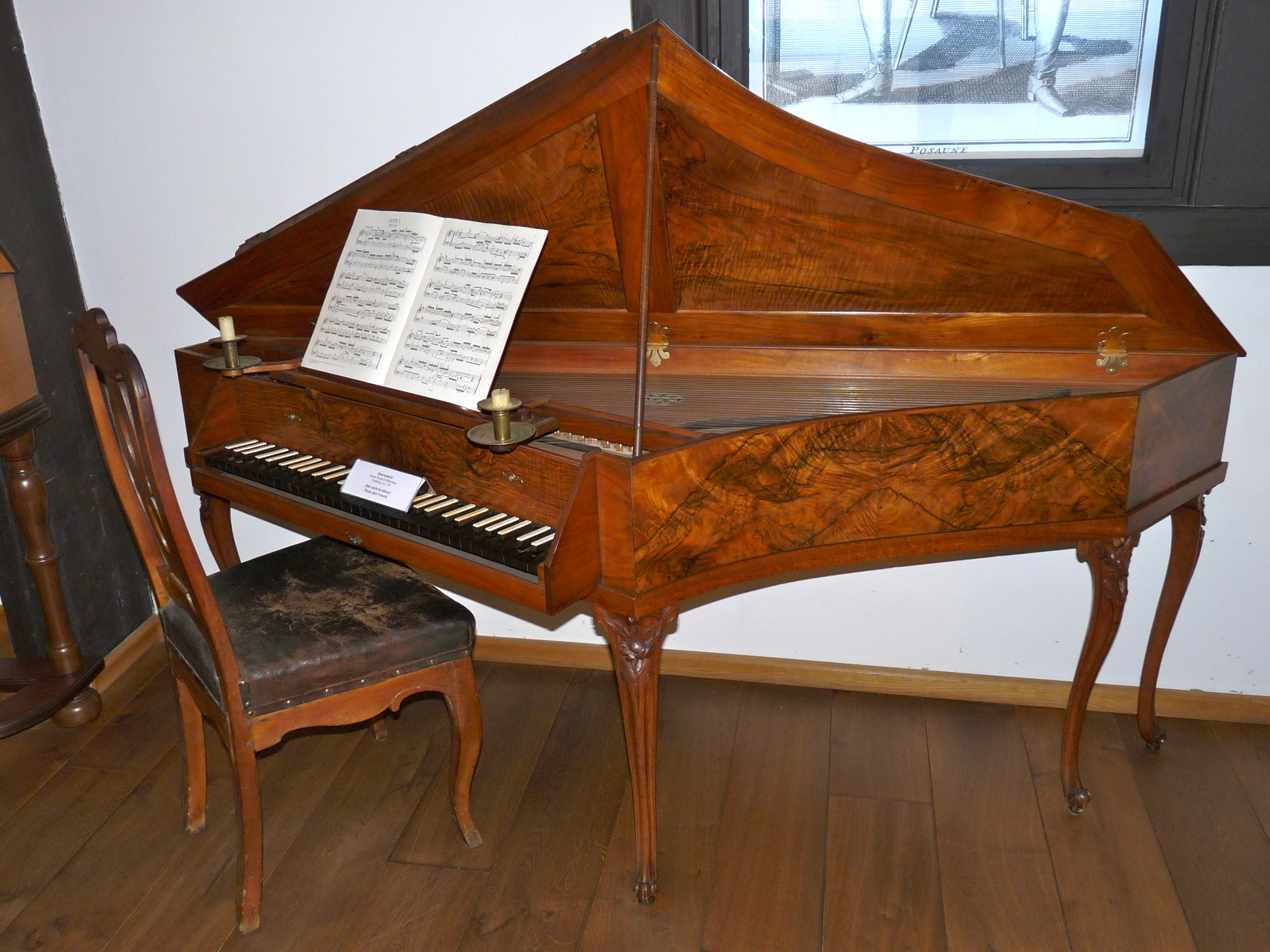
Spinet built in 1765 by Johann Heinrich Silbermann. Bachhaus, Eisenach, Germany. Click for a more detailed view, revealing the use of bookmatched veneering.

A spinet is a smaller type of harpsichord or other keyboard instrument, such as a piano or organ.

== Harpsichords ==
Domenico Scarlatti: Sonata in F minor K.69
Performed on a spinet by Ulrich Metzner

When the term spinet is used to designate a harpsichord, typically what is meant is the bentside spinet, described in this section. For other uses, see below.

The bentside spinet shares most of its characteristics with the full-size instrument, including action, soundboard, and case construction. What primarily distinguishes the spinet is the angle of its strings: whereas in a full-size harpsichord, the strings are at a 90-degree angle to the keyboard (that is, they are parallel to the player's gaze); and in virginals they are parallel to the keyboard, in a spinet the strings are at an angle of about 30 degrees to the keyboard, going toward the right.

The case of a bentside spinet is approximately triangular. The side on the right is usually bent concavely (hence the name of the instrument), curving away from the player toward the right rear corner. The longest side is adjacent to and parallel with the bass strings, going from the right rear corner to a location on the player's left. The front side of the spinet contains the keyboard. Typically, there are very short sides at the right rear and on the left, connecting the bentside to the long side and the long side to the front.

The other major aspect of spinet design is that the strings are arranged in pairs. The gap between the two strings of a pair is about four millimetres, and the wider gap between pairs is about ten. The jacks (which pluck the strings) are arranged in pairs as well, placed in the wider gap. They face in opposite directions, plucking the adjacent string on either side of the wider gap. The fact that half of the gaps are four millimetres instead of ten makes it possible to crowd more strings together into a smaller case.

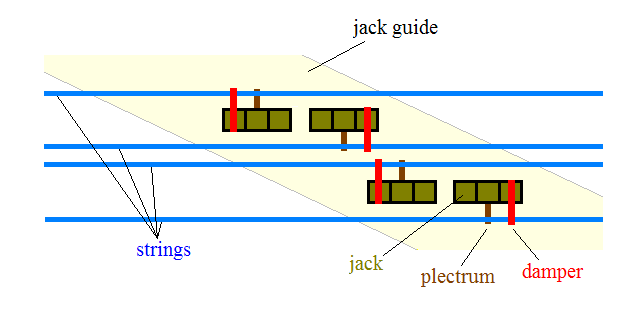
Diagram showing the arrangement of jacks and strings in a bentside spinet. For explanation, see main text. In the picture above, the jacks are concealed beneath the jack rail at the center of the instrument.

The disadvantage of the paired design is that it generally limits the spinet to a single choir of strings, at eight-foot pitch, In a full-size harpsichord, the registers that guide the jacks can be shifted slightly to one side, permitting the player to control whether or not that particular set of strings is sounded. This is difficult in a spinet, due to the alternating orientation of the jacks. There are occasional exceptions; thus, a double-strung spinet by John Player is known; see also the discussion of the "spinettone", below.

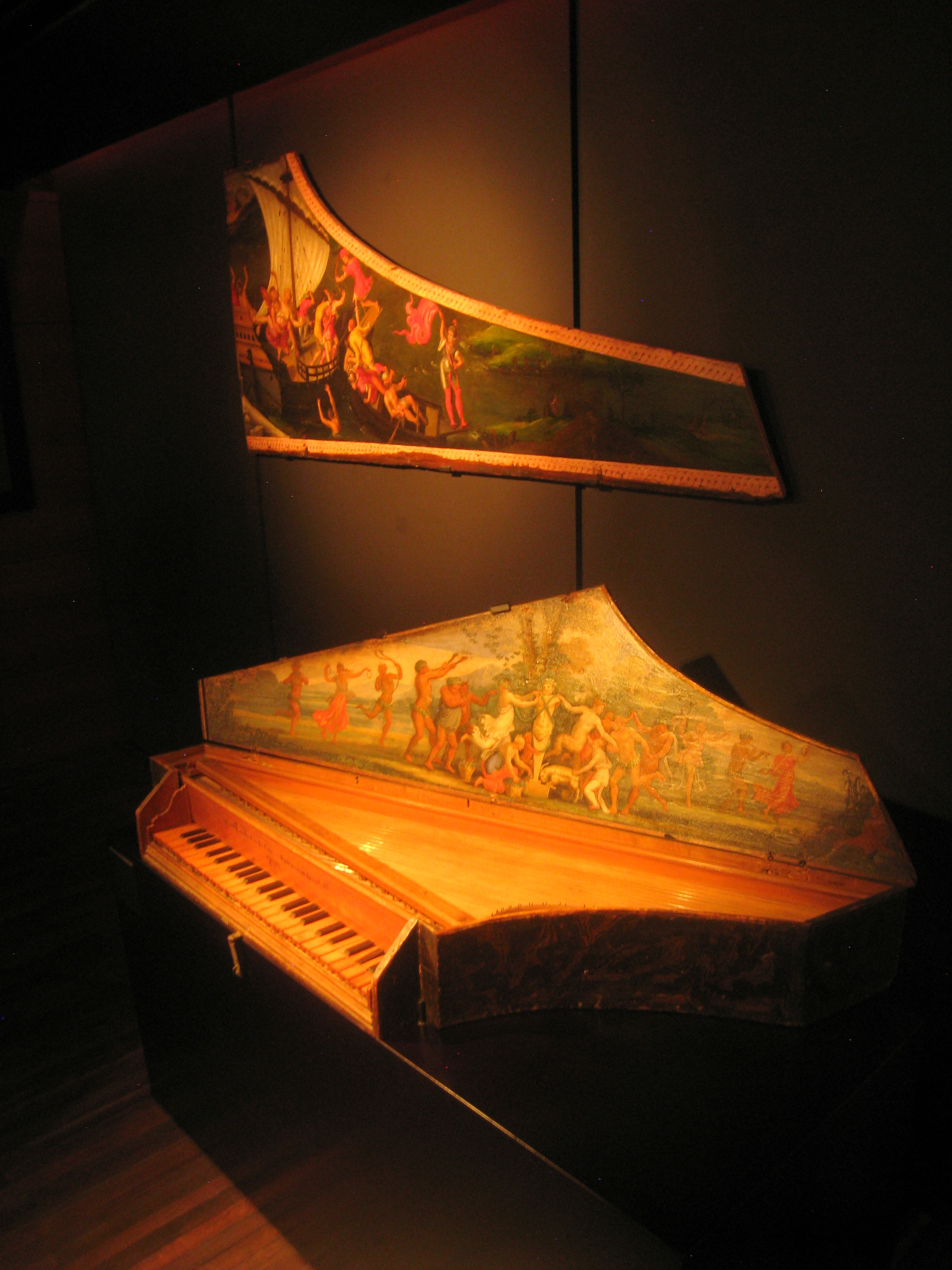
Spinet by Zenti from 1637, now in the Musical Instrument Museum in Brussels

The angling of the strings also had consequences for tone quality: generally, it was not possible to make the plucking points as close to the nut as in a regular harpsichord. Thus spinets normally had a slightly different tone quality, with fewer higher harmonics. Spinets also had smaller soundboards than regular harpsichords, and normally had a weaker sound. For these reasons, the spinet was normally only a domestic instrument, purchased to save money and conserve domestic space.

=== History ===
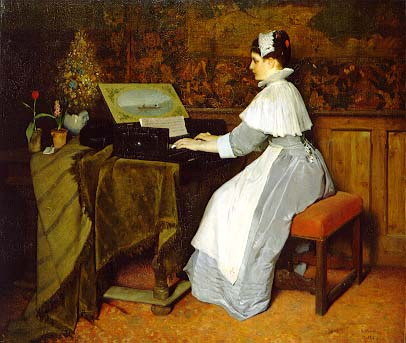
Girl at a Spinet, 1871 painting by Gabriel von Max

Harpsichord historian Frank Hubbard wrote in 1967, "the earliest [bentside] spinet known to me was made by Hieronymus de Zentis in 1631. It is quite possible that Zentis was the inventor of the type so widely copied in other countries." He further notes that the spinet in France was sometimes called the épinette à l'italienne, supporting an Italian origin.

In England, builders included John Player, Thomas Barton, Charles Haward, Stephen Keene, Cawton Aston, and Thomas Hitchcock.

The spinet was later developed into the spinettone ("big spinet") by Bartolomeo Cristofori (1655–1731), the inventor of the piano. The spinettone incorporated multiple choirs of strings, with a disposition of 1 × 8 ft, 1 × 4 ft, and used the same ingenious mechanism for changing stops that Cristofori had earlier used for his oval spinet. The spinettone was a local success among the musicians of the Medici court, and Cristofori eventually built a total of four of them.

Spinets are occasionally made today, sometimes from kits, and serve the same purpose they always have, of saving money and space.

=== Other uses of "spinet" for harpsichords ===
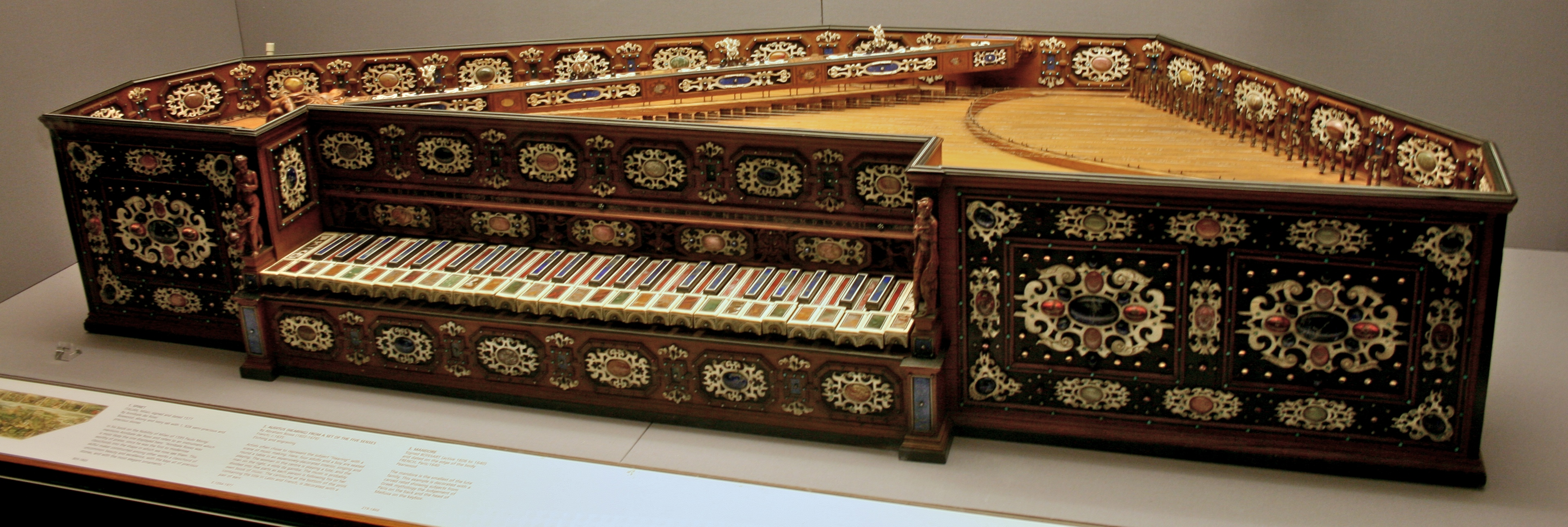
A sumptuously decorated pentagonal spinet from 1577 by Annibale dei Rossi; 49 keys

The pentagonal spinet was not a spinet in the sense given above, but rather a virginal; its strings were parallel to the keyboard. Typically, the pentagonal spinet was more compact than other types of virginals, as the pentagon shape arose from lopping off the corners of the original rectangular virginal design.

More generally, the word spinet was not always very sharply defined in former times, particularly in its French and Italian cognate forms épinette and spinetta. Thus, for example, when Bartolomeo Cristofori invented a new kind of virginals in 1688, he called it the "spinetta ovale", "oval spinet".

=== Nomenclature ===
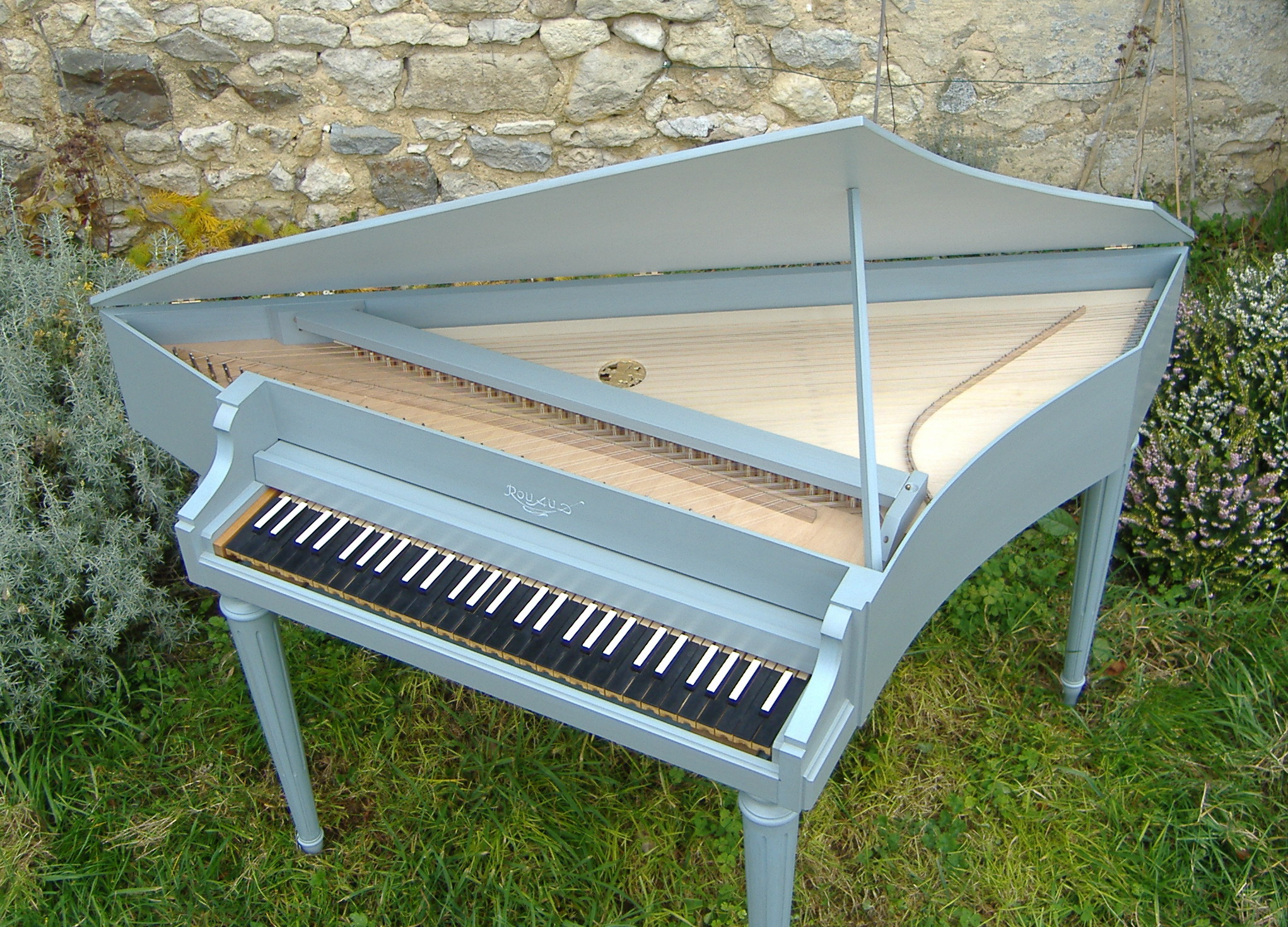
Modern bentside spinet built by Clavecins Rouaud, Paris

In earlier times when English spelling was less standardized, "spinet" was sometimes spelled "spinnet" or "spinnit". "Spinet" is standard today.

Spinet derives from the Italian spinetta, which in 17th-century Italian was a word used generally for all quilled instruments, especially what in Elizabethan/Jacobean English were called virginals. The specific Italian word for a virginals is spinetta a tabola. Likewise, the French derivation from spinetta, épinette, is specifically what the virginals is called in French, although the word is also used for any other small quilled instrument, whether a small harpsichord or a clavichord. In German, Spinett and Querflügel are used.

A dumb spinet is a manichord or "clavichord or clarichord", according to the 1913 edition of Webster's Dictionary.

== Pianos ==
The spinet piano, manufactured from the 1930s until recent times, was the culmination of a trend among manufacturers to make pianos smaller and cheaper. It served the purpose of making pianos available for a low price, for owners who had little space for a piano. Many spinet pianos still exist today, left over from their period of manufacture.

The defining characteristic of the spinet was its drop action (sometimes called indirect blow action). In this device, the keys did not engage the action directly; rather they pulled upward on rods called "stickers", which in turn pulled upward on levers located below the level of the keyboard, which in turn engaged the action. The stickers were sufficiently long that the hammer heads (the highest part of the action) ended up at roughly the same vertical level as the keyboard.

Thanks to the drop action, spinet pianos could be made very small; the top of a spinet rose only a few inches above the level of the keyboard itself. However, according to piano author Larry Fine, the cost in quality was considerable. The stickers were "often noisy and troublesome". Moreover, to make room for them, the keys had to be made shorter, resulting in "very poor leverage" and thus a poor sense of touch and control for the player. Lastly, the very short strings of the spinet resulted in a narrow range of harmonics and thus in poor tone quality.

The spinet was also the bane of piano technicians. Concerning the difficulty of servicing them, Fine writes

Spinets ... are very difficult to service because even the smallest repair requiring removal of the action becomes a major ordeal. Each of the connecting stickers has to be disconnected and tied up to the action and all the keys have to be removed from the piano before the action can be lifted out.

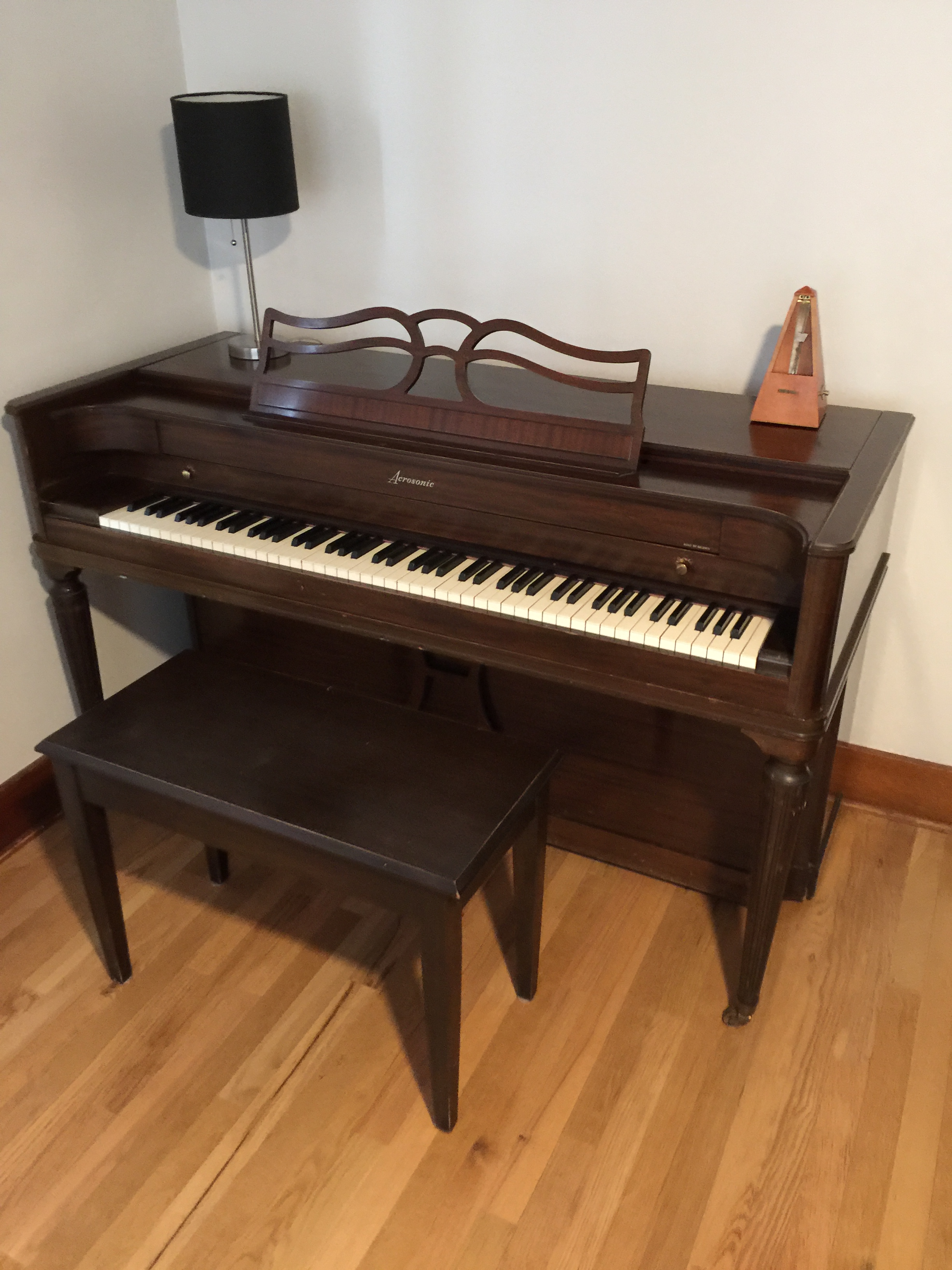
Spinet piano made by Baldwin and sold under the brand name Acrosonic. Date of manufacture unknown.

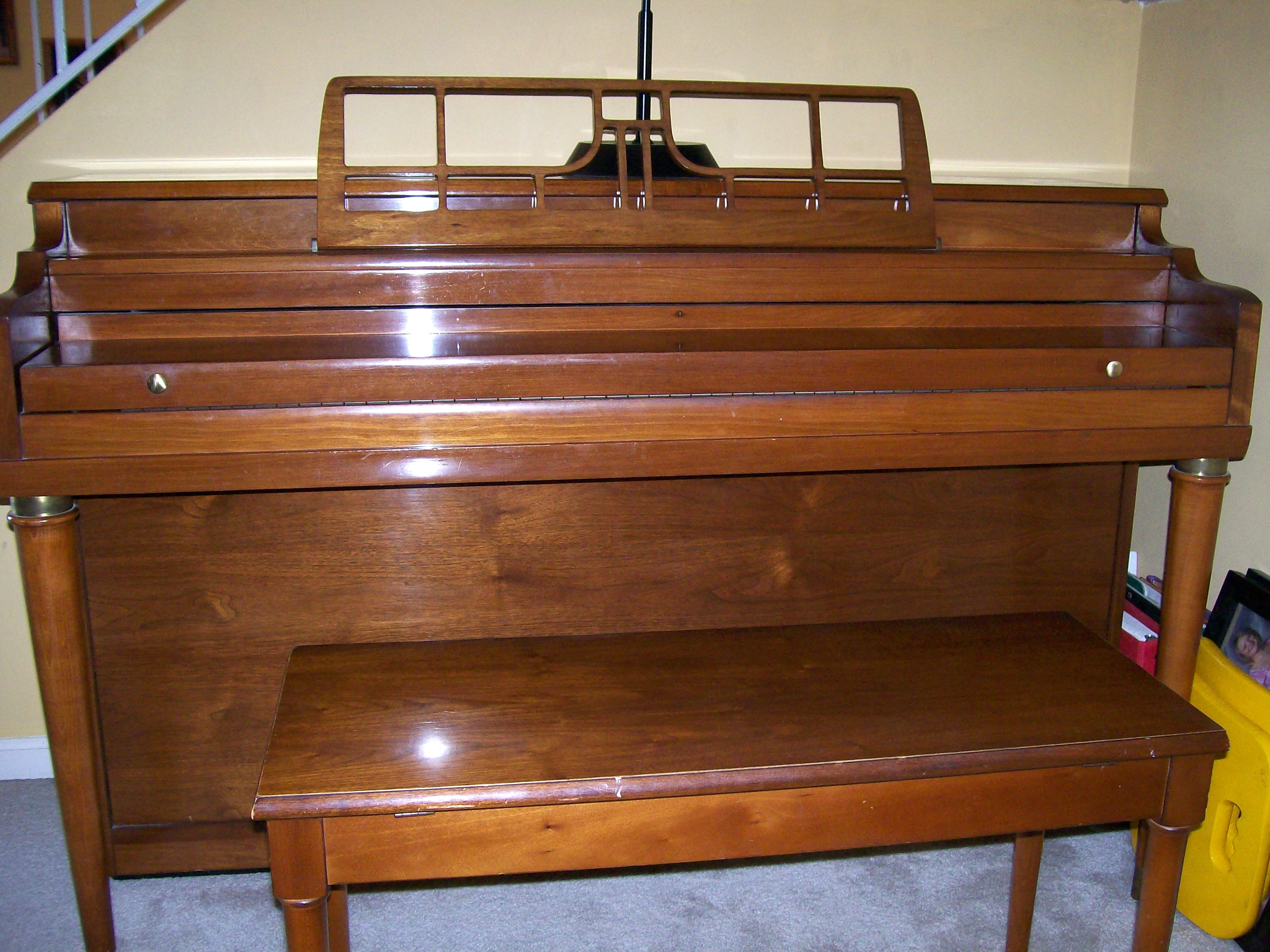
A spinet piano manufactured by Gulbransen

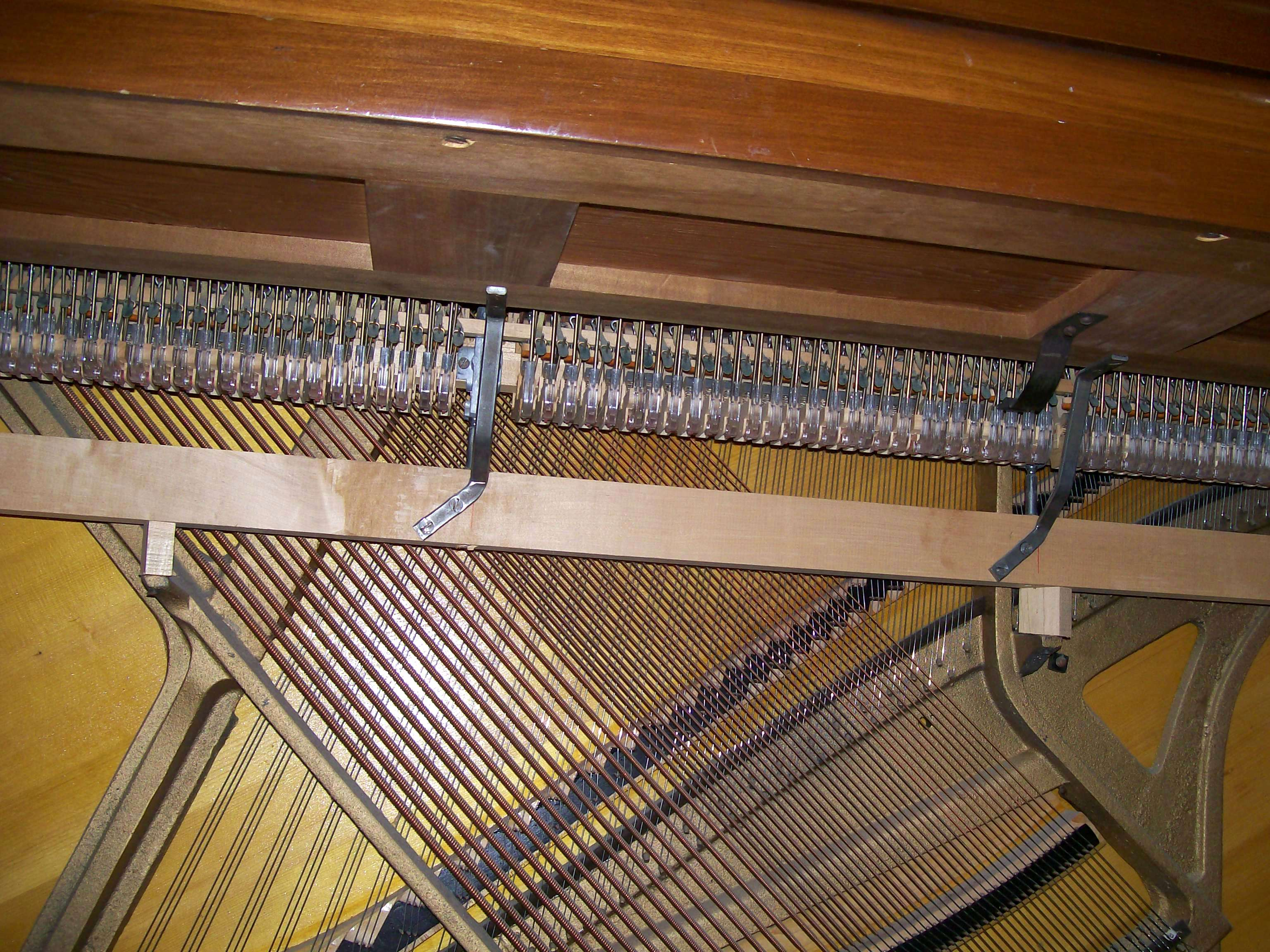
Detail of the interior structure of the Gulbransen spinet shown above. The drop action, lying below the level of the keyboard, can be seen, as well as the extreme angling of the strings needed to provide sufficient length of strings within the limited case height. Click on image for expanded view.

=== History ===
According to piano historian Arthur Loesser (1954), the first spinet piano was offered to the public in May 1935, by an American manufacturer Loesser does not identify. However, according to the Blue Book of Pianos, this manufacturer was Winter and Company (which eventually became part of the Aeolian-American Corporation) who sold this piano as the Winter "Musette". The Musette, along with its spinet cousins, were initially a success, being the only kind of piano that many people could afford in the depths of the Great Depression. (According to Loesser, the price could be less than $300, "about twenty-five percent lower than ... a small upright of 1924.") Loesser notes that the spinet was not entirely new, as very small pianos had been manufactured at various times in the 19th century.

After the 1930s, many people still continued to purchase spinets; a 1947 study showed that about 50 percent of all pianos sold during that production year were pianos strung vertically of 37 inches (0.94 m) in height or less. The spinet enjoyed decades of popularity after the 1930s, but production was halted in the early 1990s.

== Organs ==
The spinet organ, a product of the mid-20th century, served the same function (domestic context, low cost) that was served by spinet harpsichords and spinet pianos. The spinet organ physically resembled a small upright piano, and presented simplified controls and functions that were both less expensive to produce and less intimidating to learn than other organs.
