= Cawton Aston =

English builder of spinets

Cawton Aston (active 1693 – 1733) was an English builder of spinets.

He was the seventh and last apprentice of instrument builder John Player (1636 - 1707), and the only one to set up his own business. In 1730 he was living at the Prince's Arms in New Queen Street in London.

Two spinets signed by Aston are currently known; the first is dated 1726 and has the range GG-g΄΄΄ (five octaves). The case is decorated with inlay. The natural keys are covered in bone, and the sharps are made of a “sandwich” of ivory and ebony, sometimes referred to as “skunk-tail sharps” because of their appearance. The instrument was restored by Arnold Dolmetsch in 1898; Colonial Williamsburg purchased it in 1960.

The second instrument was built in 1733 and also has the range GG-g΄΄΄. The keyboard has ivory-covered naturals and skunk-tail sharps, just as on the 1726 spinet. Many parts, such as the bridge, nut, and stand are replacements; the soundboard rose is probably not original. The instrument has been in a private collection in England for approximately thirty years.

A spinet built c.1700 whose lowest key is marked “C.A.” has been attributed to Aston; this instrument is currently part of the Richard Burnett Heritage Collection. It has the range GG/BB-d΄΄΄ (4½ octaves), with a broken octave. This compass is very common in spinets made between 1690 and 1710. The natural keys are covered with ebony, while the sharps are solid ivory. Overall the instrument is similar to those made by John Player.

Peter Mole states that

Judging by the stylishness of the spinet by Cawton Aston dated 1726 at Colonial Williamsburg, Cawton Aston seems to have been a craftsman of great skill, and a firm constituted by him and by [Thomas] Barton would have been a significant competitor to the [Stephen] Keene firm in the period 1709 to 1712.

Boalch mentions a spinet signed by Cawton Aston and Thomas Barton, dated 1709, that once belonged to Edwin M. Ripin. Boalch believed it to be in the Museum of Fine Arts, Boston; however, this instrument is not currently in that collection.

== Discography ==
- Henry Purcell: The Suites for Harpsichord, Archiv Produktion 2533415 (1979) (c.1700 spinet)
- From Two to Six, Finchcocks Press FPCD003 (2001) (c.1700 spinet)
