= Tony Chinnery =

Harpsichord maker

Tony Chinnery is a builder of historical keyboard instruments, particularly of harpsichords and early fortepianos. He keeps a workshop not far from Florence in Italy. The instruments from their workshop, which generally are replicas of particular historical instruments, are widely used by performers and have appeared in many recordings. They have been played in concert by such performers as Gustav Leonhardt, Kenneth Gilbert, and Ton Koopman.

A number of the instruments can be seen in museums:

- A replica of a 1697 harpsichord by Carlo Grimaldi is in the Cleveland Museum of Art (link)
- A copy of the 1726 piano by Bartolomeo Cristofori was commissioned by the Museum of Musical Instruments at the University of Leipzig. (link)
- A copy of Cristofori's 1690 oval spinet resides in the Galleria dell'Accademia in Florence.
