= Giovanni Battista Giusti (harpsichord maker) =

- Born: 1624
- Died: 1693
- Occupation: Musical-instrument maker

≤

Giovanni Battista Giusti (c. 1624 - c. 1693) was a musical-instrument maker. He was a student first of Giovani Battista Boni, then Girolamo Zenti. He lived in Lucca, Italy.
