= Girolamo Zenti =

17th-century Italian harpsichord maker and organ builder

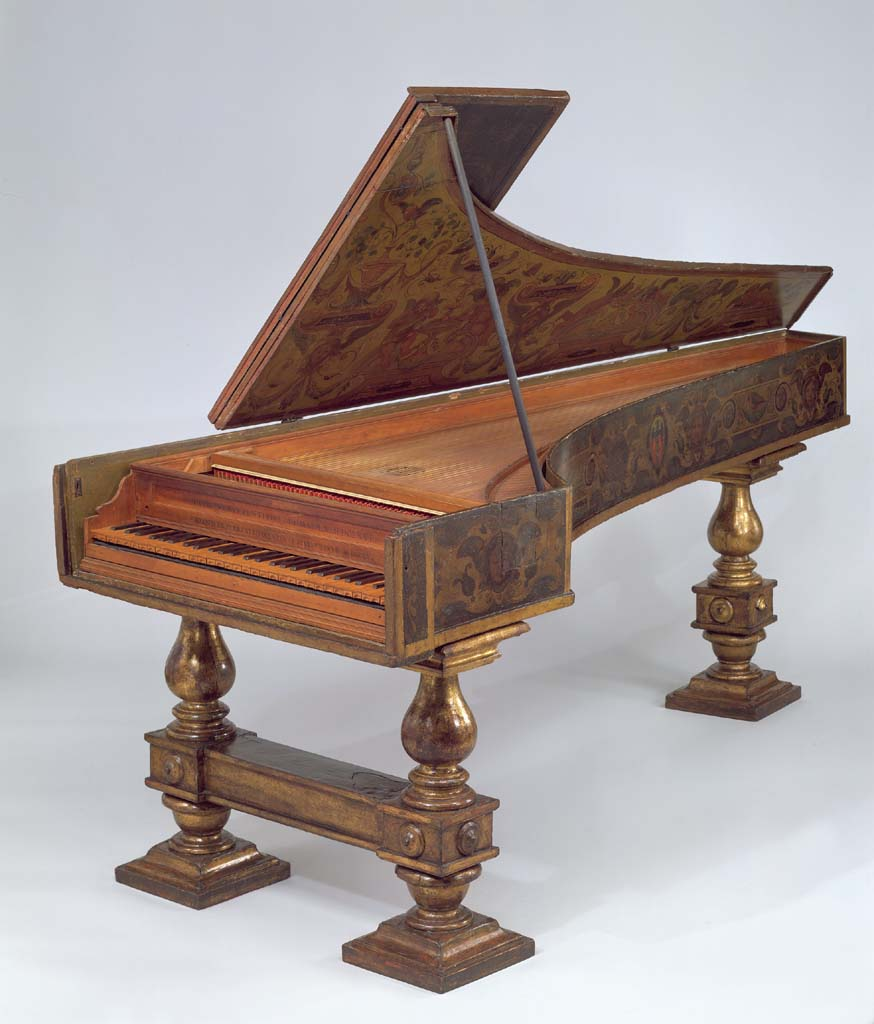
1666 Harpsichord.

Girolamo Zenti (Viterbo c.1609 - Paris c.1666) (also: Girolama de Zenti, Gerolamo de Sentis, Hieronymus de Zentis) was an Italian harpsichord maker and organ builder in the 17th century. He is known as the probable inventor of the bentside spinet and for having traveled unusually extensively to practice his trade at the courts of Europe, including Rome, Florence, Paris, London and Stockholm.

== Biography ==
Information on Zenti's life is fragmentary and spread wide. Zenti was born in Viterbo, near Rome, and was registered as an instrument maker in the papal capital by 1638. He was apprentice to Giovani Battista Boni, and took over the workshop at the latter's death in 1641. He took a commission at the Swedish court in 1653, serving Queen Christina for several years. He took an Organ building project in Rome in 1660, but left the instrument unfinished for Paris. By 1664 he was in service at the newly restored English court of Charles II. He received the title of The King's virginal maker, but was back in Rome before the year was out. Two years later he was again in Paris, where he died in 1666. At some point he was probably in service of the Medici family in Florence, for an inventory made at Bartolomeo Cristofori's arrival there in 1700 lists six Zenti instruments.

== Zenti and the bentside spinet ==
It is not proven that Zenti invented the bentside spinet, but the earliest existing bentside spinet (1631) is by Zenti, and the instrument became popular, especially in Britain, after his travels there. The final clue giving this theory support is that in France the bentside spinet was called: espinette á l'italienne.

== Surviving instruments ==
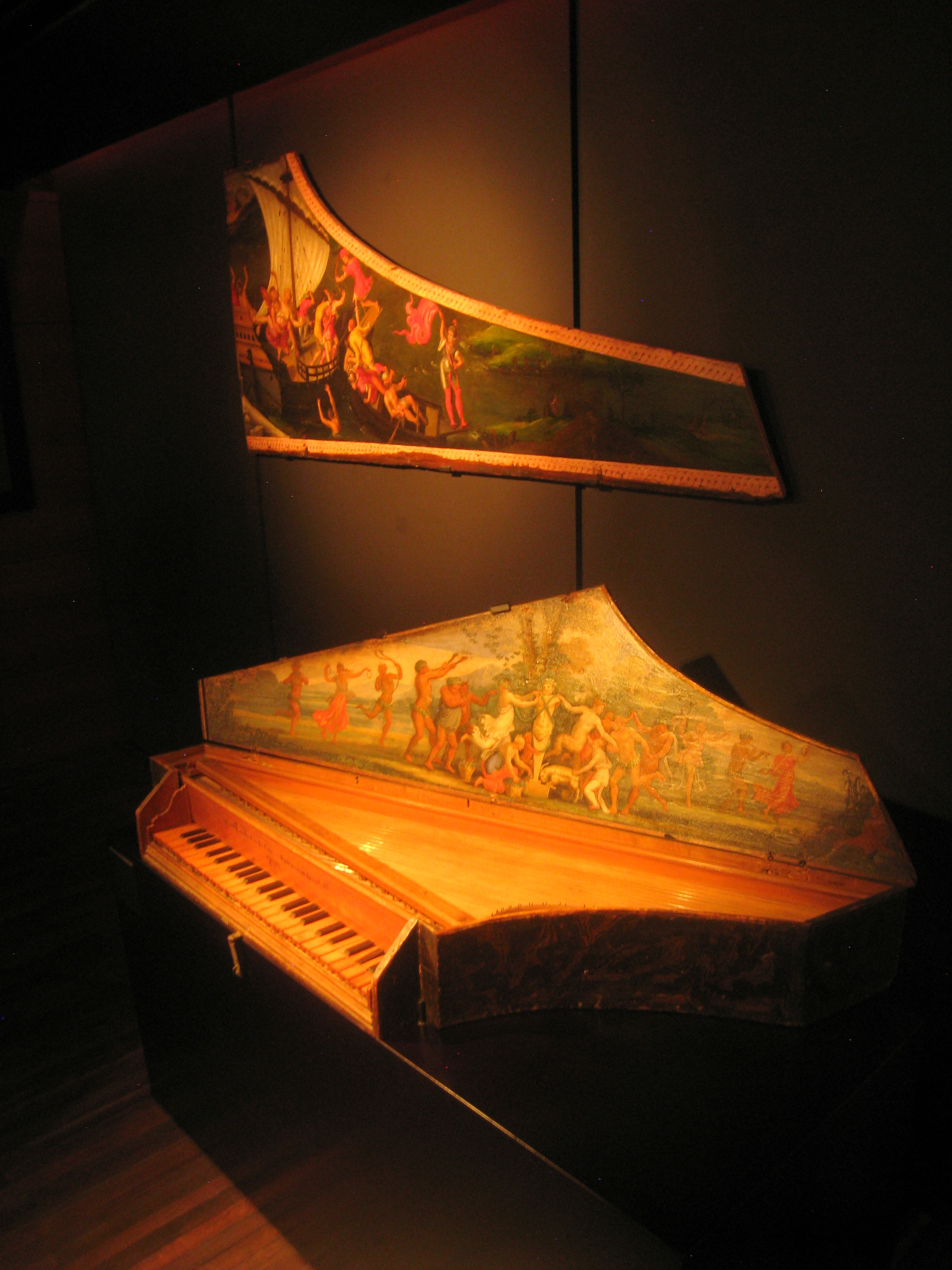
Spinet by Zenti from 1637, now in the Musical Instrument Museum in Brussels

No instruments from his time in northern Europe have been discovered, but around a dozen instruments from Italy have been attributed to him, although only two with certainty, a bentside spinet and a harpsichord. The most famous is without doubt the 1631 bentside spinet now in Brussels. A true inner instrument of thinwalled cypress in an ornate outer box, single scale in brass. A harpsichord, now preserved at the Metropolitan Museum of Art in NY, dated to the year of his death in 1666, is a single manual, 2x8', true inner-outer instrument, notably restored by Cristofori's apprentice, Giovani Ferrini, bearing the inscription: "HIERONYMUS ZENTI FECIT ROMAE A.S. MDCLXVI/ JOANNES FERRINI FLORENTINVS RESTAVRAVIT MDCCLV" The Metropolitan museum also houses an octave spinet probably by Zenti of unusually small size, possibly made for a child. In the Deutsches Museum in Munich there is an instrument traced through organological evidence to Zenti, that regrettably is a victim of Leopoldo Franciolini, a noted antiques fraudster in the late 19th century who ruined the instrument by installing two extra keyboards to pump up its price.

== See also ==
- List of historical harpsichord makers
- Giovanni Batista Giusti (harpsichord maker)
- Bartolomeo Cristofori

== Sources ==
- Kottick EL, A History of the Harpsichord, 2003, Indiana University Press.
- Kipnis I, The Harpsichord and Clavichord: An Encyclopedia, 2013, Routledge
- Boalch, Builders of the Harpsichord and clavichord 1480 - 1840, 1 ed, 1956, Oxford University Press.
