= Museo nazionale degli strumenti musicali =

Italian museum

Coordinates: 41.8889°N 12.5147°E

National Museum of Musical Instruments
- Museo nazionale degli strumenti musicali
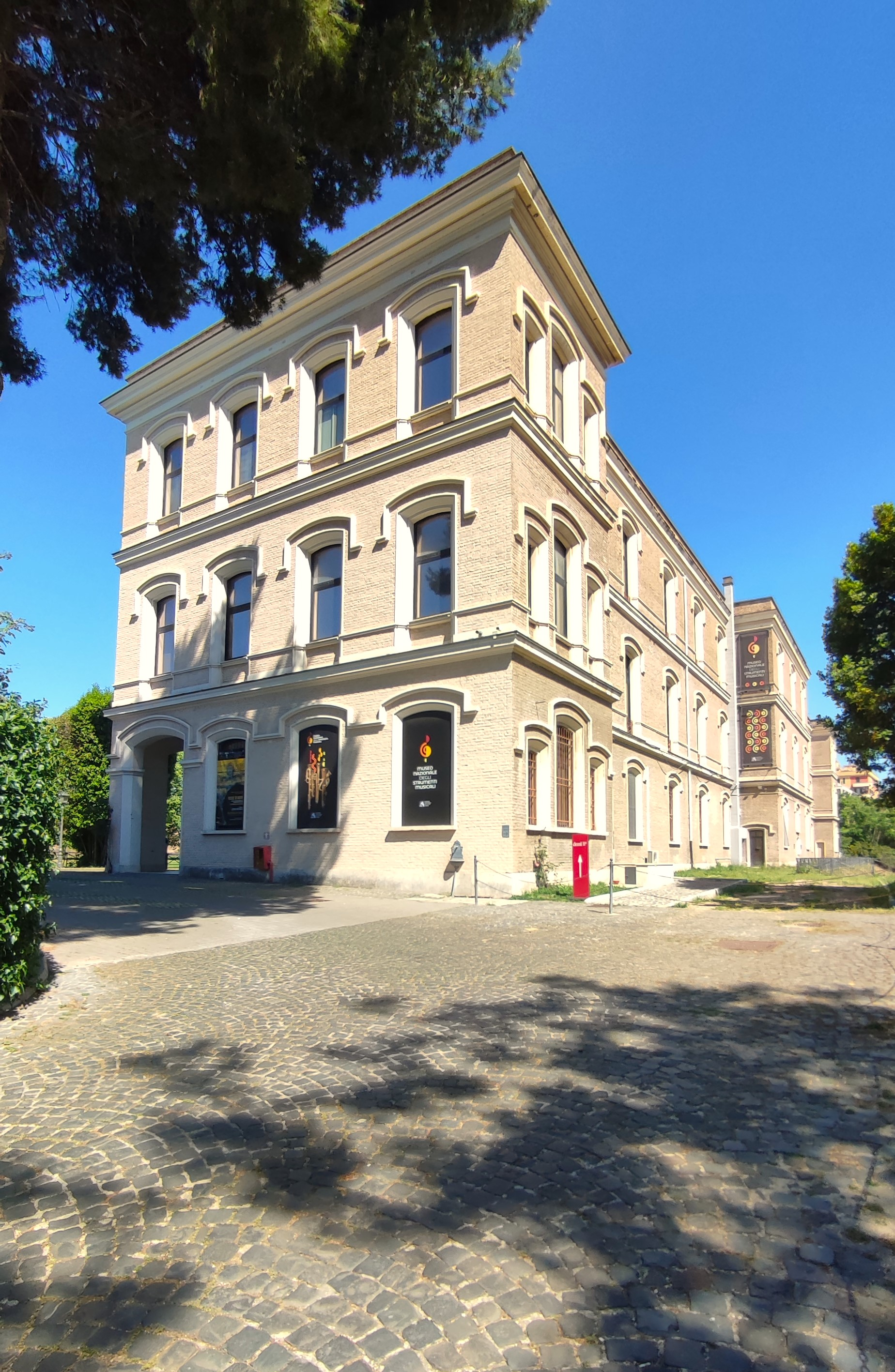
- Location: Rome, Italy
- Director: Sonia Martone
- Website: museostrumentimusicali.beniculturali.it

The National Museum of Musical Instruments is situated in the Palazzina Samoggia in Rome. The museum, owned by the MIBACT since December 2014 is one of 43 museums pertaining to the Polo museale del Lazio. The museum had 9,164 visitors in 2015.

== See also ==
- List of music museums
