= Stewart Pollens =

Stewart Pollens is an expert on historical musical instruments. His work includes restoration, analysis, and scholarly publication; and it embraces keyboard instruments (the harpsichord and fortepiano) as well as historical stringed instruments such as the violin and cello. Andrew Manze has called him "one of the world’s foremost authorities on musical instruments."

== Life and career ==
Stewart Pollens was born in New York in 1949 and trained as a violin and keyboard-instrument maker. In the 1970s he apprenticed with harpsichord builder John Challis and studied violin-making with Mittenwald faculty at the University of New Hampshire. From 1976 to 2006 he served as the Conservator of Musical Instruments at the Metropolitan Museum of Art in New York. His work there included the restoration and maintenance of the museum's encyclopedic collection of over 5,000 instruments, as well as research, writing, and lecturing on the collection.

After leaving the Metropolitan Museum, Pollens formed Violin Advisor, LLC, a consulting firm that authenticates and evaluates fine violins. In addition to his work there, Pollens restores stringed and early keyboard instruments for private collectors and museums (including an early New York piano for the Merchant's House Museum, an English bentside spinet for the Van Cortland House, and a Viennese fortepiano for the Morris-Jumel Mansion). He has done keyboard restoration and recording preparation work for Leonard Bernstein, Paul Badura-Skoda, John Browning, Mieczyslaw Horszowski, Byron Janis, Igor Kipnis, and many others. Among the more unusual instruments that he has restored are an accordion once owned by Alice "In Wonderland" P. Liddell and a tambourine painted by Toulouse-Lautrec.

Pollens is a contributor to The New Grove Dictionary of Music and Musicians and The Strad.

Pollens is married to the concert violinist Stephanie Chase.

== Research ==
Pollens's research findings include the source of the design for the decorative inlay of Stradivari 's "Greffuhle" violin and a chemical analysis of Stradivari's violin varnish. In 1999, Pollens challenged the authenticity of the world's most famous violin, the Ashmolean Museum's Messiah Stradivarius, in a series of articles published in the Journal of the Violin Society of America. The controversy initiated by these articles and presentations at the Violin Society of America and the American Federation of Violin Makers was widely reported.

== Select bibliography ==
- — (2022). A History of Stringed Keyboard Instruments. Cambridge, United Kingdom; New York, NY. ISBN 9781108421997. OCLC 1253441937.
- — (2017). Bartolomeo Cristofori and the Invention of the Piano. Cambridge, United Kingdom. ISBN 9781107096578. OCLC 962409806.
- — (2015). The Manual of Musical Instrument conservation. Cambridge, United Kingdom. ISBN 9781107077805. OCLC 893409220.
- — (2010). Stradivari. Cambridge: Cambridge University Press. ISBN 9780521873048. OCLC 456838759.
- — (2001). François-Xavier Tourte, Bow Maker. New York: Machold Rare Violins. ISBN 9780970541703. OCLC 48213959.
- — (1995). The Early Pianoforte. Cambridge: Cambridge University Press. ISBN 9780521111553. OCLC 316426066.
- — (1994). The Violin Masterpieces of Guarneri del Gesù: An Exhibition at the Metropolitan Museum of Art Commemorating the 250th Anniversary of the Maker's Death. London: P. Biddulph. ISBN 9780952010913. OCLC 41213545.
- — (1992). The Violin Forms of Antonio Stradivari. London: Peter Biddulph. ISBN 9780952010906. OCLC 28968670.
- — (1980). Forgotten Instruments: The Katonah Gallery, November 15, 1980-January 18, 1981. OCLC 7247586.

== See also ==
- History of the harpsichord
- Fortepiano
- Antonio Stradivari
