= Disposition (harpsichord) =

The disposition of a harpsichord is the set of choirs of strings it contains. This article describes various dispositions and gives the standard notation for describing them.

If a harpsichord contains just one set of strings at normal concert pitch, its disposition is called 1 x 8'. Here, the 8' means eight foot pitch, which designates normal pitch.

Harpsichord makers sometimes produced ottavini, which were little harpsichords that sounded one octave above normal pitch. The disposition of an ottavino would be called 1 x 4', meaning it has one set of strings at four foot pitch.

More substantial harpsichords contain more than one choir of strings. Their dispositions are described as above, using digits to count each type of choir. Thus, for example, many historical Italian harpsichords had the disposition 2 x 8'. The harpsichords of the celebrated French makers of the 18th century, such as Pascal Taskin, were more often 2 x 8', 1 x 4' (the 4' choir sounded simultaneously with one or both of the 8' choirs, combining to produce a sound with 8' pitch, but an edgier tone quality). German makers occasionally included a 16-foot choir (one octave lower), which combined auditorily with the 8-foot choirs to produce a deep, sonorous tone; thus an instrument built 1710 by the German builder J. A. Hass had the disposition 1 x 16', 2 x 8', 1 x 4'.
