= Eight-foot pitch =

Standard pitch designation

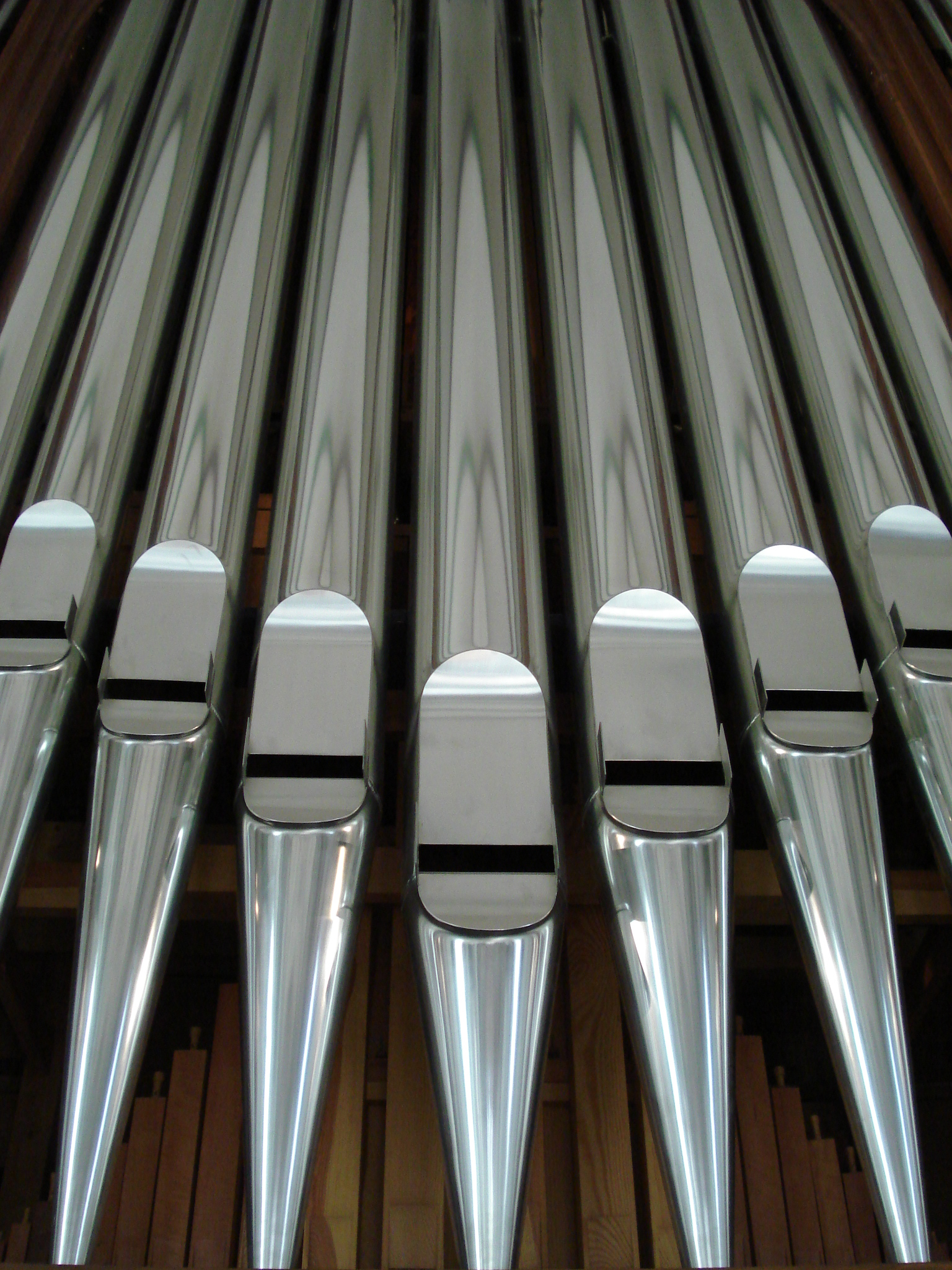

The system of describing organ pipes or harpsichord strings with a particular number of "feet" is a way of relating the pitch actually sounded by the pipe or the string to the conventional pitch assigned to the key that activates it.

== Pipe pitch and octaves ==
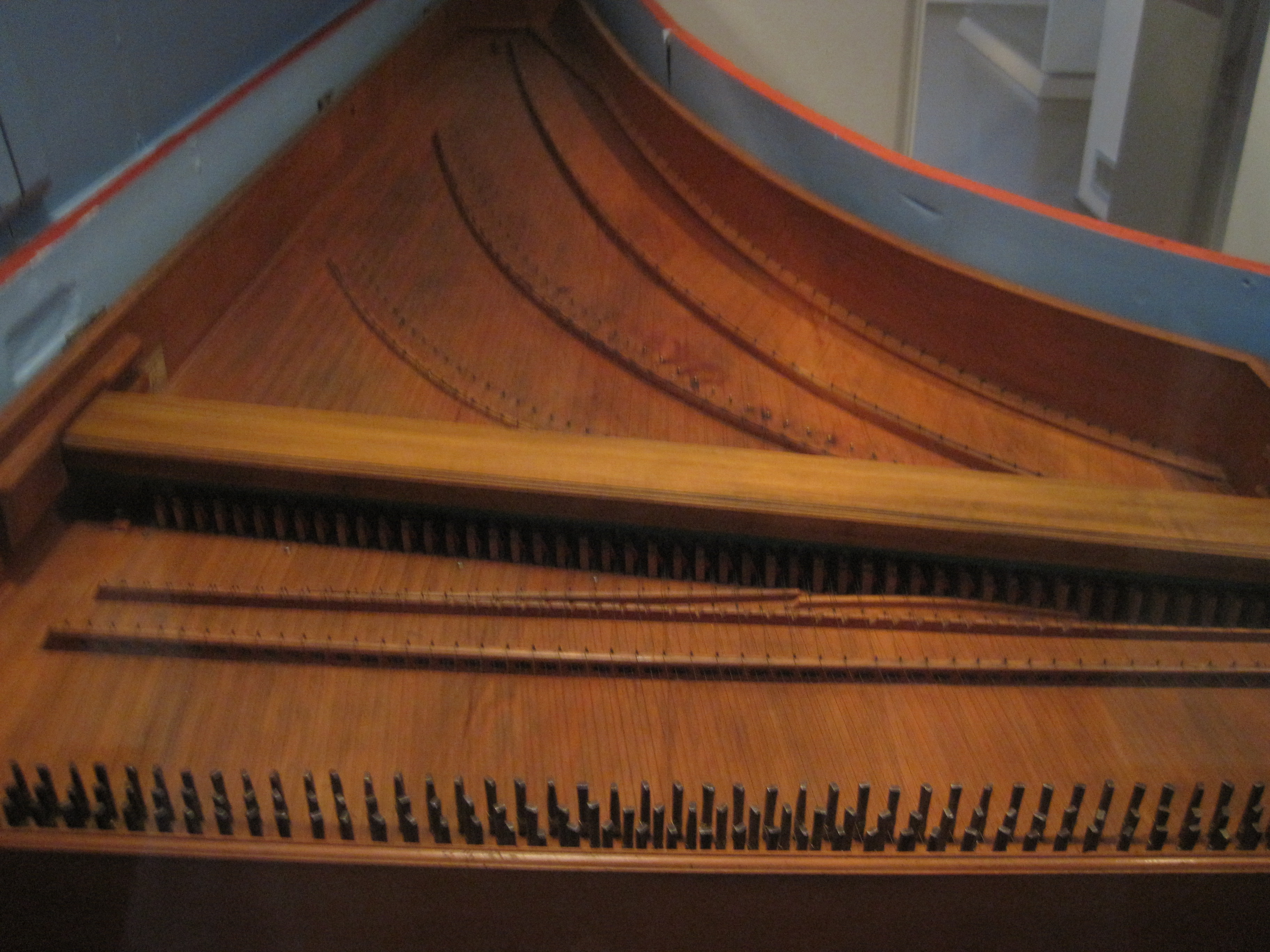
This unusual harpsichord made by Bartolomeo Cristofori has three choirs of strings, at 8-foot, 4-foot, and 2-foot pitch. The three separate bridges needed for these choirs may be seen on the soundboard (click to enlarge)

A pipe or string designated as eight-foot pitch (8′) is sounded at the pitch ordinarily assigned to the key. For example, the key for A above middle C activates an eight-foot pipe or string that sounds the standard pitch of this A, such as 440 Hz for an instrument tuned to the A440 pitch standard. Pipes or strings identified as longer sound a lower pitch than the assigned key whereas pipes identified as shorter sound higher.

Doubling the length of a pipe or string halves its natural frequency, whereas halving the length of a pipe or string doubles its natural frequency. Examples include:

- A sixteen-foot pitch (16′) pipe sounds a pitch one octave lower than its designated key. The A-440 key would sound at a pitch of 220 Hz.
- A four-foot pitch (4′) pipe sounds a pitch one octave higher than its designated key. The A-440 key would sound at a pitch of 880 Hz.
- A two-foot pitch (2′) pipe sounds a pitch two octaves higher than its designated key. The A-440 key would sound at a pitch of 1760 Hz.

In organs and harpsichords, the depression of a key often sounds both a string or pipe at eight-foot pitch and also other pipes and strings at different pitches. This is a method for enriching the tone. Since the harmonics largely coincide, the ear usually hears a single pitch, with complex tone quality. For harpsichords, the 2′, 4′, 8′, and 16′ octaves largely exhaust the range of the instrument. For organs, a far greater variety may be possible; see Organ stop.

== Basis of the terminology ==
The particular length "eight feet" for standard pitch is based on the approximate length of an organ pipe sounding the pitch two octaves below middle C, the bottom note on an organ keyboard. This may be calculated as follows.

If a pipe is open at both ends, as is true of most organ pipes, its fundamental frequency f can be calculated (approximately) as follows:

$$f=\frac{v}{2l}$$

where

f is the fundamental frequency;
v is the speed of sound;
l is the length of the pipe.

If v is assumed to be 343 m/s (the speed of sound at sea level, with temperature of 20 °C), and the pipe length l is assumed to be eight feet (2.4 m), then the formula yields the value of 70.4 hertz (Hz; cycles per second). This is not far from the pitch of the C two octaves below 440 Hz, which (when concert pitch is set at A = 440 Hz) is 65.4 Hz. The discrepancy may be related to various factors, including effects of pipe diameter, the historical differing definitions of the length of the foot, and variations in tuning prior to the setting of A = 440 Hz as the standard pitch in the 20th century.

== See also ==
- Pipe organ – Wind instrument controlled by keyboard
- Organ stop – Pipe organ component which admits pressurized air to the pipes
- Harpsichord – Plucked-string keyboard instrument
- Acoustic resonance – Resonance phenomena in sound and musical devices
