= Gräbner (harpsichord makers) =

German family of harpsichord makers

The Gräbner family were German harpsichord-, clavichord-, organ- and eventually piano makers from the 17th century to the beginning of the 19th century. They are best known for their harpsichords, which represent a mid-german style of building, distinct from the better known northern style as represented by Hass, Mietke and Zell. The Gräbner family ran the most prominent instrument making workshop in Dresden, and were purveyors of harpsichords and organs to the court of Saxony. J.S. Bach was aquatinted with members of the Gräbner family and Christian Heinrich Gräbner studied organ playing under Bach.

== Surviving instruments ==
There are four surviving harpsichords bearing the name of Gräbner, as well as a handful of clavichords. The harpsichords are all double manual instruments, 2x8', 1x4', shove coupler and buff stop. All have a mitred tail, as opposed to a rounded one favoured by builders in Berlin and Hamburg. They all have an unusual non-pythagorean scale that is longer in the tenor than it is in the treble.

- 1722 by Johann Heinrich the elder Gräbner, preserved at the Bertramka Mozart museum in Prague. This instrument is probably somewhat modified from its original state. It is now painted white with gold trimmings and a red inside lid, but seems to have been dark green originally. It stands on a very ornate, gilded cabriole stand, that is not original. The cheek pieces have been cut on slant, which is a departure from other known instruments of the Gräbner family and is probably a later modification. It has been claimed that this instrument was used by W.A. Mozart during his stay in Prague for the production of Don Giovanni in 1787, as it belonged to František Xaver Dušek a friend and benefactor of Mozarts in Prague. There is regreattably no documentation to substantiate this claim.
- 1739 by Johann Heinrich Gräbner, probably the younger. It is preserved at the Kunstgewerbemuseum in Dresden. It has an unusual compass of DD-D3, a third lower than the more common FF-f3. Its case is painted a deep green.
- 1774 by Johann Heinrich Gräbner, the younger, preserved at Music instrument museum of the University of Leipzig. It has a compass of FF-f3
- 1782 by Karl August Gräbner, preserved at Germanisches Nationalmuseum in Nuremberg. This is a plain instrument, finished in stained wood with a compass of FF-f3.

== Noteworthy members of the family ==
The following family members were known instrument makers or players:

Johann Christoph Gräbner (unknown), builder of organs and harpsichords.

Joahnn Chistian Gräbner (fl. 1678-1704), son Johann Christoph, builder of organs and harpsichords.
Johann Heinrich Gräbner the elder (1665-1739), son of Joahnn Chistoph, builder of organs and harpsichords. Survived by one instrument dated 1722

Christian Heinrich Gräbner (1704-1769), son of Johann Christian the elder, organist and composer, studied under J.S. Bach in Leipzig.
Johann Christian Gräbner the younger (c.1700-1777), son of Johann Christian the elder, builder of organs and harpsichords. Survived by two instruments dated 1739 and 1774.

Ernst Gottlob Gräbner (1734-1759), son of Johann Christian the younger, builder of organs and harpsichords.
Johann Gottfried Gräbner (1736-1808), son of Johann Christian the younger, builder of organs, harpsichords and fortepianos
Johann Wilhelm Gräbner (1737-1795), son of Johann Christian the younger, builder of organs, harpsichords and fortepianos.
Karl August Gräbner (1737-1795), son of Johann Christian the younger, builder of organs, harpsichords and fortepianos. Survived by one harpsichord dated 1782.

== See also ==
- List of historical harpsichord makers
