= Maud Russell =

Maud Russell may refer to

- Maud Russell (social worker) (1893–1989), American social worker, educator, and writer active in China
- Maud Julia Augusta Russell (1891–1982), British socialite and art patron
- Maud Russell, mother of harpsichordist and organologist Raymond Russell who donated the Russell Collection to the Musical Instrument Museums, University of Edinburgh

== See also ==
- Maud Russell England (1863–1956), New Zealand teacher, feminist, educationalist and art dealer
- Maud Russell Lorraine Sharpe (1867–1949), American socialite, designer, and animal rights and vegetarianism activist
