= Hieronymus Albrecht Hass =

Harpsichord maker

Hieronymus Albrecht Hass (variants Haas, Hasse, Hase, Hasch) (1 December 1689 – 19 June 1752) (dates of baptism and burial) was a German harpsichord and clavichord maker. He was the father of Johann Adolph Hass, who also made harpsichords and clavichords.

== Life ==
He received Hamburg citizenship on 2 October 1711, and was born and died there. In 1713 he was described as Instrumentenmacher and Clavirmacher on his son's birth certificate. The latest known instruments by him are two unfretted clavichords, dated 1744; a Clavicimbel for Duke Friedrich Carl von Plön was delivered the same year.

The first recorded reference to his family was in 1758, when Adlung described 'Hasse in Hamburg' as the maker of a cembal d'amour. Later, in 1773, English music historian Charles Burney noted 'Hasse, father and son, both dead' as German organ builders, and that 'their Flügel and Claviere are much sought after'.

== Instruments ==
Of the Hass family instruments, Frank Hubbard wrote that 'only one has what could be regarded as a normal disposition.' Their surviving harpsichords show an attempt to develop the instrument in a number of ways: one from 1721 is 2.58 m long, and one from 1723 has the unusual disposition 8' 8' 8' 4'. Hass occasionally used a 16' set of strings (an octave below standard 8' pitch) and a 2' set (2 octaves higher than 8' pitch) for part of the keyboard.

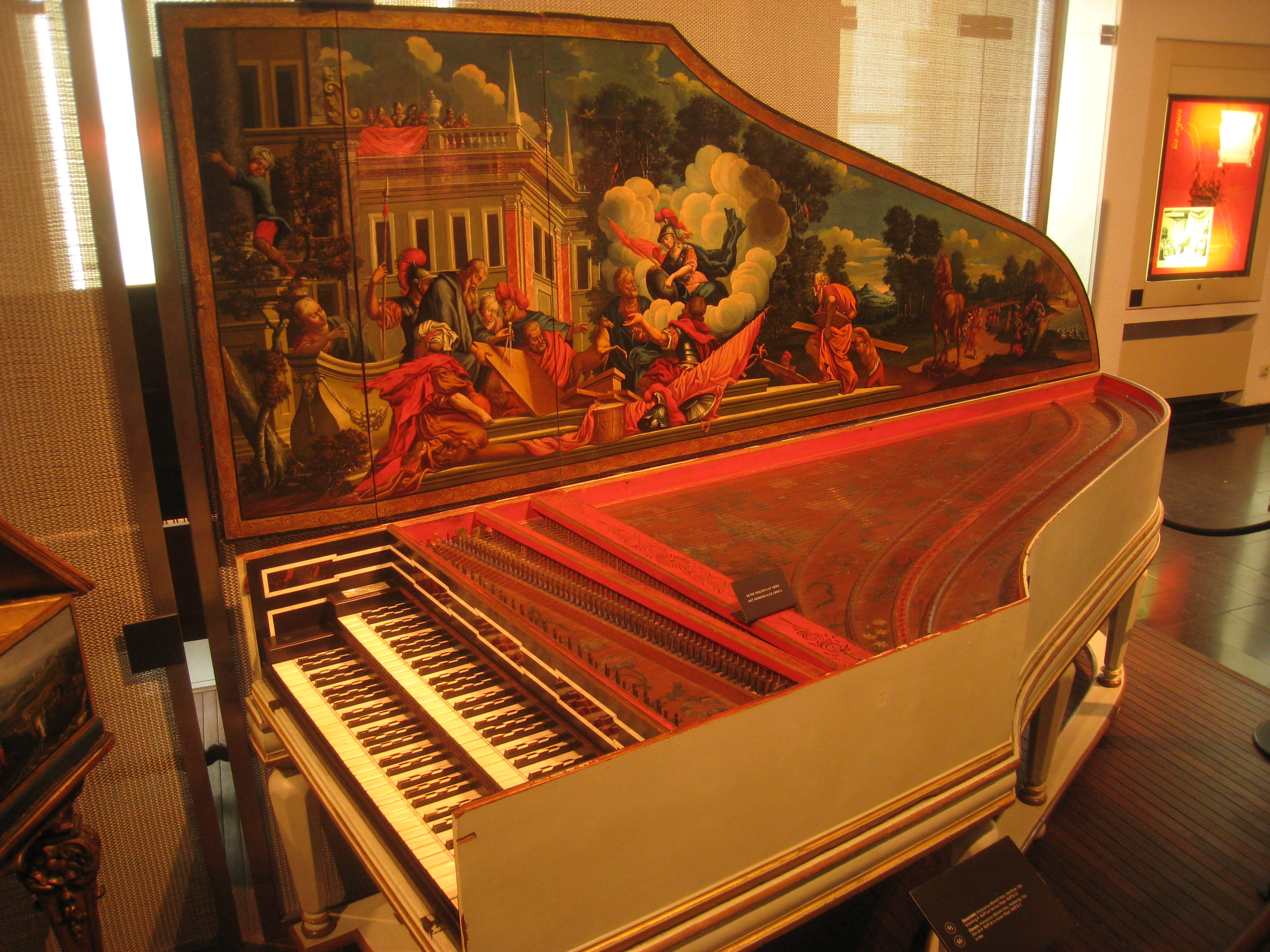
1734 harpsichord by Hieronymus Albrecht Hass, now in the Musical Instrument Museum in Brussels

The instrument shown above, which is nine feet long, illustrates the way in which Hass included the 16-foot stop in his instruments. The 16-foot bridge is seen closest to the bentside, on a separate, slightly raised section of soundboard. To its left are (in succession) the 8-foot hitchpin rail (resting on an internal bentside, not visible), the 8-foot bridge, and the 4-foot bridge.

Hass was the maker of the largest known harpsichord to have been made before the 20th century: built in 1740, it has three manuals with couplers, five sets of strings (16' 8' 8' 4' 2'), six rows of jacks, a lute stop and harp stop for the 16'. This instrument was owned by Rafael Puyana; a copy was made by Robert Goble & Son and used by Trevor Pinnock in Poulenc's Concert champêtre.

== Assessment ==
Raymond Russell wrote of Hass and his son that the 'extent and quality of their surviving work must place them first in German instrument making.' Hubbard (1965, 191) held a very mixed view: "The Hass instruments, superb technical achievements, strike us as the grotesque result of the barbarous imposition of tonal concepts appropriate to the organ on the unresisting but equally unresponsive harpsichord."
