= Boris Anrep =

Russian artist (1883–1969)

- Борис Анреп
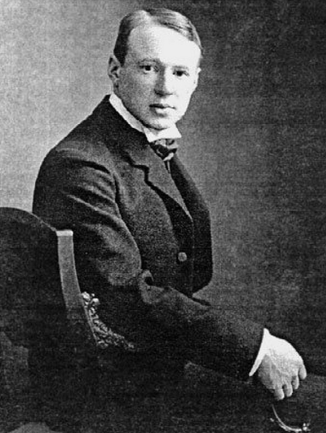
- Anrep, c. 1919
- Born: Boris Vasilyevich Anrep; 27 September 1883; Saint Petersburg, Russia
- Died: 7 June 1969 (aged 85); London, England
- Occupation: Mosaicist
- Years active: 1908–1969
- Known for: Mosaic work in; National Gallery, London; Christ the King Cathedral; Westminster Cathedral; Bank of England
- Parents: Vassily von Anrep (father); Paraskeva Mikhaylovna fon Anrep née Zatsepina (mother)

Boris Vasilyevich Anrep (Russian: Борис Васильевич Анреп; 27 September [O.S. 15 September] 1883 – 7 June 1969) was a Russian artist, active in Britain, who devoted himself to the art of mosaic.

In Britain, he is known for his monumental mosaics at the National Gallery, London, Westminster Cathedral and the Bank of England. Being close to the Bloomsbury Group, he was a notable figure in London social and intellectual life from 1912 up to the mid-1960s. In Ireland, he is known for his mosaics at Christ the King Cathedral, Mullingar. In Russia, he is associated with the Silver Age of Russian Poetry as the addressee of many beautiful poems by Anna Akhmatova, including her Tale of the Black Ring. Anrep was also friendly with Nikolai Gumilev, an outstanding poet and Akhmatova's husband, and Nikolay Nedobrovo, a talented critic, two prominent figures of the 1910s in Saint Petersburg.

== Life and works ==
The Anrep family, originally from Westphalia, belonged to Swedish and Russian nobility and numbered a few renowned army officers in the 16th to 19th centuries.

=== Early years ===
Anrep was born in 1883 in Saint Petersburg. His father, Vasily Konstantinovich fon Anrep, professor of forensic medicine, occupied high positions in the ministries of education and of interior and was elected in 1907 to the Russian parliament, the Duma. From 1899 to 1901 Boris went to school in Kharkov, where he first met Nikolay Nedobrovo, and spent the summer of 1899 in Great Missenden, Buckinghamshire, learning English. From 1902 Anrep studied in Imperial School of Jurisprudence in St. Petersburg and graduated in 1905. The same year he met Yunia Khitrovo, whom he married three years later.

After Nedobrovo introduced him to the painter Dmitri Stelletsky, Anrep began to be interested in art. In 1908 Boris abandoned his law studies in St. Petersburg University, left for Paris to study art and enrolled at the Académie Julian (classes of J.-P. Laurens). He attended also Académie de La Palette and Académie de la Grande Chaumière. This was followed by a year at the Edinburgh College of Art in 1910–1911 (classes of F. Morley Fletcher).

While in France Anrep had become friends with the painters Henry Lamb and Augustus John, and soon he was acquainted with English artists and intellectuals, among them Lytton Strachey, Maynard Keynes, Roger Fry, and Virginia Woolf. He also fell in love with Helen Maitland, a close friend of A. John's wife Dorelia. They lived together from 1911, had two children, and married in 1918. However, the marriage was unhappy, and Helen left him to become the lifelong companion of the artist and critic Roger Fry.

In 1912, Anrep worked with the art critic Clive Bell on Roger Fry's second Post-Impressionist exhibition. He was in charge of the Russian section and presented pictures by Natalia Goncharova, Mikhail Larionov, and Nicholas Roerich.

=== Anna Akhmatova and Boris Anrep ===
Anrep wrote poetry in Russian and in English, influenced by English romantics, Percy Bysshe Shelley and William Blake. His narrative poem Fiza was read in 1913 in author's absence in St. Petersburg and gave its name to the Society of Poets, which included Anna Akhmatova, her husband Nikolay Gumilyov, and Osip Mandelstam and became the centre of Acmeism, a new trend in Russian poetry.

At the outbreak of World War I in 1914 Anrep went to serve as an officer in the Russian army and fought in Galicia till 1916. Before joining the ranks, he visited Nedobrovo in Tsarskoe Selo and was introduced to Akhmatova, who lived nearby. They met continually during Anrep's short vacations in St. Petersburg. He described their relationship as a warm friendship, but for Akhmatova it was intensely important and inspired over 30 poems, which trace the passage of their affair from her early hopes and dreams to her bitter disappointment at their parting.

In April 1917 Anrep was called back to London as Military Secretary to the Russian Government Committee and never returned to Russia. The same year, Akhmatova used a line from Fiza as an epigraph to her book White Flock. For many years, they did not communicate. Their last meeting occurred in Paris in 1965, when Akhmatova returned home after receiving the honorary degree from Oxford University, shortly before her death.

=== Early commissions in England ===
Having travelled to Italy with Stelletsky in 1904 and been enthralled by the Byzantine mosaics in Ravenna, Anrep settled on the idea of making mosaics himself.

His first success was the hall of artist Ethel Sands' house in Chelsea, London: a dark turquoise blue floor with Byzantine characters (1917) and the walls, with portraits of Lytton Strachey, his companion Dora Carrington, and Virginia Woolf in male costume (1920).

Another commission was the vestibule in 35, Upper Brook St Mayfair for Sir William Jowitt, showing Various Moments in the Life of a Lady of Fashion (1922). Lesley Jowitt was shown telephoning in bed, in her bath, and at a nightclub.

The mosaics Christus Militans and The Vision of St.John were made for the chapel at the Royal Military Academy Sandhurst (1921). Eight panels, illustrating "The Proverbs of Hell" from The Marriage of Heaven and Hell by William Blake, decorated the octagonal room at the Tate Gallery (1923).

=== Saint Sophia Cathedral ===
In 1926 the trustees of Saint Sophia, Bayswater commissioned Anrep to execute a major set of mosaics in the sanctuary of the Greek Orthodox Cathedral. He settled on a scheme depicting the incarnation of Christ and the mystery and celebration of the Eucharist. His design takes full use of its Byzantine domes. The prothesis apse vault contains a semi-circular Nativity on its ceiling, using an individual composition. The diaconal apse depicts the Hospitality of Abraham from the Old Testament. At the summit of the vault are trios of angels celebrating the chalice of the Eucharist. The figures are simplified with rigid folds in Byzantine style. Gold tesserae sparkle between blocks of colour. The mosaic is harmonious with the structure, designed by Barry in the 1880s.

Anrep was invited back to decorate further sections of the cathedral between 1932 and 1956. This includes full length figures of the Major Prophets and busts of the Minor Prophets. In the west arch he depicted Saint Nicholas and Saint Christopher with the Christ Child, both protectors of the seafarers and travellers of the congregation, a community that was closely associated with shipping and trading.

=== Commissions in Mullingar, Ireland ===
Boris Anrep also realised two attractive mosaics of Saint Anne and Saint Patrick within the Cathedral of Christ the King Mullingar. The cathedral was realised from 1933 to 1939 by Byrne and sons, decorative work was subcontracted to Oppenheimer Ltd, Old Trafford, Manchester. Note carefully the unconventional spelling of Saint Anne in the mosaic; it is spelt Anna. Additionally, the saint's image bears an uncanny resemblance to that of the poet Anna Akhmatova in her mid-20s.

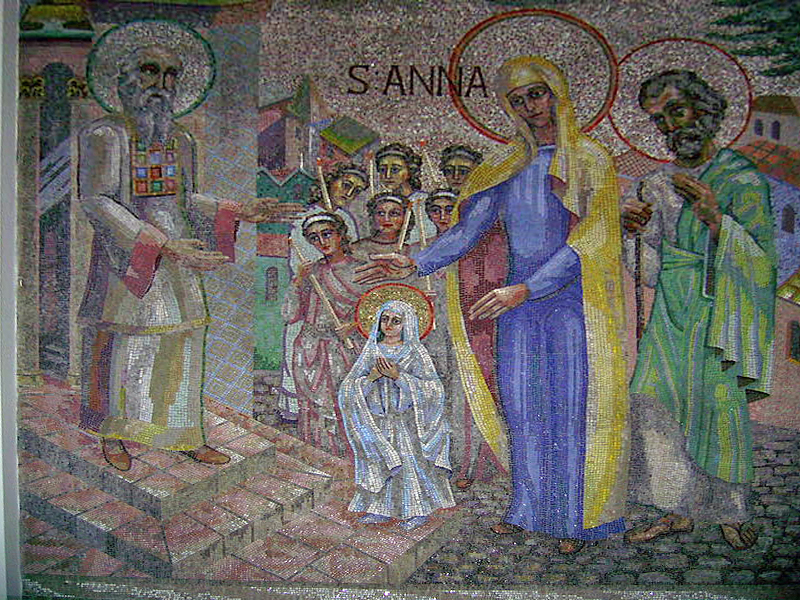
St Anne Mosaic, Marian Year 1954, by Boris Anrep, Cathedral of Christ the King, Mullingar

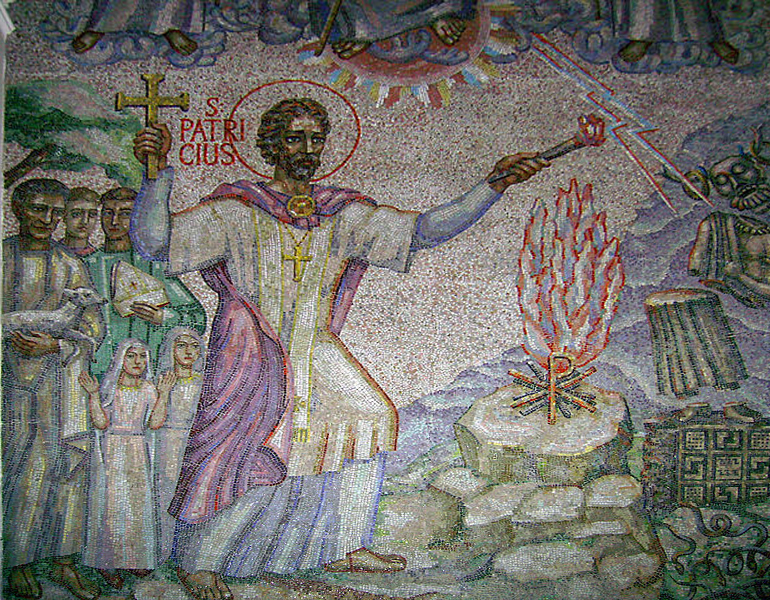
St Patrick, Pascal Fire Hill of Slane, Cathedral of Christ the King, Mullingar

=== National Gallery mosaics (1928–1952) ===
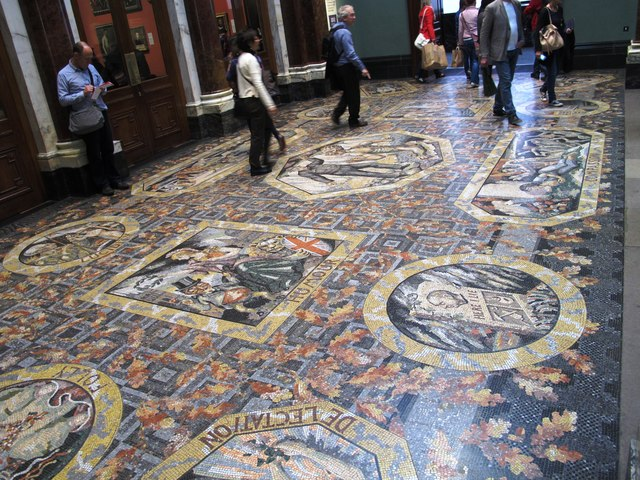
Modern Virtues, 1952

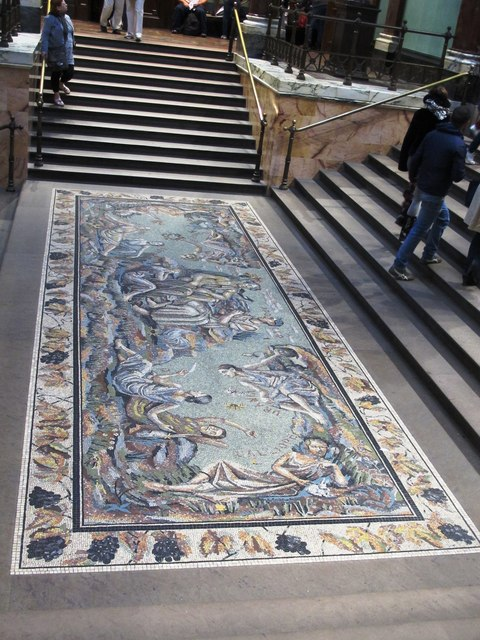
The Awakening of the Muses, 1933, in the vestibule of the National Gallery

Anrep created four colourful mosaics, which decorate the imposing staircase built by Sir John Taylor in 1887 for the entrance hall of the National Gallery. The mosaics were paid for by private patrons, mainly the industrialist Samuel Courtauld and Anrep's friend Maud Russell, wife of the banker Gilbert Russell. Anrep described the subjects as a philosophical cycle.

The Labours of Life in the west vestibule (1928) illustrates Man's constructive and creative nature. It includes working with electric drill (Engineering), filming a zebra (Exploring), washing a pig (Farming) and studying the diplodocus in the Natural History Museum (Science). Other pictures are Sacred Love (a family), Art, Astronomy, Letters, Mining, Commerce (a Covent Garden porter), Music (a shell and a flute), and Theatre (a contortionist).

The Pleasures of Life in the east vestibule (1929) shows Man's recreations. The subjects are Contemplation, Conversation, Football, Hunting, Cricket. Girls are depicted riding a motorcycle (Speed), wriggling in a hammock (Rest), jiving charleston (Dance), swimming (Sea-Horse). Christmas Pudding and Mud Pie are childish, while Profane Love shows a man with two girls.

The Awakening of the Muses on the half-way landing (1933) links the themes of the first two mosaics. At the crowing of the cock Bacchus, patron of pleasures, and Apollo, who inspires the labours, awaken the Muses. Here the figures are portraits of the artist's contemporaries. Apollo is Sir Osbert Sitwell, Bacchus is Clive Bell. Polyhymnia is represented as Diana Mitford, Clio as Virginia Woolf. Melpomene is Greta Garbo, and Terpsichore is prima ballerina Lydia Lopokova, Lady Keynes. Euterpe as Lady Christabel Aberconway. Urania as Maria Volkova. Calliope as Anna Akhmatova. Erato as Mary Hutchinson. Thalia as Lady Lesley Jowitt.

Modern Virtues in the north vestibule (1952) is a record of the intellectual life of the 1930s and 1940s. Compromise is presented by the American actress Loretta Young, wearing a Phrygian cap as well as a crown; Curiosity is Lord Rutherford with a splitting atom; Sir Winston Churchill defies a beast in a shape of swastika (Defiance). The ballerina Margot Fonteyn listens to the writer and musician Hon. Edward Sackville-West playing the harpsichord (Delectation); Lady Diana Cooper as Britannia crowns Punch (Humour); the poet T. S. Eliot features in Leisure, Bertrand Russell illustrates Lucidity. The astronomer Fred Hoyle, Augustus John and the poet Edith Sitwell and are portrayed respectively in Pursuit, Wonder and Sixth Sense (named after the poem by Gumilyov). Compassion is a portrait of Akhmatova surrounded by the horrors of war. She is looking towards another panel which depicts Anrep's gravestone, linking together his art and her poetry.

== Mosaics ==
- 1912 Three mosaic panels made at the Ebel Factory, Paris.
- 1914 Westminster Cathedral crypt. Ceiling of Tomb for Archbishop.
- 1914 The Vale, Chelsea. Hall, floor with Byzantine figures at a party. Deep turquoise background, strong figures.
- 1918 The Vale, Chelsea. E.Sands. Walls. V.Woolf with her head in the stars, coming down steps. L.Strachey looking out of the cottage window. D.Carrington looking up at him from lower window. Tree and parrot in cage, cryptic poem in Russian. Sketched in the plaster with mosaic.
- 1919 Mallord Street, Chelsea. Fireplace in vestibule for A.John. Mistresses, Wives and Children. Now in Victoria and Albert Museum.
- 1920 Westminster Cathedral. Blessed Oliver Plunkett.
- 1921 Royal Military College, Sandhurst. Apse of the chapel. St John with keys, sword and stars.

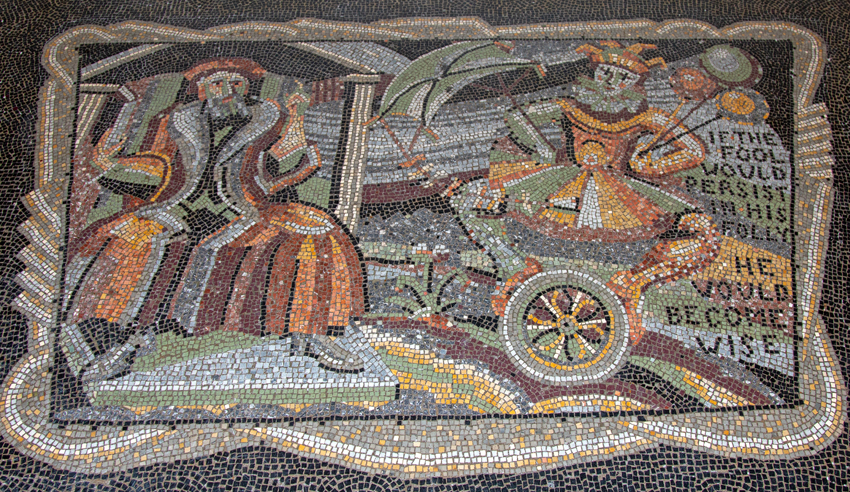
Mosaic for the Blake room, Tate Britain, 1923

- 1923 Tate Gallery. Octagonal floor of the Blake Room. Blake proverbs from 'The Marriage of Heaven and Hell': eight plaques.
- 1923 Chapel Keir House. General Stirling. Ceiling.
- 1923 Upper Brook St. London. William and Lesley Jowitt, Floor of hall. Various moments in the life of a Modern Lady of Fashion. Now in Birmingham Art Gallery. Lady J, telephoning in bed, in her bath, at nightclub, etc.
- 1925 Hamspray House, Wiltshire. Mantelpiece with Carrington lying prone across the top as a hermaphrodite. For L.Strachey. Now in Brighton Museum storage?
- 1924–28 St Sophia, Greek Orthodox Church, Moscow Rd. Ceiling and walls. Prophets.
- 1928 West vestibule. East vestibule 1929. The Labours of Life and The Pleasures of Life.
- 1930? Mosaic of Lovers. Jeanne Reynal. Given to his son Igor Anrep (born 1914)
- 1931 Gazebo, Biddesden House, Wiltshire. Bryan Guinness. Floor, walls and domed ceiling. Floral designs and 3 Muses in alcoves.
- 1931 Bank of England. Floors. Coins of the Realm.
- 1932 Greek Cathedral, Moscow Rd. Ceilings and walls.
- 1933 National Gallery. Half landing Awakening of the Muses. Clive Bell as Bacchus, Greta Garbo, Lopokova, R. Partridge as Apollo.
- 1933 Mantelpiece for Hamspray. R. and F. Partridge. Shells. Whereabouts now unknown.
- 1937–42-57 Bank of England, Threadneedle St. Hall, passages.
- 1945 The Sacred Heart for Mrs Stirling. Left to Ampleforth by her in 1972.

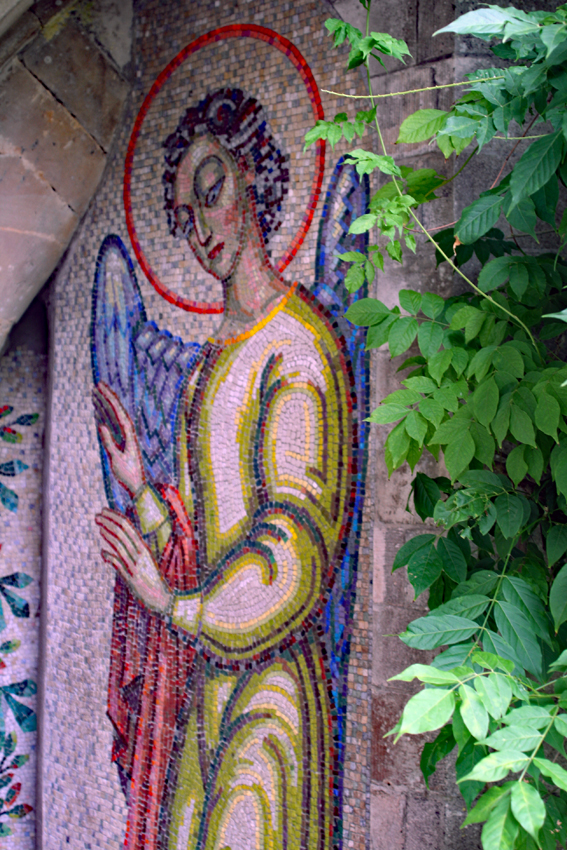
Maud Russell Angel mosaic at Mottisfont Abbey, 1946

- 1946 Wall of Mottisfont Abbey. Romsey. Maud Russell Angel of Mottisfont.
- 1948 Mullingar Cathedral, Ireland. St Patrick lighting the fire at Slane, St Patrick's chapel.
- 1950 Greek Cathedral.
- 1952 National Gallery. North vestibule, 'Modern Virtues' Akhmatova, Fonteyn, Rutherford, Eliot, Russel, E. Sitwell and A. John, Churchill etc., figure as virtues.
- 1953 Hendon Vale Cemetery. Tomb for Greek shipowner, Mr Kulukundis.
- 1954 Mullingar Cathedral, Ireland. St Anne's chapel.
- 1954 Notre Dame de France, Leicester Sq. Madonna leaning over Child in Manger. Altar panel later plastered up for design by Cocteau.
- 1956–57 Bank of England. Annex in New Change, Queen Elizabeth II.
- 1956–63 Westminster Cathedral. Chapel of the Blessed Sacrament. Walls and ceiling.
- 1962 Halkin St, London. Fireplace. Black cat for Mrs Partridge.
- 1965 Table with four panels: ballet shoes, heart being dissected, writing paper and stethoscope.

== Writings ==
- The Book of Anrep (lost), Foreword to The Book of Anrep
- Escape from Paris
- About the Black Ring
- Foreword to Russian section of Post-Impressionist catalogue
- Articles in Apollon
- Poems

== Illustrations and paintings ==
- 1906 Maroussia Volkova (charcoal on paper)
- 1934–35 Mrs Gilbert Russell, Sitting in Bed (oil)
- 1944, Nude and Ruins (gouache on board)
- Design for mosaic (multiple) See: Prints & Drawings Study Room at the V&A
- Cartoon for mosaic (multiple) See: Prints & Drawings Study Room at the V&A
- Foreword to the Book of Anrep (water colour)
- Helen Anrep (drawing)
- Music Teacher (drawing) Tate Gallery
- The Lady and the Tree (gouache)
- Study for National Gallery mosaic "Rest" (drawing)
- Head of Girl (drawing)
- Head of Man (drawing)
- Cartoons for mosaics (Victoria and Albert Museum)
- Green Man (oil)
