= Ray Russell =

Ray Russell may refer to:

- Ray Russell (writer)
- Ray Russell (musician)
- Carl Ray Russell, American politician

== See also ==
- Raymond Russell (disambiguation)
