= Raymond Russell (organologist) =

British organologist and antiquarian

- Born: Raymond Anthony Russell; 27 May 1922; London, England
- Died: 17 March 1964 (aged 41); Crown Colony of Malta
- Occupation: organologist
- Known for: the Russell Collection; The Harpsichord and Clavichord
- Parents: Gilbert Russell (father); Maud Julia Augusta Russell (mother)

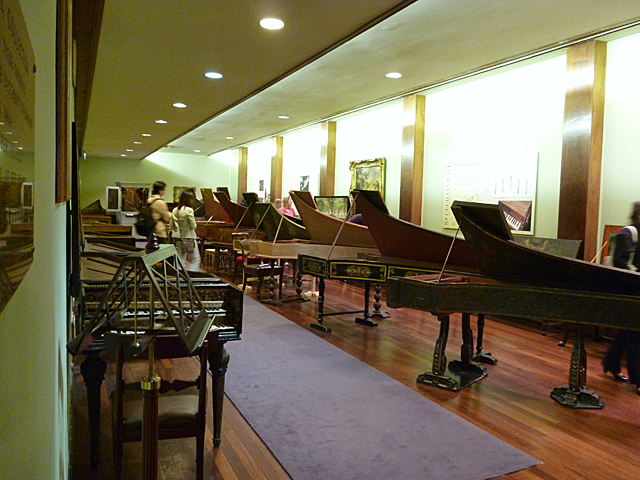
Instruments from Russell's collection in St Cecilia's Hall, Edinburgh

Raymond Anthony Russell, FSA FRHistS, (27 May 1922 – 17 March 1964) was a British organologist and antiquarian. He was an expert on early keyboard instruments, and assembled an important collection which now forms the Raymond Russell Collection of Early Keyboard Instruments of the University of Edinburgh.

== Life ==
Russell was born in London on 27 May 1922, the son of Gilbert Russell and his wife Maud, née Nelke. His father was from an aristocratic family related to the Dukes of Bedford, his mother a noted patron of the arts. The family was rich; from 1934 they lived at Mottisfont Abbey in Hampshire.

In the Second World War Russell initially applied for registration as a conscientious objector, and was formally exempted from combatant service, but changed his mind. He enlisted in the Royal Fusiliers, where he reached the rank of captain. He had already begun collecting keyboard instruments in 1939, before hostilities began.

Over the next twenty years he assembled a considerable collection of seventeenth- and eighteenth-century clavichords and harpsichords. His collection included instruments from all the main harpsichord-building areas of Europe: a number of English spinets; early harpsichords and virginals from Italy; Flemish instruments by the Ruckers; a late French instrument by Pascal Taskin; and a clavichord and harpsichord from North Germany, both by Johann Adolph Hass. Russell was an able harpsichordist, and became an expert organologist. He catalogued the keyboard instrument collection of the Victoria and Albert Museum, and the collection of Benton Fletcher, now in Fenton House.

In 1959 he published The Harpsichord and Clavichord: an Introductory Study, with accurate and detailed analysis and descriptions of the instruments. Russell was an early advocate of a historically-informed approach to instrument-building, based on study of surviving historical examples, and a return to traditional methods of both performance and construction. His book influenced builders such as Frank Hubbard in this direction.

Russell was also an expert on, and collector of, early treatises of medicine; towards the end of his life, he researched the antiquities of the island of Malta.

== The Russell Collection ==
By 1960 Russell had decided to donate his collection to Edinburgh University, where it was to become the nucleus of a centre for research in keyboard performance practice and organology, but this plan was not completed by the time of his death. He died in Malta on 17 March 1964. In 1968, in his memory and in accordance with his wishes, his mother donated almost all his collection to the university, which later bought two more of his instruments; the donation also included his notes and his collection of documentary photographs. The twenty-one instruments constitute the Raymond Russell Collection of Early Keyboard Instruments, which is housed in St Cecilia's Hall in Edinburgh.
