= Raymond Russell =

Raymond Russell may refer to:

- Raymond Russell (actor) (1887–1918), American silent film actor
- Raymond Russell (organologist) (1922–1964), British organologist
- Raymond Russell (boxer), American boxer
- Raymond Russell (golfer), Scottish golfer
