= Maud Julia Augusta Russell =

British socialite and art patron

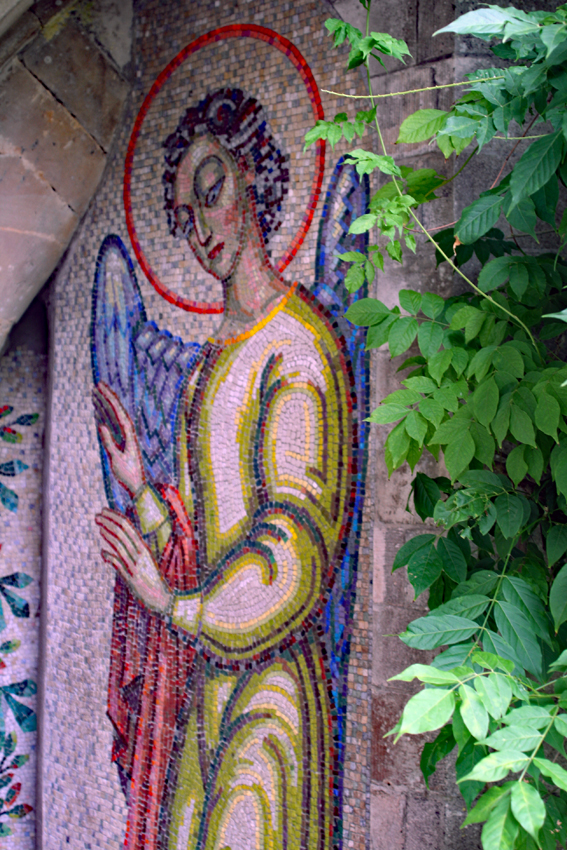
- Angel mosaic by Boris Anrep, with the face of Maud Russell, his patron. In an outdoor niche at Mottisfont Abbey.
- Born: Maud Julia Augusta Nelke; 7 November 1891; Chelsea, London, England
- Died: 27 May 1982 (aged 90)
- Spouse: Gilbert Russell (m. 1917; died 1942)
- Children: Martin Russell 1918-2003; Raymond Anthony Russell 1922-1964

Maud Julia Augusta Russell (née Nelke; 7 November 1891 – 27 May 1982}) was a British socialite and art patron, who aided Jewish relatives in their escape from Nazi Germany during the 1930s.

== Family ==
The daughter of Maria and Paul Nelke, German Jewish immigrants, Maud grew up in London in the late 1800s and early 1900s. In 1917, she married Gilbert Byng Alwyne Russell, a lieutenant in the Grenadier Guards. Maud's father, Paul Nelke, later helped Gilbert create the merchant banking firm Cull & Company. They had two sons; Martin Basil Paul Russell, eccentric banker, collector and a patron of Sri Lankan Cubism (1918-2003) and Raymond Anthony Russell. When Gilbert died in 1942 she wrote in her diary: "The main, the fullest, the richest and the most feeling part of life ended with him"

== War diaries ==
Maud was an avid reader and maintained a written diary throughout her life. Her diaries, uncovered and published, provide a record of the development of the war from Maud's perspective.

"She was unfortunate enough to live through both World Wars, suffering from anti-German sentiment during the Great War and helping her Jewish relations to escape Germany in the 1930s. From 1943-1945 she worked on secret propaganda activities at the Admiralty"

== Art and architecture ==
Maud remains one of the foremost English collectors of modern French art, and enjoyed a friendship with artists such as Boris Anrep of whom she was patron and eventually executrix of his will. Maud was one of the patrons for Boris Anrep's Modern Virtues, a collection of colourful mosaics which decorate the imposing staircase built by Sir John Taylor in 1887 for the entrance hall of the National Gallery, her name and portrait are expressed as the personification of Folly. Rex Whistler was another, who painted the namesake Whistler Drawing Room at Mottisfont in his famous trompe-l'œil style. She also shared a particularly close relationship with Ian Fleming, to whom she notably gave a gunmetal-finished, gold cigarette case which is thought to have been the inspiration for Red Grant's "oval gold cigarette case" in From Russia with Love. Fleming had also worked at Cull & Company.

Maud and Gilbert bought Mottisfont Abbey in 1934, and remodelled it from a building in ruin to a modern estate with the help of her artist friends. In 1957, she gave the house and grounds to the National Trust but continued to live at Mottisfont until 1972. It was nominated a Grade I listed building in 1957, with the 1938-9 Rex Whistler drawing room a named feature of the listing.

=== Portraits ===
- c.1914 Miss Maude Nelke (Oil on canvas). Sir William Nicholson (English, 1872–1949). Ferens Art Gallery
- Date Unknown (pencil) John Singer Sargent
- Date Unknown, Maud as a young woman (Oil on canvas). Ambrose McEvoy. Private Collection
- Early 1930s, (Photograph) Cecil Beaton for Vogue Magazine
- c. 1934-35 Mrs Gilbert Russell, Sitting in Bed (Oil on canvas). Boris Anrep (Russian, 1883–1969). V&A Museum
- 1937, (Charcoal drawing) Henri Matisse (French, 1869–54)
- 1946 Maud Russell Angel of Mottisfont (Mosaic) Boris Anrep (Russian, 1883–1969). Mottisfont Abbey
- 1952 Folly, (Mosaic) Boris Anrep (Russian, 1883–1969) National Gallery.
- Date Unknown Maud Russell (Drawing) Derek Hill (British, 1916–2000) Mottisfont, Hampshire (Accredited Museum)

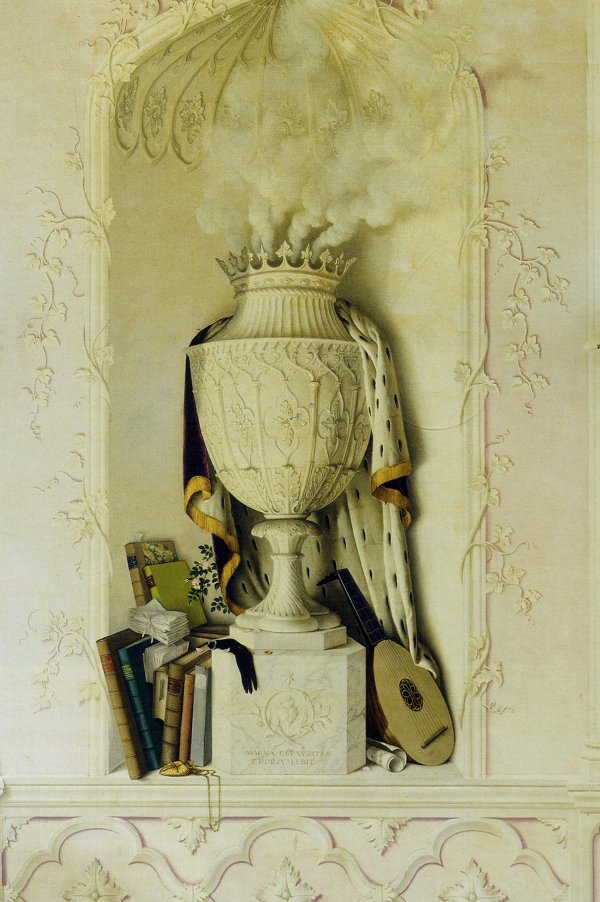
1938-9, Trompe-l'œil at Mottisfont Abbey, Rex Whistler

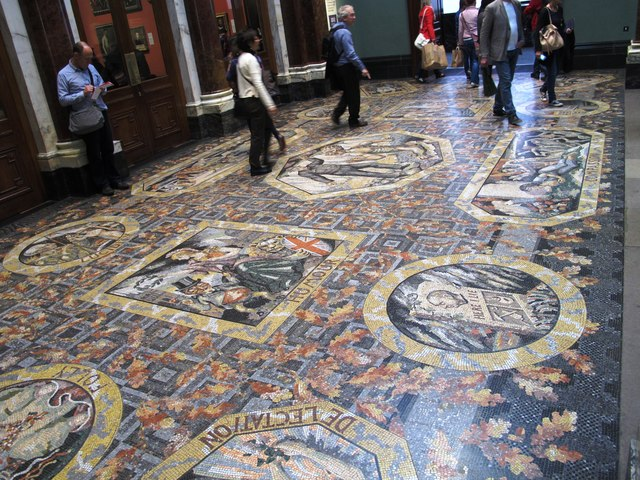
1952, National Gallery 'Modern Virtues' by Boris Anrep

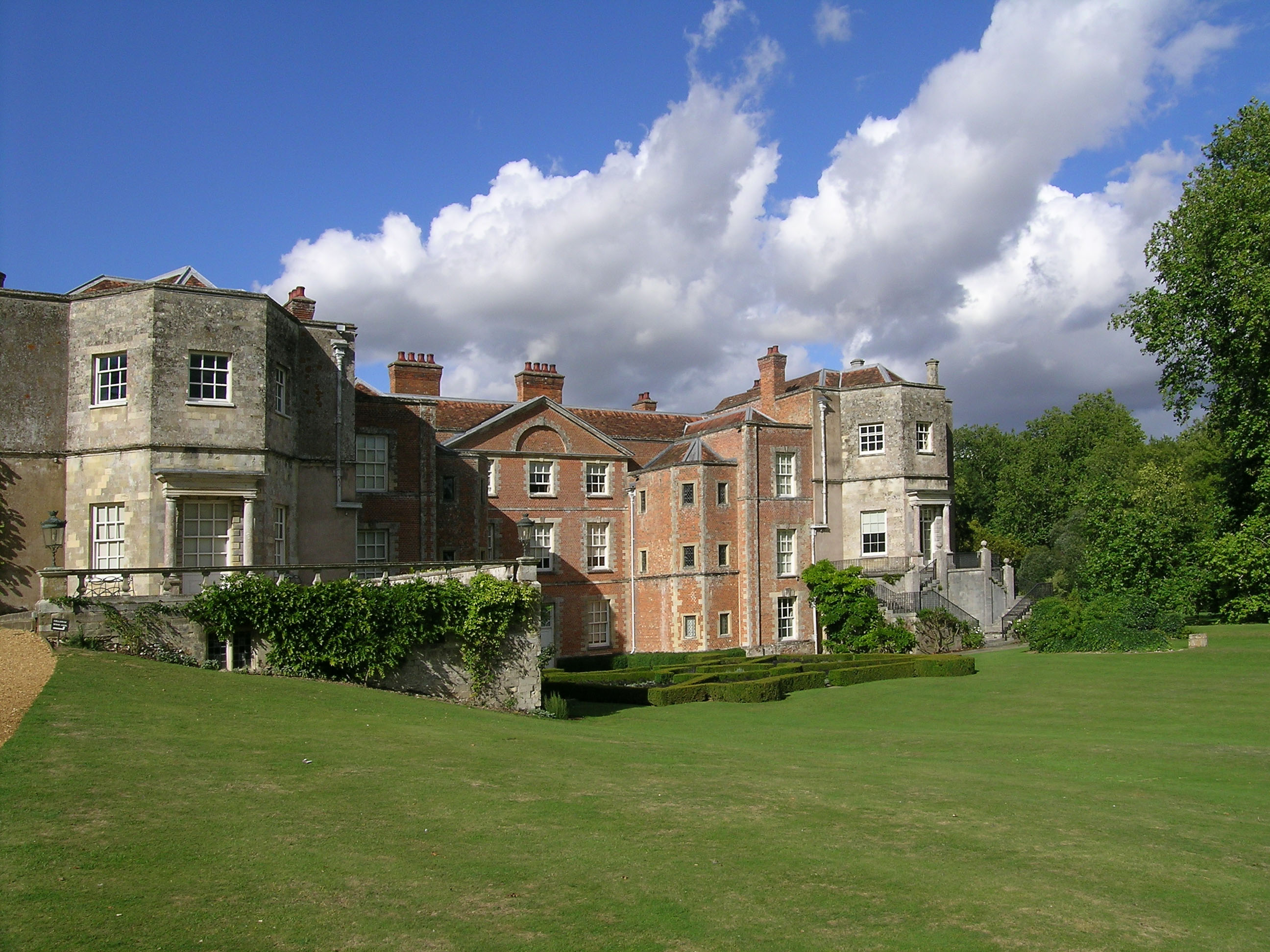
Mottisfont Abbey, Maud's home with husband Gilbert

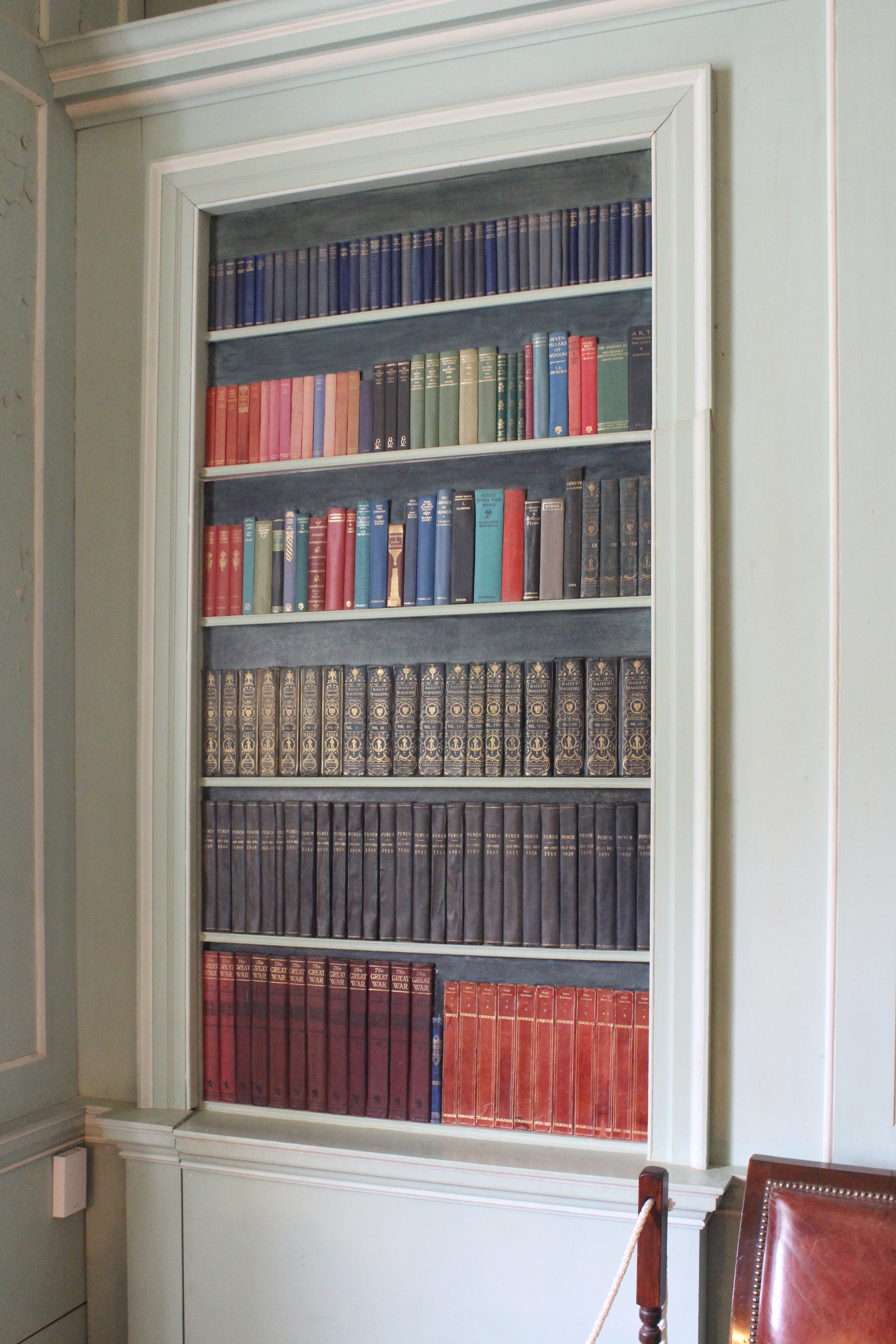
The secret door at Mottisfont

== Bibliography ==
- Russell, Maud (2017). Russell, Emily (ed.). A Constant Heart: The War Diaries of Maud Russell, 1938-1945. The Dovecote Press. ISBN 978-0995546233.
- Pile, Jonathan (2012). Churchill's Secret Enemy. Jonathan Pile. ISBN 978-1-4716-4180-0.
