= Christian Zell =

German harpsichord maker (c. 1683 – 1763)

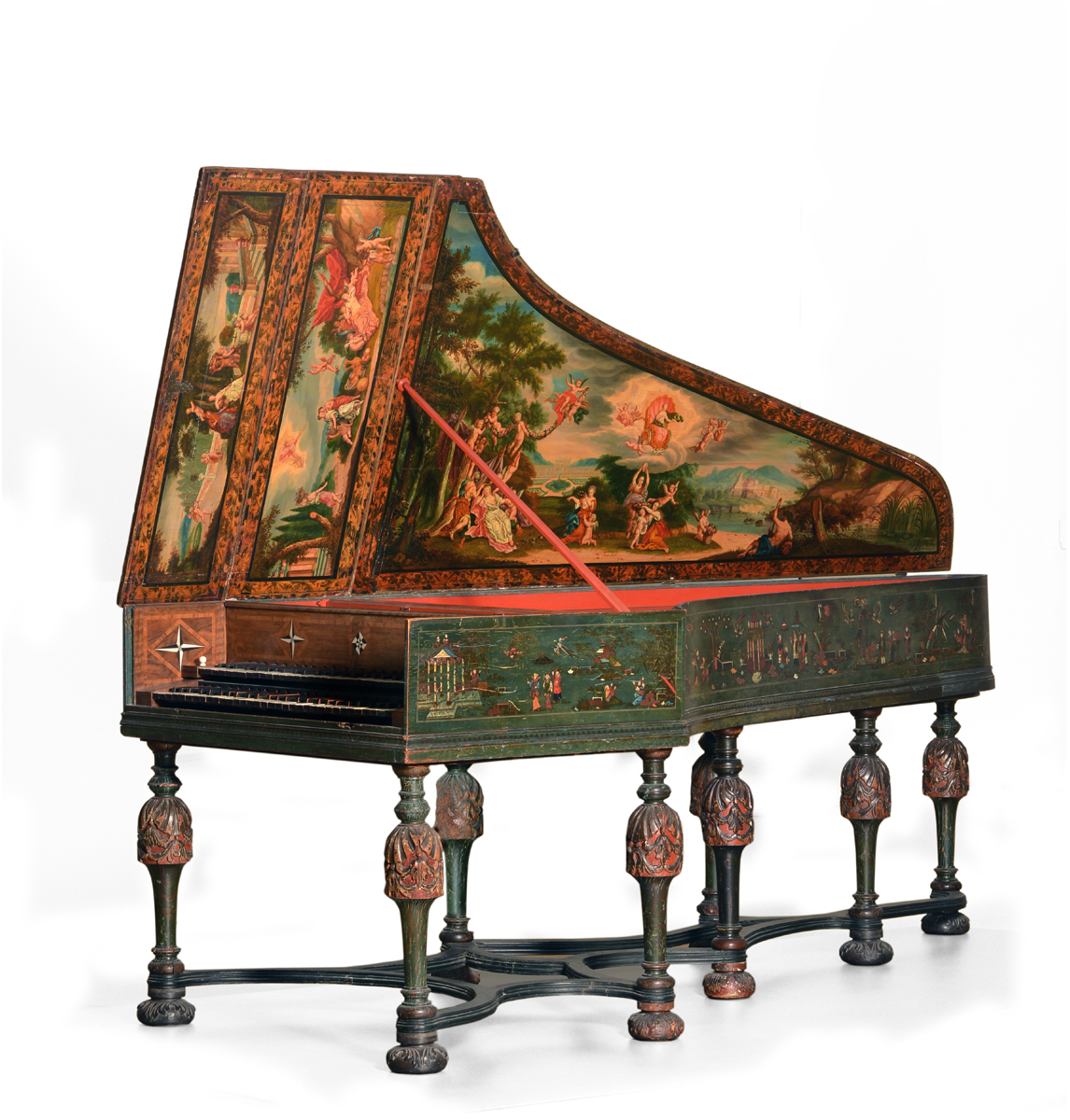
Zell harpsichord (Hamburg, 1728)

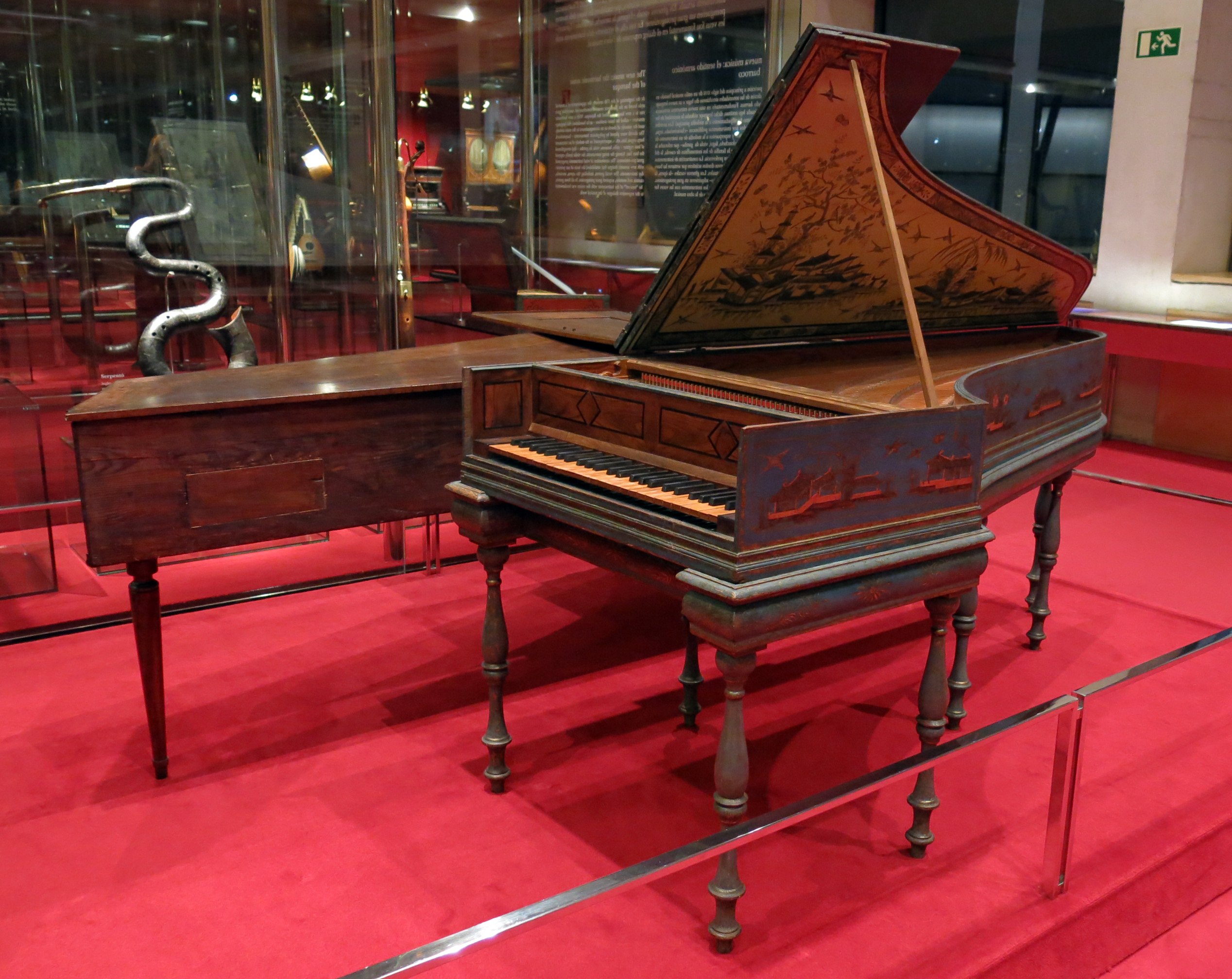
Zell harpsichord in Museu de la Música de Barcelona

Christian Zell (or Zelle) (c. 1683 – 13 April 1763) was a German harpsichord maker.

It has been suggested that he awas a pupil of harpsichord maker Michael Mietke. It is perhaps more likely, however, that he trained in Hamburg, where he where the first mention of him is in 1722 in the register of citizens. Hamburg was certainly the city where he was to spend the rest of his life. Moreover, in the same year he married Florentina, widow of instrument maker Carl Conrad Fleischer, and took over his workshop. This would suggest that at least some of his training was with Fleischer.

There are three of his harpsichords surviving: a 1728 instrument in the Museum für Kunst und Gewerbe Hamburg; a 1737 instrument in the Museu de la Música de Barcelona; and a 1741 instrument in the Museum of the Organeum in Weener, Lower Saxony. They are noted for the richness of their decoration, with lacquered chinoiserie typical of Hamburg harpsichords, and most significantly, their 'matchless tone'.

The harpsichord played by American singer-songwriter Tori Amos on her 1996 album Boys For Pele and the subsequent Dew Drop Inn Tour is a replica of the 1728 Christian Zell harpsichord although without the elaborate paintings. It was made by Robert Goble & Son.

== See also ==
- List of historical harpsichord makers

== Notes and sources ==
- Alexander Pilipczuk: "Zell [Zelle], Christian", Grove Music Online ed. L. Macy (Accessed 18 May 2007), http://www.grovemusic.com/
