= Russell Collection =

British collection of keyboard instruments

Raymond Russell Collection of Early Keyboard Instruments
- Interior of the museum
- Established: 1968
- Location: St Cecilia's Hall, Niddry Street, Edinburgh
- Coordinates: 55.94903°N 3.18649°W
- Type: keyboard instrument collection
- Collection size: 21 instruments
- Website: Musical Instrument Collection website

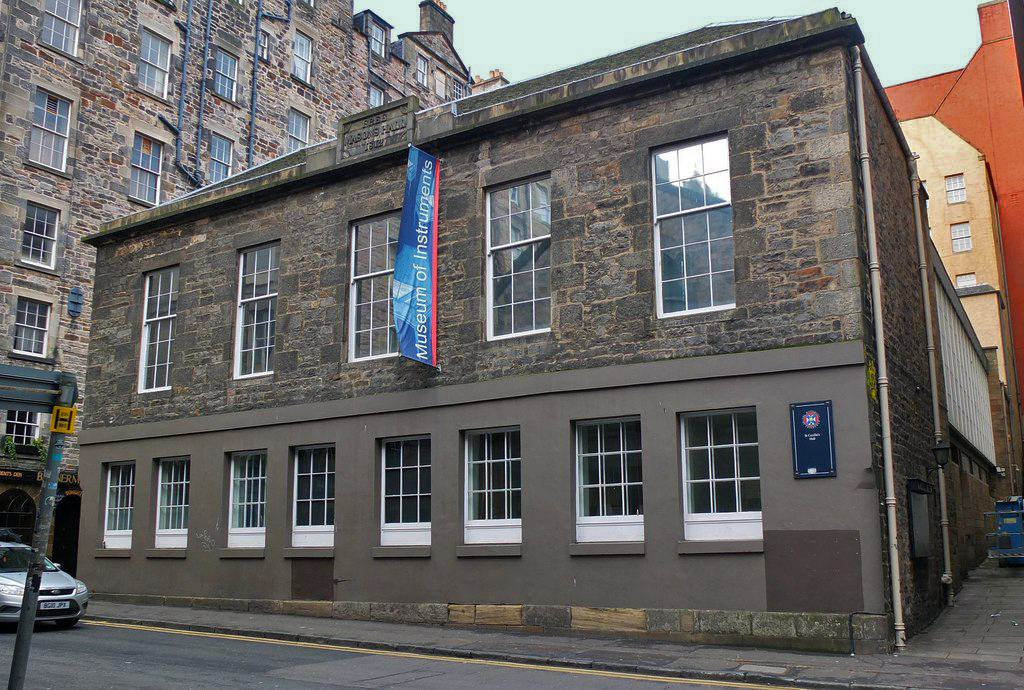
St Cecilia's Hall, Edinburgh, where the collection is housed

The Russell Collection is a substantial collection of early keyboard instruments assembled by the British harpsichordist and organologist Raymond Russell. It forms part of the Musical Instrument Museums collection of the University of Edinburgh, and is housed in St Cecilia's Hall. Its full name is the Raymond Russell Collection of Early Keyboard Instruments.

== History ==
Raymond Russell, a British harpsichordist and organologist, bought his first historic keyboard instrument in 1939. Over the next twenty years he assembled a considerable collection of seventeenth- and eighteenth-century clavichords and harpsichords. His collection included instruments from all the main harpsichord-building areas of Europe: a number of English spinets; early harpsichords and virginals from Italy; Flemish instruments by the Ruckers; a late French instrument by Pascal Taskin; and a clavichord and harpsichord from North Germany, both by Johann Adolph Hass. Russell described many of the instruments in detail in his book The Harpsichord and Clavichord: an Introductory Study, published in 1959.

By 1960 Russell had decided to donate his collection to Edinburgh University, where it was to become the nucleus of a centre for research in keyboard performance practice and organology, but this plan was not completed by the time of his sudden death in Malta in 1964 at the age of forty-one. Later that year, in his memory and in accordance with his wishes, his mother Maud Russell donated almost all of his collection – nineteen instruments – to the university; the donation also included his notes and his collection of documentary photographs. The collection was housed in St Cecilia's Hall in Edinburgh, which the university had acquired for that purpose, and which opened as a museum in 1968. The opening recital was given by Gustav Leonhardt.

The university bought two further instruments from Russell's collection – an English double harpsichord by Jacob Kirckman, bought at auction in 1970, and a French double harpsichord by Jean Goermans and Taskin, purchased from Maud Russell in 1974 – bringing the total number to twenty-one.

== Instruments ==
The instruments in the collection represent the five principal geographical areas or national schools of harpsichord-making – England, Flanders, France, the German-speaking world and the Italian peninsula – and more than two hundred years of the history of the craft.

=== England ===
English instruments in the collection include:

- a rectangular virginal made by Stephen Keene in 1668
- a hexagonal spinet attributed to John Player, made in about 1705
- a single-manual harpsichord by Thomas Hancock, made in 1720
- a walnut bentside spinet by Thomas Hitchcock, dated 1728
- a bentside spinet made in 1757 by Sir John Harrison Burnett
- a finely-decorated double-manual harpsichord by Jacob Kirckman, dating from 1755
- a Scottish bentside spinet made in Edinburgh in 1784 by Neil Stewart
- a single-manual harpsichord by John Broadwood and Sons, made in 1793.

=== Flanders ===
There are four Flemish harpsichords in the collection, all made in Antwerp:

- a double-manual harpsichord made by Andreas Ruckers the Elder in 1608
- a single-manual harpsichord by Ioannes Ruckers, dated 1637
- a double-manual transposing harpsichord, also by Ioannes Ruckers, 1638
- a single-manual harpsichord by Ioannes Couchet, made in 1645.

=== France ===
The two French instruments are:

- a double-manual harpsichord made by Jean Goermans in 1764, rebuilt by Pascal Taskin in 1783–1784, formerly the property of Arnold Dolmetsch
- a double-manual harpsichord by Taskin, made in 1769.

=== Germany ===
There are two North German instruments, both made in Hamburg by Johann Adolph Hass: an unfretted clavichord dating from 1763, and a single-manual harpsichord made in 1764. There is also a small German triple-fretted clavichord from about 1700.

=== Italy ===
Instruments from Italy include:

- a pentagonal inner-outer virginal made in 1586 by Alessandro Bertolotti
- an anonymous single-manual inner-outer harpsichord dating from about 1620
- a triple-manual harpsichord by Stefano Bolcioni, made in 1627
- an ottavino spinet made by Petrus Michael Orlandus in 1710.

== See also ==
- List of music museums
