= Mottisfont Abbey =

Grade I listed estate and former Augustinian priory in Test Valley, United Kingdom

Coordinates: 51°02′29″N 1°32′06″W

Mottisfont Priory
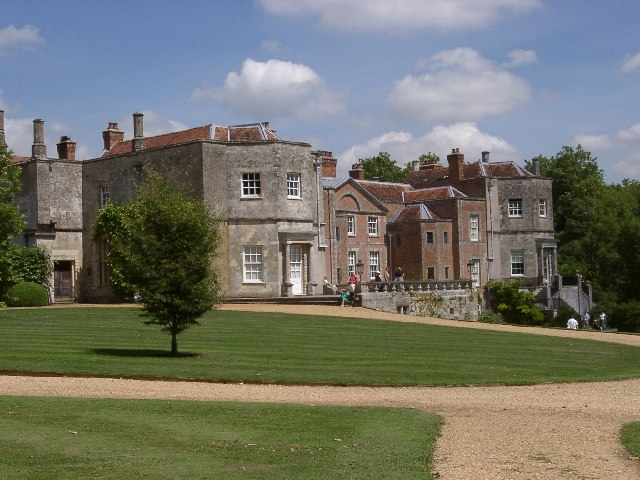
- Interactive map of Mottisfont Priory

Monastery information
- Order: Augustinian
- Established: 1201
- Disestablished: 22 May 1536
- Dedication: The Priory Church of the Holy Trinity, Mottisfont

People
- Founder: William Briwere

Site
- Location: Mottisfont, Hampshire, England
- Grid reference: SU327270
- Visible remains: parts of church, chapter house and cellarium incorporated into 18th-century mansion
- Public access: yes
- Other information: National Trust

Listed Building – Grade I
- Official name: Mottisfont Abbey House
- Designated: 29 May 1957
- Reference no.: 1093730

National Register of Historic Parks and Gardens
- Official name: Abbey, Mottisfont
- Designated: 31 May 1984
- Reference no.: 1000864

Listed Building – Grade II
- Official name: Walled garden 250 m north west of Mottisfont Abbey
- Designated: 11 April 1986
- Reference no.: 1339147

Mottisfont Abbey is a historical priory and country estate in Hampshire, England. Sheltered in the valley of the River Test, the property is now operated by the National Trust. 393,250 people visited the site in 2019. The site includes the historic house museum which features regularly changing art exhibitions, gardens, including a walled rose garden which is home to the National Plant Collection of ancestral rose species and 19th-century rose cultivars, and a riverside walk. It is a Grade I listed building.

== History ==
=== Priory ===
Fertile land and a plentiful water supply attracted the first settlers. The site's name comes from a spring ("font") that is still producing water in the grounds. It was the font around which the local community held its moots or meetings. An Augustinian priory was founded here in 1201 by William Briwere, a businessman, administrator and courtier to four Plantagenet kings who chose to make a public demonstration of his wealth and piety. The canons welcomed pilgrims en route to Winchester, who came to worship Mottisfont's relic, said to be the finger of St John the Baptist.

Struck by the Black Death, the initially prosperous priory suffered from the mid-14th century onwards. Its landholdings included the church at Berwick St James, Wiltshire.

=== House ===
During the Dissolution of the Monasteries under Henry VIII, the priory was dissolved and in 1536 the King gave Mottisfont to a favoured statesman, Sir William Sandys (died 1540), who turned it into a country home but, rather unusually, chose not to demolish the existing priory. Sandys instead turned the church nave into the main body of the new mansion, building additional wings on either side. Sections of the original medieval church may still be seen, with the later additions built around them. The 13th-century cellarium also remains present today.

In the 18th century, the old monastic cloisters and Tudor courtyard were demolished by the Mill family, creating the modern appearance of the house's facade.

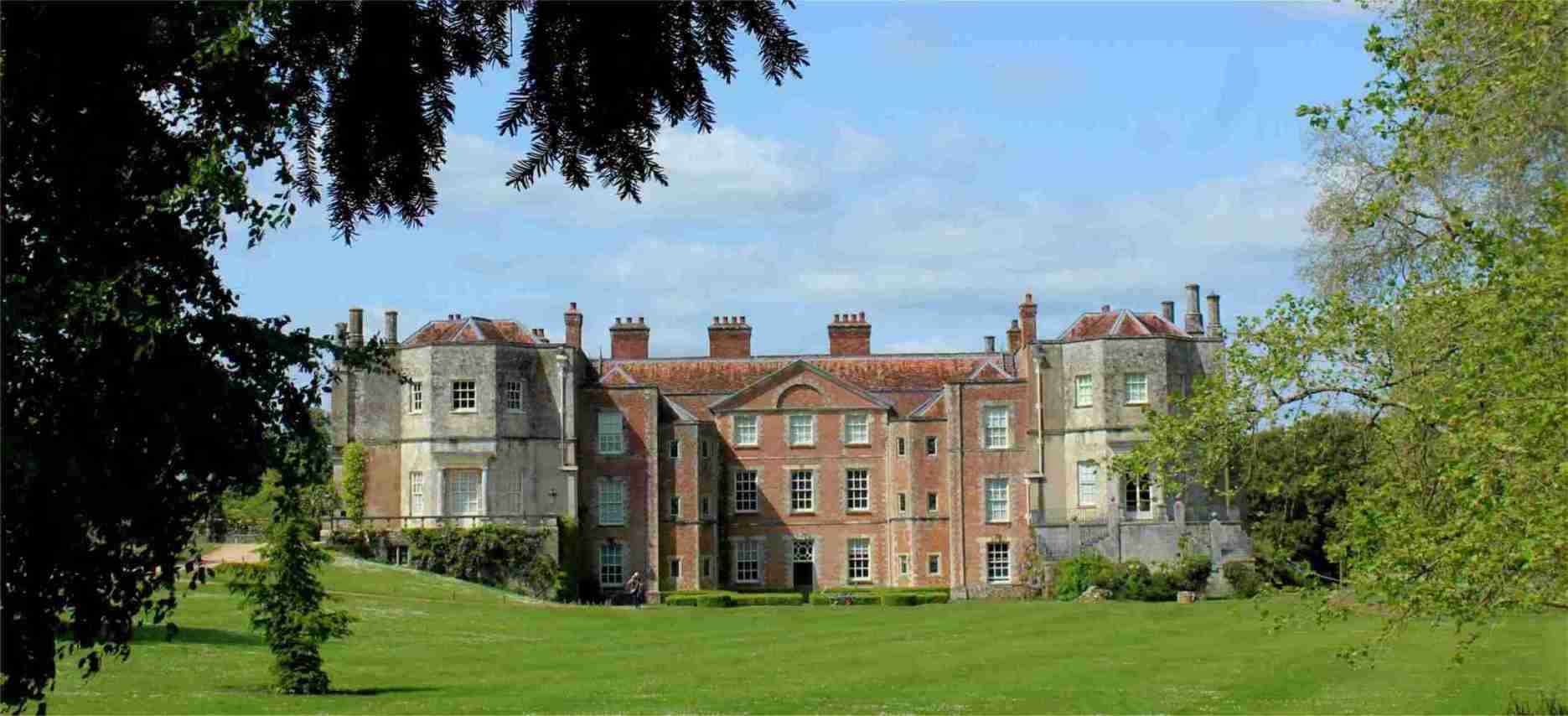
Mottisfont main building May 2023

It was at this time that the owners added "Abbey" to the name of the house rather than the more historically correct "Priory". The National Trust speculates that the name was considered to be more romantic. Under Sir John Barker-Mill, in the early 19th century, the estate became a centre for hunting, shooting and fishing, and a new stable block was built. The last decades of the 19th century saw Mottisfont let to wealthy banker Daniel Meinertzhagen under eccentric terms that forbade the installation of electric light or central heating. The ten Meinertzhagen children included Daniel and Richard, who built aviaries for their collection of eagles, hawks, owls and ravens. Richard wrote detailed diaries about his childhood and growing interest in the natural world.

=== 20th century ===
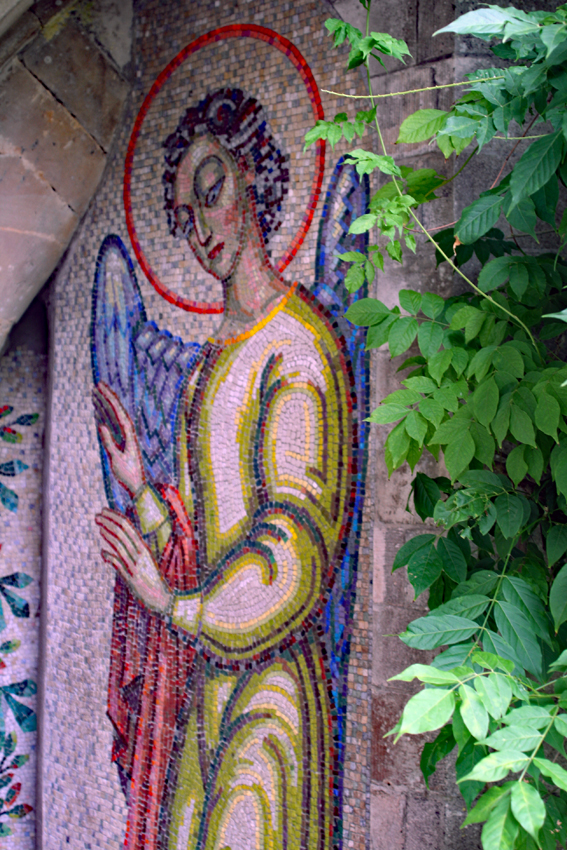
Angel Mosaic by Boris Anrep

The arrival of Maud and Gilbert Russell in 1934 made Mottisfont the centre of a fashionable artistic and political circle. Maud was a wealthy patron of the arts, and she created a substantial country house where she entertained artists and writers including Ben Nicholson and Ian Fleming. She commissioned some of her artist and designer friends to embellish Mottisfont, always with an eye on its history, which fascinated her. Rex Whistler created the illusion of Gothic architecture in her salon (now known as the Whistler Room), a piece of trompe-l'œil painting that recalls the medieval architecture of the priory. Boris Anrep contributed mosaics both inside and outside the house, including one of an angel featuring Maud's face – the couple had a long love affair.

During World War II, Mottisfont was commandeered as a hospital with 80 beds.

Maud Russell gave the house and grounds to the National Trust in 1957, although continuing to live there until 1972. One of the artists who had visited regularly was Derek Hill, a society portrait painter who had a private passion for landscape painting, and who collected work by his contemporaries. He donated a substantial collection of early 20th-century art to the National Trust to be shown at Mottisfont, in memory of his long friendship with Maud Russell. Today, these works are joined by a changing programme of temporary exhibitions of 20th-century and contemporary art.

== Burials ==
- Maud Chaworth, 14th-century noblewoman and heiress

== Visitor attraction ==
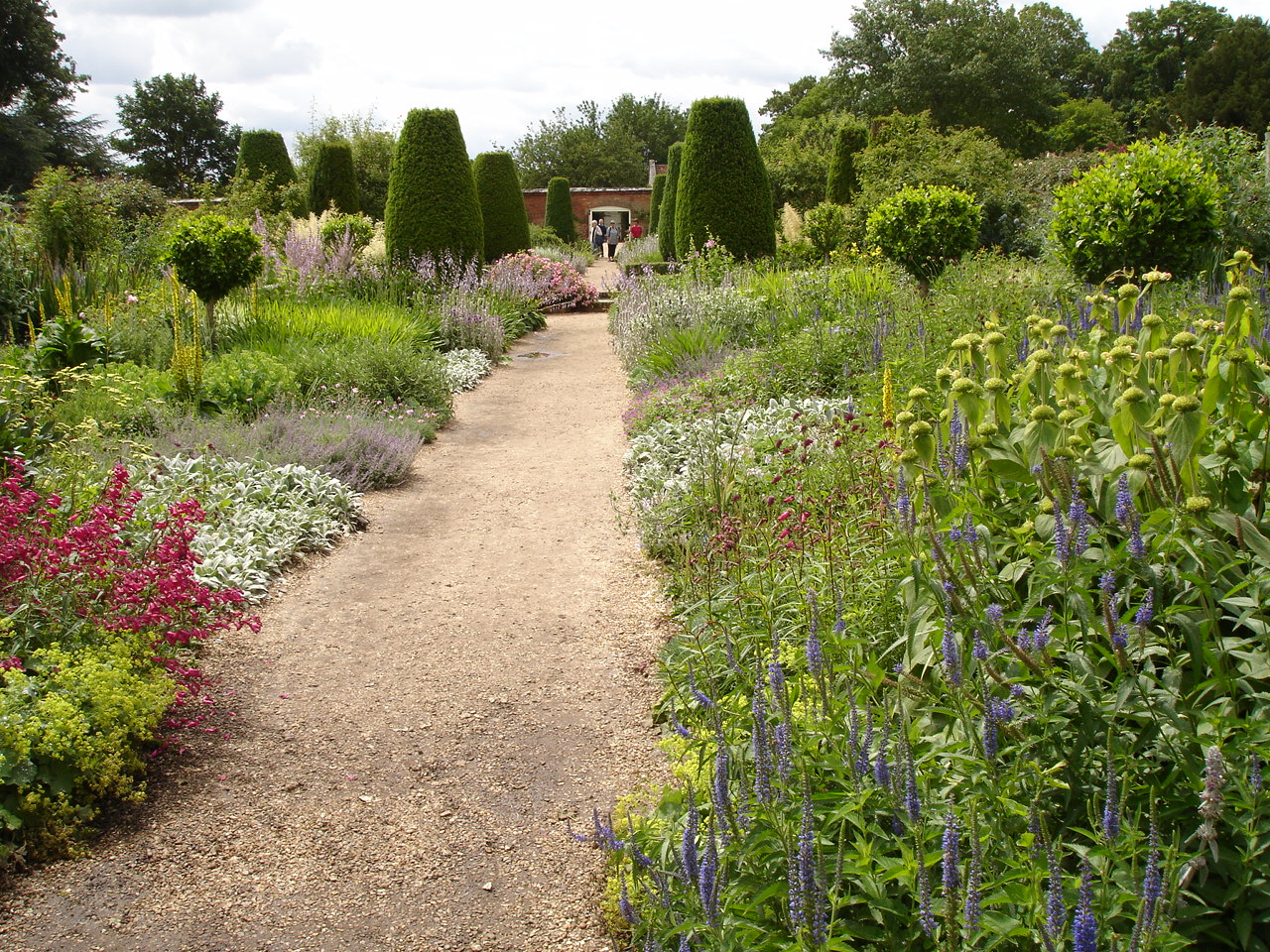
Mottisfont Abbey gardens

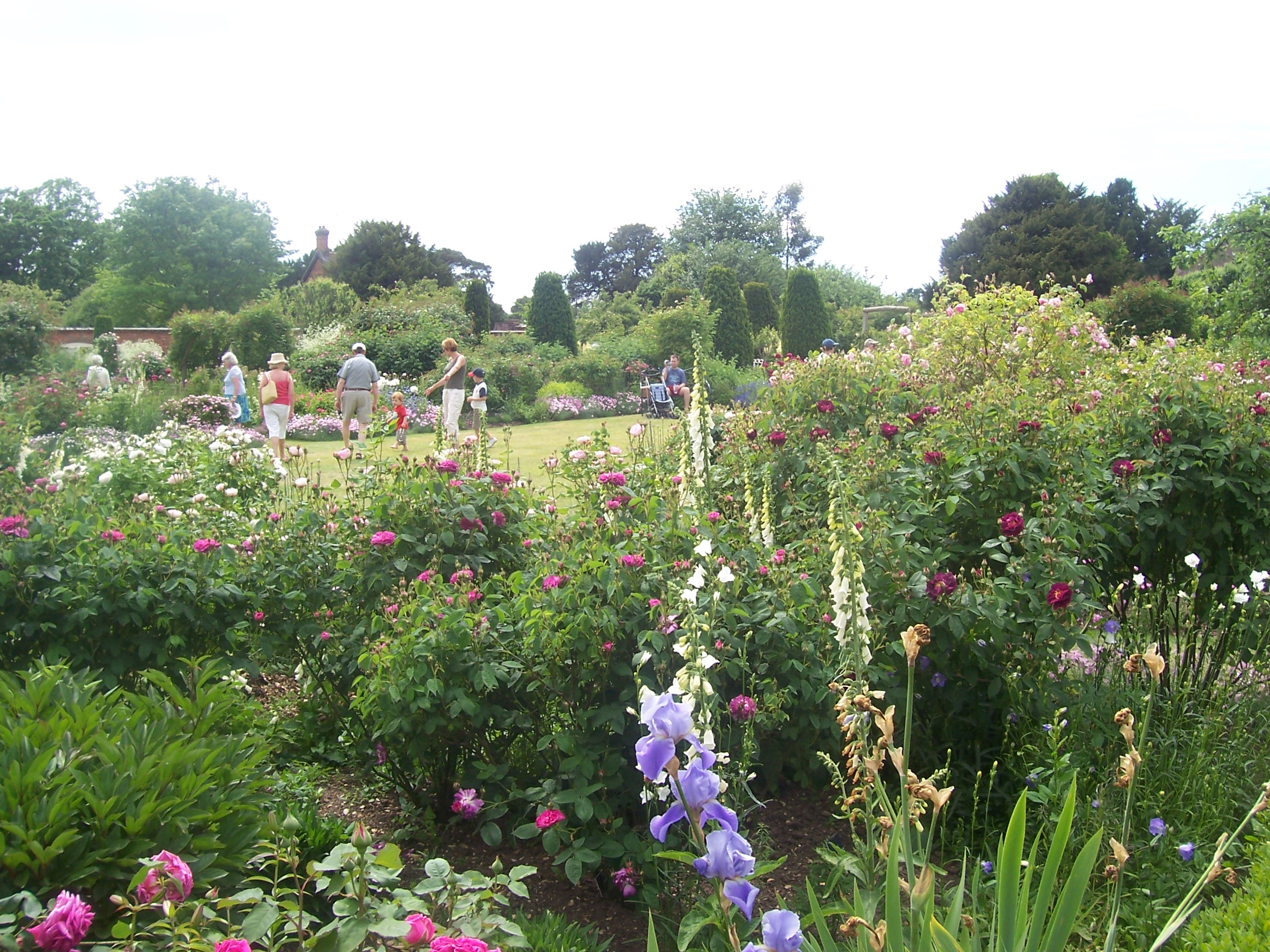
Mottisfont Rose Garden

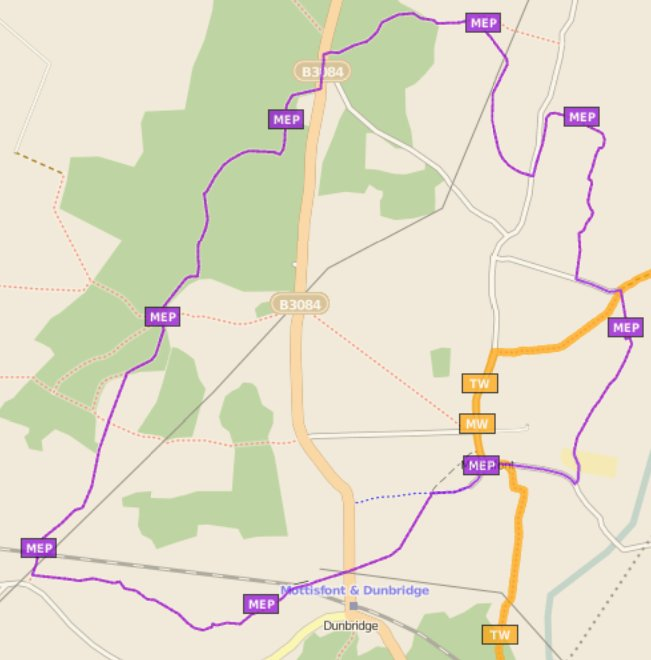
A map of the estate walk

Mottisfont Abbey has extensive grounds. There are areas of wooded shade, a walk along the River Test, enough lawn for picnics, and games are allowed on the lawns, too. There is the largest specimen of a London plane tree in Britain.

Mottisford is home to the Plant Heritage National Plant Collection Rosa (pre-1900 shrub rose). The roses reach their peak in June and are scented, particularly on early summer evenings.

In the summer months there are often theatre productions outside, and at different times of the year there are specific trails, mainly but not exclusively aimed at children, for example at Easter, Halloween, Christmas etc.

Refreshments are sold at several points and there is a modern National Trust shop, ice cream parlour and exhibition space. A new Visitor Centre was completed early in 2016. An environmentally friendly building, it is heated in winter months by a biomass boiler burning wood-chips from the estate.

From The Test Way, which passes through Mottisfont and around the Abbey grounds, the main house is seen from the rear as you pass through fields along the northern boundary.
