= Robert Goble =

English harpsichord builder

Robert Goble (1903–1991) was an English harpsichord builder.

The son of Harriet and John Goble, a wheelwright, he grew up in Thursley, Surrey. He first encountered pioneering early-instrument-maker Arnold Dolmetsch and his family in the autumn of 1917, when they took refuge from London air raids by renting a small house in Thursley before settling in nearby Jesses, Haslemere. He was later taken on by Dolmetsch as an assistant. In 1928, a music scholarship from Dolmetsch went to Elizabeth Brown, of Liverpool, who was to become Goble's wife in 1930; he survived her by 10 years. She was primarily a keyboard player; she later became a player of the bass viol.

In the late 1930s he set up independently, making recorders and furniture. He also made a harpsichord for his wife, using a plucking mechanism that he had invented and was to patent; though it was not practical in the long run and he did not take it further. He had two sons: Andrea, born in 1931, followed his father into the business, and Paul, born in 1933, became a painter.

During the Second World War, he went to work in a Gosport boatyard, making motor torpedo boats, and then at the branch of the Admiralty that was based at Haslemere, where he made apparatus for radar research.

In 1947, he moved to Headington, on the outskirts of Oxford, to a house with space for a large workshop. After his son Andrea left school to work with him, the firm of Robert Goble & Son came into being, making recorders (for the first five years), spinets, clavichords and harpsichords. His wife often decorated the soundboards.

At this period of the early instrument revival, harpsichord builders were interested in updating the instrument, not only adding more features such as a low 16' set of strings and pedals to change the registers. They were also keen to find new materials to build with, such as metal and plastic, and new methods of manufacture like those used in piano construction, so the instrument could be made to stand up to the demands of concert touring with a robustness not found in historical instruments. Goble produced his first concert model in 1952, which was a success. Further improvements were made and his harpsichords were played by noted musicians, such as Millicent Silver; they were exported to Australia, the Netherlands and the United States. The workforce remained small; seven at its highest. In the 25 years the workshop sent off about 700 keyboard instruments.

In about 1970, the historically informed performance movement caught up with him. Authenticity of sound was demanded, and this meant abandoning the search for improvement of previous decades and returning to the baroque models. But this was to be his son's task. The continuity of the firm was assured by his son Andrea and the addition of his grandson Anthony Goble.

The harpsichord played by American singer-songwriter Tori Amos on her 1996 album Boys For Pele and the subsequent Dew Drop Inn Tour was made by Robert Goble & Son. The model she used is the Christian Zell double manual, Hamburg 1728.

== See also ==
- List of historical harpsichord makers
