= Johann Adolph Hass =

German maker of clavichords, harpsichords and possibly organs

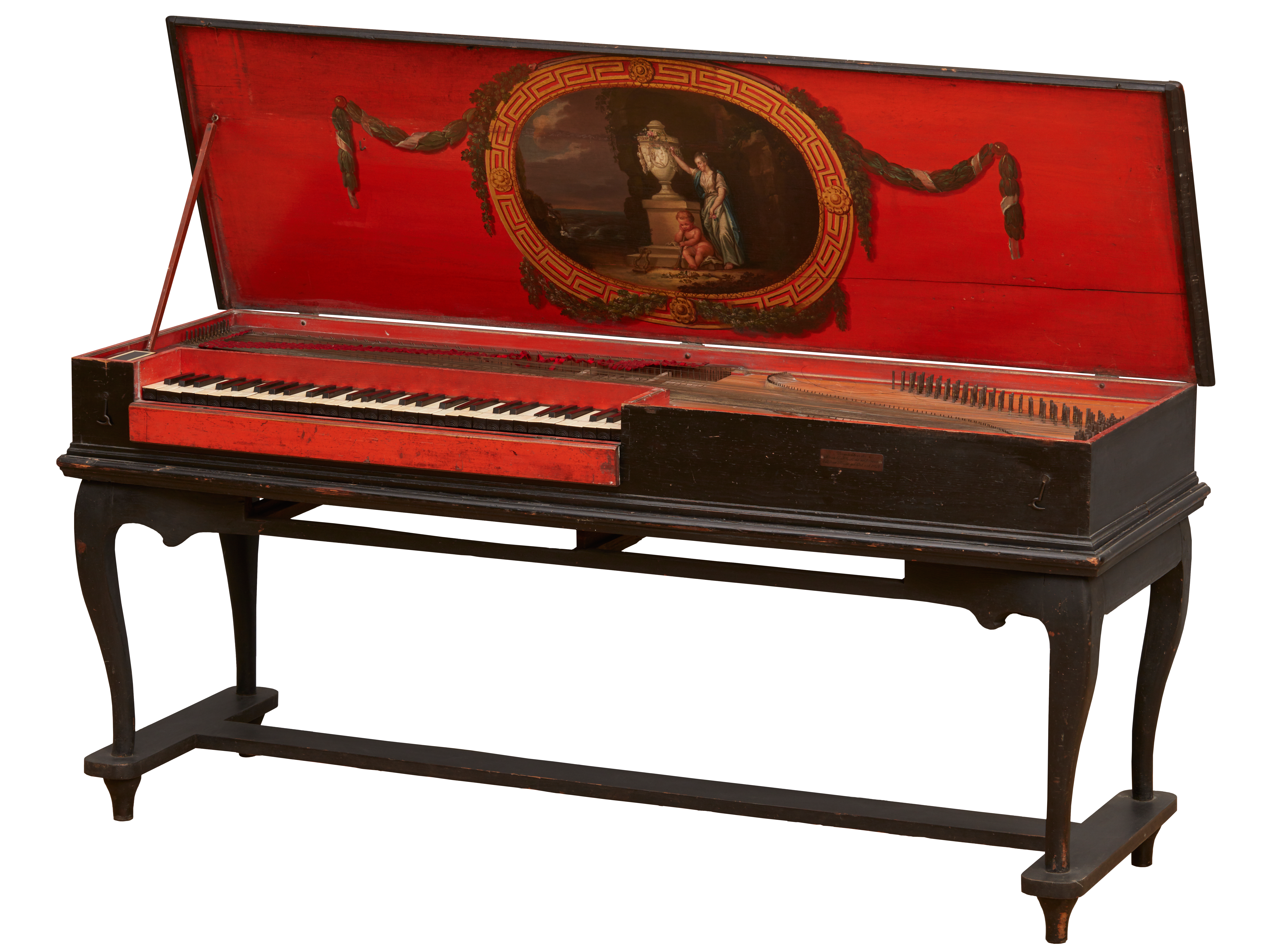
- Clavichord, 1760, Museum für Kunst und Gewerbe Hamburg
- Baptised: 12 March 1713
- Died: buried 29 May 1771
- Other names: Johan; Haas; Hasse; Hase; Hasch
- Citizenship: Hamburg
- Occupation: maker of keyboard instruments

Johann Adolph Rudolph Hass (baptised 12 March 1713, buried 29 May 1771), usually known as Johann Adolph Hass, was a German maker of clavichords, harpsichords and possibly organs. He was the son of Hieronymus Albrecht Hass, also a maker of keyboard instruments.

== Life ==
Hass was born in the Imperial Free City of Hamburg, and was baptised on 12 March 1713. He became a citizen of the city on 28 October 1746, and was admitted to the chamber of commerce in the following year.

There is no mention of either Hass before 1758, when Jakob Adlung mentioned a cembal d'amour made by "Hasse in Hamburg". Both father and son are mentioned in the German translation of Charles Burney's The Present State of Music in Germany, the Netherlands, and United Provinces (1773): "Hasse, father and son, of Hamburg, both dead; their harpsichords and clavichords are much sought after". Ernst Ludwig Gerber said much the same in his Historischbiographisches Lexicon of 1790.

Hass died in Hamburg and was buried on 29 May 1771. His business may have been continued by Johann Christoffer Krogmann, a builder of fortepianos who was married to Hass's daughter Margaretha Catharina.

== Instruments ==
Hass clavichord in the Russell Collection, Edinburgh

Hass's instruments are known to be cleverly designed, strongly built, richly decorated and finely finished.

He built large clavichords of the kind that post-Baroque composers such as Carl Philipp Emanuel Bach wrote for, with good tone and volume, and capable of expressive bebung.

Eight Hass harpsichords are known to survive. A massive instrument by Johann Adolph with two manuals and five sets of strings (16', 2 × 8', 4', 2'), with tortoiseshell natural keys and ivory-topped sharps, dates from 1760–1761, and is now in the Yale University Collection of Musical Instruments in New Haven, Connecticut. A single-manual instrument from 1763, with two 8' and one 4' sets of strings, is in the Russell Collection in Edinburgh.
