= St Cecilia's Hall =

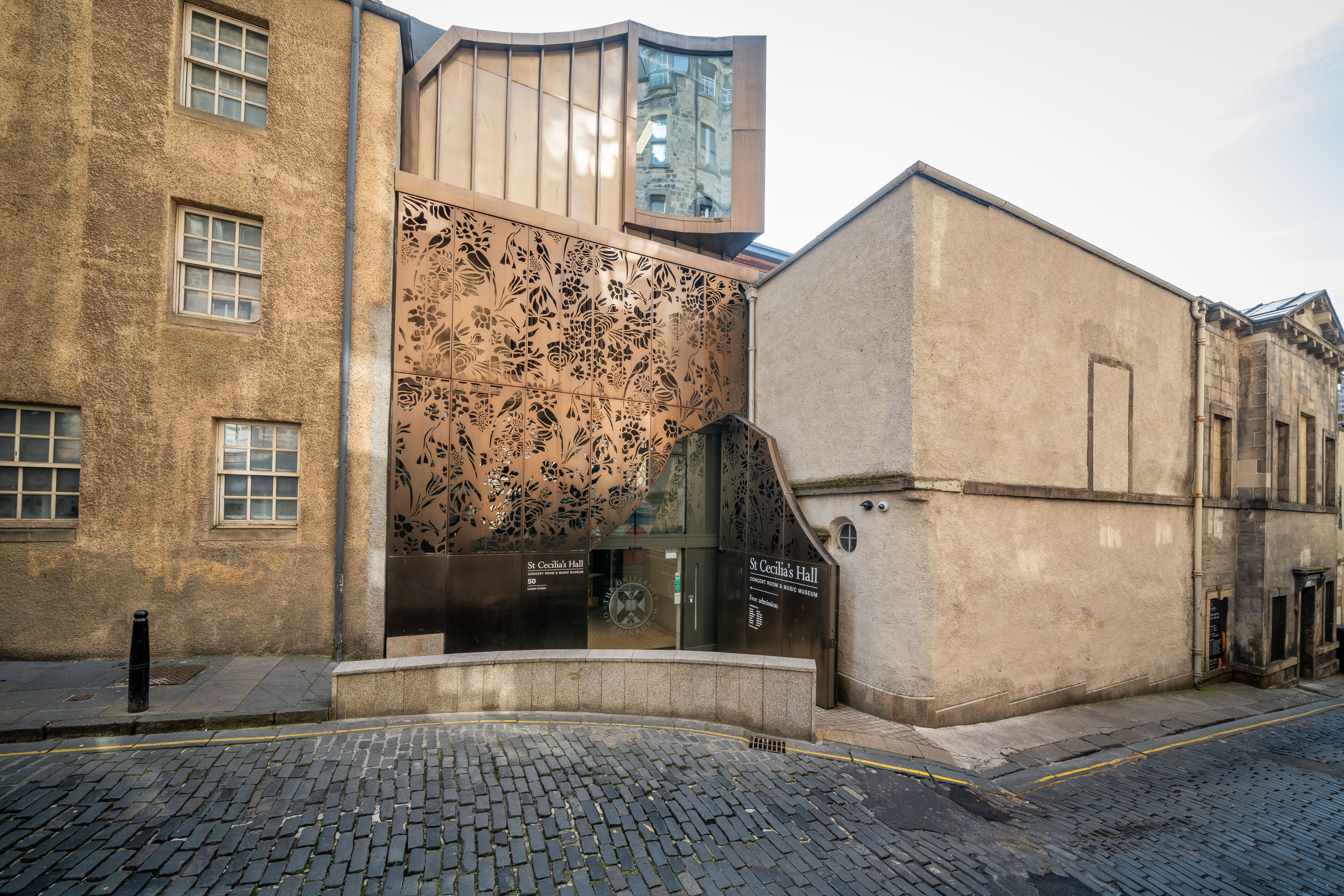
- The entrance to St Cecilia's Hall on Niddry St

- Location in Edinburgh Location in Scotland
- Established: 1763
- Location: Edinburgh, Scotland
- Coordinates: 55.94903°N 3.18649°W
- Type: Music museum, concert hall
- Collections: Russell Collection; Rodger Mirrey Collection; Anne Macaulay Collection
- Architect: Robert Mylne
- Owner: University of Edinburgh
- Website: www.stcecilias.ed.ac.uk

Listed Building – Category A
- Designated: 14 December 1970
- Reference no.: LB27760

St Cecilia's Hall is a small concert hall and museum in the city of Edinburgh, Scotland, in the United Kingdom. It is on the corner of Niddry Street and the Cowgate, about 168 metres (551 ft) south of the Royal Mile. The hall dates from 1763 and was the first purpose-built concert hall in Scotland. It is a Category A listed building.

The hall belongs to the University of Edinburgh, and houses part of the university's collection of musical instruments, including the Russell Collection and the collections of Rodger Mirrey and Anne Macaulay. It is used for a classical chamber music concerts and, during summer, as a venue of the Edinburgh International Festival.

== History ==
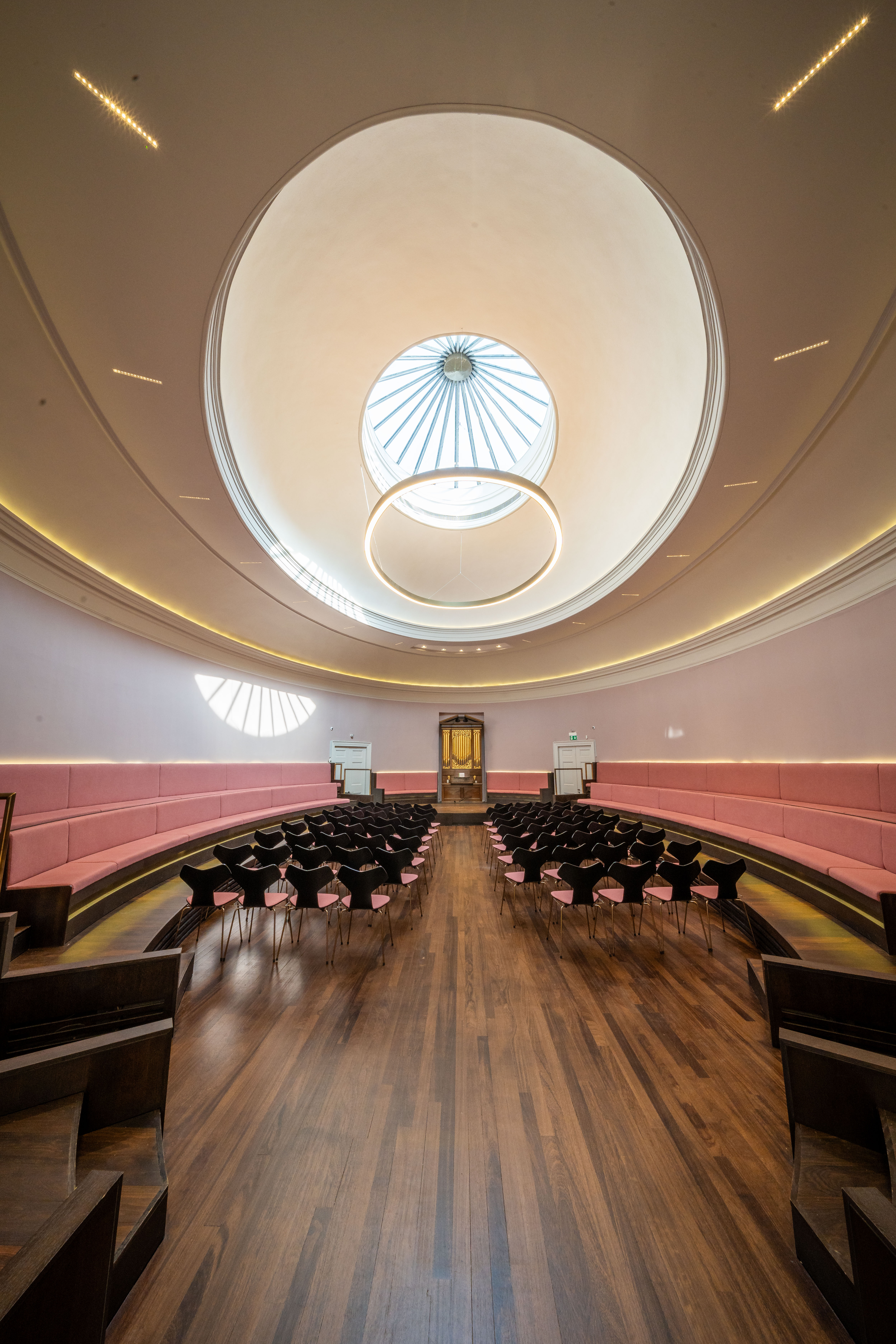
The distinctive elliptical Sypert Concert Room

St Cecilia's Hall was originally commissioned by the Edinburgh Musical Society (EMS) and designed by the Scottish architect Robert Mylne, who also designed Blackfriars Bridge in London. The EMS was founded in 1728, and for its first 35 years its members met in the upper hall of St Mary's Chapel, a small church that formerly stood to the north of the present hall. In December 1763, after completion of Mylne's new hall, the EMS held an inaugural concert in honour of Saint Cecilia, patron saint of musicians.

St Cecilia's was the first purpose-built concert hall in Scotland when it was completed in 1763, not far behind the first in Europe, the Holywell Music Room in Oxford, built in 1748. Mylne designed the building with an oval concert hall on the first floor level with a rehearsal room on the ground floor. Originally, the main entrance opened out to a small courtyard off Niddry's Wynd, and a portico was added to the entrance around 1787.

In 1785 the City of Edinburgh commenced a major civil engineering project — the construction of South Bridge, a road bridge above the Cowgate to link the Old Town to the university in the south of the city, which was completed in 1787. The new bridge resulted in the loss of several ancient closes, including Niddry's Wynd; St Cecilia's Hall lost its original entrance courtyard. With South Bridge and its high tenement buildings looming over St Cecilia's, the Cowgate became a dark and undesirable location for Edinburgh's concert-goers, who by now were flocking to the newly built Assembly Rooms in the more fashionable New Town on the other side of the city. Audiences at St Cecilia's Hall dwindled and eventually the EMS discontinued performances; the last EMS concert was held in 1798. By 1801, the EMS had quietly disbanded and sold the hall to a Baptist congregation.

On 16 October 1821, St. Cecilia's Hall became the site of the Edinburgh School of Arts, now Heriot-Watt University, first lecture in chemistry. It was then home to classes between 1821 and 1837 when the institution moved to Adam Square.

The building was later used as a Freemasons' lodge, a warehouse, a school (headed by Andrew Bell), and as Magdalene Cairns's Excelsior Ballroom. It was purchased by the University of Edinburgh in 1959.

== Architecture ==
The exterior is in plain Neoclassical style, with ashlar facing. On the upper floor is the Sypert Concert Room, an elliptical room with a moulded plaster cornice, and a domed ceiling topped with a central elliptical cupola. William Adam (1738–1822) visited the hall and wrote to his brother John Adam that he had found it "ugly and squat". In 1966, the university commissioned the architect Ian Lindsay to reconstruct the interior of the concert hall. He built a new eastern elevation and made a new entrance to the hall. The Hall opened after the restoration in 1968.

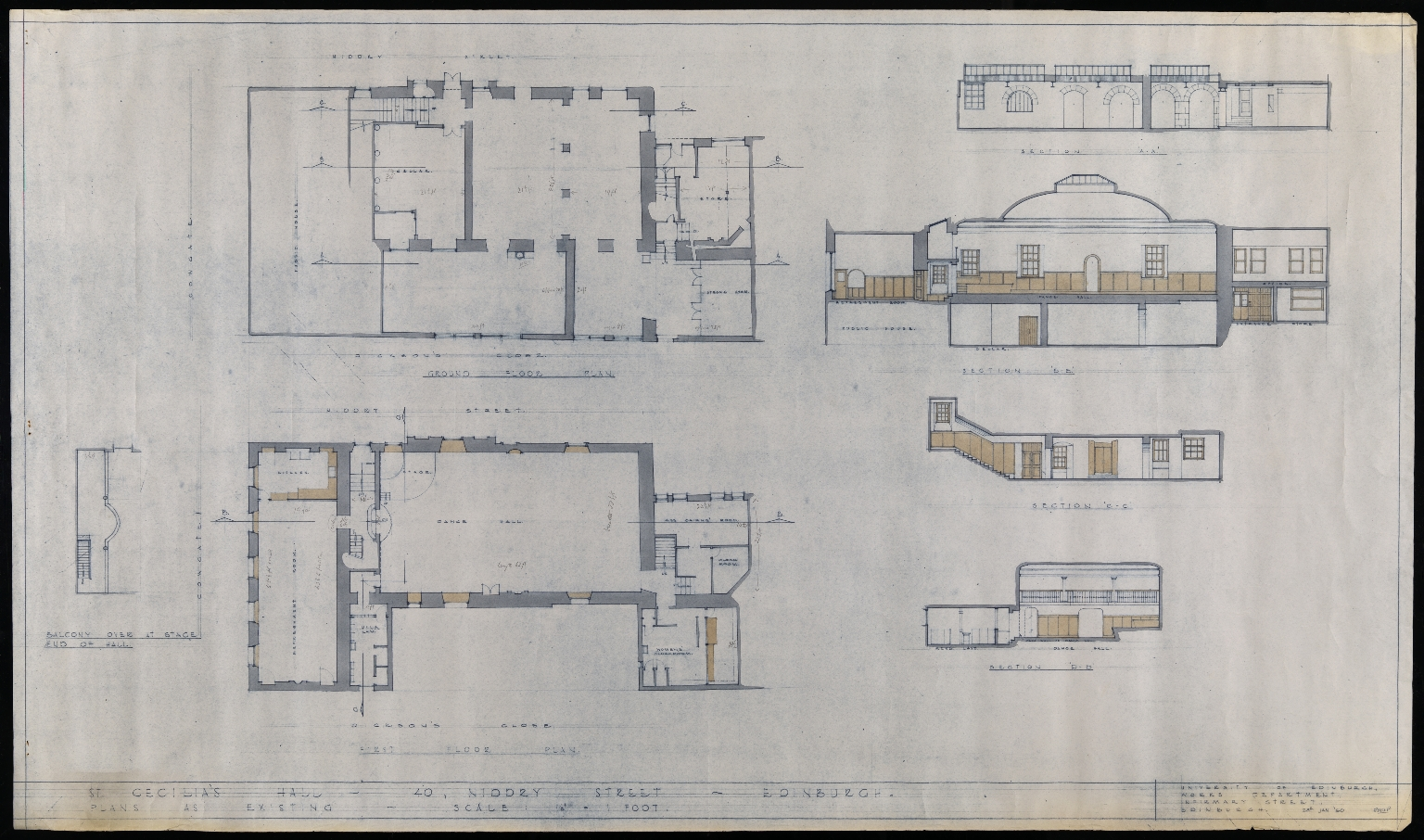
St.Cecilia's Hall Plan

In 2016, St Cecilia's Hall underwent a £6.5m restoration and renovation in order to improve the concert hall and museum facilities. The project was partly funded by the Heritage Lottery Fund, as part of its work to support historical buildings of cultural importance. It re-opened to the public in 2017.

== Music museum ==
As well as a concert venue, St Cecilia's Hall houses a musical instrument museum which is open to visitors from Tuesday to Saturday. It is one of two branches of the university's collection of historic musical instruments, and displays items from the Rodger Mirrey and Russell Collections of early keyboard instruments, as well as the Anne Macaulay Collection of plucked string instruments.

The museum holds more than 500 instruments and has an active programme of conservation and restoration. The collections include harpsichords, virginals, spinets, organs, fortepianos, harps, lutes, citterns and guitars.

In 1967, a chamber organ built by John Snetzler for the Earl of Normanton in about 1750 was bought for the hall. It was installed in the Sypert Concert Room by the Nottinghamshire organ builder firm Goetze and Gwynn. Immediately after installation, the mechanism was damaged by dry air and was rendered unplayable until it was restored in 2017.

== Gallery ==
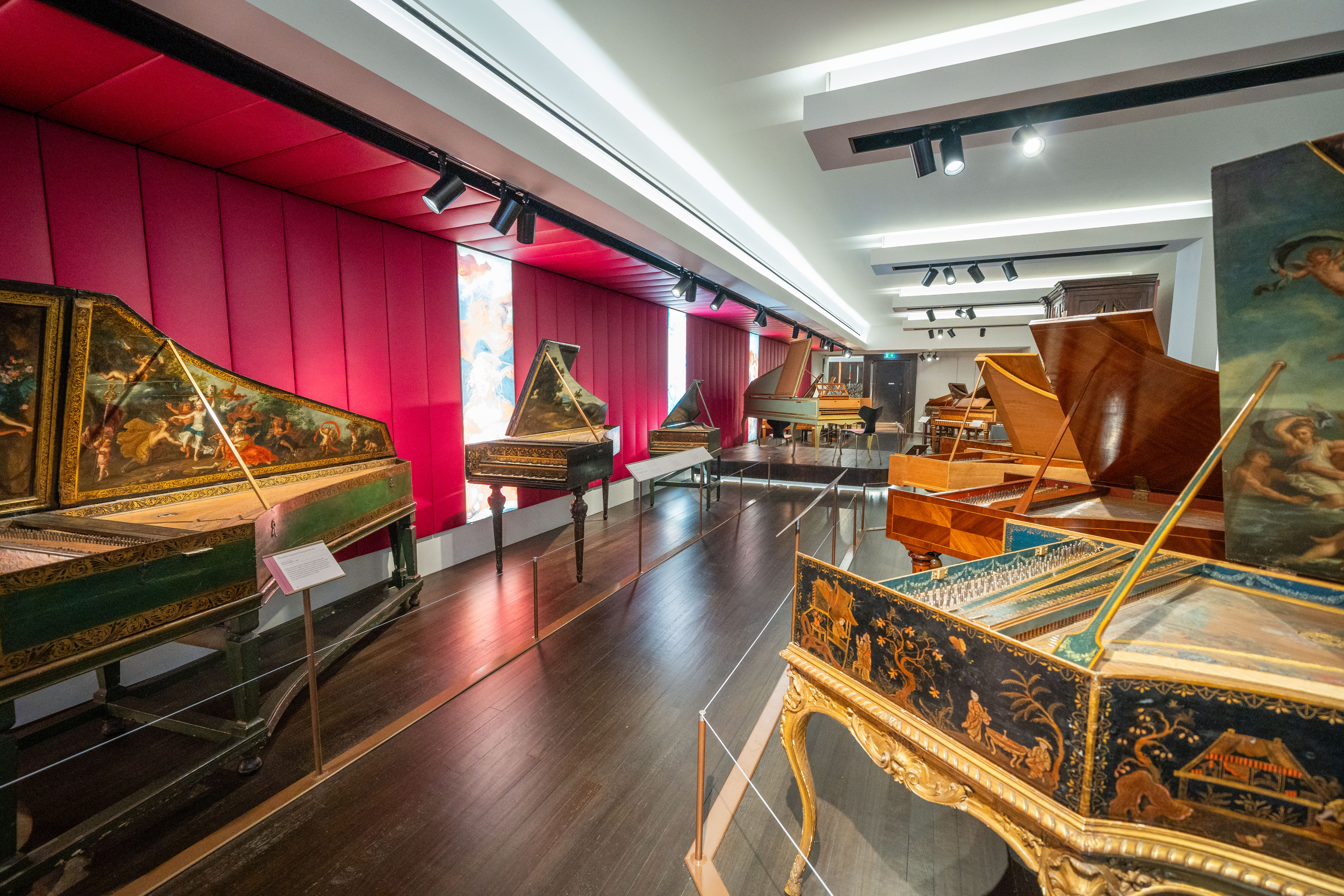
The keyboard collection

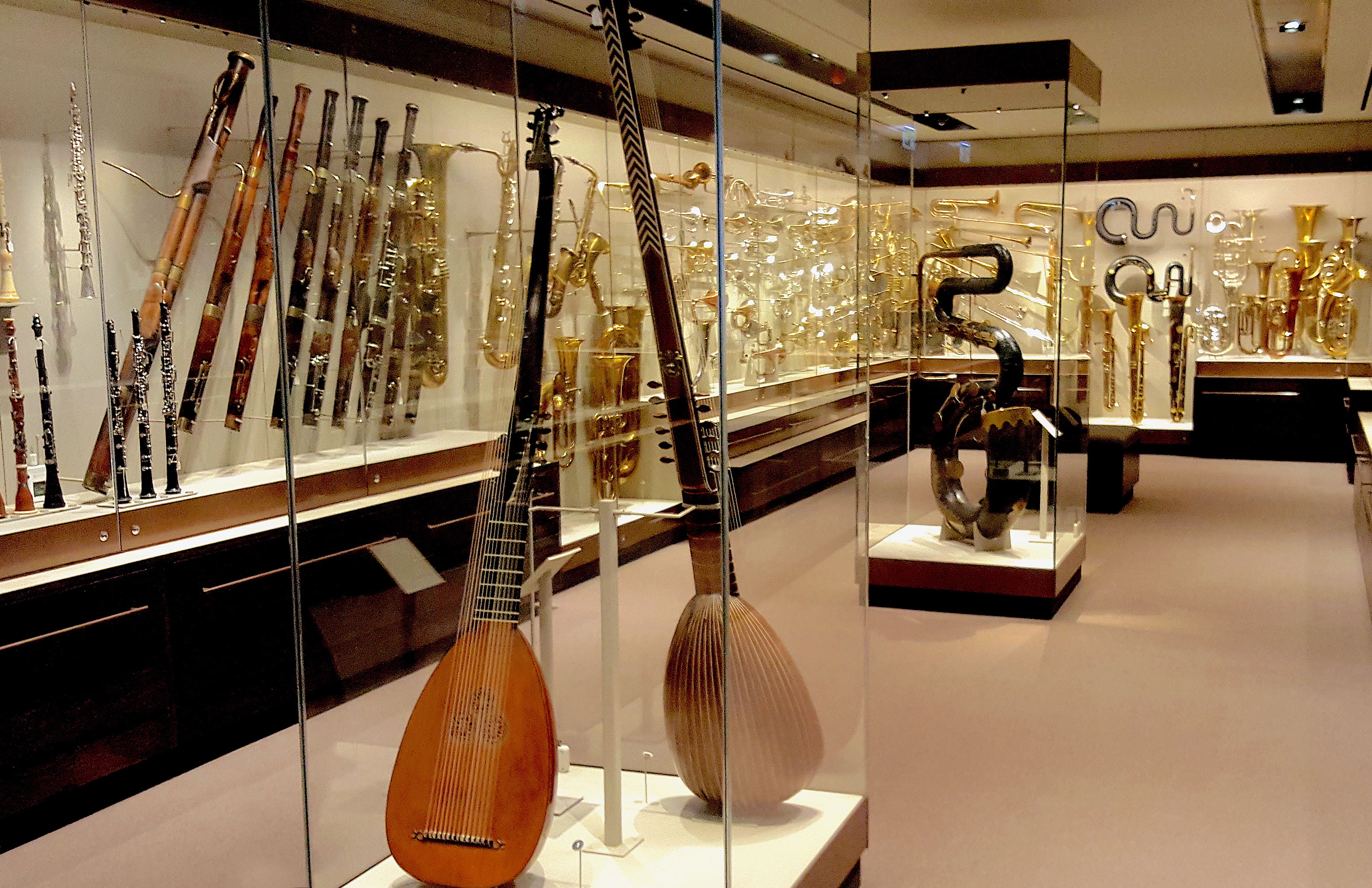
Wind and string instruments

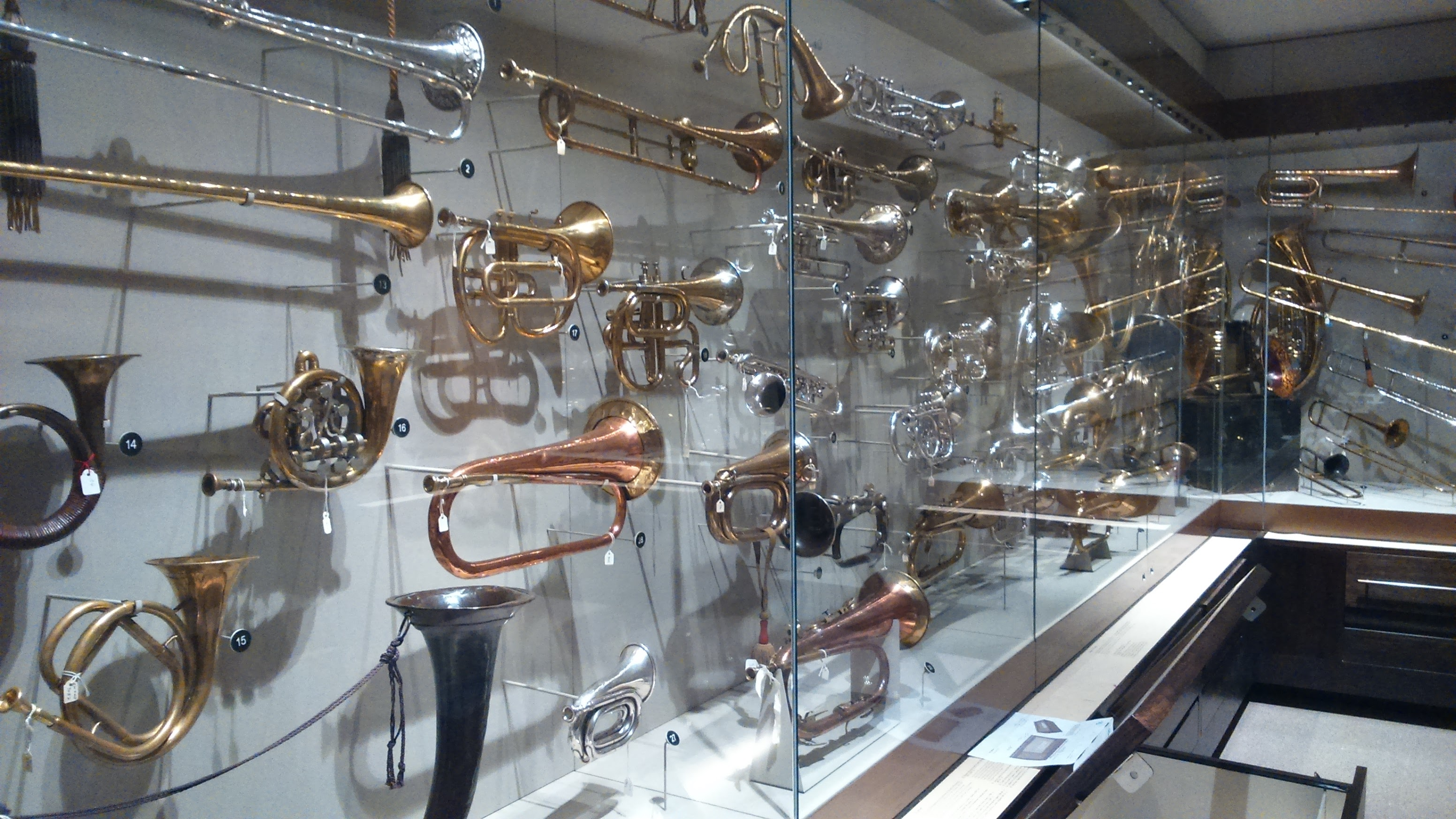
Brass instruments

== See also ==
- Listed buildings in Scotland
- Reid Concert Hall
- List of music museums
