= Michael Mietke =

German harpsichord and harp maker

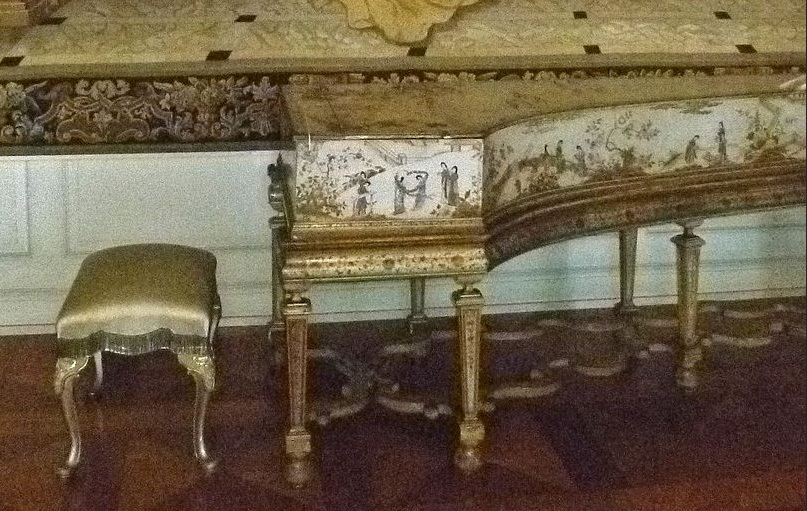
The 1702-4 "White Mietke", a single manual, 2x8' instrument, decorated by Gerard Dagly, preserved in the Schloss Charlottenburg, Berlin.

Michael Mietke (c. 1656/1671 – 1719) was a German harpsichord and harp maker.

== Biography ==
He lived his entire life in Berlin and is known to have been an instrument maker there from 1695. He succeeded Christoph Werner in 1707 as official maker to the court. He delivered a harpsichord to the court at Köthen in 1719 on the recommendation of Johann Sebastian Bach, which was probably the instrument for which Bach composed Brandenburg concerto no.5 as a show-piece.

== Surviving instruments ==
Three of his harpsichords survive:

A plain single-manual instrument, preserved Hudiksvall, Sweden, is signed 'Berlin, 1710'.

In Schloss Charlottenburg in Berlin there are two instruments, both probably made for the court. Both are unsigned, although they have been linked to Mietke beyond reasonable doubt. One is a single-manual, which belonged personally to Queen Sophie Charlotte, and the other a double-manual. Both are lavishly decorated by the court decorator Gerard Dagly: the single manual instrument, covered with gilded chinoiserie on a porcelain white background, earning the instrument the affectionate modern nickname "The White Mietke", while the double manual instrument is in similar style, but on a black background and thus often referred to as "The Black Mietke".

== Progeny ==
The sons and grandson of Michael Mietke followed in his footsteps:

- Michael Mietke II (5 March 1702 – April/August 1754) was his son; he became harpsichord maker to the Königsberg court in 1728.
- Georg[e] Mietke (31 January 1704 – 1770), also his son, left Berlin in 1729, moving to Danzig, and then in 1739 to Königsberg, where he had a licence to build 'Claviere, und musikalische Instrumenten' in 1747.
- Friedrich Mietke (1746 – c. 1805) Michael Mietke's grandson and the son of Georg Mietke, and was taught by him until 1765. He became maker to the court in 1770.

== Sources ==
- Dieter Krickerberg: 'Mietke', Grove Music Online ed. L. Macy (Accessed 2007-05-18), http://www.grovemusic.com/
- Kottick EL, A History of the Harpsichord, 2003, Indiana University Press

== See also ==
- List of historical harpsichord makers
