= John Taylor (architect) =

English architect (1833–1912)

Sir John Taylor KCB, FRIBA
- Born: 15 November 1833; Warkworth, Northumberland, England
- Died: 30 April 1912 (aged 78); Surbiton, Surrey, England
- Occupation: Architect

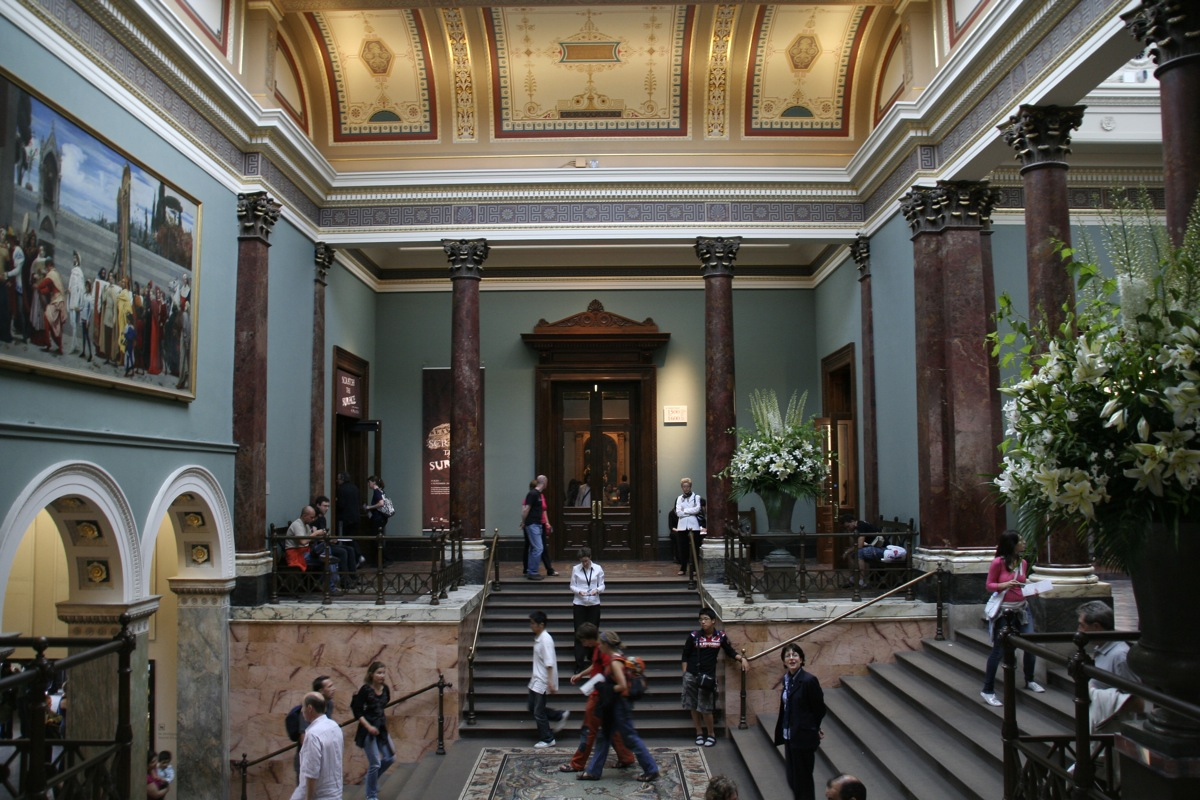
Entrance hall of the National Gallery, London, designed by John Taylor.

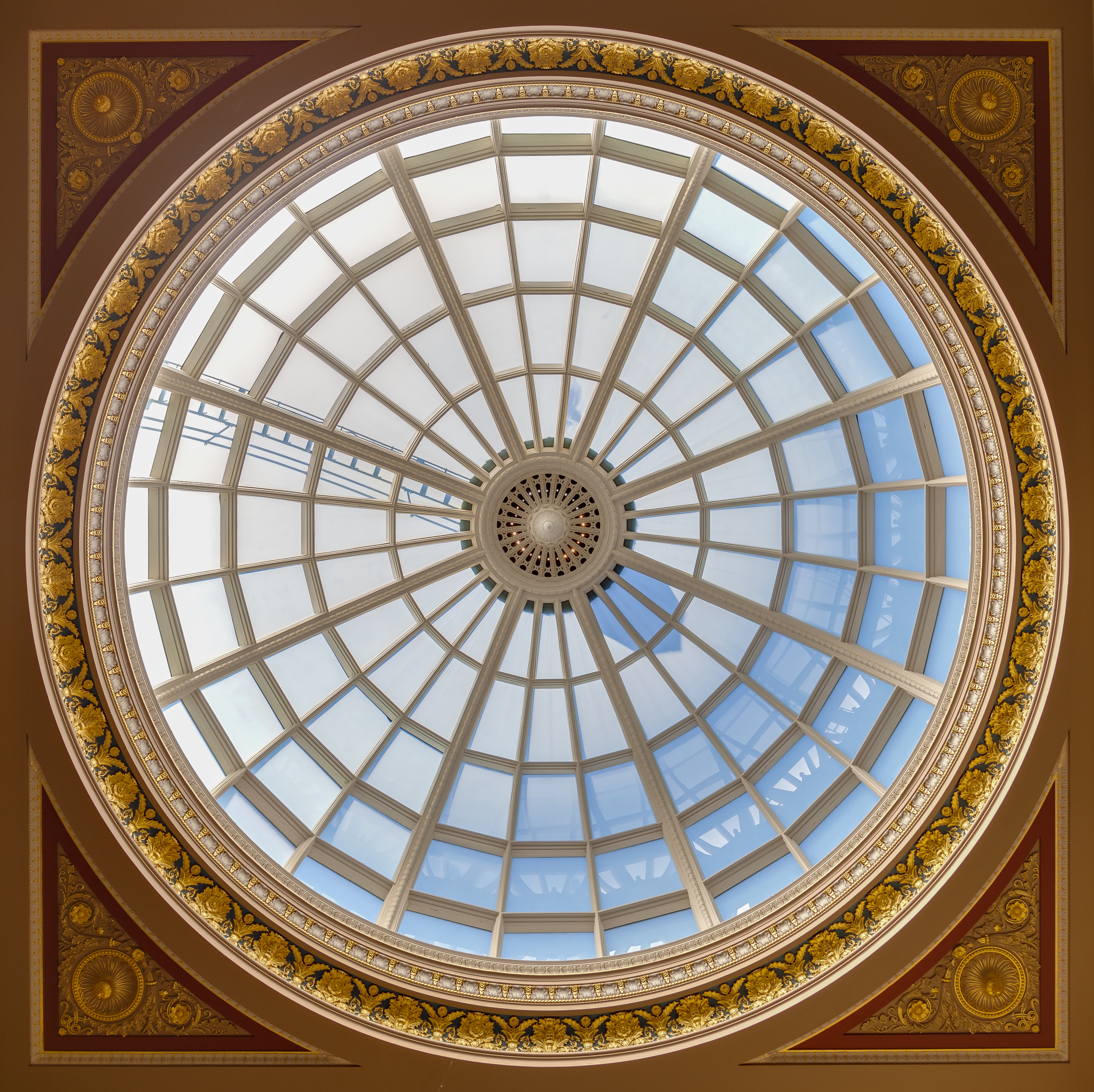
Dome of the National Gallery's entrance hall.

Sir John Taylor, KCB, FRIBA (15 November 1833 in Warkworth, Northumberland – 30 April 1912 in Surbiton, Surrey) was a British architect working for the Office of Works.

== Early life ==
The son of a joiner, Taylor first trained in the service of the Duke of Northumberland and under Anthony Salvin, who, from 1852, remodelled the duke's Alnwick Castle.

== Office of Works ==
After working with the contractors George Smith & Co., Taylor entered the Office of Works in 1859. From 1866 to 1898 he served as surveyor of palaces and public building in London district.

Taylor's most active period as an architect began in 1879–80 with the construction of Bow Street Magistrates' Court which the listing entry describes as "dignified, eclectic Graeco-Roman with some slightly Vanbrughian details, rather in the Pennethorne manner." In 1883–84 he was a judge in the competition for the Admiralty and War Office buildings in Whitehall, and in 1886 added a new storey to Marlborough House.

In the 1880s, Taylor was involved in restructuring work in a number of London's museums. He was responsible for display fittings of the new Natural History Museum and built the White Wing of the British Museum from 1882 to 1884. From 1885 to 1887, Taylor designed and built the vestibule and central hall with staircase of the National Gallery, London, for which he is best known.

He was also involved in engineering projects such as the extension of the Thames Embankment at Millbank.

== Consulting Architect ==
Highly regarded as a technical expert and planner of well-functioning buildings, Taylor remained attached to the Office of Works even after his retirement in 1898. As a consulting architect, he fulfilled the projects he had in hand.

Due to the death of its original architect William Young in 1900, Taylor, together with Young's son Clyde Francis Young, was given the task of completing the construction of the War Office building. He resigned from his post after the building's completion in 1906 but remained a member of the advisory committee on the new public buildings.

== Honours and memberships ==
Taylor was well respected as an architect as well as a public servant.

He became a member of the Royal Institute of British Architects in 1881, was a member of its council from 1899 to 1900 and served as vice-president 1905–06.

In recognition of his service, in 1895, Taylor was made Companion, and in 1897 Knight Commander of the Order of the Bath.

== Private life ==
Taylor was a member of the Civil Service Rifles and a good shot, winning several competitions of the National Rifle Association. He was also a keen golfer, captain of the Royal Wimbledon Golf Club and, in 1887, a founder member of the Royal St George's Golf Club at Sandwich, Kent.
