= Mary Shudi =

- Died: 1797
- Burial place: St Marylebone
- Known for: Harpsichord maker
- Spouse: Joshua Shudi

Mary Shudi (died 1797) was a harpsichord maker continuing her husband, Joshua Shudi's, workshop after his death in 1774.

== Early life ==
Before marriage, Mary Shudi was part of the Taylor family. She married into the Shudi family at St James Piccadilly on 31 October 1762, and her and Joshua's daughter, Rose Ann, was baptised in the same church on 18 July 1764.

== Controversy surrounding Joshua Shudi's workshop ==
While Mary's husband, Joshua Shudi, is recorded as a harpsichord finisher and nephew of Burkat Shudi (the elder), he was dismissed from the Shudi family workshop and business partnership between the Shudi and Broadwood families. His dismissal in 1766-7 was recorded in the St James’s Chronicle or the British Evening Post in the 1–3 January 1767 issue:

"HARPSICHORDS. Burkat Shudi, Harpsichord Maker to her Royal Highness the Princess Dowager of Wales,&c, at the Plume of Feathers, in Great Pultney Street, Golden-Square. (Having discharged my late Man, Josh. Shudi, from my Service) I take this Method of acquainting the Nobility, Gentry, &c. who for these many Years I have had the Honour of executing their Commands, and with the greatest Reputation, that I positively continue carrying on my Business with the utmost Assiduity (notwithstanding the most flagrant Insinuation to the contrary) and humbly hope for the Continuance of their Favours. All Orders to me will with the greatest Gratitude and Punctuality be obeyed, and all my Instruments finished by me as usual."

Joshua Shudi's personal workshop insurance policy was registered with the Sun Fire Office as of June 1776, indicating the opening of his independent workshop following his separation from Burkat Shudi's business. The workshop began to be advertised in the Gazetteer and New Daily Advertise on 30 January 1769, promoting Joshua Shudi as "late finisher to his uncle Burkat Shudi", though other archival news evidence suggests that, according to a notice by Joshua's former colleagues Andrew Clark, Thomas Nixon and John Broadwood in the St James's Chronicle or the British Evening Post on 13 January 1767, "during the whole time that he lived with the said Burkat Shudi, [Joshua Shudi] never did begin and finish any one Harpsichord".

According to the 1780 posthumous probate lawsuit Pether v Shudi (28 July 1780), it appears that at the time of Joshua Shudi’s death there were as many as 11 finished harpsichords at his home, of which three survive today.

== Inheriting Joshua Shudi's workshop ==
Upon the death of Joshua Shudi in 1774, Mary Shudi published her intent to succeed her late husband's business at 16 Berwick Street, St James Piccadilly in the Public Advertiser (16 January 1775 issue). As of her 1779 insurance policy with the Sun Fire Office (1779), her occupation is listed as ‘Harpsichord Maker’.

The structure of her workshop is unknown, though it's hypothesised she was supported by her son-in-law Arnold Frederick Beck, Mr Cosper (Joshua Shudi’s journeyman), and Mr Lang. Cosper's involvement in the workshop is supported by the Pether v Shudi Probate Inventory of Joshua Shudi, in which an outstanding debt of £11 14s 6d in unpaid wages owed by Joshua Shudi to Cosper is identified, suggesting his continued involvement in the workshop across the transfer of ownership.

Lang's work with the Joshua Shudi workshop is found in an advertisement posted, in the Public Advertiser (16 March 1781 issue):

"At Mr. Lang’s, Duke-street, Portland Chapel, to be disposed of, a Double-key’d Harpsichord, upon a new Construction, and excellent Tone, a pleasant Touch, will stand in Tune better and longer than them of other Makers, as it is the very best of Workmanship, done by the same Person that finished 55 Instruments in the Name of Shudi since his Death, for the Benefit of the surviving Mary Shudi."

As of the 1780 Probate Inventory, Joshua Shudi's workshop under Mary Shudi's directive was in possession of the following items, among others: 17 mahogany harpsichord cases, 16 keyboards, 11 harpsichord frames, 25 harpsichord tops, three double-manual harpsichords, two unfinished harpsichords, and two old harpsichords. Mary Shudi announced her decision to retire in the following notice, published in the Morning Chronicle (5 February 1780 issue):

"By Mr. COCHRAN,

On the Premises, No. 16, Berwick Street, Soho,

On Tuesday next the 8th Instant,

THE GENUINE HOUSHOLD FURNITURE, and STOCK in TRADE of Mrs. SHUDI, Harpsichord-maker, retiring into the Country; consisting of several capital double and single-keyed Harpsichords, and some unfinished; likewise a quantity of Mahogany and Walnut-tree Veneers, Work-benches, Tools, and sundry other Effects.

To be viewed on Saturday and till the sale (Sunday excepted) which will begin at Eleven o’Clock. Catalogues to be had on the Premises, at the Bank Coffee-house; Stewart’s, New-Bond Street; and at Mr. Cochran’s, Berner’s Street.

N.B. The Lease of the above Premises, 29 years of which are unexpired, subject to a small rent, will be put up at One o’Clock."

It is thought that Mary Shudi may have retired due to an inability to cover payments and debts to Cosper and Pether, as brought up in the Pether v Shudi Probate lawsuit.

== Later life and death ==
Where Mary Shudi retired to is unknown, but a record of her burial shows that this took place at St Marylebone on 16 May 1797.
