= Sturehov Manor =

Manor house in Stockholm, Sweden

- Botkyrka Municipality, Sweden
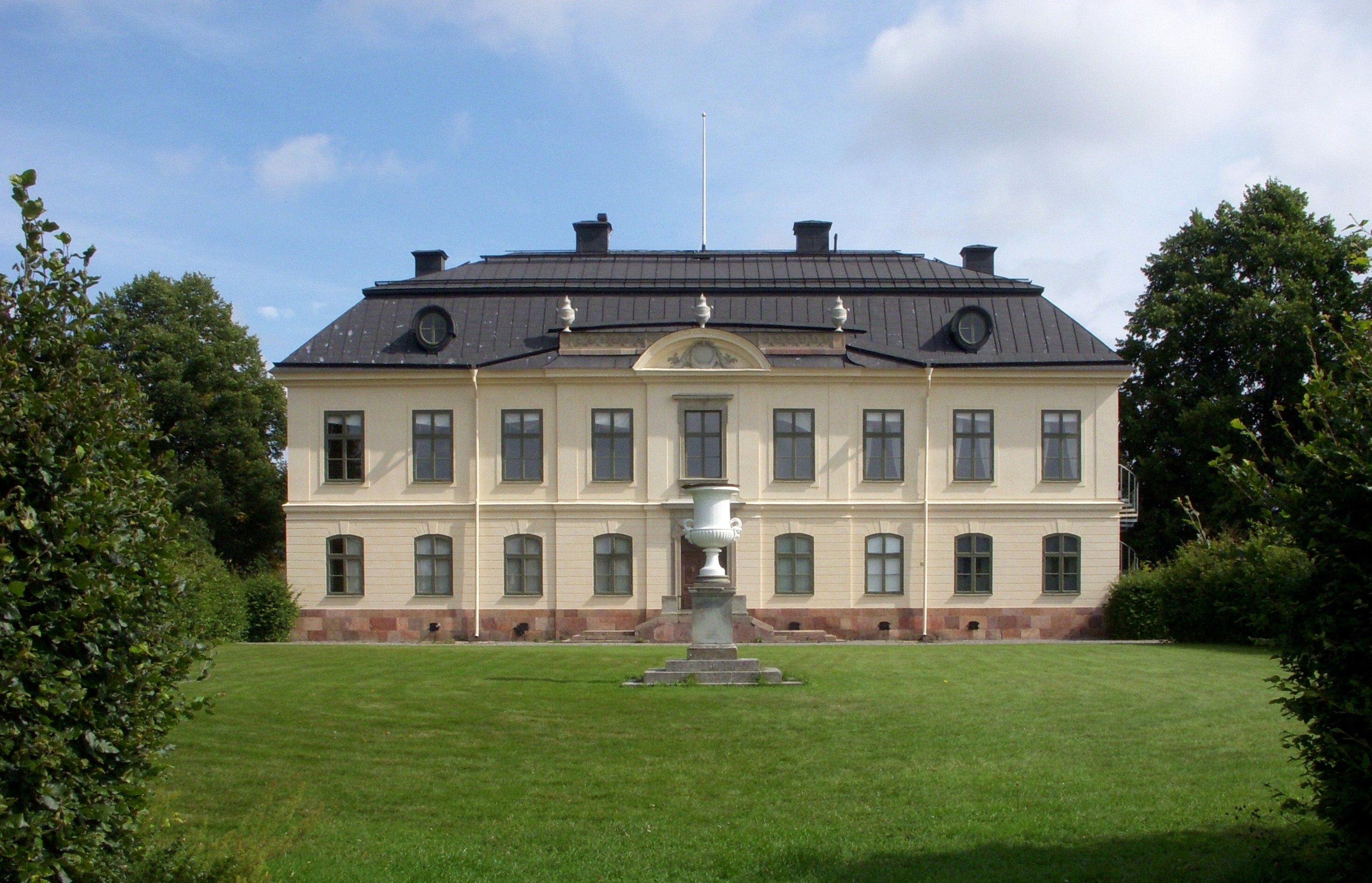
- Sturehov Manor, garden façade

Site information
- Type: Manor
- Open to the public: Yes

Location
- Coordinates: 59°15′28.4″N 17°45′31.2″E

Site history
- Built by: Johan Liljencrantz (owner); Carl Fredrik Adelcrantz (architect)

Sturehov Manor (Swedish: Sturehovs slott; sometimes Sturehof) is a manor house in Botkyrka Municipality, a suburb of Stockholm, Sweden. The manor contains well-preserved 18th-century interiors.

== History ==
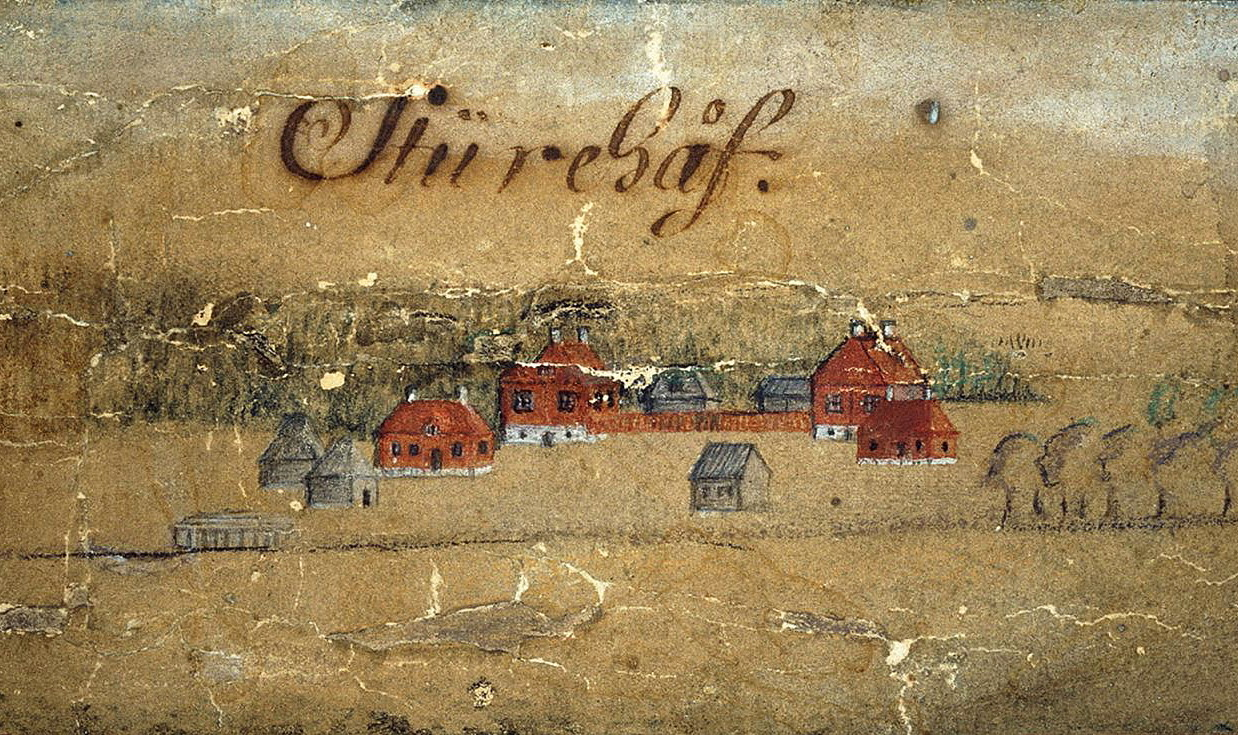
Sturehov as depicted on a map dated 1689

Sturehov is located in an area which has been inhabited for a long time. In the Middle Ages, a small hamlet called Averhulta lay here, owned at one time by the head of the royal council, Bo Jonsson, and later by the Sture family. Sturehov derives its name from statesman Svante Stensson Sture, who seems to have been the first owner of the estate as such; the name was changed from Averhulta in his honour in the 1680s. In 1562 he acquired the land in an exchange with the Crown. The estate stayed in the Sture family until the death of Ebba Mauritzdotter Leijonhufvud, née Sture, after whose death it passed to statesman Johan Oxenstierna. Johan Oxenstierna's widow, Margareta Brahe, sold the estate to military commander Carl Gustaf Wrangel. Subsequently it belonged to several other families from the Swedish nobility, until it was bought in 1778 by Johan Liljencrantz, who held a position similar to that of a finance minister in the government of Gustav III. Johan Liljencrantz commissioned the building of the presently visible manor house and gardens. After the death of Liljencrantz the estate was sold again, and passed through different hands until it in 1899 was sold to Stockholm Municipality. The manor had suffered neglect and disrepair for most of the 19th and early 20th centuries. It underwent a renovation in 1954–59 in which the 18th century interiors were restored, resulting in a state of perfection which may never have existed in the original buildings.

== Architecture ==
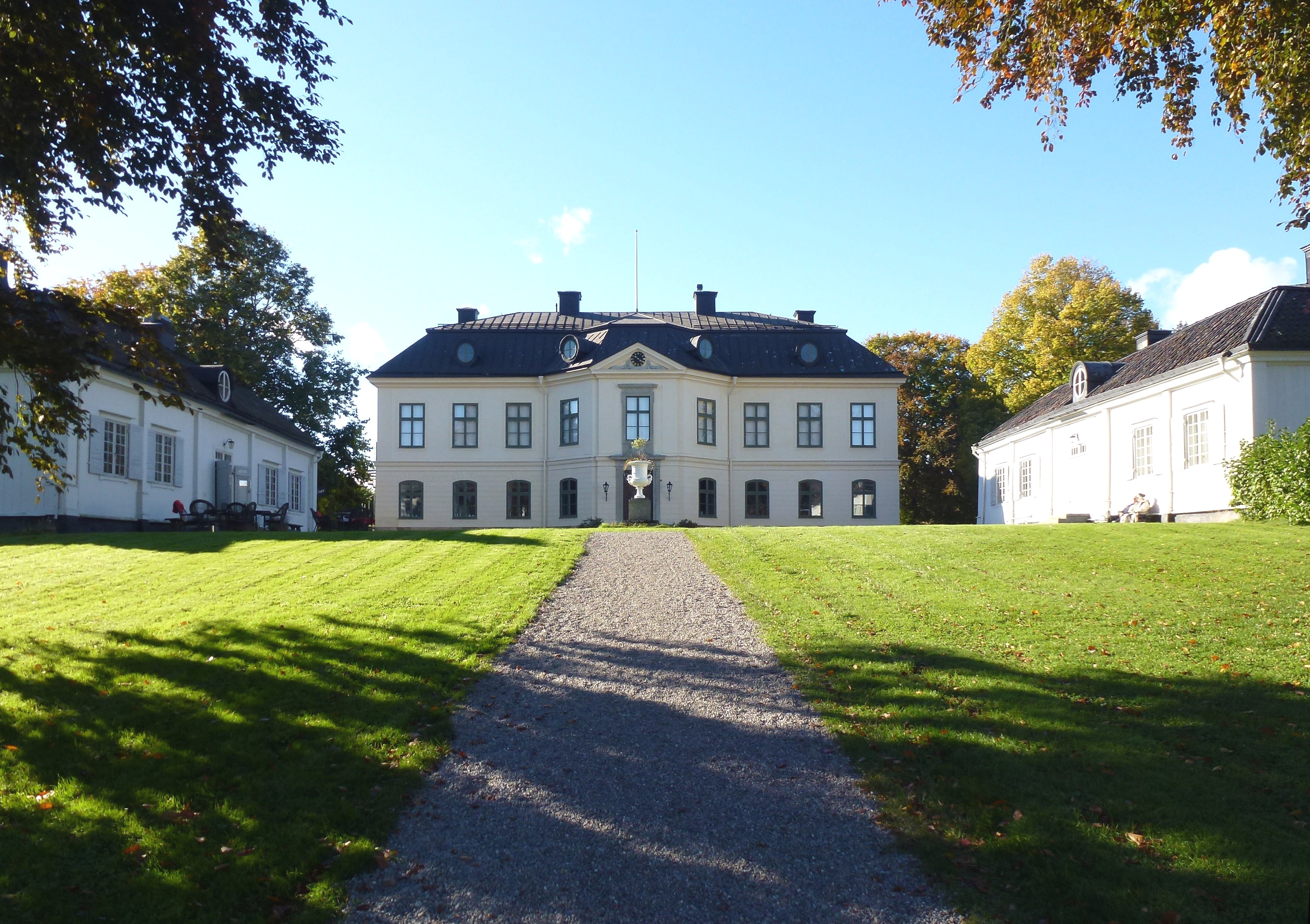
The front courtyard

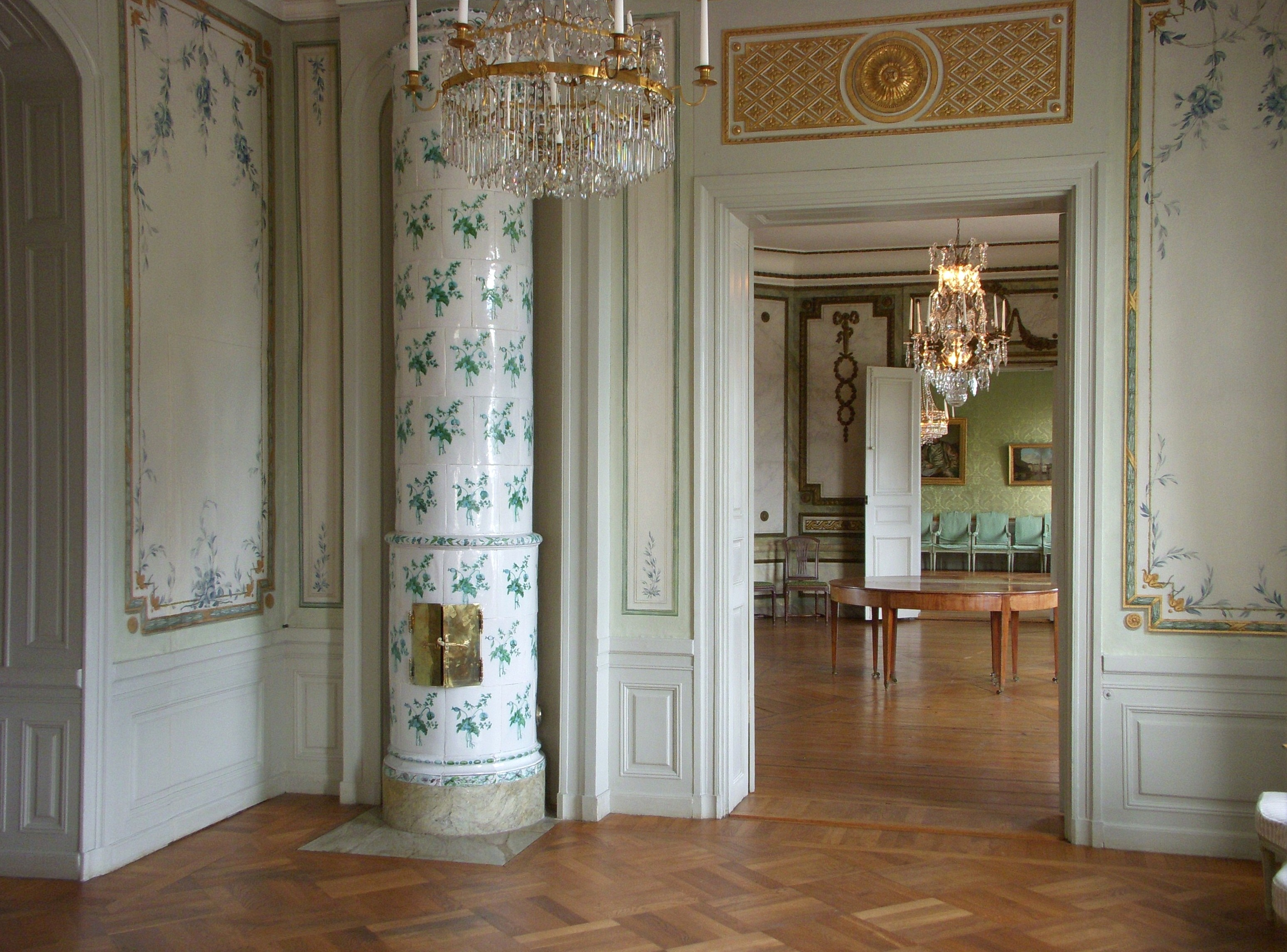
Interior on the first, main floor

The main building dates from the late 18th century, and was probably finished in 1781. It was designed by Carl Fredrik Adelcrantz. The two wings are earlier, dating from the 17th century. In addition, a number of cottages (so-called torps) that belonged to the estate are located further afield.

The main building has been described as one of the most beautiful and most well-preserved manor houses from the reign of Gustav III, and "of the highest quality". The building is a rectangular, two-storey building. On the façade facing the front courtyard, the centre of the building protrudes in a three-sided extension. Above the portal, the coat of arms of the Liljencrantz family is sculpted. The façade facing the garden side is straight, but with the central part pronounced by a shallow avant-corps surmounted by a low attic crowned by urns. The main floor is distinguished by its larger windows.

Inside, the ground floor was designed to house kitchens and simpler living quarters. The first, main floor displays an unusually rich and well-preserved décor. In the centre of the floor is an octagonal dining room designed in a rather strict Neoclassical style: green and grey faux marble wall paintings with golden festoon-like decoration. Above the doors are painted reliefs depicting Mercury, Venus and Ceres. The cocklestove was made by the Marieberg cocklestove factory; Johan Liljencrantz was the main owner of the factory and seventeen of only approximately thirty known such stoves are located in Sturehov manor. The cocklestove in the so-called yellow antechamber, also on the first floor, is generally considered to be the most accomplished cocklestove in Sweden. In total, seven main rooms occupy the first floor, all richly embellished in a style ranging from late Rococo to Neoclassicism. The manor has also been furnished with furniture, art and objets d'art from the epoch, and it houses among other things sculptures by Tobias Sergel, a piano by John Broadwood and furniture by Georg Haupt.

The wings are also decorated, albeit much less luxuriously and with decoration much older; they contain landscapes dating from the Baroque period painted onto the wooden walls (as a common substitute in Sweden for verdure tapestries.

== Gallery ==
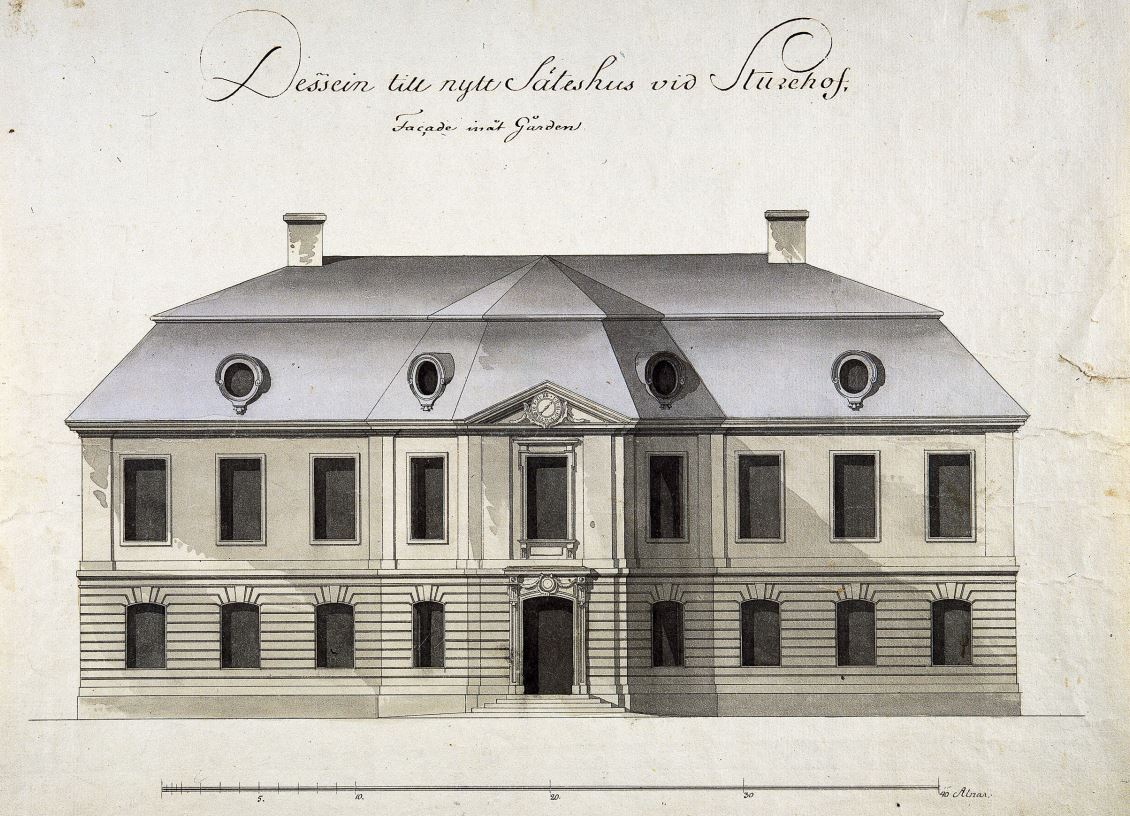
Adelcrantz' design for the garden façade

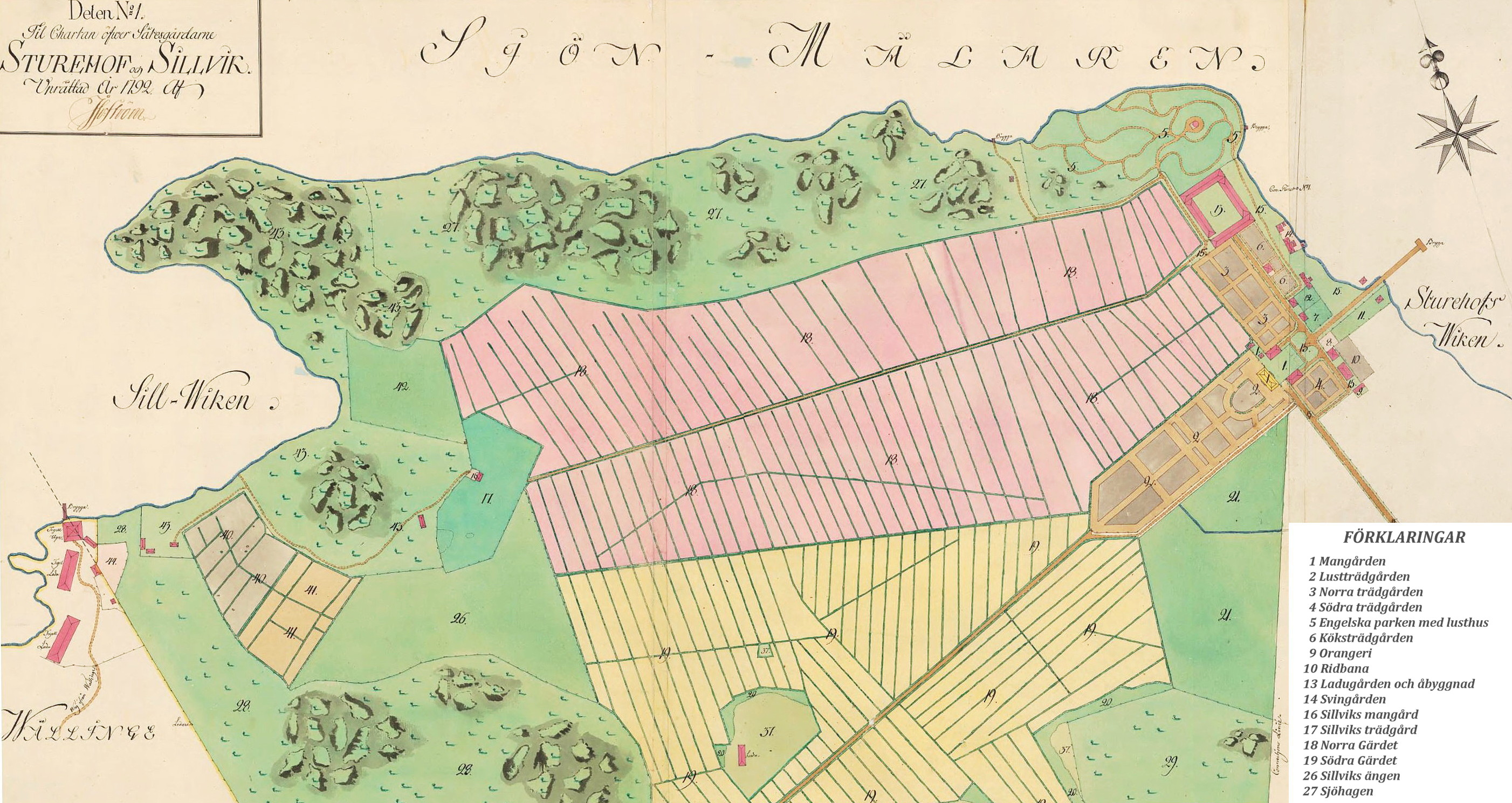
Map of the estate, 1780

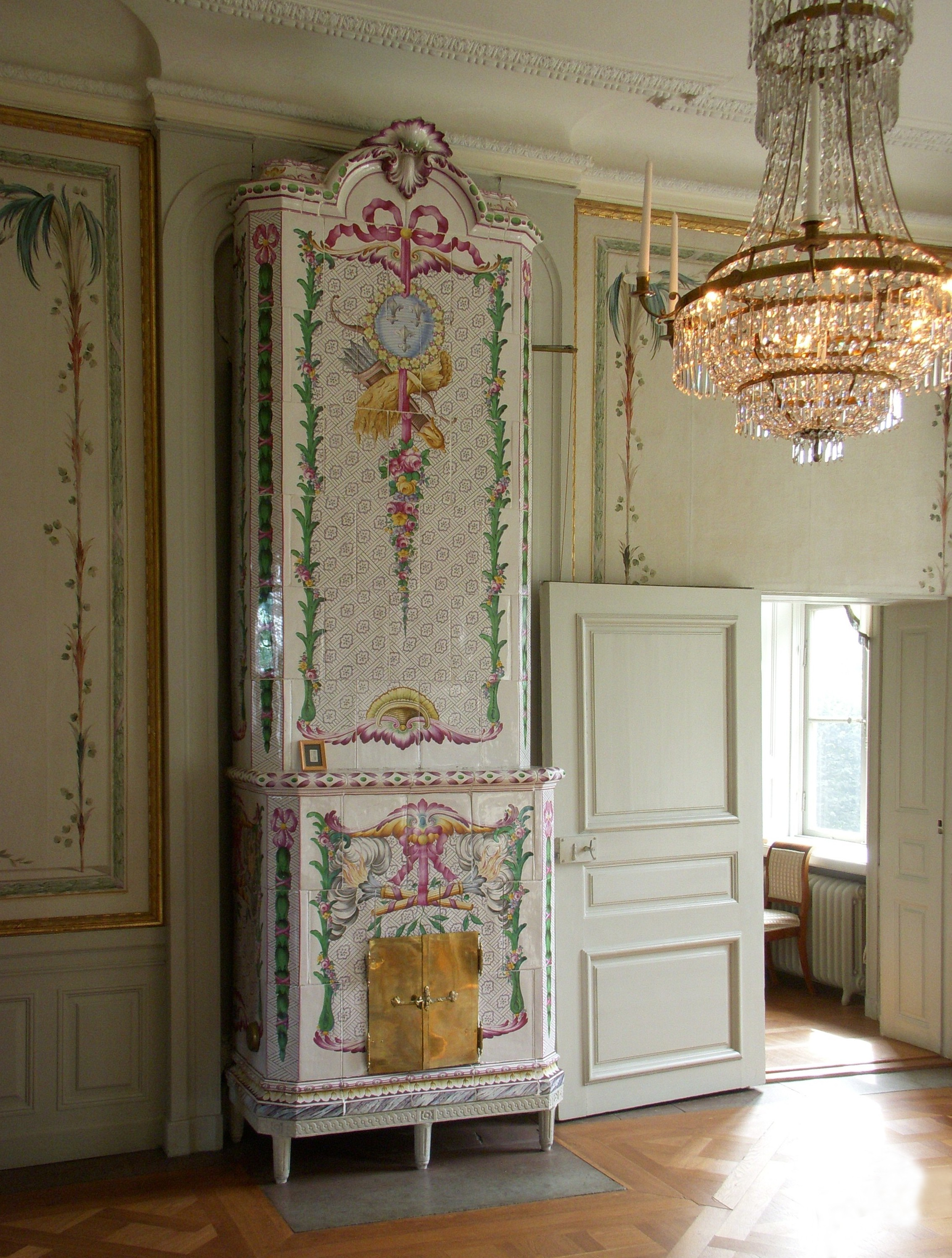
The cocklestove in the yellow antechamber

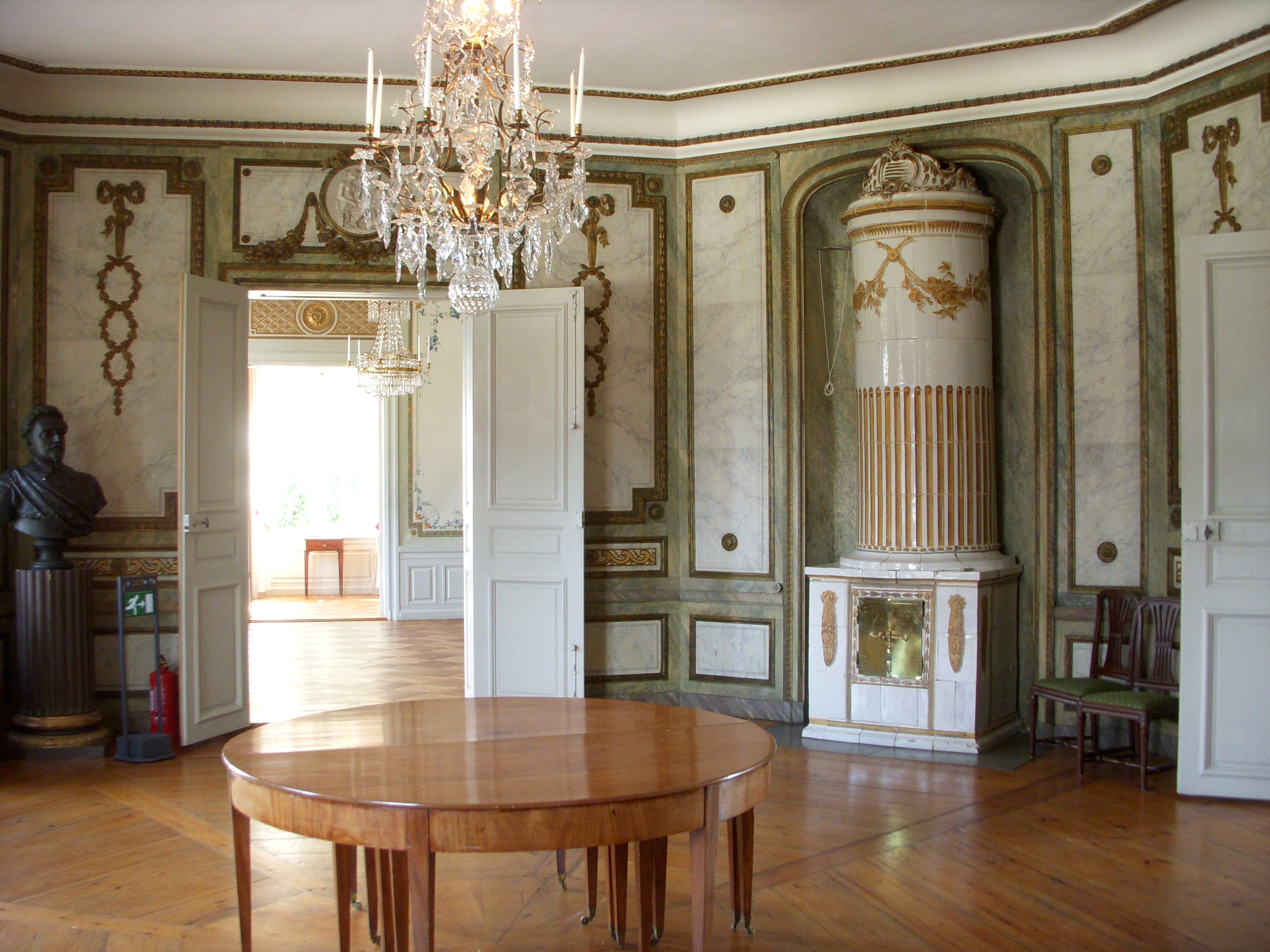
The octagonal dining room

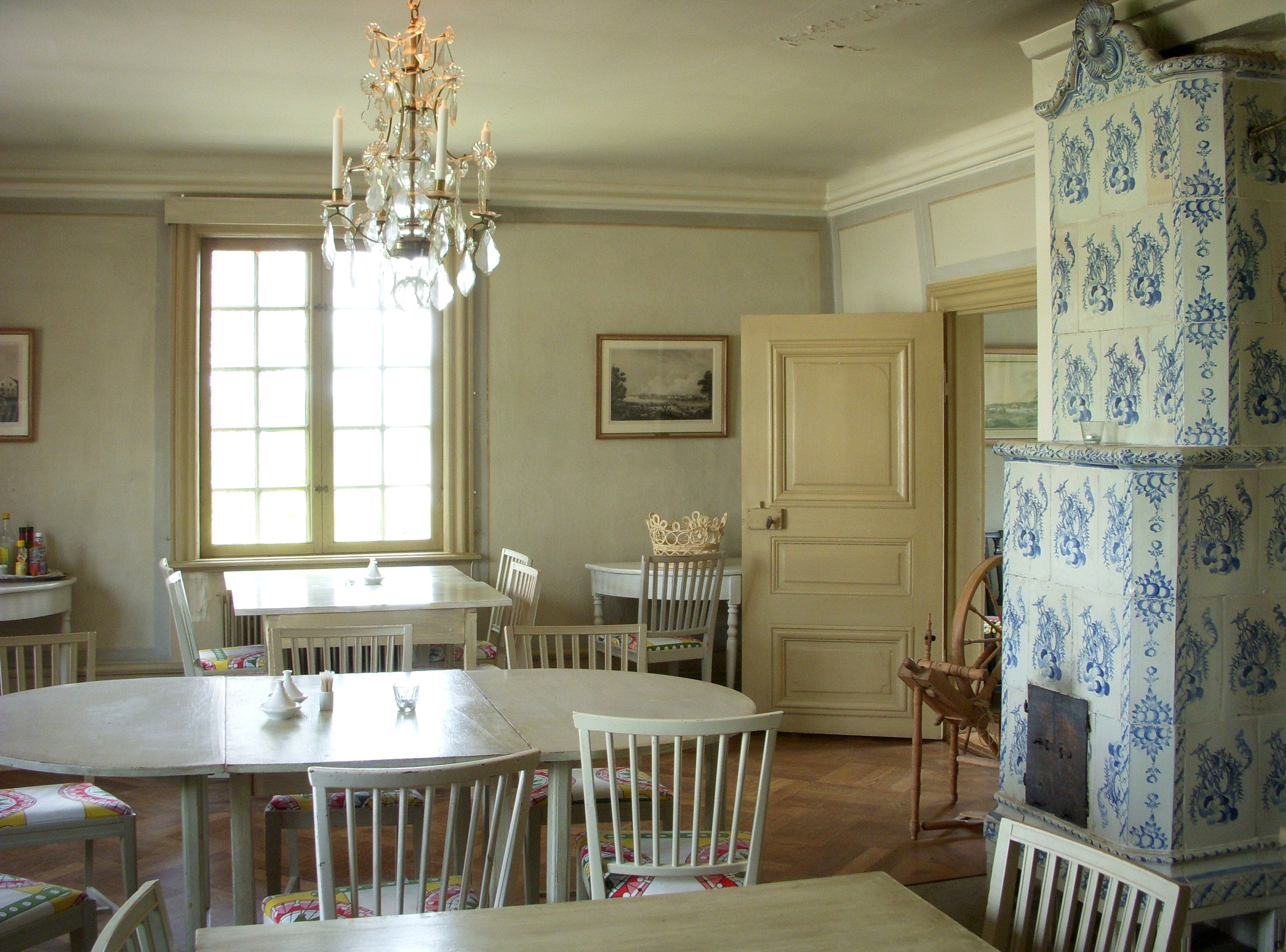
Inside one of the wings

== See also ==
- List of castles in Sweden
