= Leonora Duarte =

Flemish composer (1610–1678?)

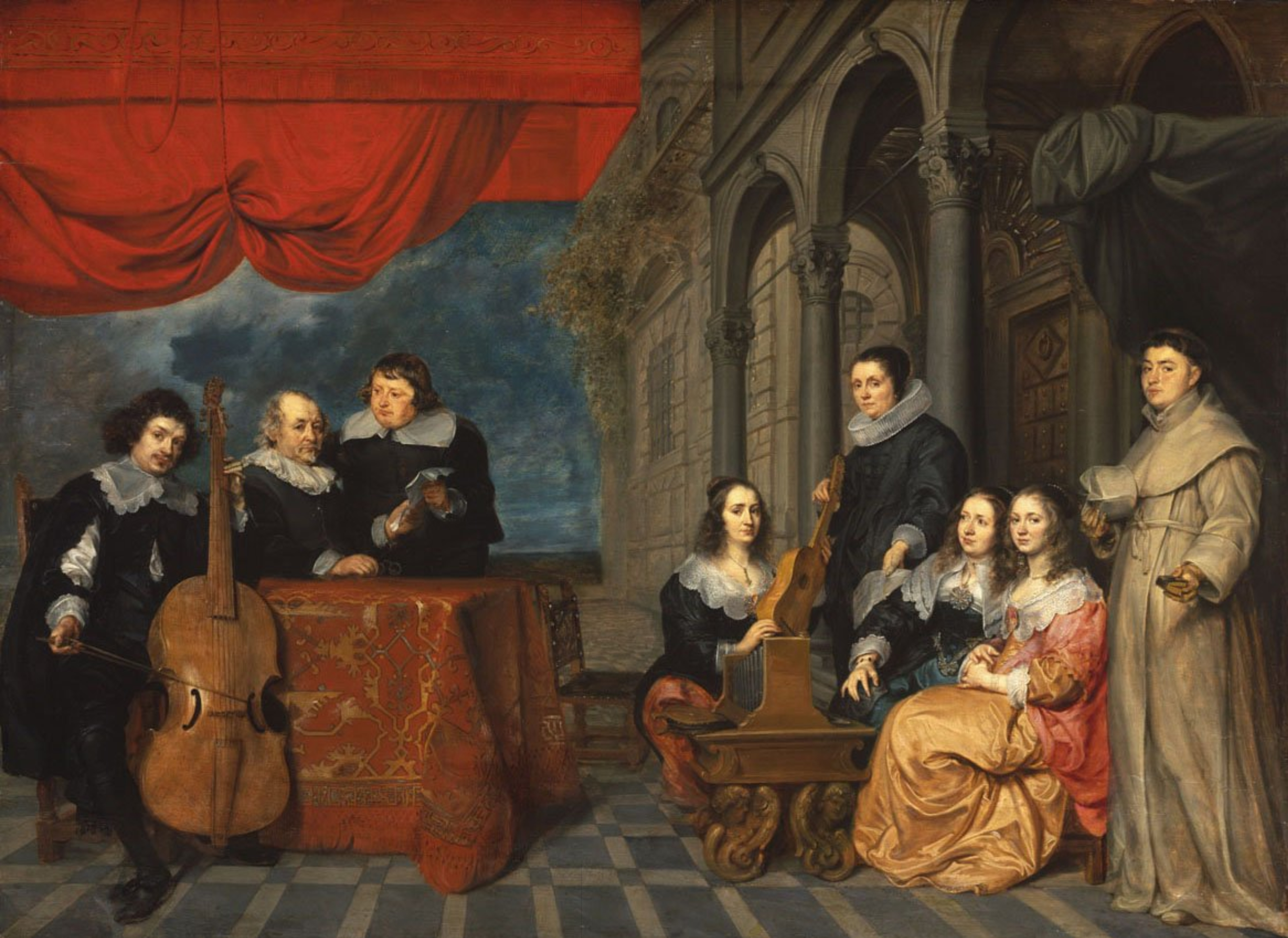
Gonzales Coques - Portrait of the Duarte family

Leonora Duarte (1610 – 1678?) was a Baroque Flemish composer and musician, born in Antwerp. She belonged to a wealthy Portuguese-Jewish family who were major patrons of the arts and music. She was baptized into the Catholic faith on 28 July 1610. Duarte composed seven sinfonias which are the only known pieces of music written for viol by a woman in the 17th century.

== Life ==
=== Family ===
Leonora Duarte's paternal grandparents, Diego Duarte I (c. 1544-1626) and Leonora Rodrigues (c.1565-1632) originally lived in Lisbon, Portugal until they were forced to flee during the Portuguese Inquisition. They most likely arrived in Antwerp around the year 1571. Practicing Judaism in Antwerp was illegal, so the family became conversos, meaning they outwardly acted as Catholics while secretly maintaining their Jewish faith and practices.

Leonora was the first-born child of Gaspar Duarte (c.1584-1653) and Catharina Rodrigues (1584-1644), and she had three sisters and two brothers; Diego II (1612-1691), Catharina (1614-1678), Gaspar II (1616-c.1685), Francisca (1619-1678), and Isabella (1620-1685).

Gaspar I played the harpsichord and was musically trained (as was Catharina), although professionally he was a successful jewelry merchant who specialized in diamonds. Gaspar was also very close friends with renowned harpsichord makers, Ruckers and Couchet. The Duarte family residence at the Meir in Antwerp was a well-known center for music and the visual arts. The correspondence of Leonora’s father and her brother Diego with Constantijn Huygens shows that there were frequent contacts with the cultural élite of the Low Countries and England, including Huygens himself and his sons Constantijn and Christiaan, Dutch poet and artist Anna Roemers Visscher, and William Cavendish, Duke of Newcastle. In 1644 Nicholas Lanier visited the family when he was in voluntary exile, and in 1653 Anne and Joseph de la Barre paid a visit when traveling from Paris to Stockholm.

In addition to his business in jewels, Gaspar and Diego were also heavily involved in the collection, trading, and commissioning of art.

Growing up as converso in her family’s home, there seemed to be an interesting balance of Leonora's understanding her identity, both as a Jewish woman at core, but also as a Jewish woman composer during the Baroque period. On one hand, conversos were closely observed, while on the other hand, it seems her family, especially her father, made it be known that regardless of their practices, their family was successful and otherwise great patrons of the arts and culture.

=== Early life ===
Duarte received a superb musical education that included instruction on viol, virginals, and lute, as well as lessons in composition. She was familiar with the music and styles of both English composers such as John Bull (1562/63-1628) and those from Continental Europe, as well as local Flemish music. Their family home was known for a remarkable appreciation for guests and personal musical performances by all members of their family.

The entirety of the Duarte family was trained in music, as evidenced by visitor Captain William Swann (1619-1678), who described his evening in the Duarte home,

For Monsieur de Warty [sic] and his daughters I have heard to the fulle. Indeed they make a fyne consort and harmony for luts, viols, virginals and voyces. I doubt not but you will fynde great contentment by hearing them.

The house was filled with a variety of high-quality musical instruments, including at least five harpsichords and virginals, as well as a claviorgan, a combination of a harpsichord and an organ. Leonora's brother brother Diego set to music various poems by William Cavendish (1650s) and later the psalm paraphrases of Godeau (1673–85), which he dedicated to Constantijn Huygens. None of these works, possibly all for one voice with basso continuo, has survived today.

=== Death ===
It is unknown what month, or even year, of Leonora’s death but can be assumed around 1678. Leonora was one of three daughters of the Duarte family to die from Antwerp’s plagues. The year of her death is supported by city records of the event.

Her brother Diego died in 1691 without successors, which ended the Antwerp branch of the Duarte family.

== Seven Sinfonias ==
Sinfonia à5, No.1 Decimi toni, Oxford. Christ College, Mus.Ms.429 (ca.1625-1650)

Sinfonia à5, No.2 de Duodesimi toni, Oxford. Christ College, Mus.Ms.429 (ca.1625-1650)

Sinfonia à5, No.3 Primi toni, Oxford. Christ College, Mus.Ms.429 (ca.1625-1650)

Sinfonia à5, No.4, Seconda Parte, Oxford. Christ College, Mus.Ms.429 (ca.1625-1650)

Sinfonia à5, No.5 Secondi toni, Oxford. Christ College, Mus.Ms.429 (ca.1625-1650)

Sinfonia à5, No.6 Octavi toni [sopra Sol mi fa sol la], Oxford. Christ College, Mus.Ms.429 (ca.1625-1650)

Sinfonia à5, No.7 Terti toni, Oxford. Christ College, Mus.Ms.429 (ca.1625-1650)
Performed by Phillip W. Serna, Treble, Tenor & Bass Viols

As a young composer, Leonora Duarte wrote a set of seven abstract fantasies, written for five viols. These seven short pieces are in the late Jacobean style and called ‘Symphonies’.

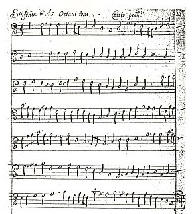
Seven Sinfonias for five viols (page 33 of the manuscript Oxford, Christ Church College, Mus. ms. 429)

Her father, Gaspar, likely wrote out the titles of each Sinfonia, yet we do not know who copied the music. Given the frequency with which women were tasked with music copying, it is possible that Leonora copied the works, herself.

Leonora was capable of combining her compositional skills with the latest ideas and theory in Italian and French music due to the rich traffic of visitors from all parts of Europe that regularly made it to the Duarte’s house on the Meir. Influences can be noted and applied, regarding the Duarte family and their guests, who at one time included Dirk Sweelinck, son of Jan Pieterszoon Sweelinck, the Dutch composer whose work helped mark the transition between the Renaissance and Baroque periods of music.

The music of the seven Sinfonias shows the clear intersection of different styles of European music. Sinfonias Nos. 1, 2, 3, and 7 are written in free counterpoint, while Nos. 4, 5, and 6 use source material. All seven are written for five parts, with two high treble voices, two middle voices, and a bass.

Sinfonia No. 4 resembles English fantasia writing, including the practice of composing over top of a cantus firmus.

Sinfonia No. 6 is a reworking of Girolamo Frescobaldi's (1583-1643) four-part Recercar Settimo from his Recercari et canzoni Franzese (1615). Duarte's reimagining preserves Frescobaldi's music with minimal changes, although she omits measures 35-mid 64, and adds the second treble part to make a fifth voice.

== Legacy ==
Leonora Duarte was never commissioned by the church or the court over her lifetime, but stood out in her musical family due to her compositional talent. Her seven short sinfonias reflect the creation and compositional workings of Baroque music within the domestic sphere, where it would have originally been heard and performed.

While the Duarte house on the Meir was demolished in the 19th century, one can visit the house of a neighbor of theirs, the Snijders & Rockox House. It was turned into a museum, with a music room featuring period instruments and sheet music from Leonora, as the Duartes and their neighbors were known to share music.

The manuscripts for the Sinfonias are held at the Christ Church College Library at Oxford University, although for many years they were mistakenly catalogued as being composed by "Leon Duarte."
