= Barbara Broadwood =

Barbara Broadwood (née Shudi) (10 February 1749 – 1776) kept a book of accounts for her father and husband's harpsichord making business, Shudi and Broadwood.

Barbara Broadwood née Shudi, daughter of Burkat Shudi, harpsichord maker, and Catharine Wild, was born on 10th February 1749, and baptized four weeks later on 12 March 1749 at St James Piccadilly. On 2 January 1769 she married John Broadwood, foreman and partner in her father's harpsichord making business. After her father died, the business was passed on to Broadwood. Shudi died in 1776 and was buried at Whitefield Memorial Church on 12 July 1776, the same day as Elizabeth Broadwood, probably a daughter, aged 11 months.

== Shudi's role in Shudi and Broadwood ==
Shudi's kept a book of accounts for Broadwood that included payments to workmen, tuning appointments, instrument hires and lists of groceries. Shudi was the first to use this book, she opened the book with the statement this book belongs to Barbara Broadwood. She followed this with a list of her husband's clothes and then her own between this she entered a list of names headed by Dutchess of Marlborough and a list of foodstuffs.

Blank pages in the middle of the book suggest that, following her death in 1776, her role in the firm was not immediately replaced.
