= Carl Fredrik Adelcrantz =

Swedish architect and civil servant (1716–1796)

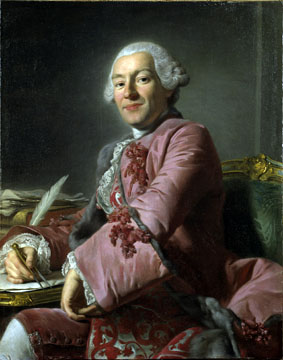
Alexander Roslin's portrait of Carl Fredrik Adelcrantz made during the latter's stay in Paris in 1754 (in the collection of the Royal Swedish Academy of Arts, Stockholm to which it was bequested by Adelcrantz)

Carl Fredrik Adelcrantz (30 January 1716 – 1 March 1796) was a Swedish architect and civil servant. Adelcrantz's style developed from a rococo influenced by Carl Hårleman, the leading architect in Sweden in the early years of his career, to a classical idiom influenced by the stylistic developments in France in the mid-to-late 18th century. As överintendent, he headed the royal and public building works from 1767 until his retirement in 1795.

== Family and childhood ==
Adelcrantz was born in 1716 in Stockholm and was the son of the architect Göran Josuæ Adelcrantz, who had changed his name from Törnqvist at his ennoblement four years earlier. As a student in Uppsala, Göran Josua Törnqvist had been a member of the student theatre troupe known as Den Swänska Theatren that later performed in the Lejonkulan theatre in Stockholm. He came into the employment of Nicodemus Tessin the Younger in 1697, the year the disastrous fire at the old Castle of Stockholm took place and the planning for the new palace began. Törnqvist had studied architecture before this and may have been discovered by Tessin for his scenographies. Göran Josua Adelcrantz remained in the shadow of the dominant Tessin; his most significant work was the cupola for the Katarina Church in Stockholm.

Through his marriage in 1711 to the young widow Anna Maria Köhnmann, daughter of a wealthy businessman, Törnqvist's finances improved considerably. Among other things, he became the possessor of the manor of Signhildsberg near Sigtuna. The next year Charles XII ennobled him, on the recommendation of his patron Tessin. Born in Stockholm, Carl Fredrik was the third child of the marriage.

== Studies and early career ==
The elder Adelcrantz did not intend for Carl Fredrik to follow in his professional footsteps; he had, for political reasons, lost his positions as court architect and city architect of Stockholm in 1727, and, under the circumstances, he regarded architecture as too insecure a profession for his son. After a short time of study in Uppsala, Carl Fredrik began his career as a low-level civil servant in the Kammarrevisionen court (the future Kammarrätten, the Administrative Court of Appeals in Stockholm).

Göran Josua Adelcrantz did not attempt to suppress the artistic inclination of his son. Carl Fredrik took lessons in drawing and assisted his father in some tasks; he designed an altar for the Katarina Church that was under reconstruction after its first fire, and a tower for the Finnish Church that never came to execution. Half a year after his father's death in 1739, Carl Fredrik Adelcrantz left his employment in Kammarrevisionen, and on 11 August 1739 he left Stockholm for France and Italy. Although his notes from the journey have been lost, it is known that he spent two years in Paris and several months in Rome. In December 1741, while he was still in Rome, Adelcrantz was given a position within the palace construction project. Count Carl Gustaf Tessin, to whom he had turned for a recommendation, had still to become convinced that his talent equaled that of his father, but Carl Hårleman made sure that Adelcrantz would get the appointment. In late summer 1743, he started on his return journey to Sweden, arriving in Stockholm in November.

== Courtier and architect ==
Beside his work in the palace construction, he was also given the court title of hovjunkare and was attached to the court of Crown Prince Adolf Fredrik and his consort Louisa Ulrika, the sister of Frederick the Great. Adelcrantz would remain in the shadow of Hårleman for several years more, spending the 1740s as his assistant in the work on the Royal Palace in Stockholm that had been under continuous construction since the old Castle burnt down in 1697. He won the trust of Hårleman who recommended Adelcrantz for a mission to Italy to recruit artists for the palace project, and secured the necessary funding for the journey, enabling Adelcrantz to leave in 1750, accompanied by the royal sculptor Jacques Philippe Bouchardon (a brother of Edmé Bouchardon). The stay in Italy was a failure as far as recruiting new artists went, as the ones he wanted turned out to be far to expensive, but gave a rich yield in the form of architectural notes, books and art objects. Adelcrantz was back in Stockholm in late summer 1751. When Hårleman suddenly died in 1753, he was succeeded as överintendent (see below) by Carl Johan Cronstedt, and Adelcrantz was given Cronstedt's position as hovintendent.

The office of överintendent had been created for Nicodemus Tessin the Younger at the start of the planning for the new royal palace in 1697, with statutes modelled on the French royal office of the surintendant who was responsible for the royal building works, and extended during Colbert's time to heading the royal manufacture of tapestries and porcelain. In the absence of royal factories of the French type, the Swedish office may in actuality been more closely have resembled the subordinate office of the premier architecte. The task of the office was later extended to all public building projects, including churches.

At the end of 1753, Adelcrantz was again given a foreign mission, now to Paris. In accordance with his instructions, he sent home a large number of models and engravings to be used for interior details in the latest fashion. He also contracted Pierre Hubert L'Archevêque as a successor to J. P. Bouchardon, who had died in December 1753. In Paris, Adelcrantz sat for the portrait by Alexander Roslin that he later bequested to the Swedish Academy of Arts. Adelcrantz and Roslin may already have met in Stockholm before the latter left for the continent, or in Italy a few years before, but the stay in Paris appears to have been the beginning of a long friendship and an extensive but now-lost correspondence. The diary that he is known to have kept during his journey was mentioned as sold at auction in 1831, but also appears to be lost. After his return, he worked on the furnishing of the Palace which was finished in November, when he was appointed a Knight of the Order of the Polar Star. The same year also saw his election as a member of the Royal Swedish Academy of Sciences.

== Överintendent ==
After Cronstedt left the position of överintendent in 1767, Adelcrantz was appointed his successor. At the time, he had already held the title honoris causa for ten years. With the position came, ex officio, that as president of the Royal Academy of Arts. As a member of the Hats, one of the two dominant groups of the Swedish parliamentary system of the Age of Liberty, he briefly became a target of political bad-will from the side of the other party, the Caps, after their rise to power in the Riksdag of 1771. The coup d'état of the new king, Gustav III, spared him the political fate his father may once have feared for him, and he could undisturbed continue his work both as an architect and as a civil servant. The Academy of Arts received new statutes in 1773, and in 1776 the King granted the office of the överintendent a more complete control of all public building in the country, both as a result of Adelcrantz's initiative.

As a consequence of his journey to Italy and France in 1783-84, the King's stylistic ideals changed in a more radical classicist direction. Adelcrantz adapted to the changing architectural fashions, but younger architects whose sensibilities were more in line with the current trends advanced in the favour of the King, and Adelcrantz found himself increasingly sidelined. In 1787, the 72-year-old architect petitioned the King for permission to retire, giving both his failing health and financial difficulties as reasons. The petition was refused by the King; only in 1795 was Adelcrantz given permission to retire as överintendent, leaving the reins to his successor, Carl Fredrik Fredenheim, on 16 February. He had been active civil servant until his last days in office, and his last architectural design was for an altar for the parish church of Stockholms-Näs, made during these same last days, at the age of 80. He retired as president of the academy of Art a few months later, in June 1795. His last days, until he died in Stockholm in March 1796, was plagued by a painful cancer and increasing financial problems.

== Adelcrantz's development as an architect ==
Adelcrantz's earliest influences came from the Baroque architecture that he could study in the pattern books and engravings in his father's library; his first known design, the altar for the church of Katarina Parish in Stockholm from 1732 is in a Roman Baroque style favoured by Tessin, and may be influenced by an engraving of the similar altar by Carlo Rainaldi in the Chiesa di Gesù e Maria, Rome, depicted in Giovanni Giacomo Rossi's Disegni di vari altari e cappelle nelle chiese di Roma, known to have been owned by the elder Adelcrantz. By the time he came into his own as an architect, about 1750, Swedish design and architecture had been thoroughly penetrated by the French Rococo. Mainly responsible for this was Carl Hårleman, överintendent and Adelcrantz's superior at the work on the Palace, and the dominant architect in his generation in Sweden. Adelcrantz' later architecture followed the trend towards a more classicist approach, one that lost some of the plastic character of the baroque and rococo architecture, instead making buildings into ensembles of distinct architectural elements (such as columns and porticos), often emphasizing geometric shapes.

Adelcrantz' first commissions of significance were the Ulriksdal Palace Theatre and the residential building in Stockholm that he originally designed for his brother-in-law Gustaf Samuel Ruuth (but would later take over himself), both from 1753, the year of Hårleman's death.

== Select designs ==
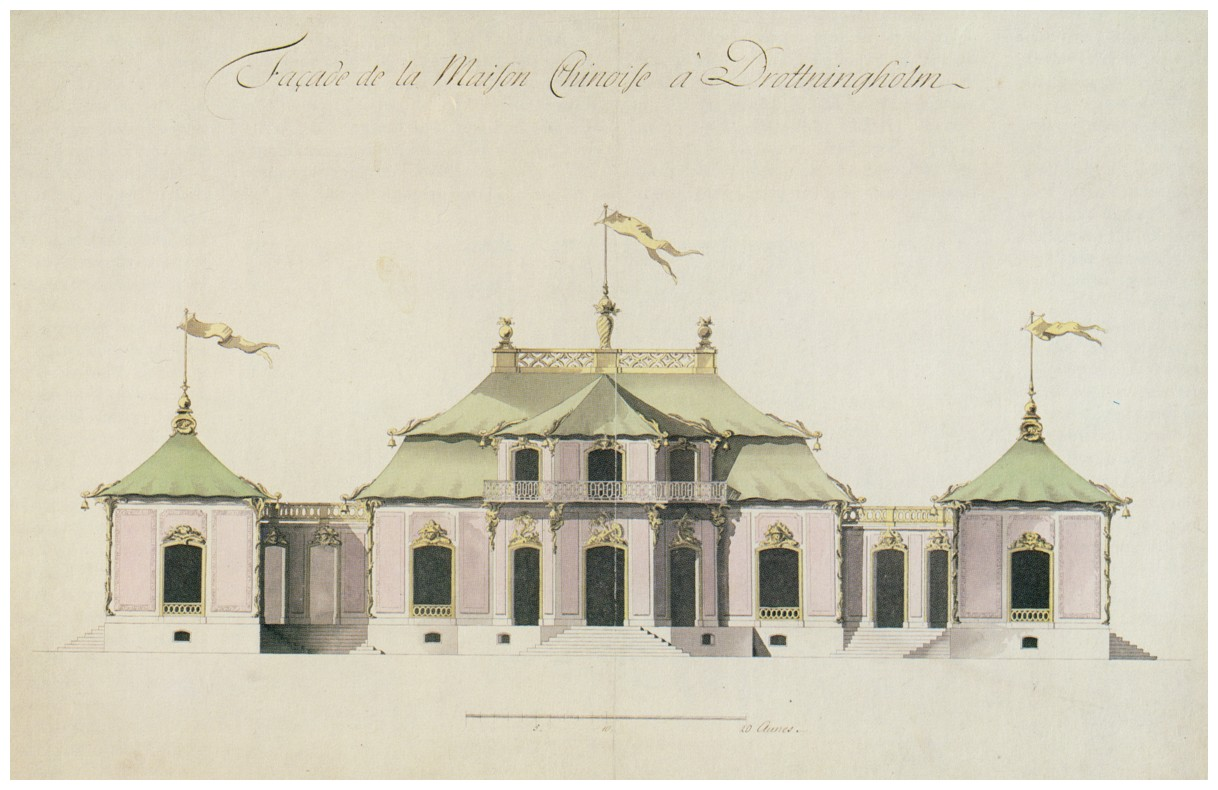
Chinese Pavilion at Drottningholm, 1763

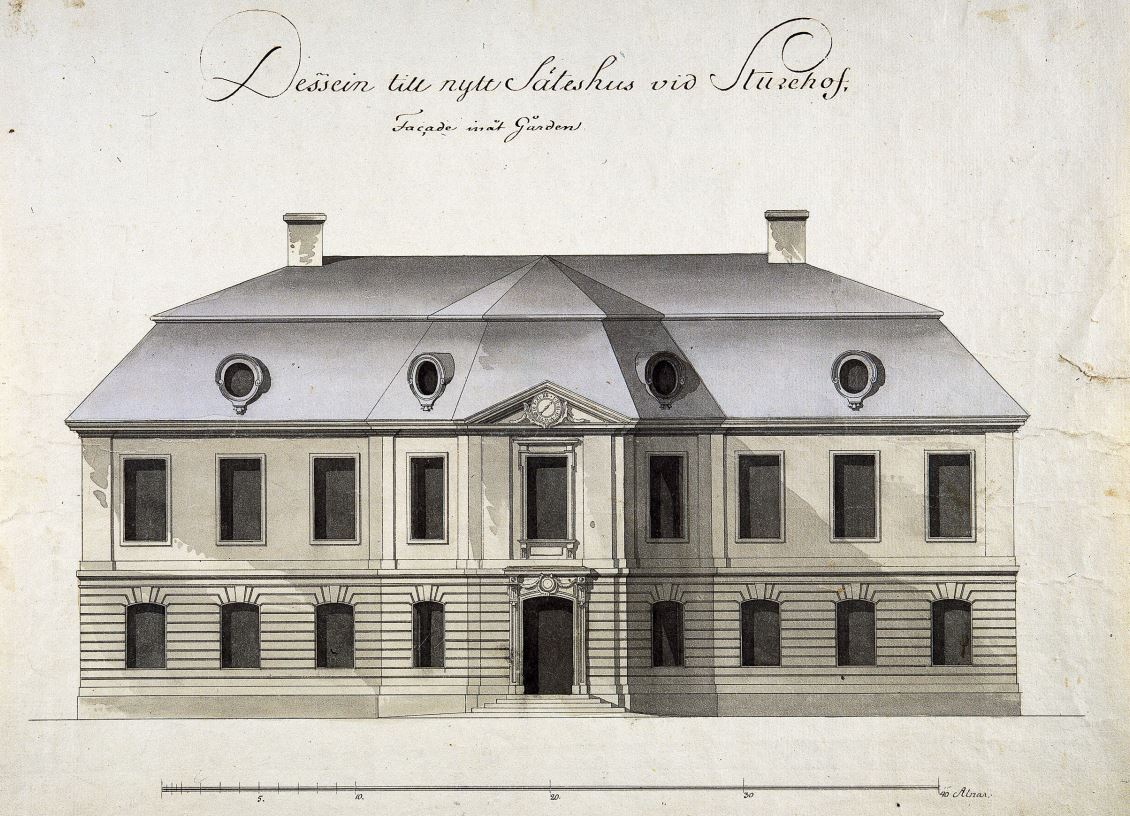
Sturehov Castle, 1780s

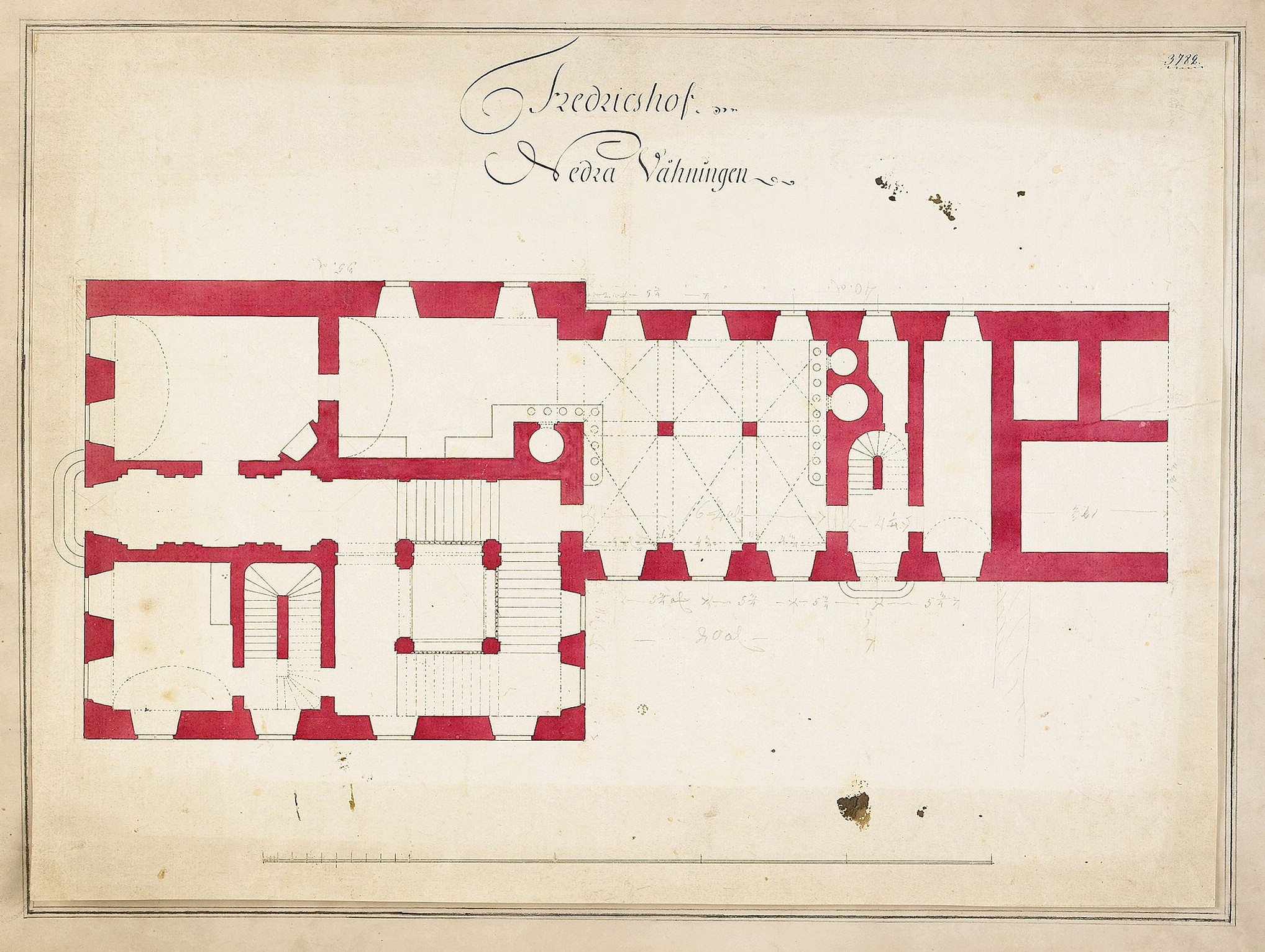
Fredrikshov, 1774

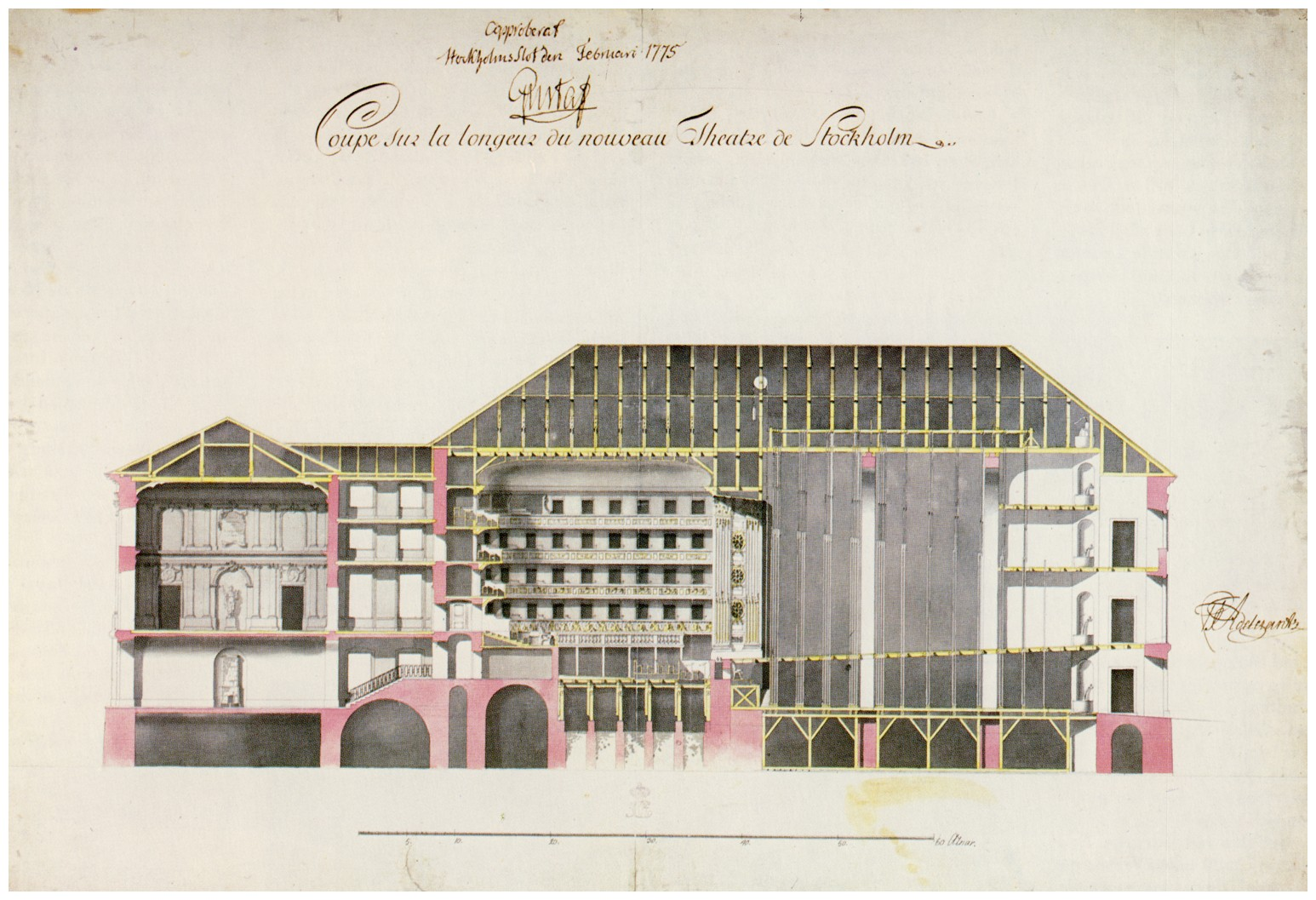
Gustav III Opera house, 1775

== Select buildings ==
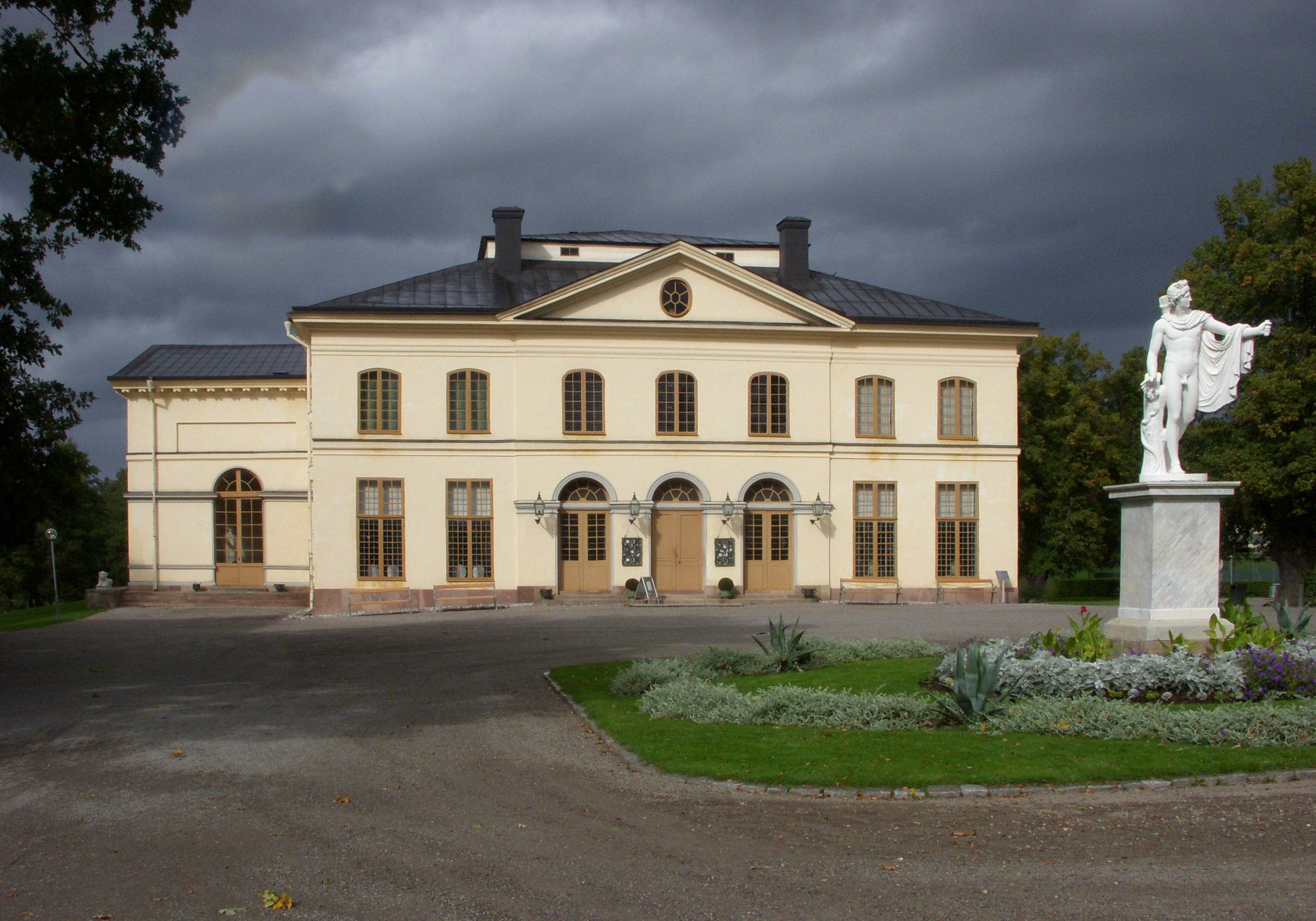
Drottningholm theatre

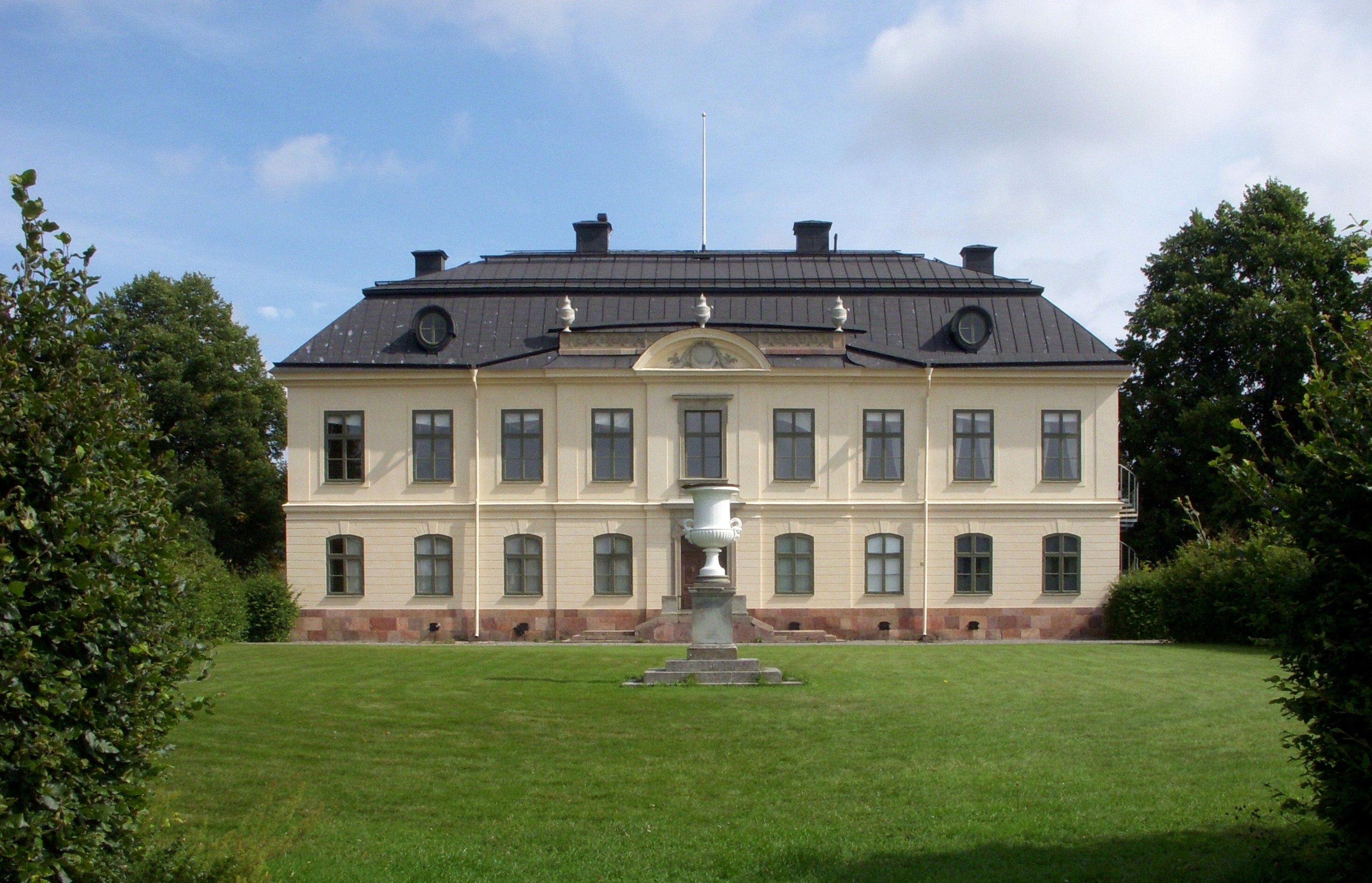
Sturehov Manor

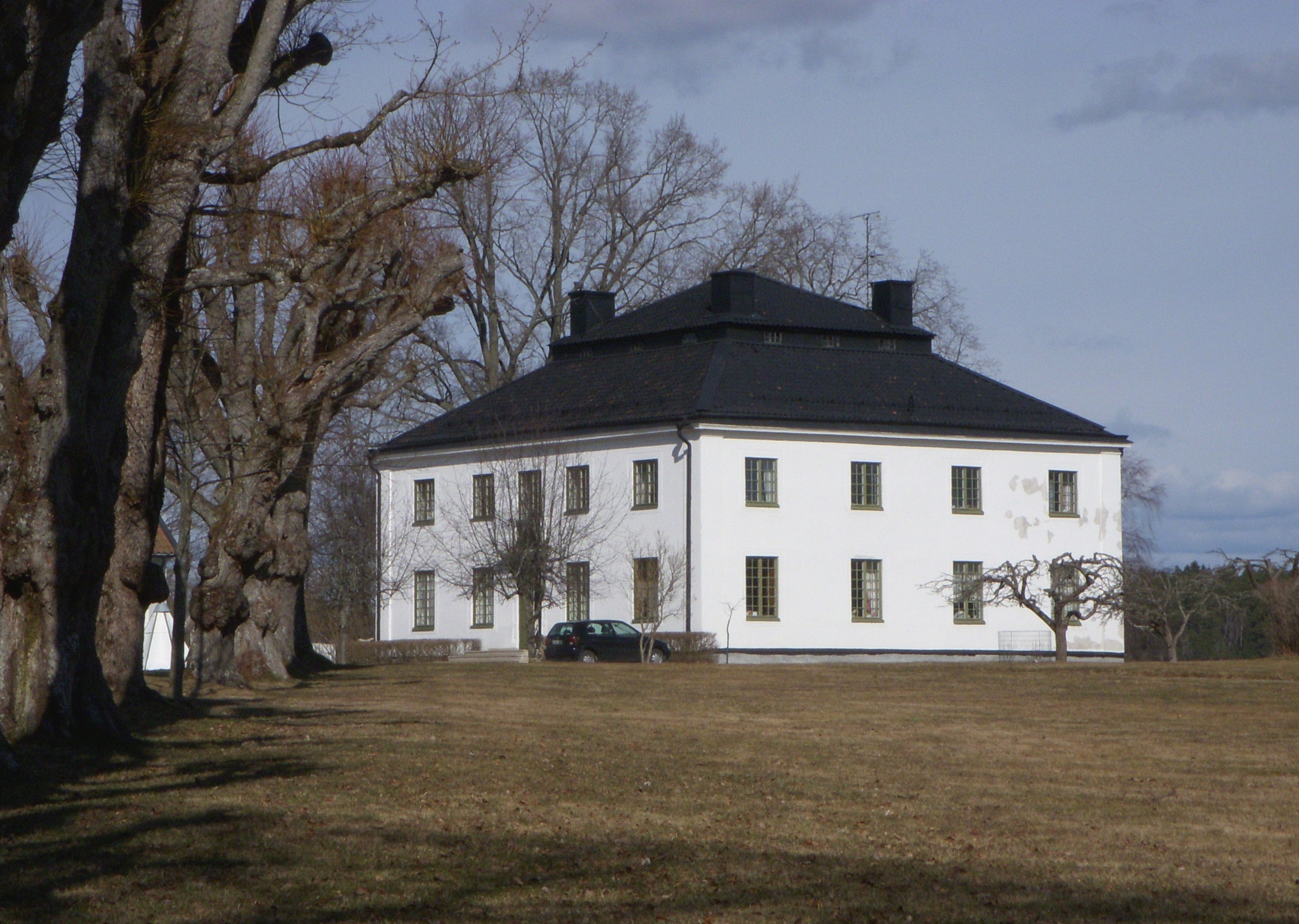
Trångsund mansion

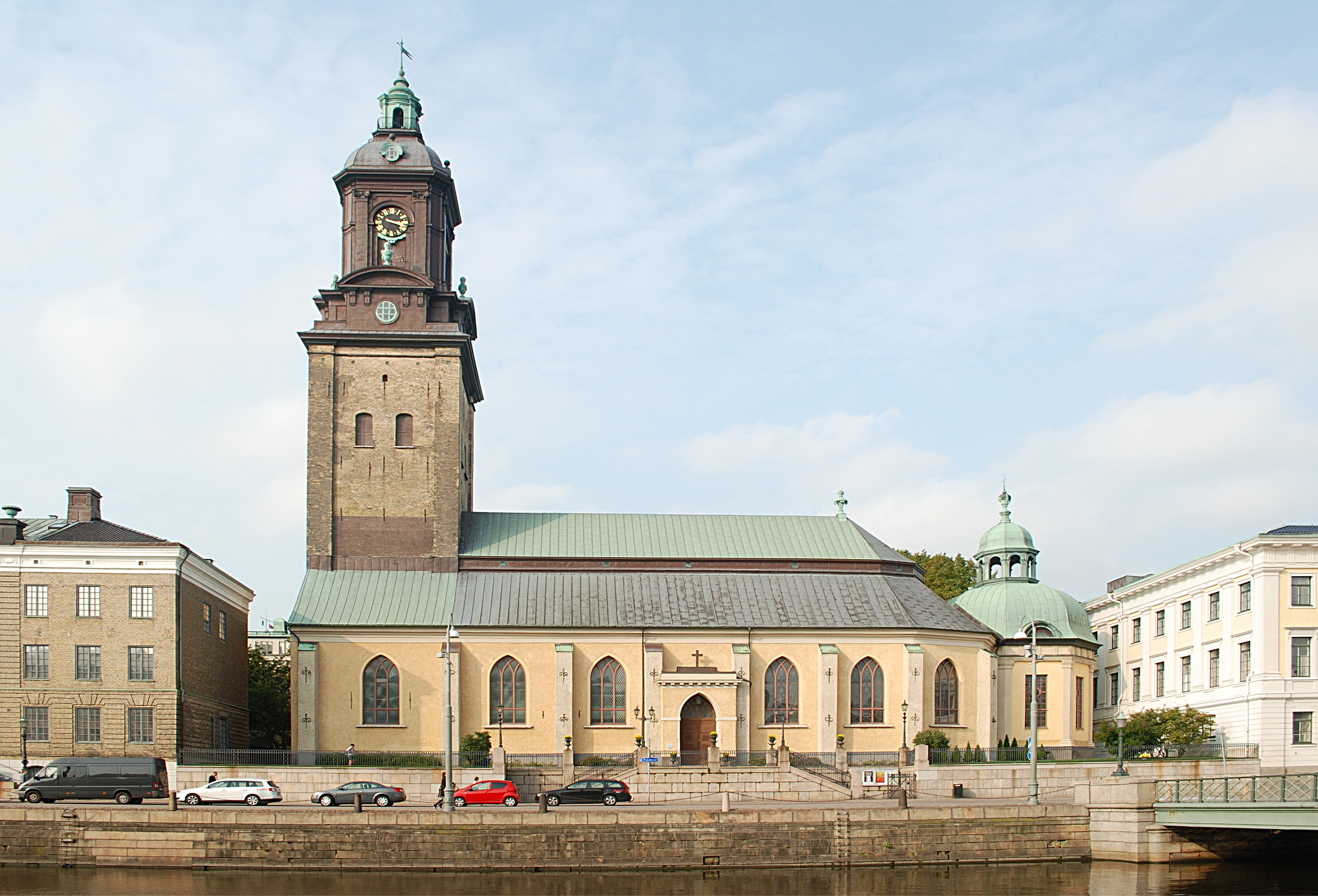
Tyska kyrkan, Göteborg

== Bibliography ==
- Alexander Roslin, ed. Magnus Olausson. Nationalmusei utställningskatalog, 0585-3222; 652. Stockholm: Nationalmuseum, [2007] (ISBN 978-91-7100-771-1.)
- Fogelmarck, Stig: Carl Fredrik Adelcrantz, arkitekt. (Monografier utgivna av Stockholms kommunalförvaltning, 20). Stockholm: Almqvist & Wiksell/Gebers förlag, 1957. (Dissertation, Stockholm University, 1957)
- Fogelmarck, Stig: Carl Fredrik Adelcrantz. Ett gustavianskt konstnärsöde. (Vitterhetsakademiens skriftserie Svenska lärde). Stockholm: Natur & Kultur, 1994.
