= Kirkman (harpsichord makers) =

The Kirkman family (variants: Kirckman, Kirchmann) were English harpsichord and later piano makers of Alsatian origin, active from the 1750s until the late 1800s.

== Members of the Kirkman family ==
Jacob Kirkman (4 March 1710 – 9 June 1792) was born in Bischwiller, Alsace and moved to England in the early 1730s. He worked for Hermann Tabel, and married his widow in 1738. He became a British subject in 1755. He died in Greenwich and is buried in St Alfege Church in Greenwich.

Abraham Kirkman (1737 – 16 April 1794), also born in Bischwiller, was Jacob Kirkman's nephew. In 1772 they formed a partnership. He died in Hammersmith.

Joseph Kirkman I was the son of Abraham Kirkman, and followed his father in his craft, eventually going into partnership with him.

Joseph Kirkman II (c.1790 – 1877) was the son of Joseph Kirkman I and like him became an instrument maker, helping his father with the last harpsichord they made in 1809 (though the latest surviving today is dated 1800).

== Kirkman harpsichords ==
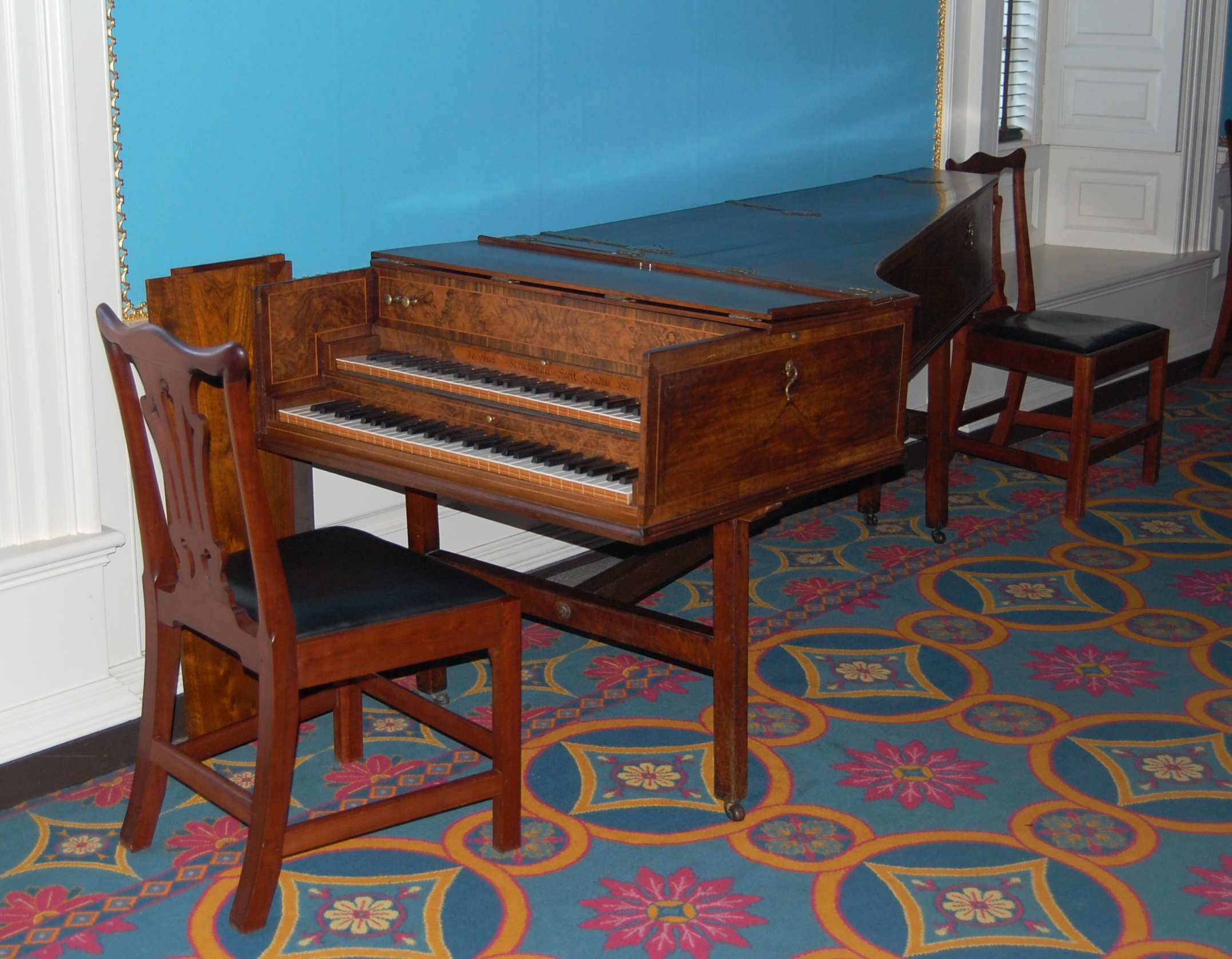
Kirkman harpsichord in Williamsburg

Charles Burney wrote a good deal about Jacob Kirkman, and Fanny Burney described him as 'the first harpsichord maker of the times'; he and Burkat Shudi dominated the production of English harpsichords in the second half of the 18th century, and many of their instruments survive today, though more than twice as many Kirkmans remain, leading Frank Hubbard to describe them as being 'almost mass-produced'.

Like Shudi, Kirkman built three models of harpsichord: single manual instruments with disposition 8' 8' or 8' 8' 4' and double manual instruments with disposition 8' 8' 4' and lute stop. The inner construction of Kirkman harpsichords was based on the Ruckers-type 17th-century Flemish harpsichord, though a distinctive outward appearance had been developed by English makers by the 1720s, featuring veneering inside and outside, detailed inlay and marquetry in the keywell. Key dip was stopped at the by a rail at the far end, which has led to English harpsichords having a reputation for the worst touch of any school of harpsichord building.

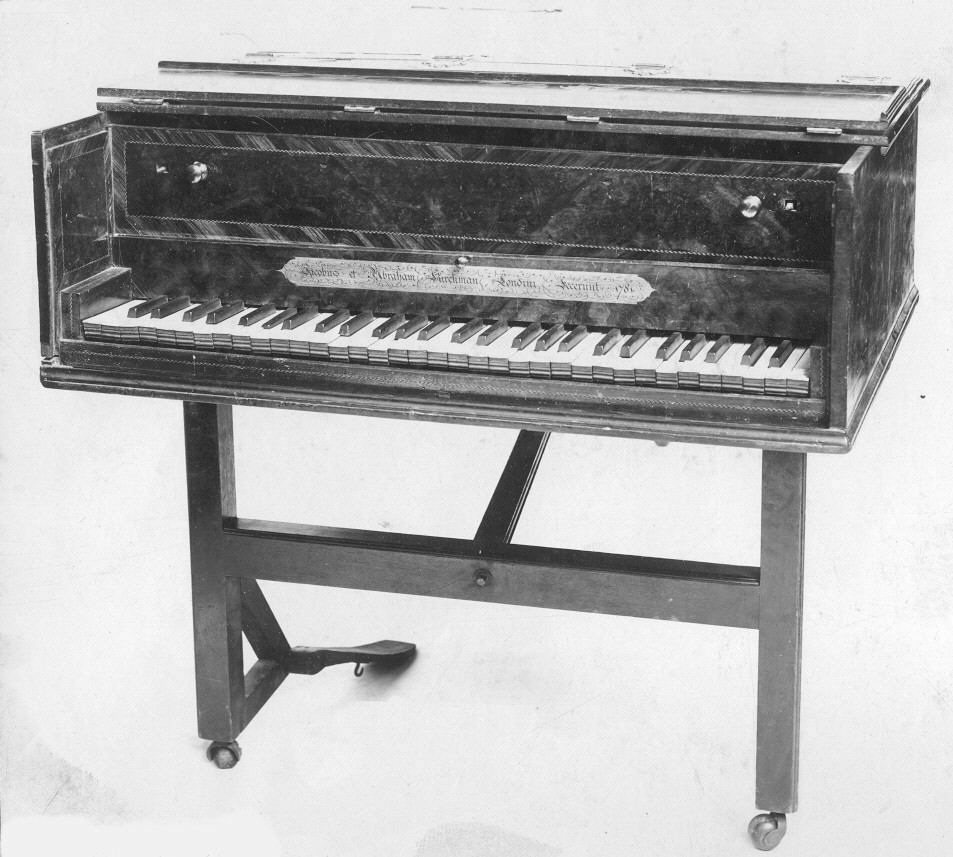
1781 harpsichord constructed by Abraham and Jacob Kirkman

Further innovations were made in later years; the buff stop was introduced c.1760, and was sometimes activated by a pedal on single manual instruments. The machine stop, dating from after 1765, was a mechanism worked by a hand stop and a foot pedal which caused various changes in registration, rather like the arrangements on an organ. The 'nag's head swell' was a segment of the top lid shaped like an elongated horse's head, which opened along the bentside when a foot pedal was pressed; this was later superseded by Schudi's Venetian swell, which worked similarly but was more like a modern organ swell mechanism (and named after its similarity in appearance to a Venetian blind). Extensions in range were also made, as high as c'''', with reversed colour sharps and naturals from g''' upwards; this was perhaps due to musical demands or rivalry with Shudi, who had extended his harpsichords down to CC. Jacob Kirkman made an experimental enharmonic harpsichord for Robert Smith of Trinity College, Cambridge, around 1757.

It was Frank Hubbard's opinion that English harpsichords such as Kirkman and Burkat Shudi's 'are too good. The tone [...] almost interferes with the music', though he didn't think the native repertoire was significant enough to warrant making copies. Others have pointed out that an English harpsichord player of around 1770 might well have had an exceptionally wide musical taste incorporating Scarlatti, Rameau, Handel, C. P. E. Bach, J. C. Bach, Haydn, Mozart, Arne, Purcell, and Sammartini.

The Kirkmans began building fortepianos as they became more popular in the 2nd half of the 18th century; apparently Jacob Kirkman had encountered a piano as early as 1770 but the earliest he is known to have made is a square piano dated 1775. The Kirkman firm continued to make grand and upright pianos throughout the 19th century and were taken over by Collard in 1896.

== Sources ==
- Donald Howard Boalch, Peter Williams, Charles Mould: 'Kirkman [Kirckman, Kirchmann]', Grove Music Online ed. L. Macy (Accessed 2007-05-21), http://www.grovemusic.com/

== See also ==
List of historical harpsichord makers
