= Claviorgan =

Combination of a stringed instrument and an organ

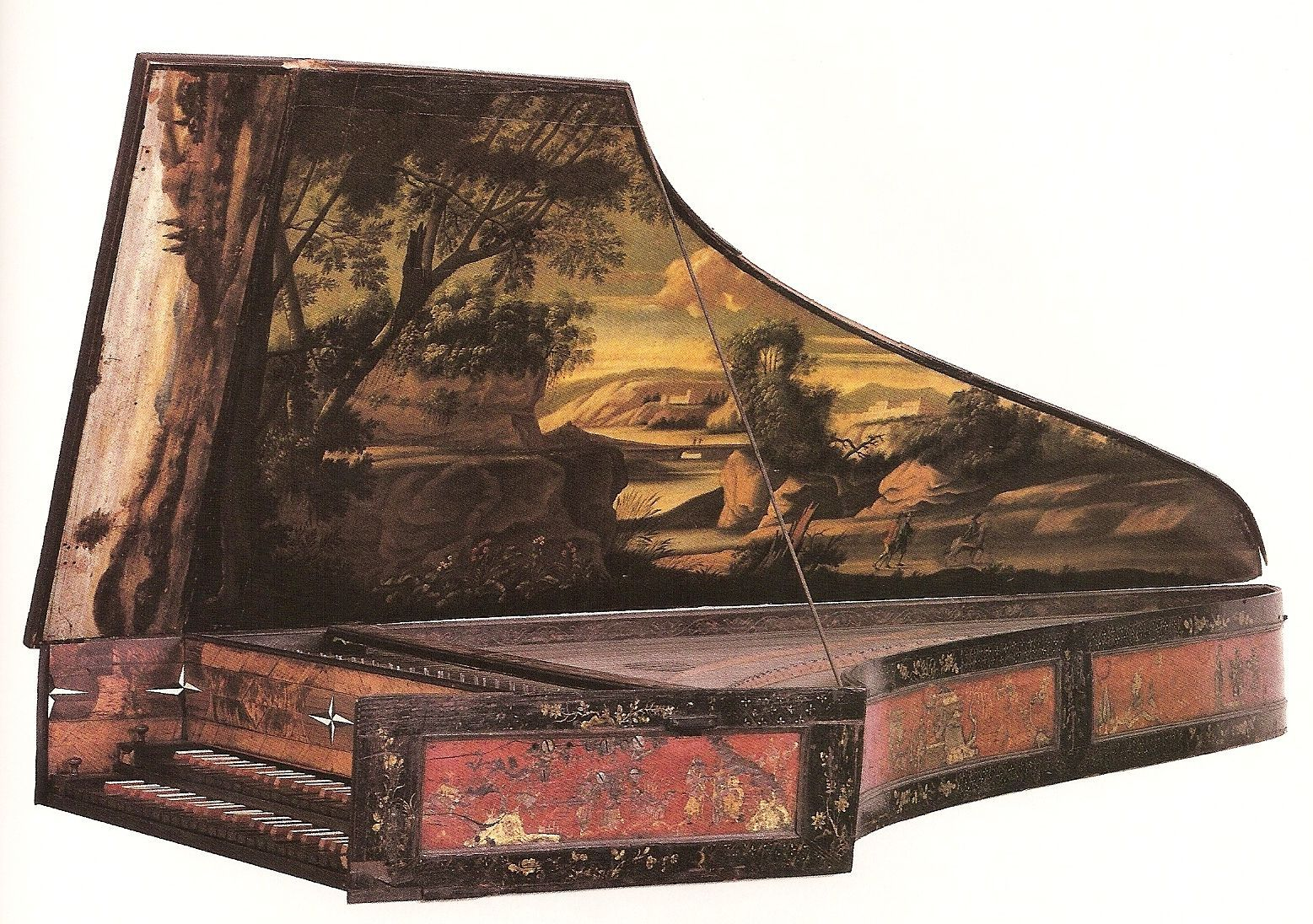
Herman Willenbrock: Claviorganum (Germany 1712)

The claviorgan (also known as the claviorganum, claviorgano, clavecin organisee) is a combination of a stringed instrument (usually a keyboard instrument) and an organ. Its origin is uncertain, but its history can be traced back to the fifteenth century.

According to one account, the instrument was invented by the Moorish instrument maker Mahoma Mofferiz, with his earliest known example documented in 1479. Other "Clabiorganos" or "claui organos" are documented in Spain by the year 1500, and the instrument seems to have spread from there. A number of "virgynalls with regals" are mentioned in the inventories of Henry VIII in 1542/3 and 1547 and Wilson Barry cites references to the claviorganum in England dating back to the 1530s. The term claviorgan in its strictest sense refers to the combination of a harpsichord (or other harpsichord type instrument) and an organ, although later could also be used to refer to a combination of a piano and organ. Michael Praetorius describes the claviorgan in his Syntagma Musicum of 1619 as:

a clavicymbal, or some other symphony, in which a number of pipes is combined with the strings. Externally it looks exactly like a clavicymbal or symphony, apart from the bellows, which are sometimes set at the rear and sometimes placed inside the body

== Description ==
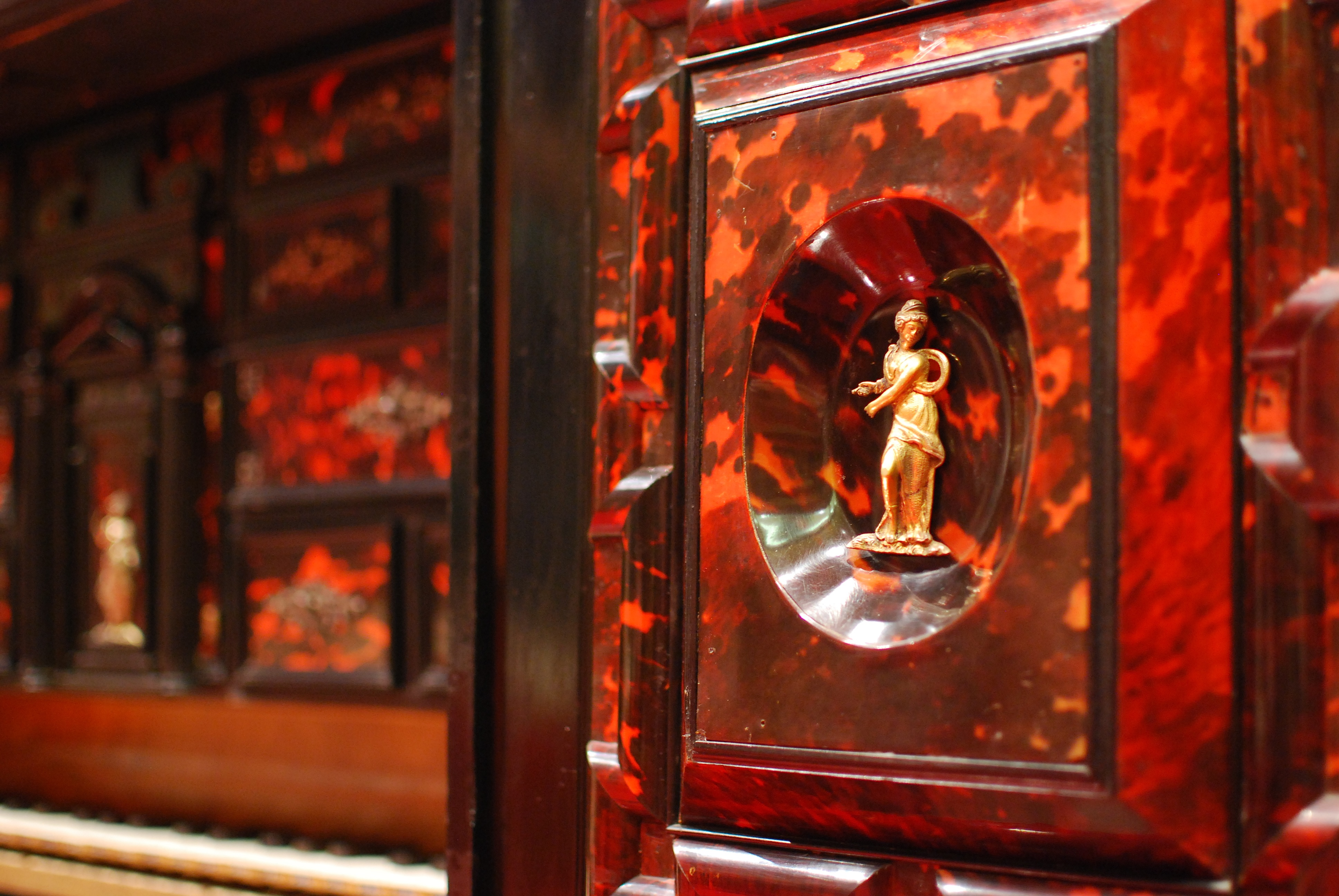
Detail of the Hauslaib Claviorgan, at the Museu de la Música de Barcelona (MDMB 821)

The spinet-regals are usually quite compact, especially compared to their larger harpsichord cousins. The spinet is often of the smaller Italian style in a square case, as opposed to the perhaps more familiar Bentside shape popular in Britain. The organ is usually a small regal, with the bellows perpendicular to the keyboard, and pipes with tiny resonators.

The instrument seems to have been very popular in Britain in the eighteenth century: both the larger harpsichord-organ combinations, and the organised-square pianos. Indeed, there are more than 20 surviving examples built in the UK (mostly in London) of which the large portion date between 1700 and 1800.

The most complete British organised-harpsichord is that constructed for the Earl of Wemyss. The harpsichord is typical of the early and ornate work of Jacob Kirckman, with an organ case that matches the marquetry and elaborate figured veneer of the harpsichord. The harpsichord stop levers are laid out in the conventional fashion on either side of the name-board, with the organ stops being placed at either side of the keyboards with a coupling mechanism to the organ at the front of the harpsichord.

The organ case is also fitted with four foot-levers; three at the front of the organ and one at the side of the case. Two of these are for operating the bellows (one main and one auxiliary), the third shuts off the sliders of the two metal ranks achieving a woody sound, and the final lever operated a kind of swell mechanism opening a sprung panel in the side of the instrument. This allows for quite a lot of variation in timbre between the organ and the harpsichord.

How typical the arrangement is of instruments across Europe and the ages is difficult to quantify, as little is still known about this instrument.

== Early history ==
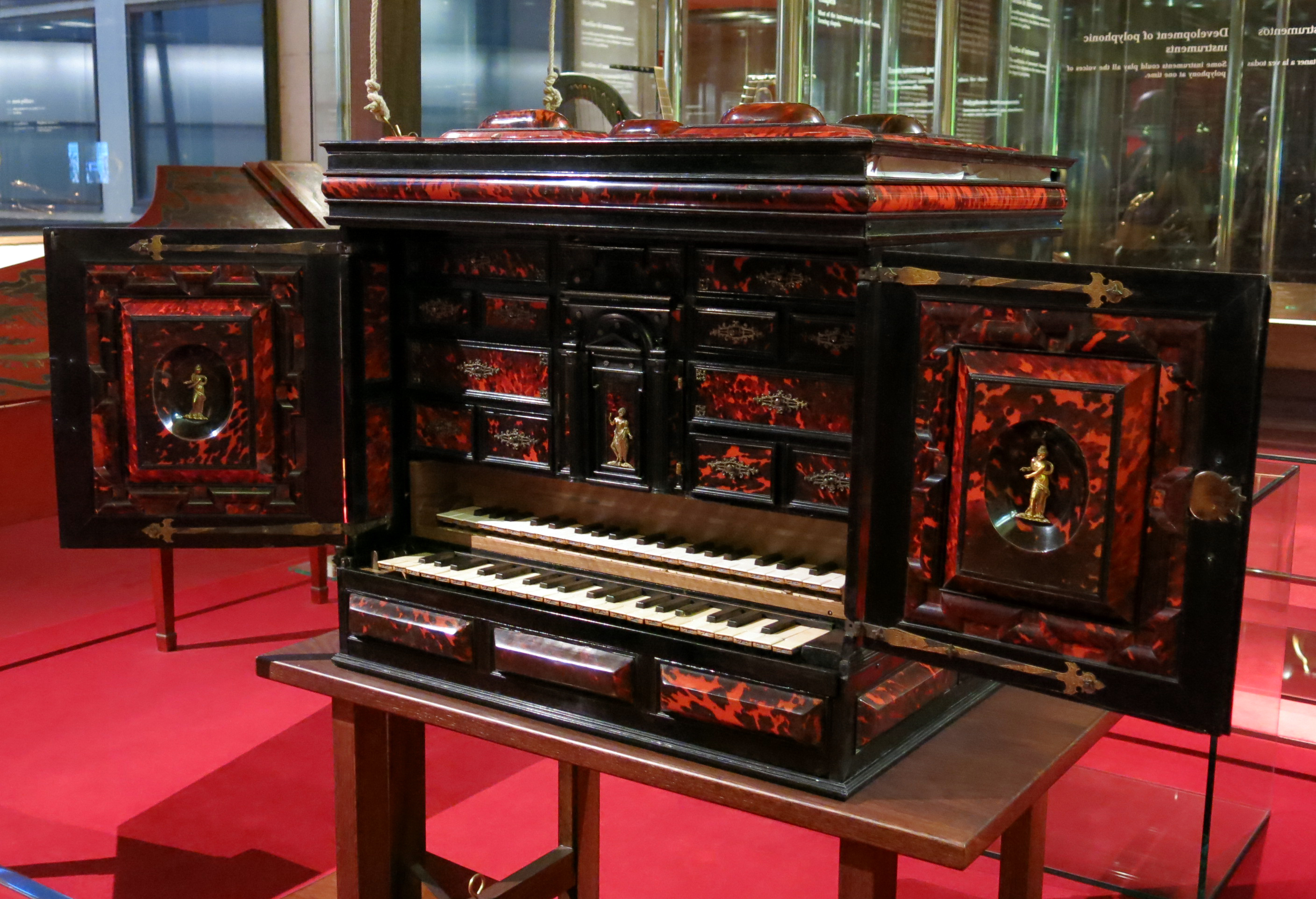
Claviorgan (or claviorganum), Lorenz Hauslaib, MDMB 821 Museu de la Música de Barcelona

Claviorgans were mentioned in the inventories of several early 16th-century members of the Spanish royal family, including inventories from Granada in the year 1500. Other early references to claviorgans are to be found in an inventory of the possessions of Henry VIII taken in 1547 which includes four instruments being combinations of "virgynalles" and "regals". In this early terminology "virgynall" does not refer to a specific instrument but to any plucked string keyboard.

In 1590 Philip III of Spain was given a claviorgan by a German monarch, which also appears in a 1602 inventory of the court instruments. Other royal instruments include a Willenbrock claviorgan made for Prince Georg of Hanover, and a number of instruments which appear to have been made for Frederick Prince of Wales and now in the Royal Collection.

It was primarily used by the aristocracy since the claviorgan was considerably more expensive than any other keyboard instrument barring a full-sized church organ. One English instrument which has been in the possession of the Earl of Wemyss since its purchase in the middle of the eighteenth century still retains the receipts for the organ part alone recording two payments to "John Snetzler, Organ Builder" totalling £86.

== Show instrument ==
There are a couple of known claviorgans that were ‘show’ instruments. One surviving example is an automatic claviorgan by Matteus Rungell which is now in a museum in Dresden combining an organ and a spinet.

However, a more famous example is the ‘Galleria armonico’ assembled by Michelle Todini in Rome in the seventeenth century, and which ended its days in the palace of the Verospi marquises, now the Palazzo del Credito Italiano. This consisted of two rooms, one of which contained seven keyboard instruments all of which were said to be controlled from the keyboard of a harpsichord. This included an organ, three types of spinets, a violin, and another bowed string instrument. There are also several illustrations of the instrument, although it is not known how accurate any of them are. The harpsichord and its accompanying statues may now be found in the collection of the Metropolitan Museum of Art in New York as well as a clay model surviving from its inception. No part of the composite instrument is known to survive.

Another example of a claviorgan playing stringed instruments is described in a letter from Henry Oldenburg in 1664.

== See also ==
- Hupfeld Phonoliszt-Violina Model B

== Sources ==
- New Grove Dictionary of Music, online edition [available (with subscription) at <http://www.grovemusic.com >]
- Wilson Barry (1990) ‘The Lodewyk Theewes Claviorganum and its Position in the History of Keyboard Instruments’, Journal of the American Musical Instrument Society, xvi (1990), pp. 5–41.
- Escalas Llimona, Romà (2002). "Claviorgans Attributed to Laurentius Hauslaib in New York, Moscow and Barcelona". Music in Art: International Journal for Music Iconography. 27 (1–2): 87–100. ISSN 1522-7464.
