= Burkat Shudi =

English-Swiss harpsichord maker (1702–1773)

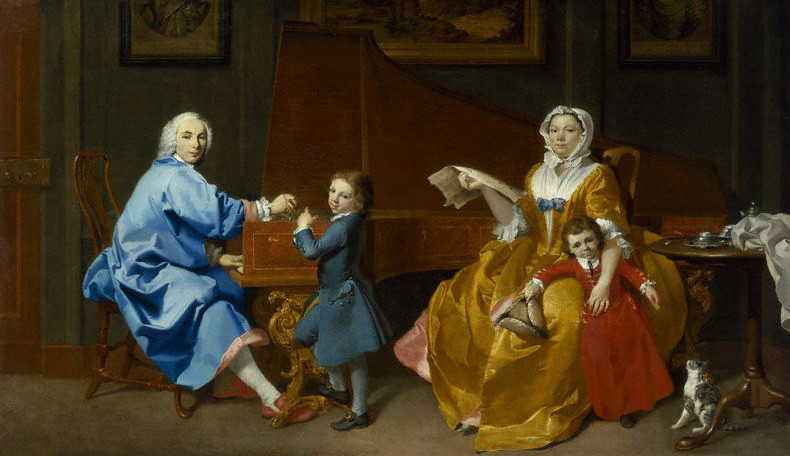
Shudi family portrait in 1742 by Carl Marcus Tuscher. Burkhardt, Katharina, and two sons Joshua and Burkat. National Portrait Gallery

Burkat Shudi (variants: Burkhart, Burkhardt, Schudi, Tschudi, Tshudi; 13 March 1702 – 19 August 1773) was an English harpsichord maker of Swiss origin.

== Biography ==
He was born in Schwanden in the Canton of Glarus, and arrived in England in 1718, where he started work as a joiner. He married Catherine Wild, whose parents came from the same town as him, in 1728. John Broadwood worked for him from 1761, and in 1769 became his partner after marrying his daughter Barbara. Johannes Zumpe also worked for him.

He retired in 1771, being succeeded by his son, who was also called Burkat (c. 1738–1803), following whose death the firm was taken over entirely by Broadwood, who had by then become a piano maker. There are twenty-three harpsichords by Shudi and 27 by Shudi and Broadwood in existence today. Three harpsichords exist by his nephew Joshua, who worked for him unsatisfactorily for a while, and one signed 'Bernard Shudi', about whom nothing is known.

== Shudi's harpsichords ==
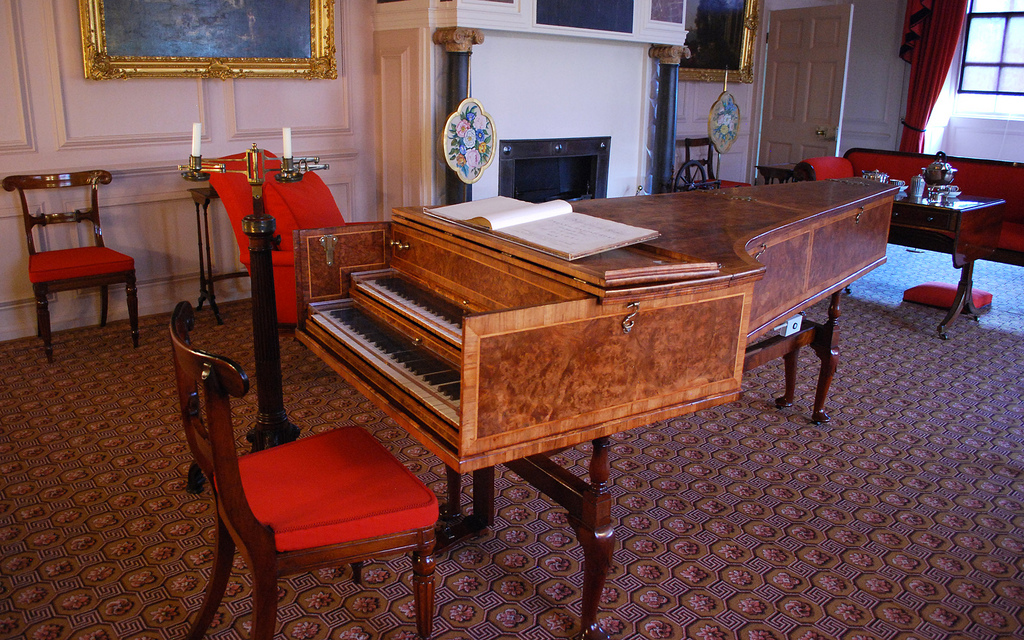
The harpsichord Shudi built for King George III

His harpsichords drew on the Flemish tradition, dominated by Ruckers, whose harpsichords had become extremely prized in the 18th century; he himself owned and hired out two Ruckers harpsichords. The usual specifications for his single-manual harpsichords was 8' 8' or 8' 8' 4' and for his double-manual harpsichords 8' 8' 4' and lute stop. Most from c. 1760 also had a buff stop, occasionally operated by a pedal.

He made a great many innovations in the harpsichord: from c. 1765 he introduced the machine stop, a mechanism engaged by a handstop and operated by a foot pedal which gradually reduces the registration on each manual; from c. 1765 he extended the range down to CC; from c. 1769 he introduced the Venetian swell: a contraption nearly identical in mechanism and purpose to the expression pedal found on the organ, operated with a foot pedal and placed above the strings. He used leather plectra in some registers; it is not known whether he ever built an instrument with a 16' stop, though none survives with one. He also made claviorgans (a joint harpsichord and organ) though none of those instruments remain.

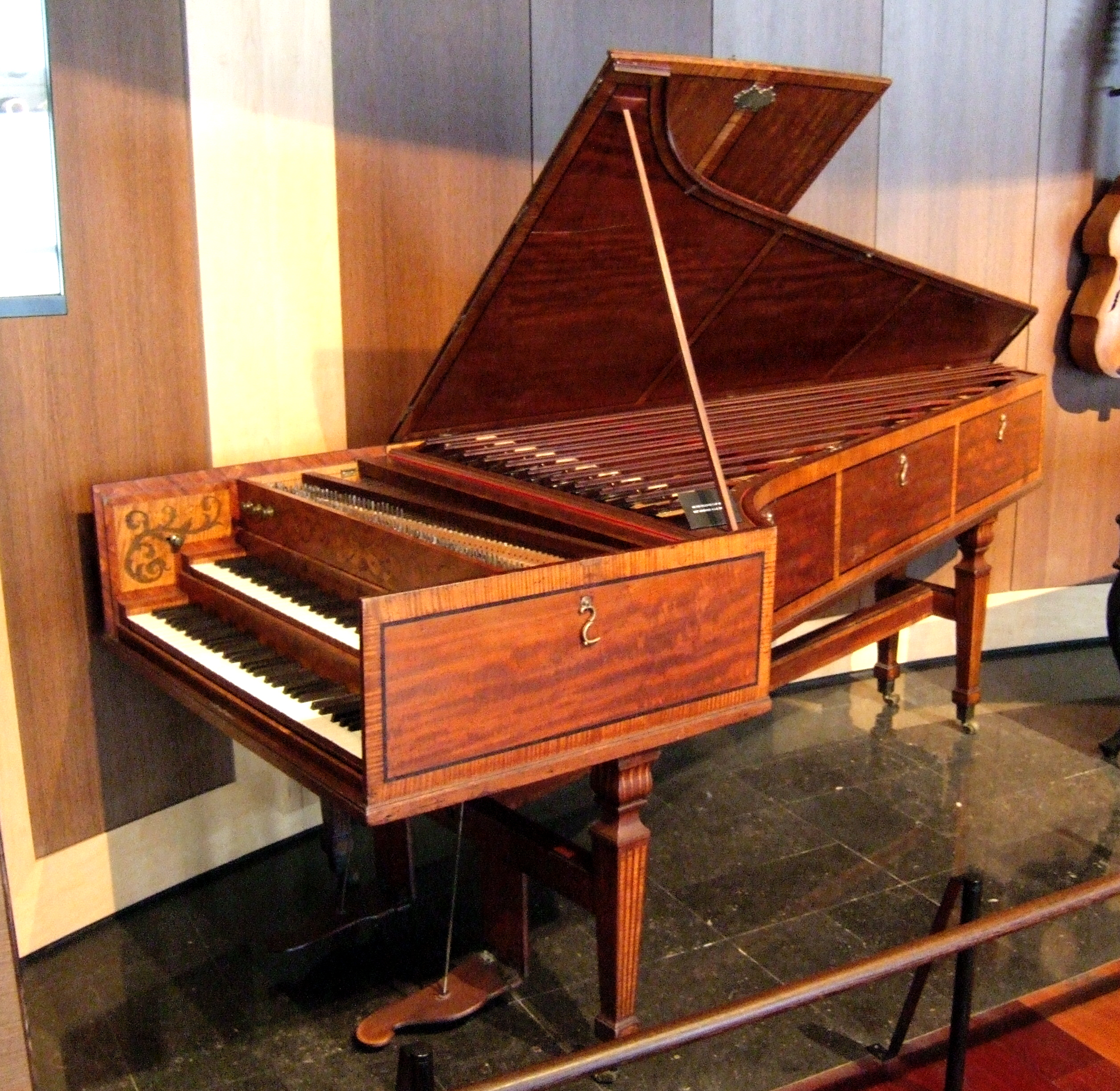
A 1773 Shudi harpsichord equipped with Venetian swell; now in the Museum of Musical Instruments in Brussels

Charles Burney preferred the tone of Shudi's harpsichords to Kirkman's and his instruments were highly valued; his customers included Frederick the Great, Empress Maria Theresa, Joseph Haydn, Muzio Clementi, the Prince of Wales, Thomas Gainsborough, and George Frideric Handel. Wolfgang Amadeus Mozart tried one of his harpsichords in 1765. His instruments were exported as far as Russia, Porto and Naples (where one of his harpsichords was, according to Burney, regarded as a 'musical phenomenon').

It was Frank Hubbard's opinion that the harpsichords of Shudi and Kirkman represent 'the culmination of the harpsichord maker's art [...] for sheer magnificence of tone, reedy trebles and sonorous basses, no other harpsichords ever matched them', though he was later put off building copies because so little significant music was written for them.

== See also ==
- List of historical harpsichord makers
- A Shudi harpsichord is sent aboard the generation starship Newhome in the 1992 Joe Haldeman science fiction novel Worlds Enough and Time.
