= John Broadwood =

Scottish piano manufacturer (1732–1812)

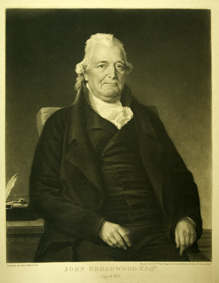

John Broadwood (6 October 1732 – 17 July 1812) was the Scottish founder of the piano manufacturer Broadwood and Sons.

== Life ==
Broadwood was born 6 October 1732 and christened 15 Oct 1732 at St Helens, Cockburnspath in Berwickshire, and grew up in Oldhamstocks, East Lothian. He inherited his father James Broadwood's (b1697 Oldhamstocks) profession, that of a wright or carpenter/joiner, and as a young man walked from Oldhamstocks to London, a distance of almost 400 miles (640 km), where he worked for the harpsichord maker Burkat Shudi. Burkat Shudi died in 1773, and John Broadwood took control of the company from his brother-in-law in 1783.

Broadwood is credited, together with Robert Stodart, founder of another famous firm of piano makers, with helping Americus Backers to perfect the English Grand Action, which remained in use by many makers virtually unchanged for 70 years and, in Broadwoods' case over 100 years, and continued in use in various improved forms until the early years of the 20th century. In time his sales of pianos exceeded those of harpsichords, to the point that he ceased to manufacture harpsichords in 1793. He died in London. Broadwood's other technical innovations in piano manufacture include: adding a separate bridge for the bass notes, patenting the piano pedal in 1783 and expanding the then-standard five octave range upwards by half an octave, in response to a request of Dussek, and then by half an octave downwards.

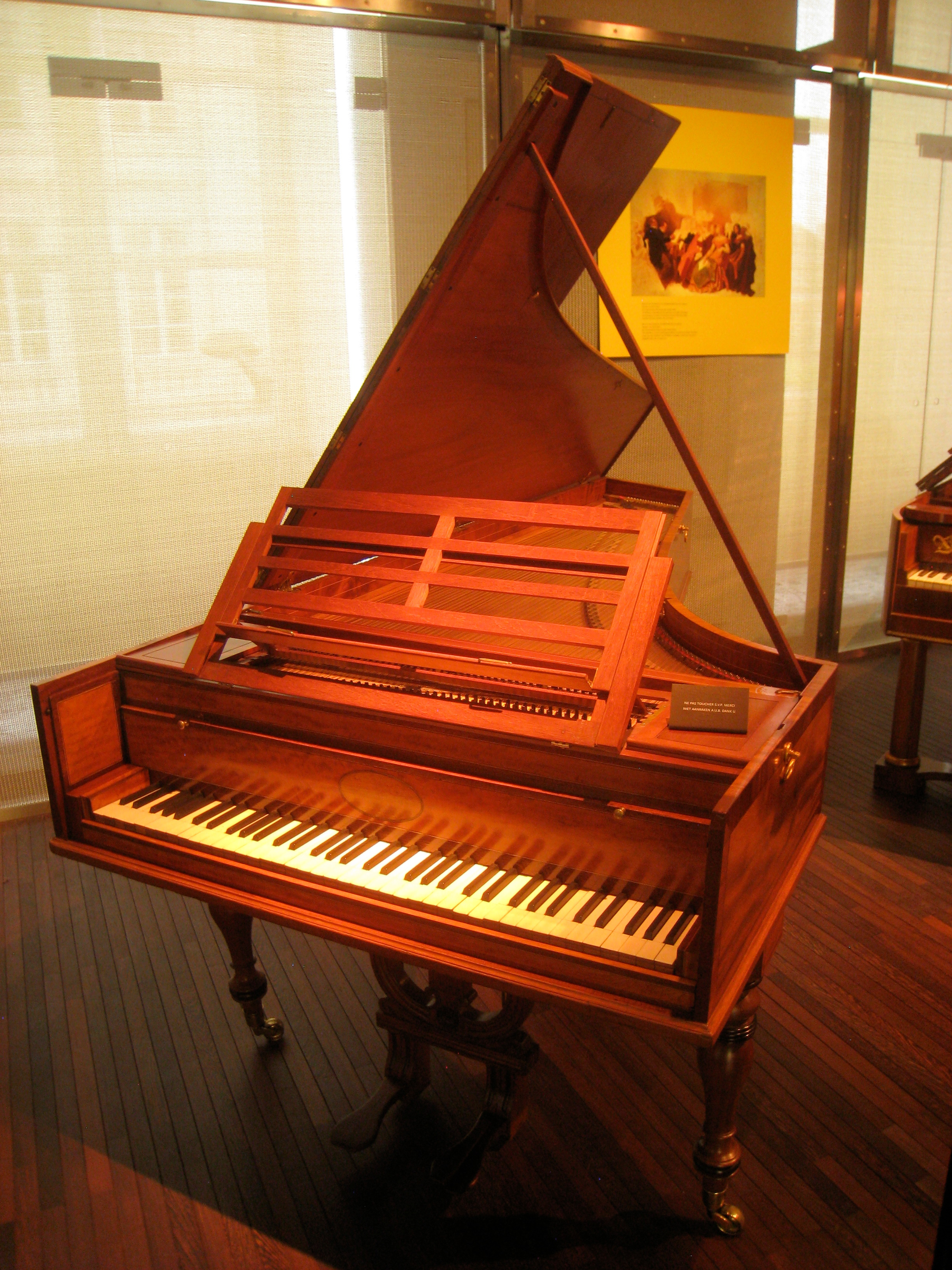
An 1810 Broadwood grand, now in the Musical Instrument Museum in Brussels

As a company, Broadwood and Sons prospered, and was passed into the hands of his sons, James Shudi Broadwood and Thomas Broadwood.

== Family ==
John married Shudi's daughter Barbara Broadwood in 1769. They had four children, then Barbara died. He then married Mary Kitson in 1781 and had a further six children. Many of his descendants were involved in pianoforte manufacturing in England and some were involved in the British Army in India during the reign of Queen Victoria. Others emigrated to Australia, where Broadwood descendants still live. The Broadwood family tree can be traced back to circa 1580.

The British general Robert Broadwood (1862–1917) was a grandson by his son Thomas (son by John's second wife Mary Kitson) and Mary Athlea Matthews.
