= Pedal piano =

Type of piano that includes an organ-style pedalboard

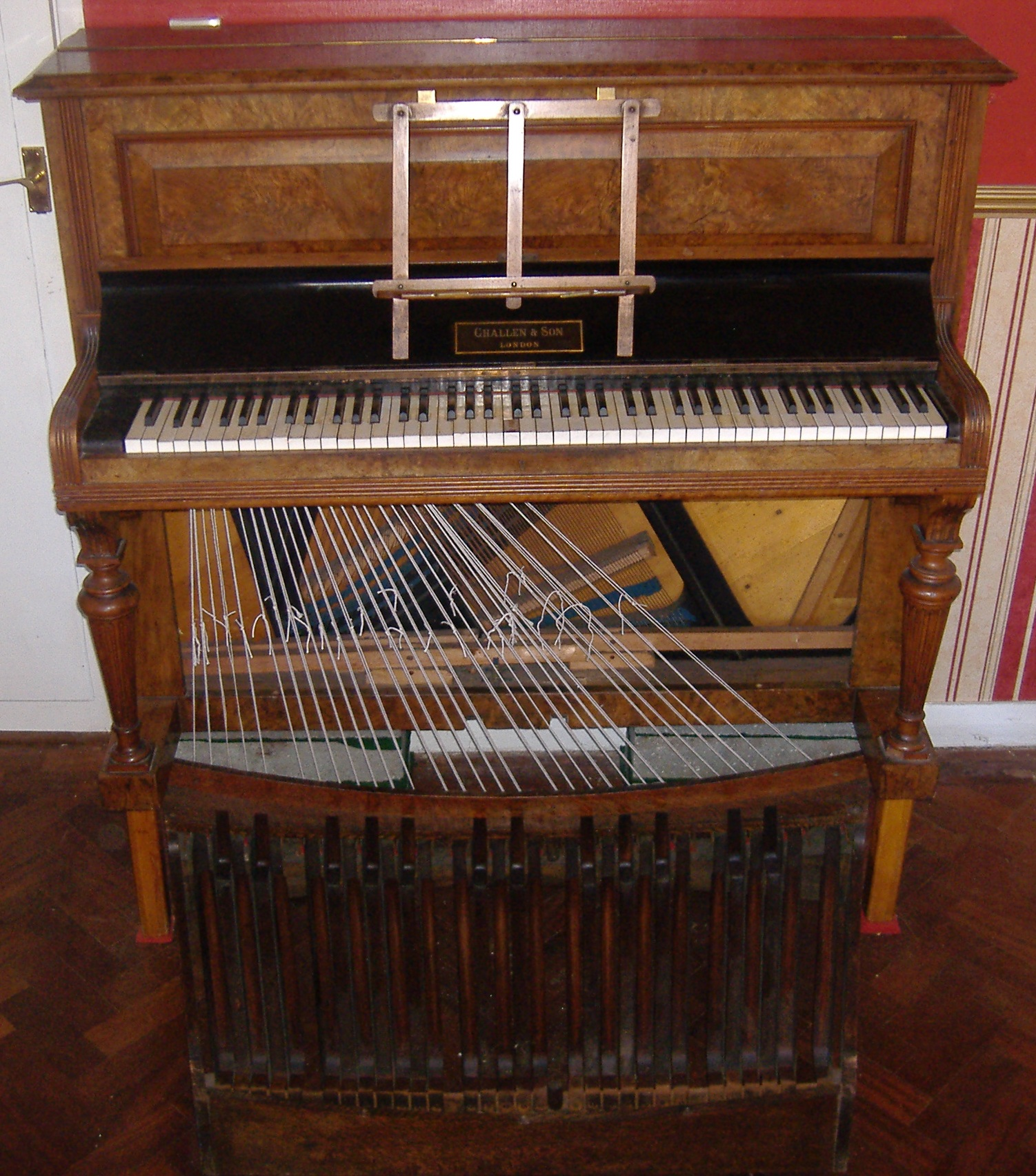
An upright pedal piano

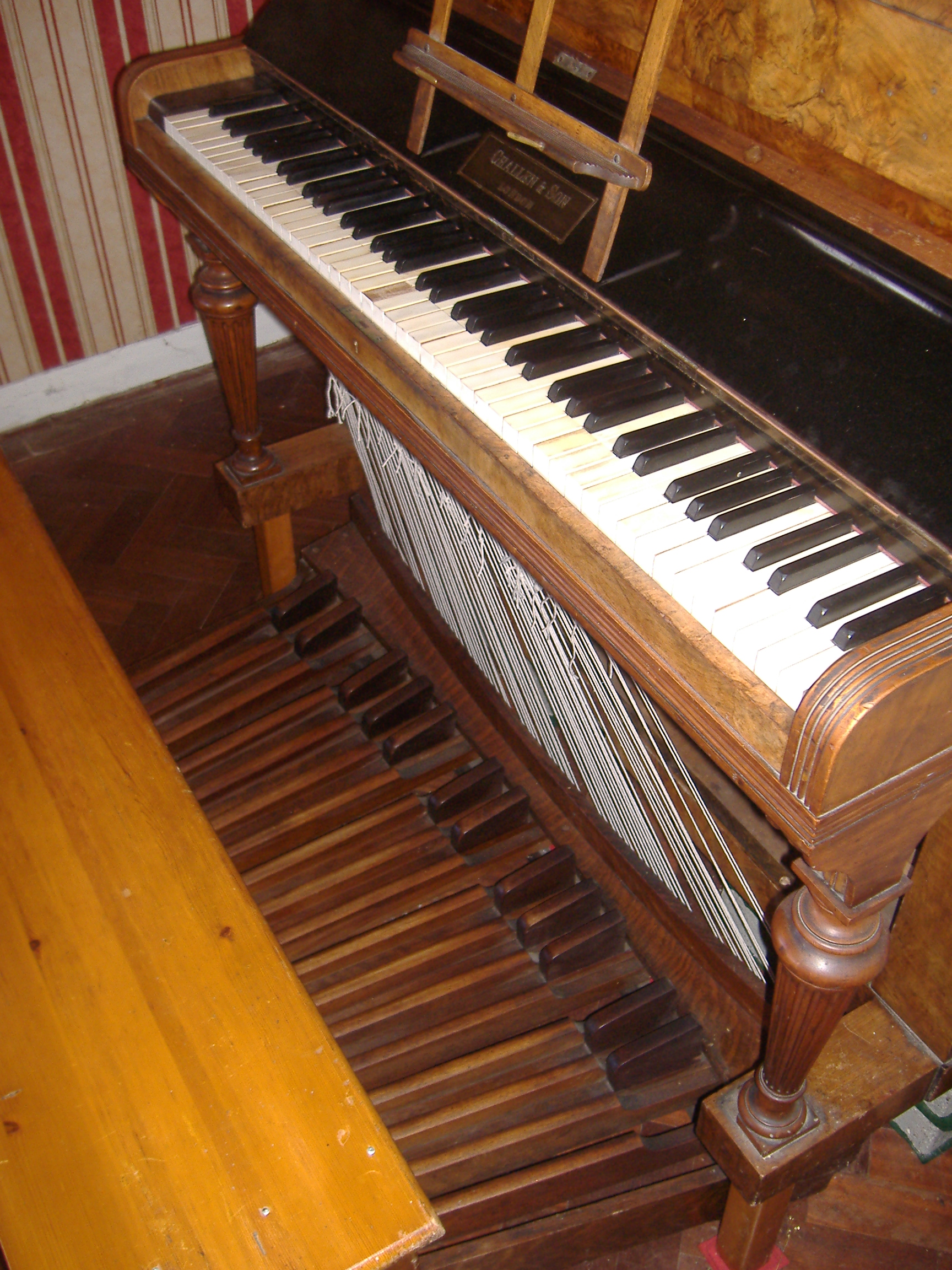
Another view

The pedal piano (also known as the piano-pédalier or simply pédalier (Note: may be used in English as a short of form of piano-pédalier; in French however pédalier can only mean pedalboard)) is a kind of piano that includes a pedalboard, enabling bass register notes to be played with the feet, as is standard on the organ.

There are two broad types of pedal pianos: either the pedal board may be an integral part of the instrument, using the same strings and mechanism as the manual keyboard (e.g. the 19th century Érard pedal grand piano and Pleyel upright pedal piano), or it may consist of two independent pianos (each with its separate mechanics and strings) which are placed one above the other, (Note: this was the system used for pedal clavichords and pedal harpsichords) either a regular piano played by the hands and a bass-register piano played by the feet (e.g. the 18th century pedal piano owned by Wolfgang Amadeus Mozart and the 21st century Doppio Borgato made by Luigi Borgato), or two standard pianos of which the lower one is played from a pedalboard which acts on its (manual) keyboard through a special mechanism (e.g. the 21st century Pinchi Pedalpiano System).

== History ==
The origins of the pedal piano are found in the pedal clavichord and pedal harpsichord, of which an original of the former survives while only descriptions and modern reproductions of the latter remain. The first citation of a clavichord with pedalboard appeared around 1460 in a section dedicated to musical instruments in an encyclopedic treatise written by the scholar Paulus Paulirinus (1413–1471). Organists would use these instruments for practice when no-one was available to work the bellows for a church organ or, in the wintertime, to avoid having to practice in an unheated church. Johann Sebastian Bach owned a pedal harpsichord, and his organ trio sonatas BWV 525–530, Passacaglia and Fugue in C minor BWV 582, and other works can be played on the instrument.

Wolfgang Amadeus Mozart owned a fortepiano with independent pedals, built for him in 1785 by Anton Walter. His father refers to this in a letter to his daughter on March 12, 1785. The autograph manuscript of the Concerto in D minor K. 466, composed the same year, shows a series of chords for the left hand plus bass notes an octave lower, covering about 2 1/2 measures. Some believe that the bass notes were intended for the pedal, but there is disagreement about this interpretation. The low bass notes could be an earlier version of the left hand part which Mozart neglected to cross out when he decided to replace them with chords.

Louis Schone made a pedalflügel for Robert Schumann in 1843, when he was in Dresden. Schumann preferred an upright pedal piano, and his pedal keyboard had 29 notes and was connected with an action placed at the back of the piano where a special soundboard, covered with 29 strings, was built into the case. Schumann wrote much music for the pedal piano and was so enthusiastic about the instrument that he convinced Felix Mendelssohn, who owned a grand pedal piano, to form a class devoted to it in the Leipzig Conservatory. Charles-Valentin Alkan owned an Erard pedal piano made in 1853 and now in the Musée de la Musique, the historic instrument collection of the Conservatoire de Paris. Alkan composed a number of works for it, in the virtuoso style to be found in his other piano music. Kevin Bowyer has revived some of this music in recent years, though he plays it on the organ.

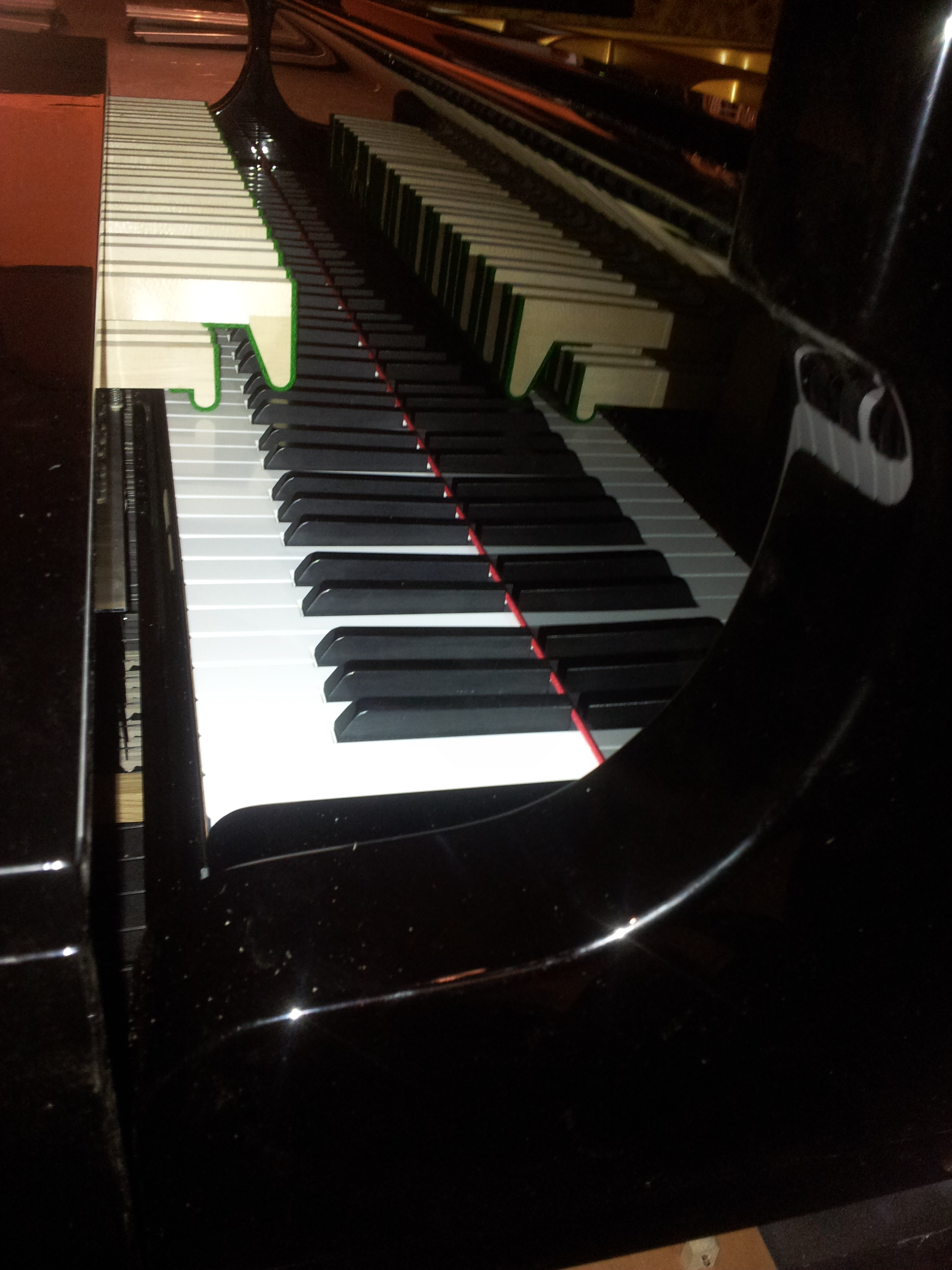
Pinchi Pedalpiano System – detail

The instrument never became very popular in the 1900s, and it remains a rarity. It is mostly used to enable organists to practice at home, rather like the pedal harpsichord and clavichord were centuries ago, instead of being used to play the pedal piano repertoire. In the 2000s, pedal pianos are made in Italy by Luigi Borgato (who reinvented and patented it). This company makes the Doppio Borgato, an independent bass-register instrument connected to a pedal board, on which a concert grand can be placed. Borgato expanded the register of the bass piano to 37 notes, A_{0} to A_{3} (rather than the standard 30 or 32 on an organ).

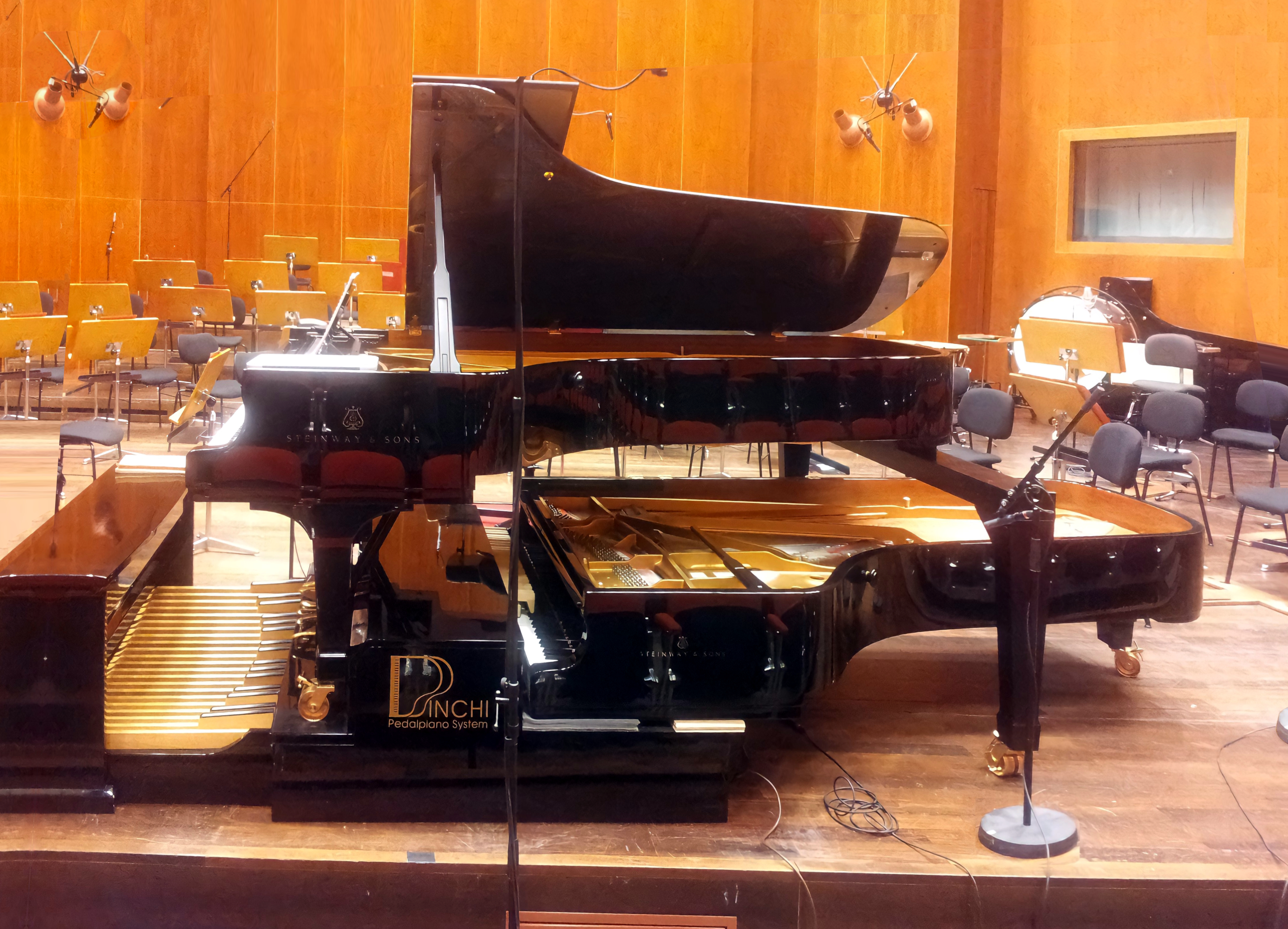
Pinchi Pedalpiano System with two Steinway D pianos

On September 13, 2011 Italian pianist Roberto Prosseda presented the modern premiere of the Concerto for pedal piano and orchestra by Charles Gounod with Orchestra Toscanini di Parma conducted by Jan Latham Koenig.

On April 27, 2012, the Pinchi Pedalpiano System, designed by Claudio Pinchi and Roberto Prosseda, and built by the organ building enterprise Fratelli Pinchi Ars Organi, (Note: The Fratelli Pinchi are siblings Andrea, Claudio and Barbara Pinchi. As of June 2013 the website of Fratelli Pinchi Ars Organi does not provide any information regarding the Pinchi Pedalpiano System.) was presented in a public performance by Roberto Prosseda. It is a pedalboard which works with any two standard 88-key grand pianos. (Note: The Pinchi system does not fit pianos with extended keyboards, like the Bösendorfer or the Stuart & Sons, which have keys going down to F_{0} or C_{0}.) The Pinchi pedalboard has 37 pedals (from A to A three octaves up), but has a total range of five octaves, thanks to its 61 wooden "fingers", some of which can be seen in the adjacent picture, (Note: Actually in the picture only the row of 25 chromatic "fingers" which play the 25 black keys of the 5 octaves can be fully seen. Of the row of 36 diatonic "fingers" which play the 36 white keys of those 5 octaves and which is positioned underneath the row of chromatic "fingers" only the highest three "fingers" can be seen.) and which operate the lower 61 keys (A_{0} to A_{5}) of the lower piano. These "fingers" are mapped to the 37 note pedalboard in three independent stops of three octaves each (Note: That is, one can play any combination of those stops. Besides the individual stops 16′, 8′, and 4′, one can double in octaves with 16′ + 8′ and 8′ + 4′, double in fifteenths (double octaves) with 16′ + 4′, and treble in octaves with 16′ + 8′ + 4′) (A_{0}–A_{3} for 16′, A_{1}–A_{4} for 8′, and A_{2}–A_{5} for 4′).

== Performers ==
In recent years, performance of works for the pedal piano on that instrument, as opposed to on organ, has increased. Recent performers on the pedal piano include the American organist and pianist Dana Robinson, Jean Dubé, Olivier Latry, the American organist Peter Sykes, the German organist Martin Schmeding, the Slovenian organist and harpsichordist Dalibor Miklavčič, the American pianist John Khouri, Jean Guillou, Cameron Carpenter, and Roberto Prosseda.

== Compositions for pedal piano ==
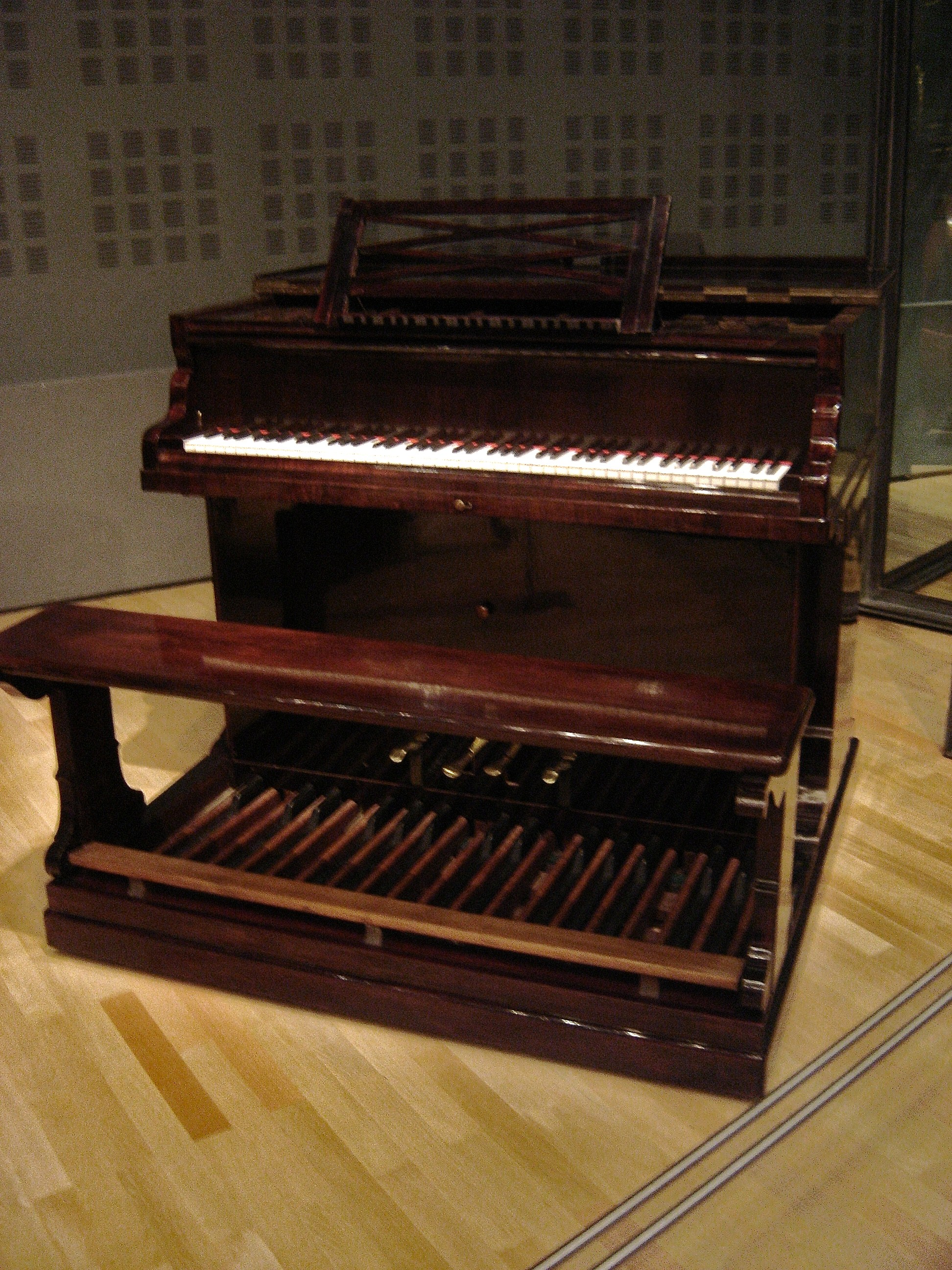
An 1853 Érard upright piano pedalier, in the Musée de la musique, Paris

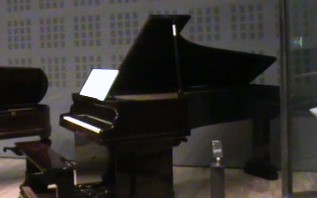
The Érard grand piano pedalier of Charles-Valentin Alkan, now in the Musée de la musique

(In addition to the following list of music that is specifically for pedal piano, music written for organ can often be played on the pedal piano by reading directly from the organ score.)

=== 19th century ===
- Alexandre Pierre François Boëly (1785–1858)
  - 12 Pieces, Op. 18
- Ernst Richter (1808–1879)
  - 3 Preludes and Fugues, Op. 21
- Robert Schumann (1810-1856)
  - Studien, Op. 56
  - Skizzen, Op. 58
  - 6 Fugues on B-A-C-H, Op. 60
- Franz Liszt (1811–1886)
  - Fantasie und Fuge über den Choral "Ad nos, ad salutarem undam" from Meyerbeer's "Prophet"
- Charles Valentin Alkan (1813–1888)
  - 12 Études pour les pieds seulement
  - Benedictus in D minor, Op. 54
  - 13 Prières, Op. 64
  - 11 Grands Préludes et une transcription du "Messiah" de Händel, Op. 66
  - Impromptu sur le choral de Luther "Ein feste Burg ist unser Gott", Op. 69
  - Bombardo-Carillon for pedal-piano, four feet (or piano four hands)
- Charles Gounod (1818–1893)
  - Fantasie sur l'hymne national russe for pedal-piano and orchestra
  - Suite Concertante for pedal-piano and orchestra
  - Danse Roumaine for pedal-piano and orchestra
  - Concerto in E flat major for pedal-piano and orchestra
  - Marcia Solenne for pedal-piano
  - Larghetto for violin, viola, cello and piano with pedalboard
- Johann Georg Herzog (1822–1909)
  - 6 Fugues, Op. 37
  - Passacaglia
- Théodore Salomé (1834–1896)
  - 10 Pièces pour orgue ou piano-pédalier, Volume 1
  - 10 Pièces pour orgue ou piano-pédalier, Volume 2
  - 12 Pièces nouvelles pour orgue ou piano-pédalier, Op. 59
- Camille Saint-Saëns (1835–1921)
  - Concerto for pedal piano and orchestra (First version of the 2nd Piano Concerto)
- Théodore Dubois (1837–1924)
  - 12 Pièces pour orgue ou piano-pédalier
  - 12 Pièces nouvelles pour orgue ou piano-pédalier
- Filippo Capocci (1840–1911)
  - 10 Pièces pour orgue ou piano-pédalier
- Samuel-Alexandre Rousseau (1853–1904)
  - 15 Pièces pour orgue ou piano-pédalier
- Léon Boëllmann (1862–1897)
  - 12 Pieces, Op. 16

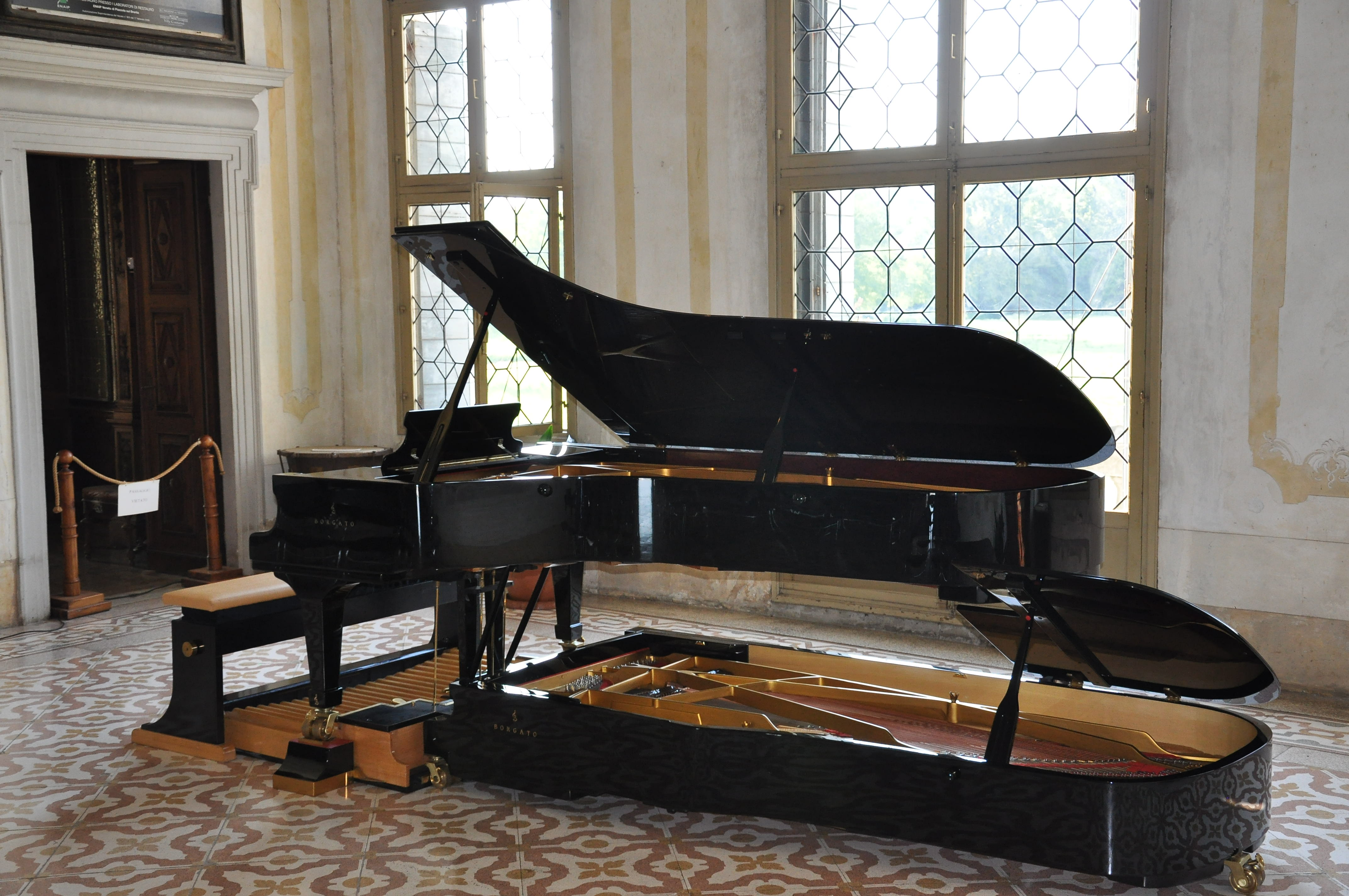
Doppio Borgato

=== 21st century ===
- Cameron Carpenter
  - "Cameron Carpenter"
- Franco Oppo (1935-2016)
  - "Freu dich sehr o meine Seele" (2000)
- Jean Guillou (1930-2019)
  - "Epitases" (2002)
- Charlemagne Palestine
  - Compositions for pedal piano (2005)
- Ennio Morricone
  - Studio IV bis (2011)
- Andrea Morricone
  - Omaggio a J.S.B. (2011)
- Cristian Carrara
  - Magnificat for pedal piano and orchestra (2011)
- Nimrod Borenstein
  - Fireworks, for pedal piano (2011)
- Michael Glenn Williams
  - Tip-Tap (2011)
- Francesco Trocchia
  - Trio Op. 15 n. 1 for pedal piano, cello and French horn (2013)
  - Diapositive di una metamorfosi for pedal piano, violin and cello (2014)
- Michael Bakrnčev
  - Fünf Charakterstücke für Pedalflügel (Five Character Pieces for Pedal Piano) (2016) Dedicated to Italian pianist Roberto Prosseda.
- Johannes Skudlik
  - "Johannes Skudlik transcriptions"

== See also ==
- Category: Pedal piano players
- Category: Composers for pedal piano
