= Innovations in the piano =

Piano construction is by now a rather conservative area; most of the technological advances were made by about 1900, and indeed it is possible that some contemporary piano buyers might actually be suspicious of pianos that are made differently from the older kind. Yet piano manufacturers, especially the smaller ones, are still experimenting with ways to build better pianos.

In the early 21st century, the obvious way to raise the technological level of any mechanical device is to use digital technology to control it (compare the mid 19th century, where the obvious route was to make some of its parts from steel; e.g. piano strings). Of course, digital technology has been incorporated into pianos, and this innovation is discussed below. But in a sense, it is a far greater challenge to improve the piano in its own terms, as a mechanical/acoustic device. This challenge pits the modern piano designer against some of the finest engineering minds of the nineteenth century, an era when pianos represented some of the most sophisticated of all technological achievements. Nineteenth-century piano innovation was, moreover, financed by a far more robust piano market than exists today.

A few of the "innovations" discussed below were actually present in at least some pianos in the distant past. They are innovations to the extent that the old idea had become unfamiliar to most of the piano community through long disuse.

For clarification of the various parts of the piano mentioned below, see the Wikipedia article piano.

== Acoustic and mechanical innovations ==
=== Actions ===
The Fandrich & Sons piano company of Stanwood, Washington was set up to produce pianos with the "Fandrich vertical action", a new kind of piano action developed by Darrell Fandrich and Chris Trivelas. It is intended to provide the same sensitivity of touch to upright pianos that is available in grands. Currently, Fandrich and Sons installs the Fandrich action in pianos made by the Bohemia firm, in the Czech Republic.

The Fazioli piano company of Sacile, Italy, is now selling pianos with two (or more) actions. The idea is that different actions can be regulated and voiced according to the requirements of particular players or musical styles. Since piano actions are built as a single unit, they can be removed or inserted with just a few minutes' work.

The Magnetic Balanced Action system, invented by Evert Snel and Hans Velo in the Netherlands, permits variable touch according to the player's preference. The idea of the system is to use the force of magnets, whose position is adjustable, to regulate the touch-weight of the keys, rather than fixed weights. This system is now a factory option on Fazioli and Petrof pianos, and can be custom installed on other pianos.

The Kawai Piano company of Japan has in recent years created an action out of an ABS styran/carbon composite. There are no independent reviews of this method.

The Wessel, Nickel and Gross company makes custom actions for grand pianos (and uprights) that are also epoxy carbon fiber. Unlike Kawai, WNG uses composite material for the hammer shank also.

=== Bridge agraffes ===
The Stuart and Sons piano company of Newcastle, New South Wales, Australia, makes a piano in which there are bridge agraffes. Agraffes are a kind of sturdy metal clip that hold the strings in place. They were invented in 1808 by the piano pioneer Sébastien Érard and have long been employed in quality pianos to terminate the front (i.e., closer to the player) end of the string. The Stuart and Sons Agraffe device is used to couple the strings to the bridge and soundboard structure. The agraffe defines the string's speaking length (frequency), containing the reaction forces produced by bending the strings as they pass through it. This mechanism negates the need for string down bearing that is required in the traditional pinned bridge system. This method, scientifically proven, ensures a more efficient transmission of sound from the strings to the soundboard, able to make the strings vibrate in a more controlled way, improving the dynamics and ensuring a more successful support.

The American company Sohmer, along with Blüthner in Europe, among others, applied this idea to the string termination on the bridge in pianos beginning in the 1890s, where bridge pins are ordinarily used. Most applications of agraffes have been located at the near end of the strings, close to the tuning pins. Stuart has reintroduced the use of agraffes on the bridges (of which their pianos have two).

It is claimed that bridge agraffes permit efficient transmission of sound from the strings to the soundboard, resulting in a very well-sustained tone. Similar results are noted with the brass agraffe used by Sohmer into the 1930s.

Since the strings do not need to bear down heavily on the bridges (a force of 600 to 1200 pounds = 2.7 to 5.4 kN in conventional pianos), bridge agraffes may also help preserve the crucial upward curve, or "crown," in the soundboard.

The Phoenix Piano of the UK also uses a specially designed bridge agraffe to greatly reduce the force exerted on the soundboard, and allowing it to be made of carbon fiber composite instead of wood.

=== Carbon fiber soundboards ===
The soundboard needs to meet two conflicting requirements. First of all, there must be sufficient transmission of vibratory energy from the string to the soundboard that our ears are ultimately provided with a sound of satisfactory loudness. If the soundboard were a plate of steel 4 cm thick instead of a wooden board about 1 cm thick, its wave impedance would be increased several hundredfold and we would hear almost nothing from the soundboard, nor would the string produce much sound directly in the air. If on the other hand the disturbance excited on the string by the hammer were communicated to the soundboard at too rapid a rate, these vibrations would die down so quickly that we would hear little more than a tuned thud, a louder version of what is produced by hitting a note while a wadded handkerchief is firmly pressed against the vibrating part of the string next to the bridge. We also want the soundboard impedance to be high enough that its resonances will not play an unacceptably large role in the tuning of individual string modes. It is a long-standing practice to make piano soundboards of spruce, a wood that is both light and stiff; for discussion see tonewood.

Phoenix Piano Systems of the UK has experimented with soundboard made of carbon fiber composite, which they claim can be made with better sounding qualities than wood, and without the swelling, shrinking and cracking that affect wood. Phoenix Piano has now for sale pianos with carbon fiber composite soundboard, built by Steingraeber & Sohne.

=== Larger soundboards ===
The Astin-Weight piano company of Salt Lake City, Utah, introduced two related innovations to the upright piano which were designed and patented by Edwin R. Astin Sr. Their purpose was to obtain the largest possible soundboard, and indeed, Astin-Weight soundboards covered the entire rear surface of the piano. This was made possible by placing the pinblock forward of the soundboard, and using a peripheral metal frame instead of back posts. The Astin-Weight piano was said to produce a very rich tone, not to every listener's taste but greatly prized by Astin-Weight owners. The company is no longer in business.

=== Extended keyboards ===
Almost every modern piano has 36 black keys and 52 white keys for a total of 88 keys (seven octaves plus a minor third, from A0 to C8). Most makers standardized around the 88 key format during the 1880s and 1890s. Many older pianos only have 85 keys (seven octaves from A0 to A7), while some manufacturers extend the range further in one or both directions.

Henri Pape experimented with an eight-octave (F-to-F) keyboard range in the mid 1840s.

Former French maker Erard (known for inventing the double escapement principle still used in grand actions today) added two extra keys at the low end (i.e., G instead of A) on some concert grands as far back as 1877, for a total of 90 keys.

Some Bösendorfer pianos extend the normal range downwards to F0 (models 213, 225 and 275) with one other model (290) going as far as a bottom C0, making a full eight-octave range. These extra keys are sometimes hidden under a small hinged lid that can be flipped down to cover the keys in order to avoid visual disorientation in a pianist unfamiliar with the extended keyboard. On others, the colours of the extra white keys are reversed (black instead of white).

The Bösendorfer extended-range pianos, while innovatory relative to the standard grand, are hardly new; they date from the early 20th century. According to the Bösendorfer firm, the impetus for building these instruments came from the celebrated pianist Ferruccio Busoni, who at the time was performing his transcriptions of organ works by J. S. Bach. He sought very deep notes to achieve a better approximation of organ sound.

The Stuart and Sons company manufactures extended-range pianos, with all of their pianos having 97 or 102 keys, and now 108. On their instruments, the note range extends from F0 or C0 to F8, a full eight or eight and a half octaves. The extra keys are the same as the other keys in appearance. Stuart and Sons introduced a 108 key piano in 2018, extending the upper range to B8.

Emánuel Moór's double-keyboard mechanism uniquely opted for a vertical, multi-manual layout to solve the physical limitations of large-interval performance.

Stephen Paulello makes a piano with 102 keys

=== Concave keyboard ===
Virtually all keyboards are built in a straight line, with the keys aligned in exactly the same direction. This practice is the simplest from the viewpoint of instrument design, but is not necessarily the optimum for the player, who must employ quite different wrist, arm, and body motions when playing at the extreme treble and bass ends of the keyboard. It also places the extreme treble and bass at a great distance from each other. An alternative is to give the keyboard a concave form, curving slightly around the player. This presents the keys at a more uniform angle and places the extreme treble and bass at a somewhat closer distance. Such a keyboard has been called "ergonomic," similarly to ergonomic keyboards used for typing.

Concave keyboards were produced from time to time from the late 18th to the early 20th century. A spectacular 21st century version was conceived by the architect Rafael Viñoly and realized in collaboration with piano maker Chris Maene of Belgium. This instrument, a full-length concert grand, not only has a concave 88-key keyboard, but is built in a laterally bulging form, so that the widest part of the case is some distance from the player. The very broad shape implies an unusually large soundboard. In addition, the strings fan out radially from the keyboard, roughly matching the orientation of their keys; hence the instrument is straight-strung rather than cross-strung, a practice held by Maene to be sonically beneficial.

=== The pedal piano redux ===
The pedal piano is a piano with both a manual keyboard and a pedal keyboard (or pedalboard). The pedalboard either plays the same piano as the manual keyboard or has its own dedicated piano.

In its modern 21st-century incarnation the pedal piano takes on two forms, namely the Borgato double piano, a dedicated installation of two grand pianos, one on the top of the other, of which the lower one is played with the pedalboard of the system; and the Pinchi Pedal System which is designed to connect any two standard grand pianos, of which the lower one is played with a pedalboard which acts on the standard grand piano manual keyboard of the lower piano through the Pinchi Pedal System.

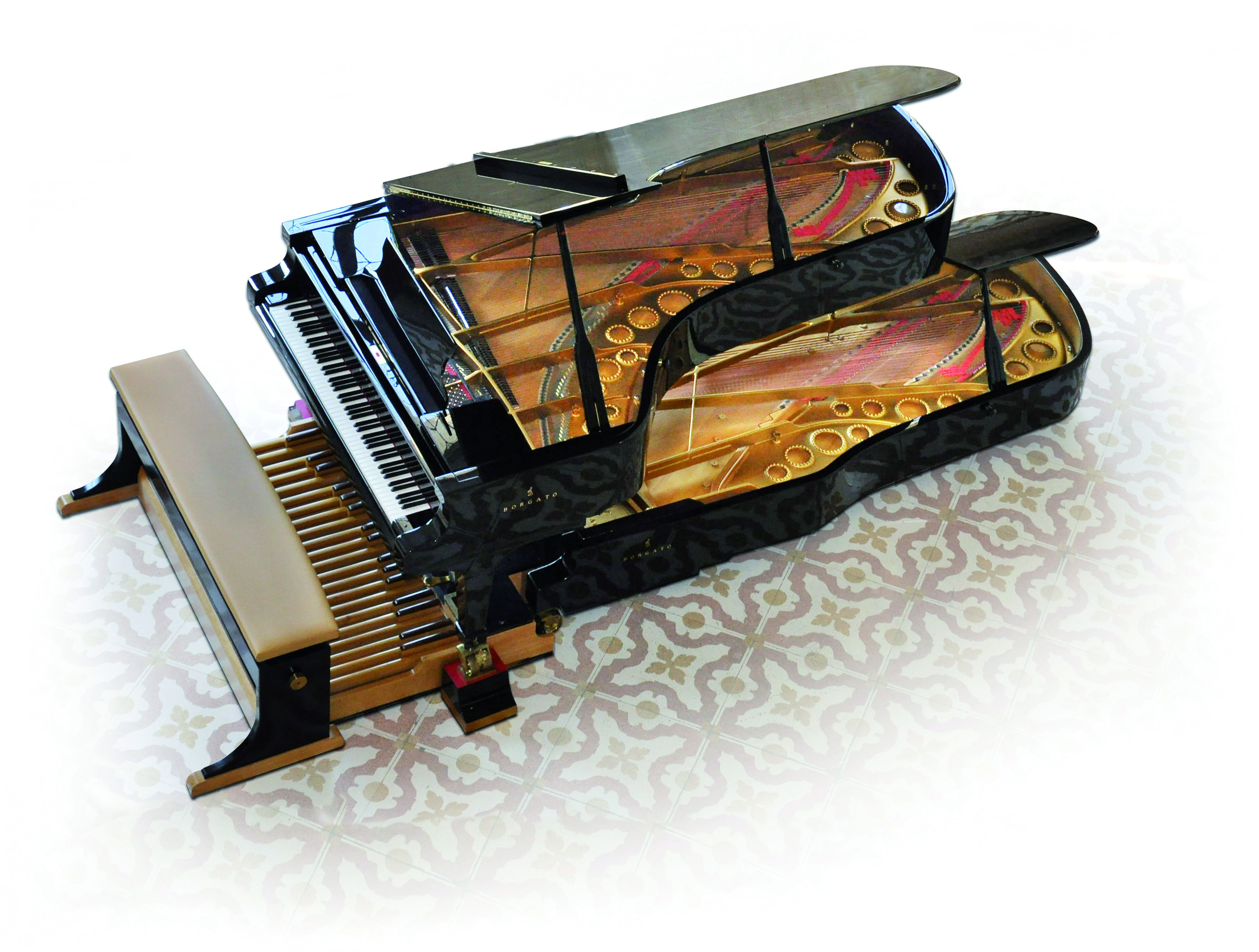
The Doppio Borgato

The Borgato workshop, in Sossano, Italy, has produced the Doppio Borgato, a large double piano with pedal board, as on an organ. The bass piano, operated by the pedals, sits under the main piano, and the damper pedals of the two are coupled. This instrument permits the performance of a variety of works written by classical composers for pedal piano.

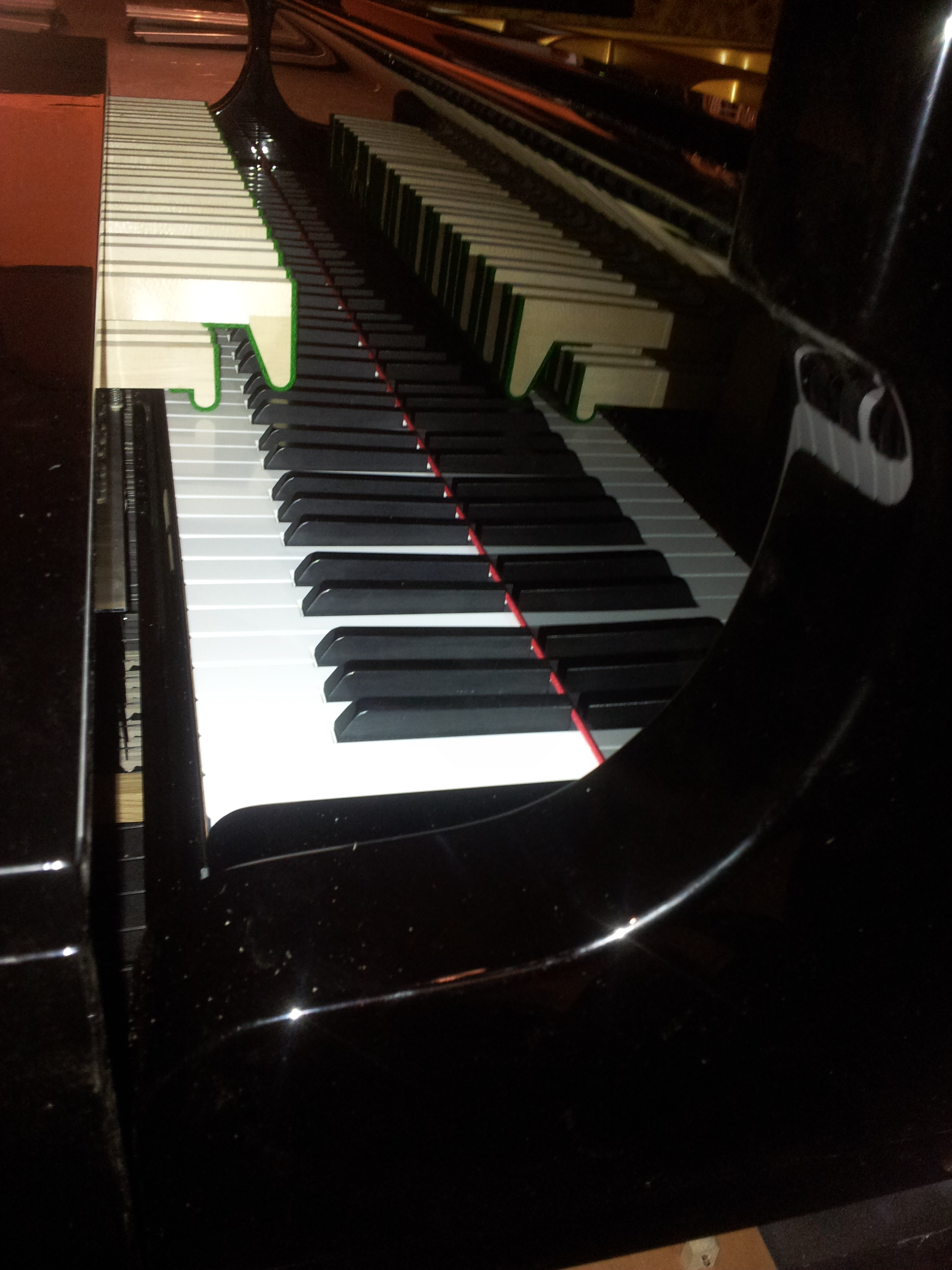
Pinchi Pedalpiano System - detail

On April 27, 2012, the Pinchi Pedalpiano System, designed by Italian organ builder Claudio Pinchi and Italian pianist Roberto Prosseda, and built by the organ building enterprise Fratelli Pinchi Ars Organi. The Fratelli Pinchi siblings are Andrea, Claudio and Barbara Pinchi. As of June 2013, the Fratelli Pinchi Ars Organi website does not provide any information regarding the Pinchi Pedalpiano System. It is a pedalboard which works with any two standard 88-key grand pianos. The Pinchi pedalboard has 37 pedals (from A to A three octaves up) but the Pinchi Pedalpiano System has a total range of five octaves, thanks to 61 wooden "fingers", as can be seen in the adjacent picture, which play, that is depress, the lower 61 keys (A0 to A5) of the lower piano, and which "fingers" are mapped to the 37 note pedalboard in three independent three octave stops (A0–A3 for 16', A1–A4 for 8', and A2–A5 for 4').

=== Aliquot stringing ===
Aliquot stringing is the use of extra unstruck strings in the piano for the purpose of enriching the tone. The aliquot stringing system was invented by Julius Blüthner in 1873. As currently implemented, the Blüthner aliquot stringing system uses a fourth string in each note of the top three octaves. This string is raised slightly with respect to the other three strings, so that it is not struck by the hammer. Whenever the hammer strikes the three conventional strings, the aliquot string vibrates sympathetically, adding to the complexity of the tone. This same string resonance effect occurs, on a more limited scale, when other notes on the piano are played that are harmonically related to the pitch of an aliquot string.

=== Tunable duplex scaling ===
Both Fazioli and Mason and Hamlin (of Haverhill, Massachusetts) employ tunable duplex scaling. The idea behind duplex scaling, invented by Theodore Steinway in 1872, is that the non-speaking portion of the string, located between the non-speaking bridge pin and the hitch pin (formerly considered the "waste end" and damped with a strip of cloth), resounds in sympathy with the vibrating portion of the string. Steinway & Sons' earliest employment of the duplex scale made use of aliquots, individually positionable (hence tunable) contact points, where each note of the duplex scale bears a perfect harmonic, intervallic relationship to its speaking length, i.e., an octave or fifth whether doubled or tripled. Because it was time-consuming to correctly position each aliquot, Steinway abandoned individual aliquots for continuous cast metal bars, each comprising an entire section of duplex bridge points. Their feeling was that with an accurately templated bridge and carefully located duplex bar, the same result would be achieved with far less fuss.

Mason & Hamlin, however, embraced Theodore Steinway's original idea. They felt that the tuning of these short stretches of free string can be achieved with greater accuracy than can be attained with a duplex bar. With the fixed points of a duplex bar, small variations in casting are liable to produce imperfections in the duplex string lengths. Furthermore, since variations in humidity can cause duplex scales to move in pitch more rapidly than the speaking scale, manual readjustment of the string tension on the non-speaking side of the bridge, and/or a readjustment of the duplex position to better accommodate humidity fluctuation, is feasible with individual aliquots.

More recently, Fazioli has modified Theodore Steinway's original idea by creating a stainless-steel track, fixed to the cast iron plate, on which aliquots slide. This system improves the ease with which aliquots can be adjusted, both during manufacture and during subsequent service.

=== Four strings per note ===
Borgato pianos also feature four strings per note in the treble section. The fourth string is actually struck, and is not an aliquot string as in Blüthner pianos. This practice has been seen at various times in the history of the piano: an early example was given by Conrad Graf to Ludwig van Beethoven, and later examples are seen ca. 1900 (Luis Casali, Barcelona) and 1940 (August Förster).

=== Size ===
Fazioli has also made bold efforts in increasing the sheer size of the piano: their model F308 is the largest regular production piano currently built, being 10 feet 2 inches (3.10 m) long and one and a half times as heavy as the popular Steinway model D.

The Rubenstein R-371 is a custom built piano that is 12 feet 2 inches long (3.71 m), weighs 2,500 lb (1,100 kg), and features a jig-welded steel plate.

Steinbuhler & Company produce keyboards that are 7/8 and 15/16 normal size. The keyboards were designed to make it possible for players with smaller hands to play a larger range of music. The company sells keyboard inserts for Grand pianos and complete upright pianos with smaller (7/8) keyboards.

The Modell 370i, built by David Klavins, is a custom 88-key upright piano permanently installed at the University of Tübingen in Germany. The number 370 refers to the number of centimeters of the height of the piano (12 feet), while the i stands for "integrated" (into a building, as opposed to free-standing). The keyboard and action are situated near the top of the piano. In order to play the instrument, a performer must climb a flight of stairs to an elevated platform and walk around to sit down in front of the piano. The entire piano weighs two thousand pounds. The frame and soundboard of the piano are supported by two vertical beams of steel, and the fully exposed soundboard has over twice the area of the Steinway Model D. The lowest bass string (A0) is only 3mm thick, and its speaking length is 9.94 feet. Klavins is also planning the installation of a Modell 450i, which will be nearly 15 feet tall and include 102 notes, from a low C0 (like the Bösendorfer Imperial 290) to F8, five notes above the highest C on most pianos.

Adrian Mann of New Zealand started on a project of building a 5.7 m (18.7 ft) long piano when he was aged 16. Known as the Alexander piano, it has been played by many artists.

=== Pianos of unusual appearance ===
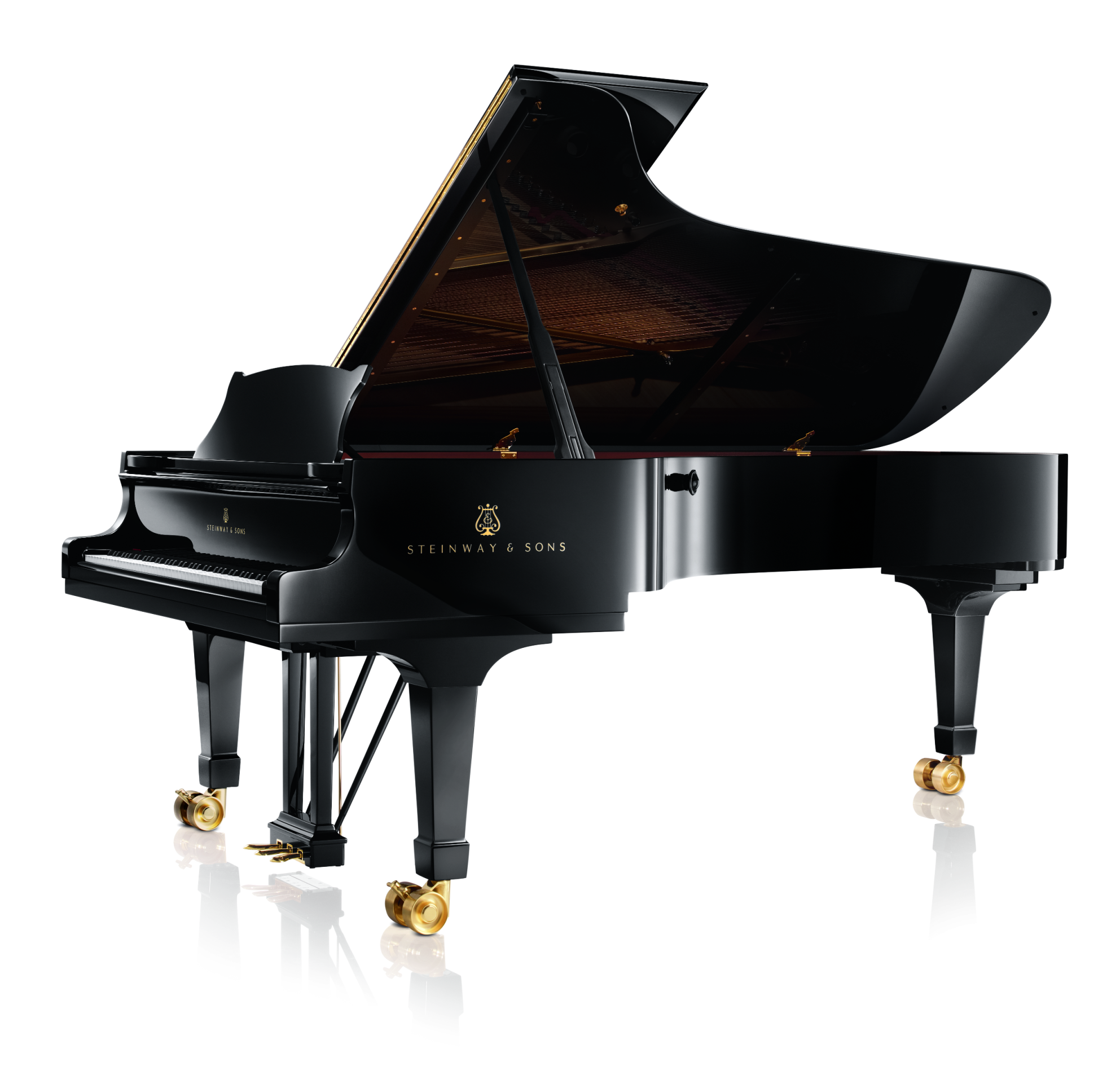
The Steinway Model D, the most commonly used modern concert grand

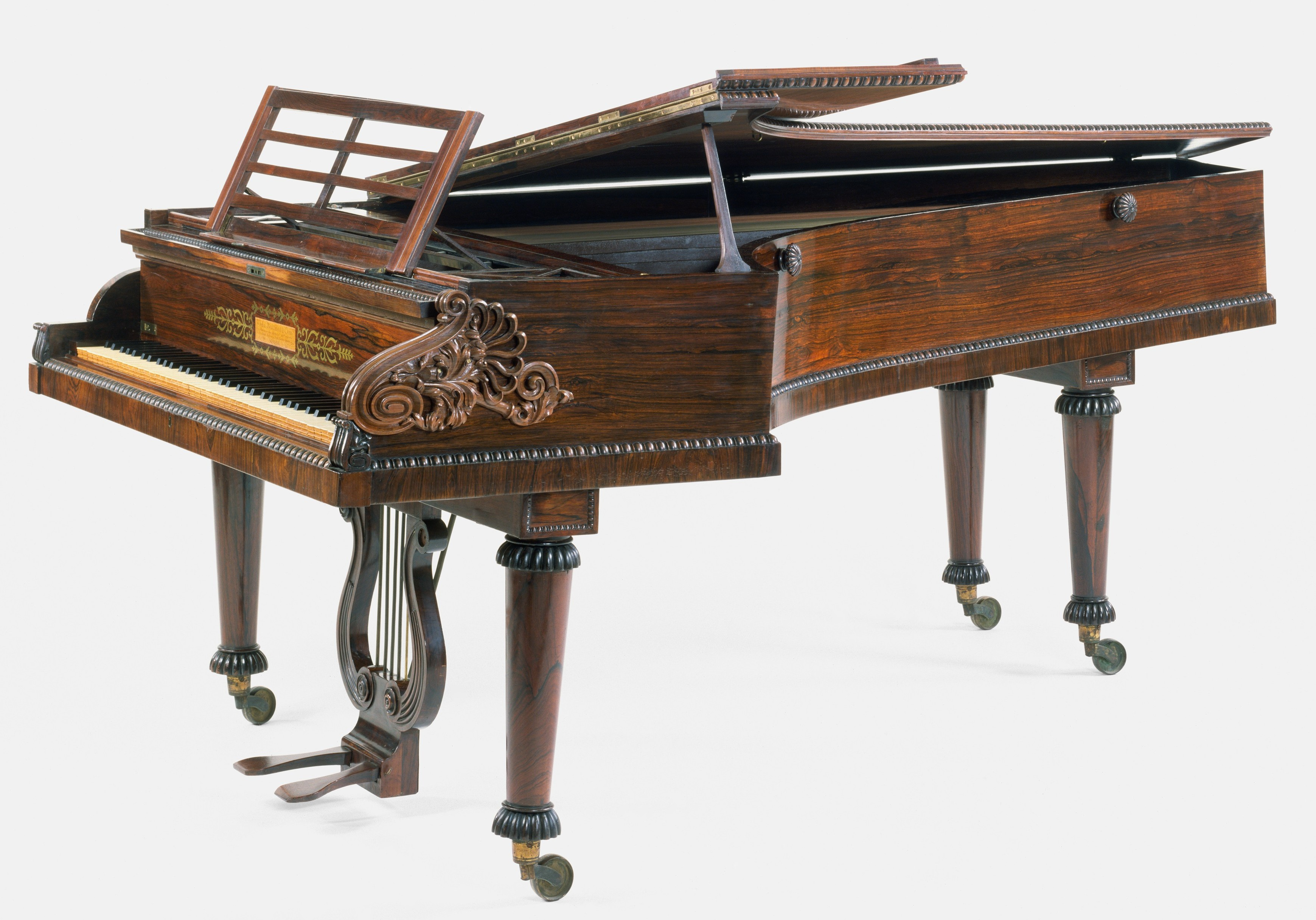
A piano from 1827 by the English firm Broadwood and Sons; it has sculpted legs and employs a lyre shape to support the pedals.

The concert grands that appear on world's stages bear very little overt decoration. Normally, they are a uniform black, with plain legs of square cross-section and square, purely functional frames to hold the pedals. This approach was not the norm for keyboard instruments at earlier stages of history: 19th century pianos often had cases in veneered wood, with elaborated carved music stands and legs, and often gilded highlights. Going back further, the piano's immediate ancestor, the harpsichord, was often decorated with great exuberance, often in bright colors and in some cases with artwork made by skilled painters. Creative modern piano companies today occasionally offer models that are designed by artists and are intended to break out of the prevalent plain-black pattern.

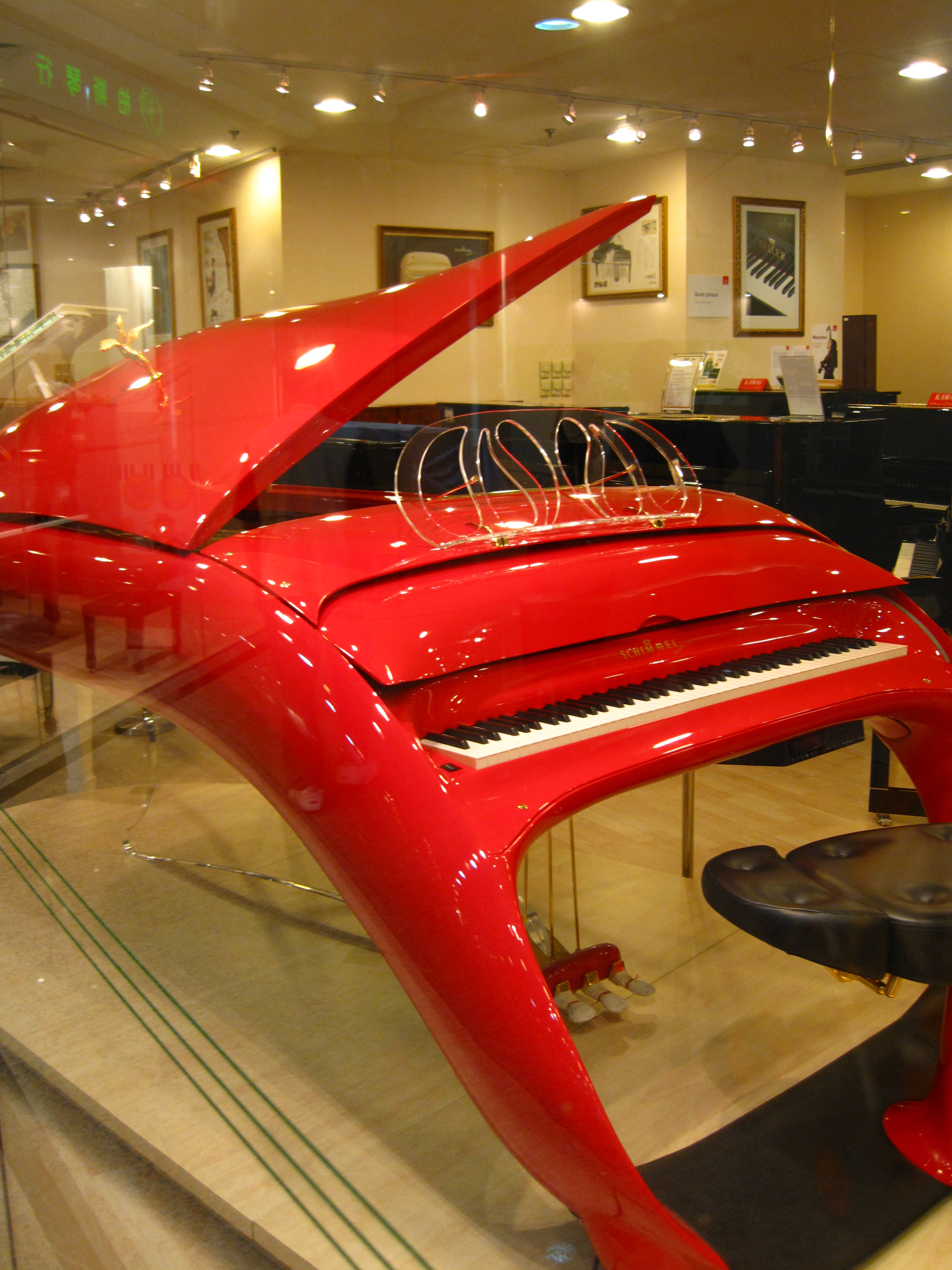
The Pegasus piano, made by the Schimmel firm

The Schimmel piano company has made experiments along these lines. These include a grand piano whose rim, lid, and other case parts are made of acrylic glass. The acoustic properties of the material used are claimed to be excellent. However, the somewhat lurid appearance of the acrylic piano, as well as its high cost, have kept it a novelty item. Schimmel has also teamed up with artists Otmar Alt and Luigi Colani to produce other pianos of breathtakingly unconventional appearance; see figure at right.

While the Steinway firm's mainline offerings are very sober-looking, as discussed above, they do offer individual customers a variety of rather flamboyant forms of decoration as a "bespoke" option. In 1988, the firm created a visually very striking special version of its model D concert grand to commemorate the company's 135th anniversary. This piano bears serial number 500,000.

== Digital innovations ==
Digital technology makes possible a vastly more sensitive and flexible version of the old player piano; for instance, the modern digital player piano can record as well as play. These pianos are often called 'hybrid pianos', as they have characteristics of both acoustic pianos (the piano sound is made by hammers on strings) and digital pianos (record/playback capability, as well as synthesizer and audio sound capability). Currently, five major manufacturers compete in this market; see links below.

The stringless electronic keyboard and digital piano continue to make progress, as their portability and range of synthesized sounds has made them popular.

== See also ==
- Disklavier, a line of acoustic pianos from Yamaha Corporation augmented with digital performance capture, recording, and reproduction features.
