= Doppio Borgato =

Pedal piano made by joining a regular concert grand with a second piano

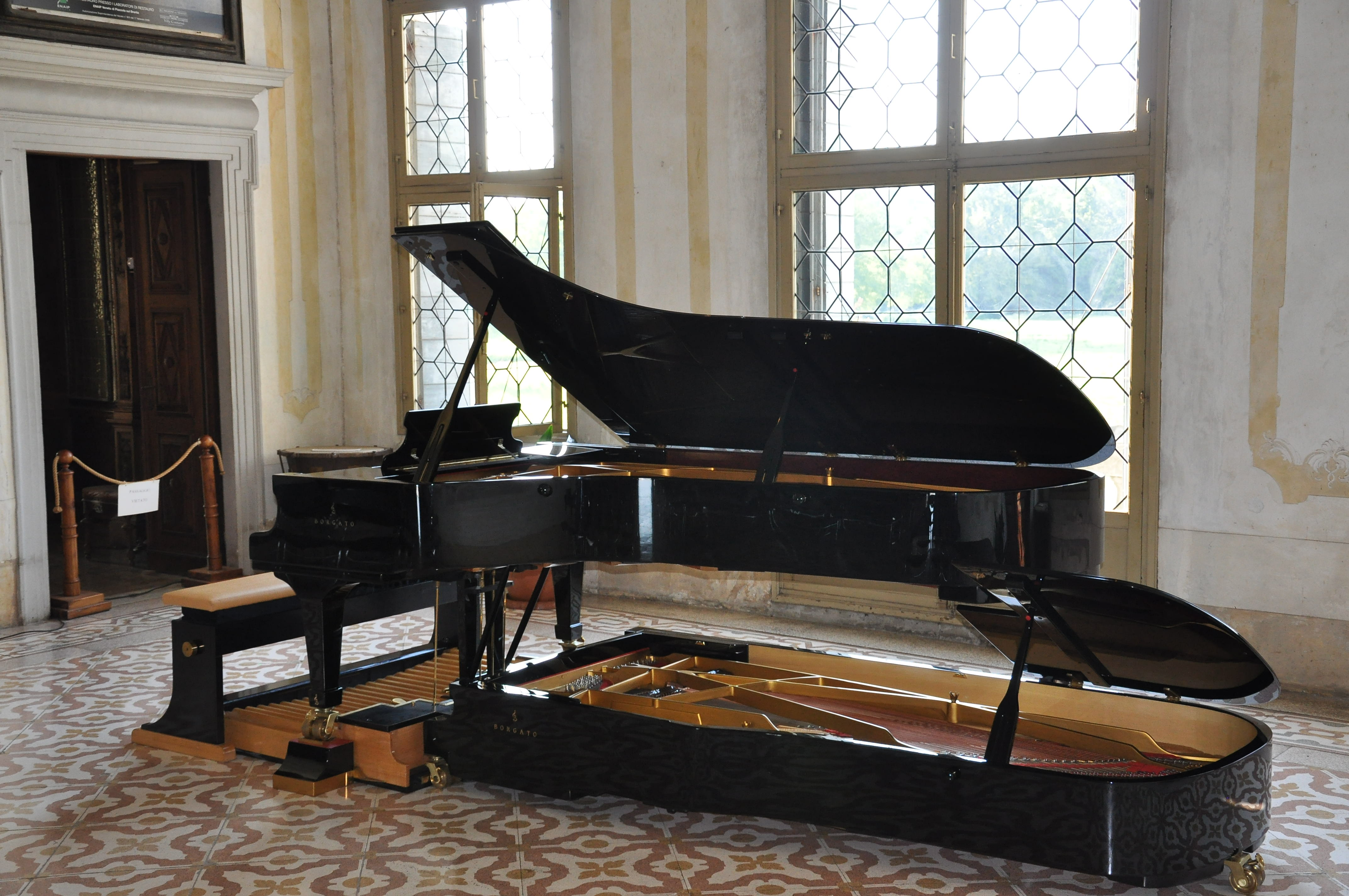
Doppio Borgato

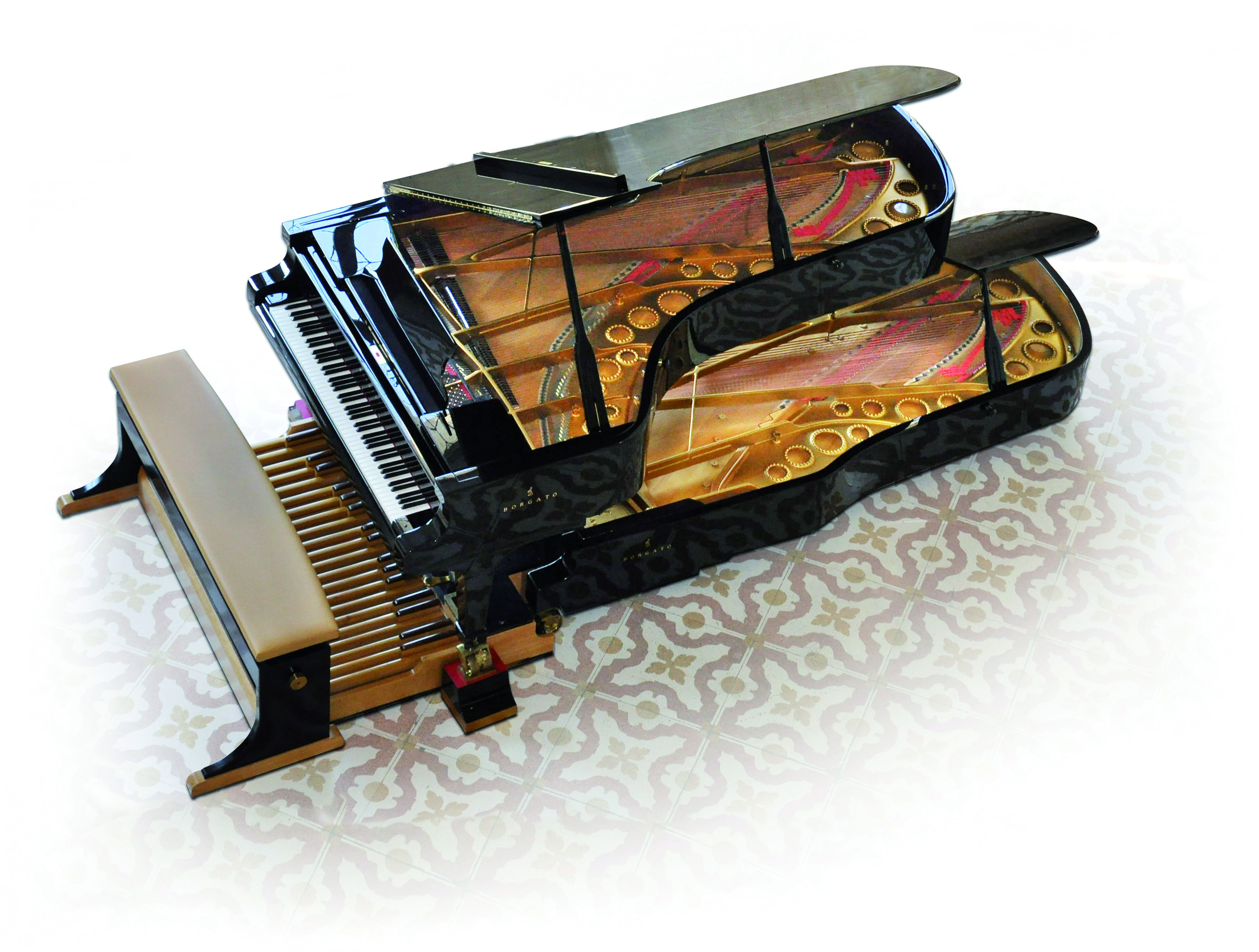
Doppio Borgato

Doppio Borgato is a Pedal piano made by joining a regular concert grand (Model L 282) with a second piano, activated by a pedal board with 37 pedals (A0 to A3), similar to that of the organ (P 398). Designed and manufactured by Luigi Borgato, it was patented in 2000.

== Compositions for Doppio Borgato ==
Pieces specifically composed for the Doppio Borgato are :

- Cristian Carrara
  - "Magnificat, Meditation" for piano with pedalboard and orchestra (2011)
- Giuseppe Lupis
  - Gounod-Lupis "Marche funèbre d'une marionnette" (2011)
- Nimrod Borenstein
  - "Fireworks" Op. 57 (2011)
  - Grieg-Borenstein "In the hall of the mountain-king" arranged for piano with pedalboard (2011)
- Michael Glenn Williams
  - "Tip Tap" (2011)
- Ennio Morricone (1928–2020)
  - "Quarto Studio Bis" (2011)
- Andrea Morricone (born 1964)
  - "Omaggio a J.S.B." (2011)
- Franco Oppo (1935–2016)
  - "Freu dich sehr o meine Seele" (2000)
- Fabrizio Marchionni (born 1976)
  - "S’Indàssa" (2000)
- Charlemagne Palestine (1945 or 1947-)
  - Compositions for pedal piano (2005)
- Jean Guillou (1930–2019)
  - "Epitases" (2001)
- Anything written for Pipe Organ can also be played on the Doppio Borgato Pedal piano.
