= Luigi Borgato =

Italian piano maker

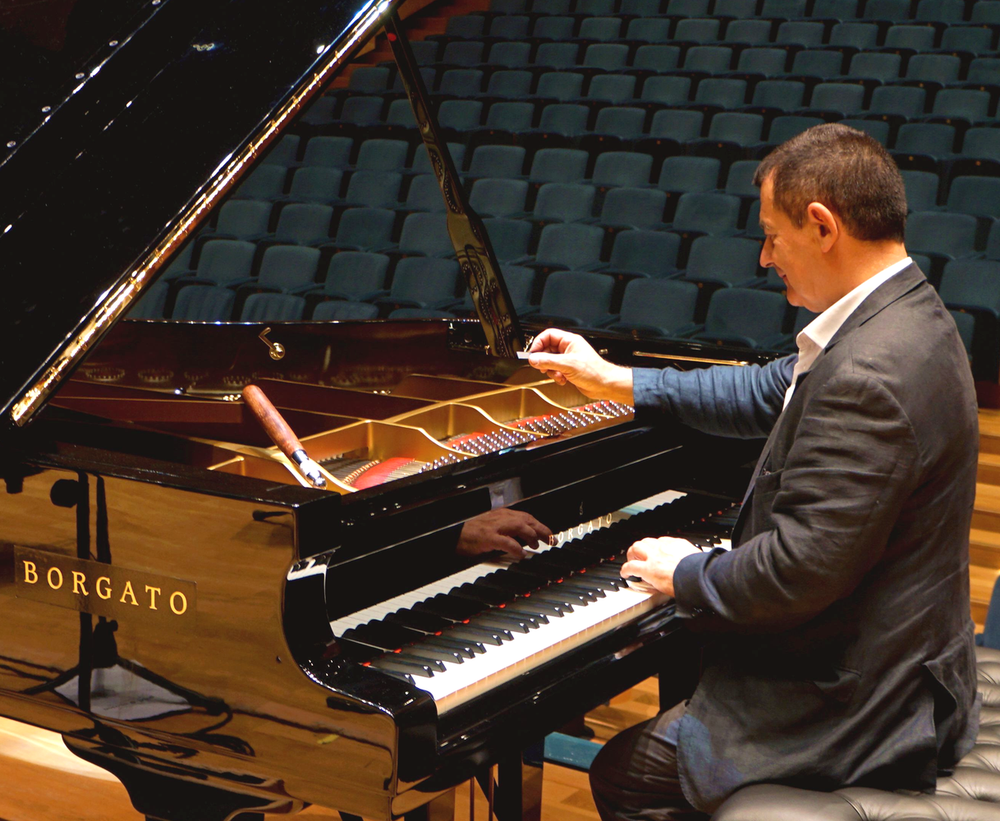
Luigi Borgato

Luigi Borgato (born in Gallarate, February 21, 1963) is an Italian piano-maker and craftsman of handcrafted grand pianos.

A master builder from Padua, Veneto, he improved and innovated technical aspects of piano making, which were later patented. In his capacity as master piano-maker he has been invited by Italian and foreign institutions to run courses on piano construction and technology.

== Profile ==
In 1986, at the age of 23, he built his first piano. In 1991, at the age of 28, he presented his first completely handmade concert-grand piano at the European congress Europiano.

Luigi Borgato personally selects the woods and chooses all the materials and components for the construction of his pianos. He is also a technician-tuner and fine-tunes his own instruments for concerts and recordings assisting internationally renowned pianists. The pianos he built have been appreciated by internationally renowned artists such as: Radu Lupu, András Schiff, Vladimir Ashkenazy, Rosalyn Tureck, Jerome Rose, Lazar Berman, Maria João Pires, Ingolf Wunder, Roberto Prosseda, Martin Berkofsky, Antonio Ballista, Bruno Canino, Michele Campanella, Semion Balshem, Jean Guillou, Charlemagne Palestine, Cameron Carpenter, Johannes Skudlik, Giorgio Carnini, Mirco Bruson

== Patents ==
=== Borgato Concert Grand L282 ===
Luigi Borgato registered various patents. His first patent in 1991 provided the upper register of the keyboard with four strings struck per note in the 44 keys of the upper register and changes to the design of the iron frame.

=== Doppio Borgato ===
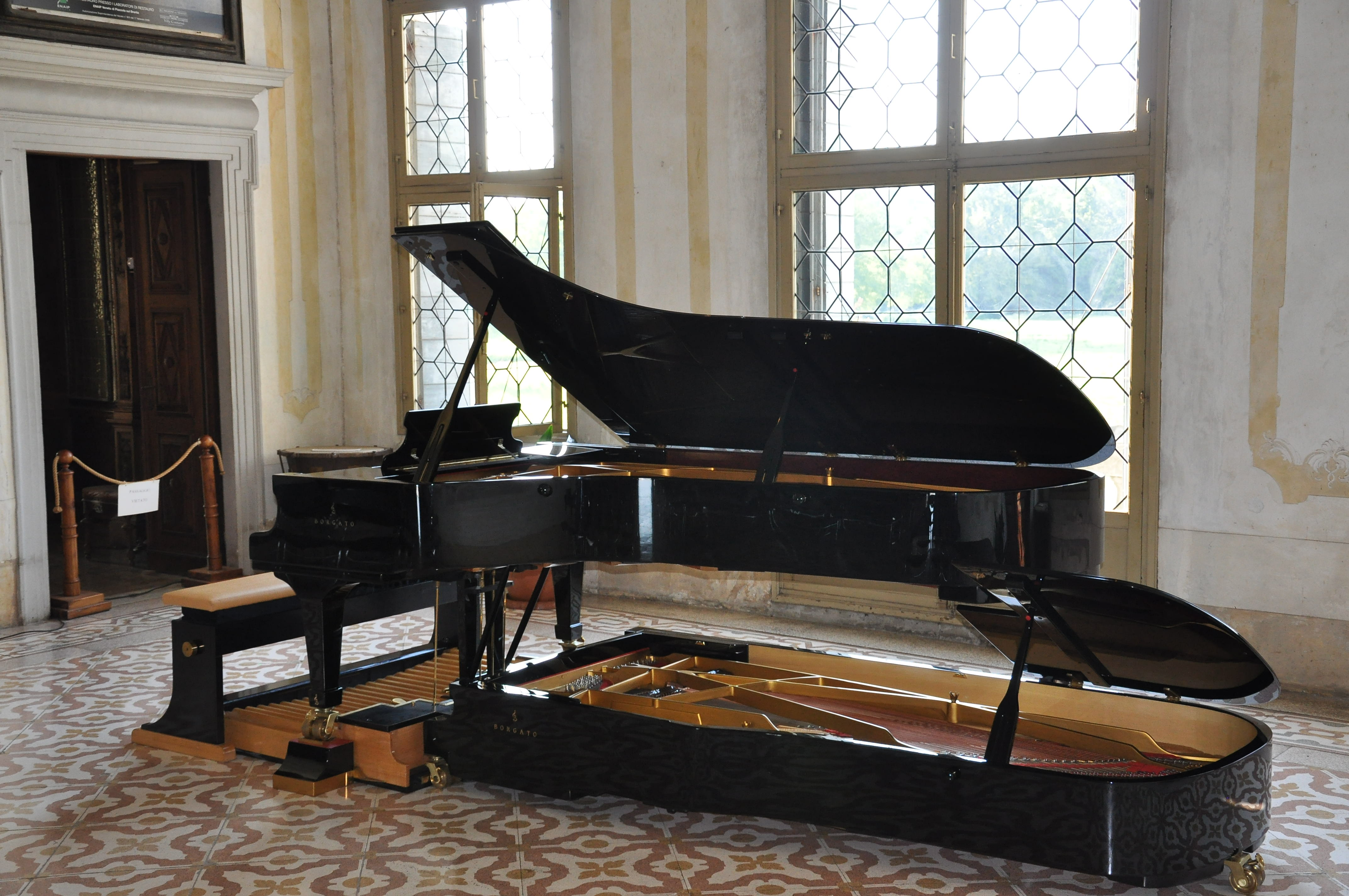
Doppio Borgato

In 2000, he registered a second patent. Inspired by compositions written for pianos with pedalboards, he designed and built a new instrument called the Doppio Borgato, which is the first double concert-grand piano with pedalboard constructed in modern times.

=== Borgato Grand Prix 333 ===
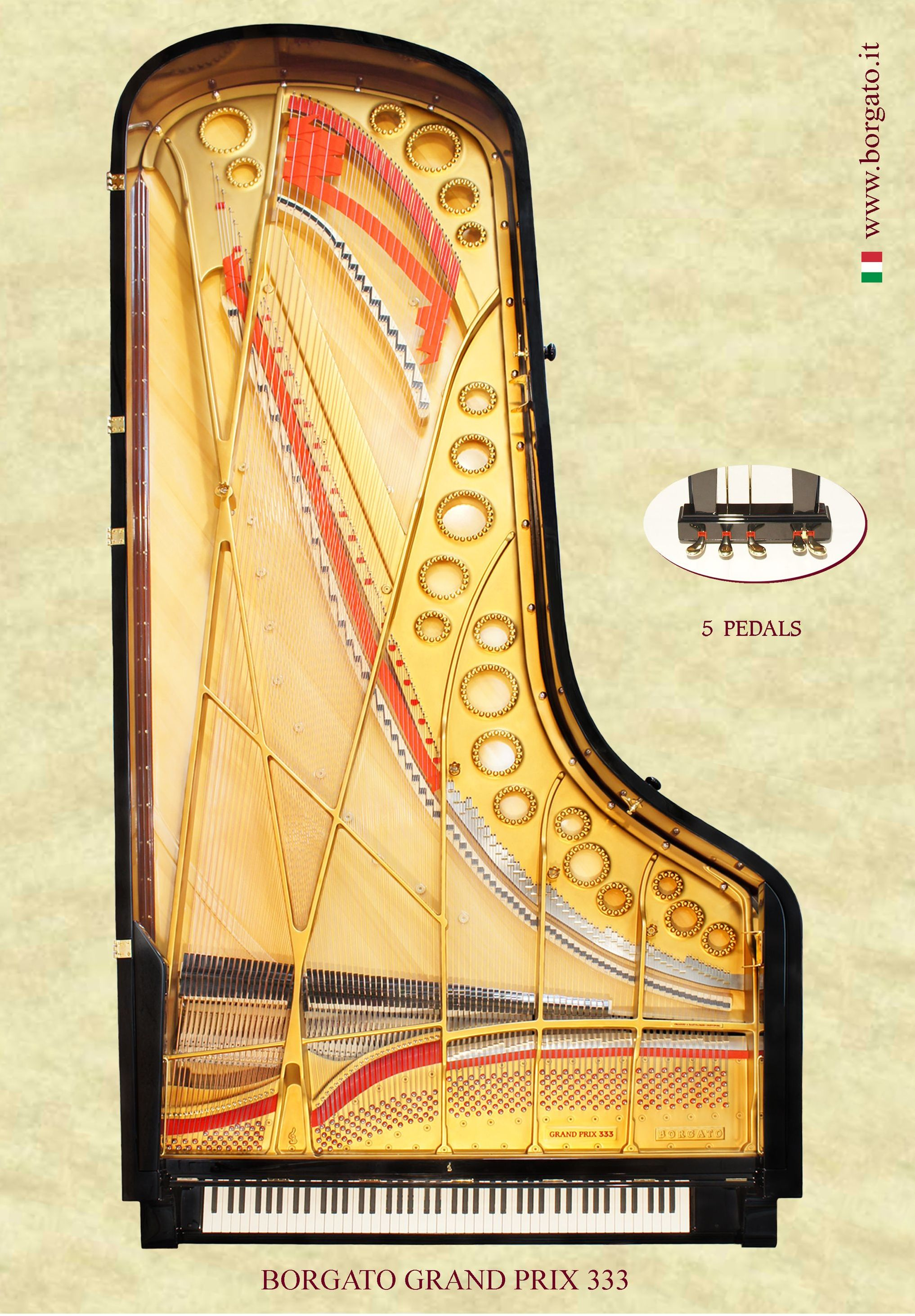
Borgato Grand Prix 333

In August 2017 he produced a large "stage" concert grand piano called "Borgato Grand Prix 333", 3.33 metres (10.9 ft) long.

== Bibliography ==
- Larry E.Ashley, Pierce Piano Atlas, 12th edition, Larry E.Ashley Publisher, Albuquerque NM U.S.A., 2008, p. 58
- Géreard Gefen, Piano, Editions du Chêne - Hachette Livre, 2002, pp. 59, 166, 170, 180
- Atanasio Cecchini, Piano Dream. History of the Piano, Mosè Editions, 2007, pp. 170-171
- Dario Miozzi, in Musica Rivista di cultura musicale e discografica, Zecchini Editions, December 2010 - January 2011, pp. 54, 59-60
- Alessandro Beltrami, Avvenire, 2010 Sunday August 15
- Franco Pepe, in AreaArte, Summer 2010
- Luca Segalla, in Musica, Rivista di cultura musicale e discografica, Zecchini Editions, March 2011 p. 28
- Stuart Isacoff, on the book A Natural History of the Piano, The Instrument, the Music, the Musicians—from Mozart to Modern Jazz and Everything in Between, edited by Alfred A. Knopf, New York 2011, p. 48
- Enzo Beacco, Galassia Pianoforte, Una storia di compositori, interpreti e costruttori, ilSaggiatore, 2025, pp. 39, 53, 434
- Autori vari, Alfonso Alberti, Emanuele Arciuli, Giovanni Paolo di Stefano, Leonardo Miucci, Francesco Pareti, Guido Salvetti, Maria Grazia Sità, Stefano Zenni, Il Pianoforte, I Manuali EDT/SIdM, 2018, tav. 24
- Autori vari, Ettore Borri, Giovanni Paolo Di Stefano, Anelide Nascimbeni, Alessandro Marangoni, Manuel Caruso, Piero Rattalino, Oreste Bossini, Alfonso Alberti, Luciano Del Rio, Anna Doria, Il Pianoforte e la musica pianistica italiana, una ricchezza da scoprire nell'interazione tra costruttori, compositori, didatti e grandi interpreti, Zecchini Editore, maggio 2024, p. 128
- Witold Rybczynski, The Perfect House A journey with the reneissance Master Andrea Palladio, Scribner New York 2002, p. 64
- Winfried W. Weber, Reihe Management und Praktische Philosophie, Innovation durch Injunktion, warum man Innovtionen nicht planen (lassen) kann, Verlag Sordon Göttingen 2005, pp. 105, 142
