= Agraffe =

Internal part of a grand piano

An agraffe is a part used principally on grand pianos. The agraffe is a guide at the tuning-pin end of the string, screwed into the plate, with holes through which the strings pass. It positions the strings vertically and laterally, determines the string's speaking length, and offers a clean termination from which the string can vibrate. Agraffes are used in the bass, tenor, and lower treble, but commonly give way to a capo d'astro bar in the upper treble.

Agraffes are usually made of solid brass, and come in 1, 2 or 3-string configurations. For American pianos they are available in two sizes (1/4" and 7/32" finely threaded studs). The string holes are typically countersunk to eliminate the likelihood of buzzing, even as the agraffes wear. They are installed with their width perpendicular to the strings.

== See also ==
- Innovations in the piano
