= Alessandra Ammara =

Italian pianist

Alessandra Ammara (born Florence, Italy, 1972) is an Italian classical pianist and piano teacher.

== Biography ==
Alessandra Ammara performed at Musikverein in Wien, at Festspielhaus in Salzburg, at Philharmonie in Berlin and at the Concertgebouw in Amsterdam. Her debut in Washington was reviewed by The Washington Post''. Since 1999, she forms a piano duet with her husband Roberto Prosseda. In May 2013, after some years dedicated to the family and her two young children, Alessandra Ammara has come back in the international concert career.

== Recordings ==
- Caetani: Piano Music (Brilliant Classics 94909, 2014)
- DVD "The Chigi Recital", including complete performances of Chopin's 24 Preludes and Ravel's Gaspard de la Nuit (Continuo Records, 2013) ]
- Ravel: Miroirs, Gaspard de la Nuit, Sonatine, Jeaux d'eau, Sérénade grotesque (Arts, 2013)
- Schumann: Album for the Young op. 68 (Arts, 2011) ]
- Schumann: Carnaval, Davidsbündlertänze (Arts, 2010)
- Scelsi: Preludes (Arts, 2009) ]
- Chopin: 4 Ballades, Fantaisie, Barcarolle (Arts, 2008)
- Chopin: Polonaises (CD part of the Chopin Complete Piano Works, Brilliant Classics, 2009)
- Debussy: Images, Scriabin: Etudes op. 42, Chopin: 24 Preludes op. 28 (Arktos, 2003)
