= Johannes Skudlik =

German organist and conductor

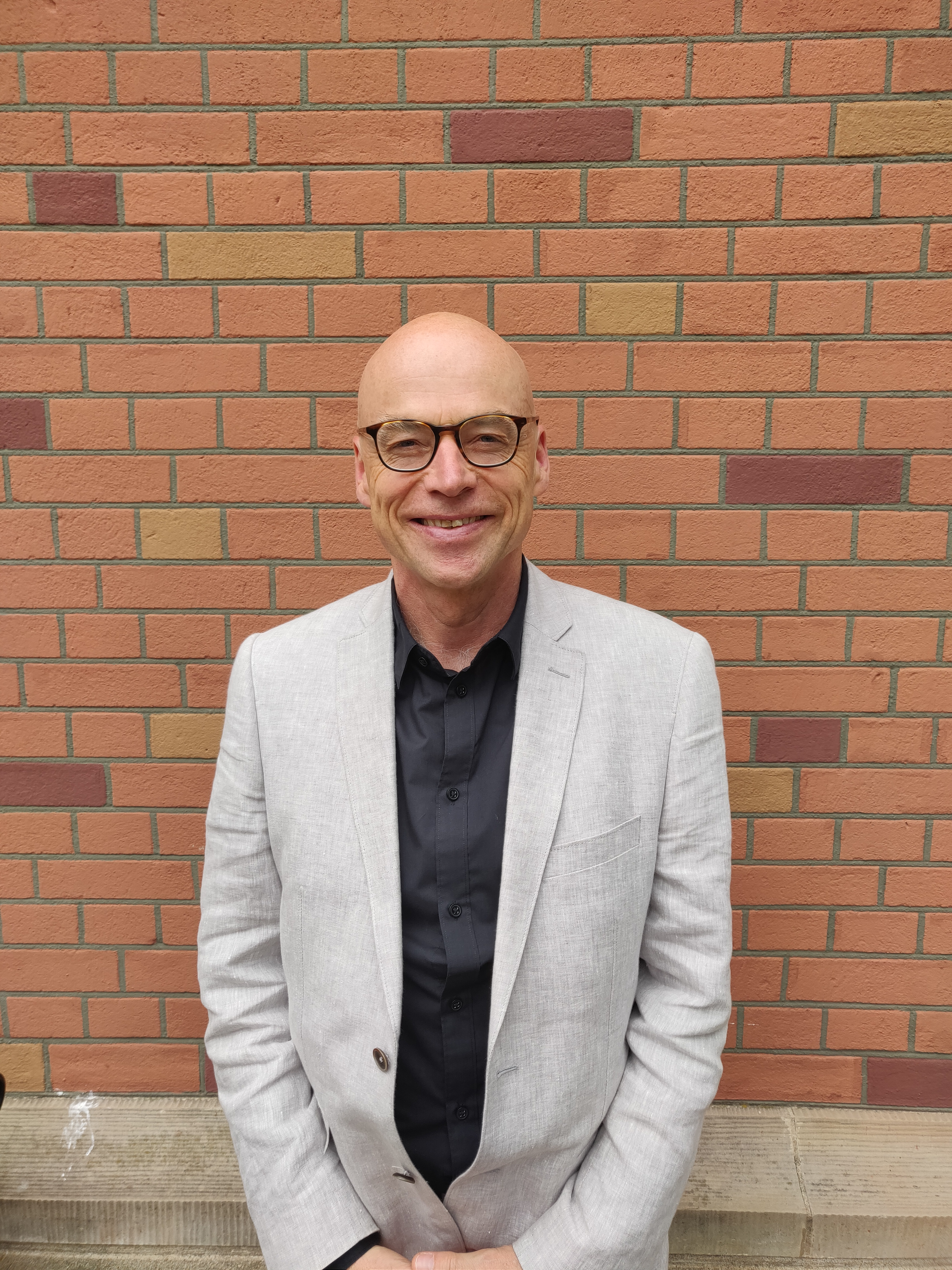
Johannes Skudlik (2020)

Johannes Skudlik (born 16 February 1957) is a German organist and conductor.

== Life ==
Skudlik was born in Munich. After the Abitur, he studied church music and the organ at the University of Music and Performing Arts Munich with Gerhard Weinberger and Franz Lehrndorfer and successfully completed the A-Examination. Since 1979, Skudlik has been cantor at the Mariae Himmelfahrt parish church in Landsberg am Lech. He founded and conducts the Landsberg Oratorio Choir, the Capella Cantabile Landsberg, the Con-brio Chamber Orchestra and the Europa Antiqua Consort for early music.

With various vocal and instrumental ensembles, Skudlik has been a guest at festivals in France, Italy, Spain, Portugal and Greece. As a conductor, he has also appeared with symphonic works by Mozart, Beethoven, Schubert, Mendelssohn, Brahms, Bruckner, Tchaikovsky and Mahler, often together with members of the Berlin Philharmonic, the Symphony Orchestra of the Bayerischer Rundfunk and the Munich Radio Orchestra.

In 2008, Skudlik conducted the Orchestra of the Age of Enlightenment in a performance of Bach's Mass in B minor. In the same year, Skudlik gave a concert on the "Doppio Borgato", the pedal piano of the Italian pianist maker Luigi Borgato, which was performed for the first time in Germany.

Skudlik is often engaged as interpreter or conductor of world premieres. A particularly close collaboration links him with the composer Enjott Schneider and, more recently, with the composer and organist Jean Guillou. In the meantime, more than 20 CD recordings with harpsichord, organ and chamber music as well as choral and oratorical works are available on the labels ambitus and Motette. Radio recordings were produced in cooperation with RIAS Berlin, WGBH Radio Boston, the Polish Television, the Rai 1 and the Bayerischer Rundfunk.

Skudlik is artistic director of the "Landsberg Concerts", the "Bavarian Organ Summer", which was held for the first time in 2008, and the Palermo Organ Festival. He is also the initiator, artistic director and performer at European festivals: 2005 "Europe's Organ Festival Via Claudia Augusta"; 2006 "Mozart on his journey to...", 2008 at the "Euro-Via-Festival Paths to Rome" and in 2011 "Euro-Via-Festival: From Rome To Santiago". Furthermore, Skudlik is artistic director of the International Organ Competition "Orgelstadt Landsberg".

In 2009 and 2010, Skudlik devoted himself mainly to the works of Jean Guillou: Guillou's La Révolte des Orgues for 9 organs, percussion and conductors was performed under Skudlik's direction in the Philharmonic Orchestras of Munich, Berlin and Cologne and further in Paris, Rome, Gdansk and Porto. In April 2018, the work was performed at the Elbphilharmonie on the occasion of Jean Guillou's 88th birthday.
