= Cristian Carrara =

Italian composer

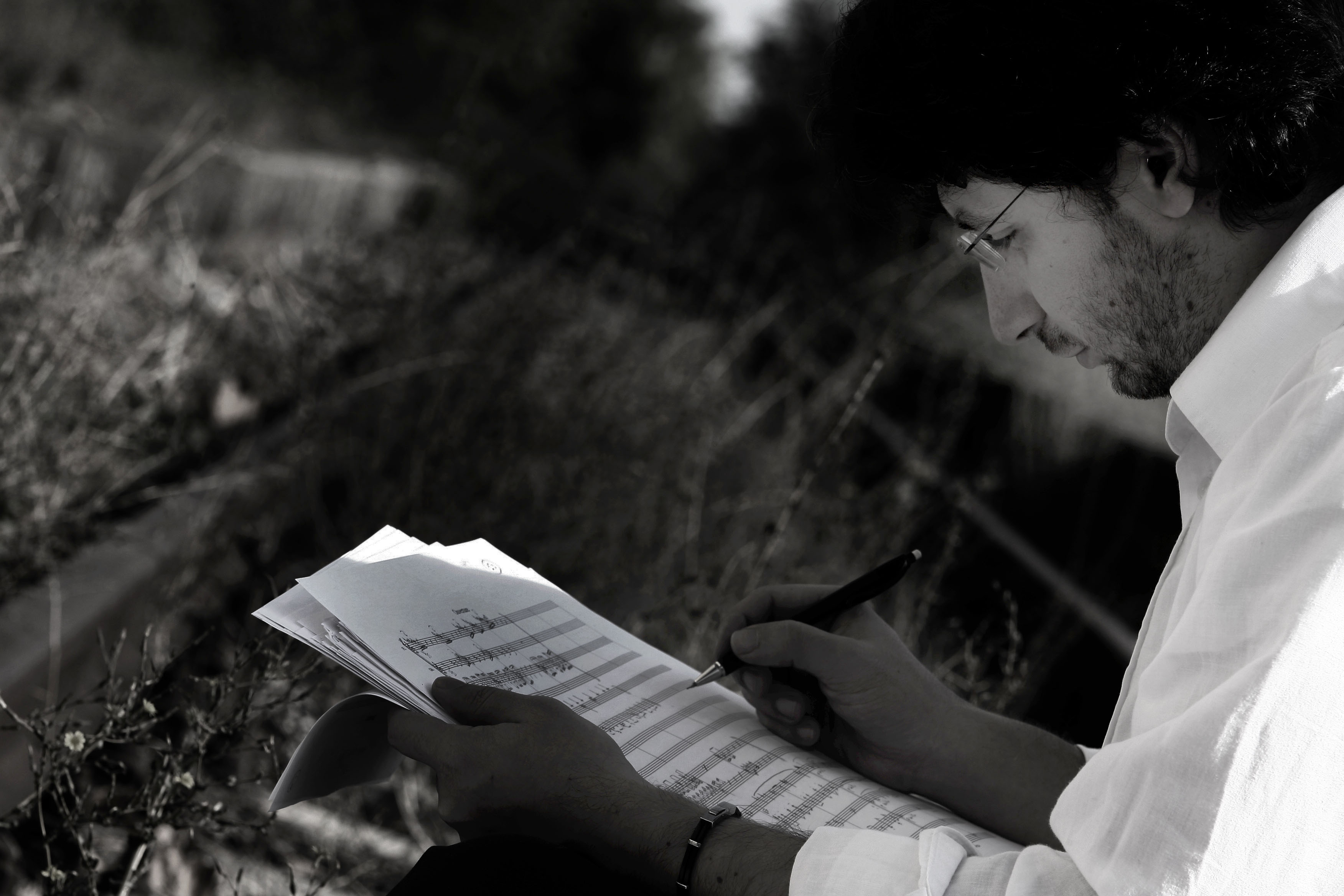
Cristian Carrara

Cristian Carrara (born January 28, 1977) is an Italian composer who is active in the Italian social and institutional scene.

== Early life ==
Carrara was born in Pordenone, Italy. He studied composition at the Conservatory "Jacopo Tomadini" in Udine. His work includes symphonic and chamber music as well as music for opera, musical theatre and television.

His compositions have been performed at venues and festivals including the Accademia Nazionale di Santa Cecilia in Rome, the Maggio Musicale Fiorentino, Teatro La Fenice in Venice, the Berliner Philharmonie and the Binyanei Hauma Auditorium in Jerusalem.

Carrara has collaborated with conductors and performers including John Neschling, Omer Meir Wellber, Nir Kabaretti, Lior Shambadal, Roberto Prosseda, Francesca Dego and Danusha Waskiewicz.

His music has been performed by orchestras and ensembles including the London Philharmonic Orchestra, Filarmonica Arturo Toscanini, Orchestra della Toscana, Orchestra del Maggio Musicale Fiorentino, Filarmonica della Fenice, Orchestra del Teatro Carlo Felice di Genova, Orchestra del Teatro Lirico di Cagliari, Qatar Philharmonic Orchestra, Berliner Symphoniker and Slovenian Philharmonic Orchestra.

== Works ==
Carrara's catalogue includes orchestral, chamber, solo, choral and operatic compositions.

His stage works include La piccola vedetta lombarda (2011), Oliver Twist (2012), Il giocatore (2014), La canzone dei luoghi comuni (2014), Faust (2015), Cenerentola (2016), Sola Beatitudo (2017), Rapimenti d'amore (2021), Transitus (2022), Voci da Hebron (2024), La Benedizione (2024) and 55 secondi (2026).

=== Concertos ===
Carrara has composed several works for solo instruments and orchestra, including The Waste Land for viola, Machpela for violin and cello, Luci danzanti nella notte for violin, War Silence for piano and Rosso Ferrari for accordion.

The Waste Land was presented at Mittelfest in 2016 with the Slovenian Philharmonic, conducted by Nir Kabaretti, with Danusha Waskiewicz as viola soloist.

Machpela received its world premiere in 2016 with the Santa Barbara Symphony, conducted by Nir Kabaretti, with Francesca Dego on violin and Robert DeMaine on cello.

Luci danzanti nella notte was performed by the Filarmonica Arturo Toscanini with Francesca Dego as violin soloist.

War Silence is a piano concerto recorded by Roberto Prosseda with the London Philharmonic Orchestra under Nir Kabaretti.

Rosso Ferrari is a concerto for accordion and orchestra commissioned by Orchestra della Toscana, Musica Insieme Bologna, Richmond Symphony Orchestra, Santa Barbara Symphony Orchestra and the FVG Orchestra.

=== Orchestra and chamber music ===
His orchestral works include Magnificat, Destinazione del sangue, Liber Mundi, Tales from the Underground, Ondanomala, Vivaldi. In memoriam, Music, when soft voices die and Festa!.

His instrumental works include The Devil's Bridge for cello and orchestra, O somma luce for flute and choir and 4 emotions for flute and string orchestra.

=== Cenerentola ===
Cenerentola was commissioned for the Teatro Petruzzelli in Bari and premiered in 2016. The production received numerous performances at the theatre.

=== Rapimenti d'amore ===
Rapimenti d'amore was commissioned by the Teatro Coccia in Novara and premiered in 2021. The opera is dedicated to Dante and forms part of Carrara's work in contemporary Italian opera.

=== Voci da Hebron ===
Voci da Hebron is a one-act opera with music by Carrara and a libretto by Sandro Cappelletto. It was commissioned by the Opéra-Théâtre de l'Eurométropole de Metz and the Teatro Comunale Pavarotti-Freni in Modena.

The opera is set against the Israeli-Palestinian conflict and explores themes of conflict, communication and dialogue.

A recording of Voci da Hebron was released by Naxos in 2025. The recording features the Ensemble della Filarmonica del Teatro Comunale di Modena conducted by Arthur Fagen.

The work has also received critical attention. A review by Thea Derks discussed Carrara's use of different musical styles, including lyrical writing, repetitive patterns and Arabic-influenced melodies, and examined the opera's treatment of emotions including fear, anger and the need for connection.

=== La Benedizione ===
La Benedizione, with a libretto by Marco Malvaldi, was commissioned by the Fondazione Teatro Coccia in Novara and received its world premiere in October 2024.

The work was presented together with Giacomo Puccini's Gianni Schicchi and functions as a prequel to Puccini's opera, focusing on events surrounding Buoso Donati before those depicted in Gianni Schicchi.

== Discography ==
Carrara's discography includes Faust in the Sky, Magnificat and other orchestral works, La Piccola Vedetta Lombarda, Ludus, Liber Mundi, A piano diary, Destinazione del sangue–Icone, War Silence, Voci da Hebron and The Devil's Bridge.

His recordings have been released by labels including Warner Classics, Brilliant Classics, Tactus, Arts, Incipit, Stradivarius, Hyperion and Naxos.

=== The Devil's Bridge ===
Naxos released The Devil's Bridge in 2024. The album includes Carrara's The Devil's Bridge, Eveline, Flower in the Desert and Four Emotions, performed by the FVG Orchestra conducted by Nir Kabaretti.

The album was reviewed by MusicWeb International, which discussed Carrara's approach to musical clarity, melodic writing and orchestral texture.

=== War Silence ===
War Silence is a piano concerto recorded by pianist Roberto Prosseda with the London Philharmonic Orchestra conducted by Nir Kabaretti and released by Hyperion.

The recording received an International Classical Music Award in 2026 in the category for concertos for solo instrument and orchestra.

=== Voci da Hebron ===
The Naxos recording of Voci da Hebron was released in 2025 and was conducted by Arthur Fagen with the Ensemble della Filarmonica del Teatro Comunale di Modena.

The opera was subsequently recognized by the Italian music magazine Amadeus in 2026.

== Critical opinions ==
Carrara's music has been discussed by composers, critics and music writers.

Giorgio Battistelli has praised Carrara's facility for composition (in Italian “facilità di scrittura” mean “knack for writing”), while Elena Formica described his music as direct while retaining a poetic quality. Claudio Strinati commented on the balance and delicacy of Carrara's harmonic writing. Rob Haskins and Flavio Emilio Scogna have also discussed characteristics of his musical writing.

Renzo Cresti discussed Carrara's Vivaldi. In memoriam in Musica Presente, focusing on the composer's treatment of Vivaldi's musical material and the relationship between historical references and contemporary composition.

Strinati's notes for the Tactus recording of La piccola vedetta lombarda discussed Carrara's compositional language and its relationship with earlier Italian musical traditions.

Flavio Emilio Scogna's notes for the same recording discussed Carrara's approach to making his compositional ideas clear and his relationship with the expressive characteristics of Italian musical tradition.

Rob Haskins, writing about Carrara's music in the booklet accompanying Liber Mundi, described a lyrical quality in his music and discussed the relationship between simplicity and expressive effect.

Sandro Cappelletto, in the booklet accompanying War Silence, discussed the relationship between Carrara's music, dramatic expression and contemporary social concerns.

Thea Derks reviewed Voci da Hebron in 2026 and discussed Carrara's use of contrasting musical styles and his treatment of emotions including love, fear, anger, incomprehension and the need for connection.

MusicWeb International's review of The Devil's Bridge discussed the clarity and apparent simplicity of Carrara's writing while noting the complexity underlying the music.

These assessments are presented as attributed critical opinions rather than as Wikipedia's own evaluation of Carrara.

== Other musical works ==
Carrara has also worked in television and popular music. He has been involved as an author and presenter of television programmes devoted to music, including Cose di musica.

In 2007, Carrara collaborated with singer Antonella Ruggiero on "Canzone tra le guerre". The song was performed at the Sanremo Music Festival and received the Lunezia Prize for Sanremo.

== Teaching ==
Carrara teaches composition at the Conservatorio Statale di Musica "Jacopo Tomadini" in Udine.

He has also taught Sound Design at the Link Campus University in Rome.

== Artistic direction ==
In addition to his work as a composer and teacher, Carrara has held artistic and managerial positions within Italian musical institutions.

In 2013 he served as artistic consultant to the superintendent of the Teatro Lirico di Trieste. He subsequently held artistic coordination and direction positions at other Italian musical institutions.

=== Fondazione Pergolesi Spontini ===
Carrara became artistic director of the Fondazione Pergolesi Spontini in Jesi in January 2019.

His appointment was subsequently renewed. The foundation continues to identify him as its artistic director.

=== Orchestra della Toscana ===
Carrara served as artistic coordinator of the Orchestra della Toscana from 2020 to 2021.

=== Teatro Verdi, Pisa ===
In April 2022, Carrara was appointed artistic director for opera and musical activities at the Teatro Verdi in Pisa.

During his tenure he was responsible for artistic programming relating to opera and musical activities at the theatre.

In December 2024, the Comune di Pisa announced Marco Tutino as the new artistic director for the following term, succeeding Carrara.

=== Composer-in-residence ===
Beginning in 2026, Carrara became composer-in-residence at the Teatro Carlo Felice in Genoa.

His work with the institution includes Transitus. Il cielo di Francesco, a work connected with celebrations marking the 800th anniversary of the death of Francis of Assisi. The work was presented at Teatro Carlo Felice in 2026.

== Other activities ==
Carrara has also been involved in youth organisations and cultural policy.

He served as National Youth Secretary of the Christian Association of Italian Workers and was involved in the Forum Nazionale dei Giovani, where he served as founder and first spokesperson.

He subsequently held leadership roles within ACLI and participated in cultural and youth-policy activities.

From 2014 to 2018, Carrara served as a regional councillor in Lazio and chaired the Regional Council's Culture Commission.

His activities outside composition have included cultural administration, artistic programming, youth organisations and public cultural policy.
