= Michael Glenn Williams =

American classical composer

Michael Glenn Williams (born October 23, 1957, in Lancaster, California) is an American composer, pianist and technologist.

== Musical Biography ==
Williams' earliest years were spent in New York City, beginning trumpet studies and composing at 8 years old. At age 12 he was programming DEC PDP 8 minicomputers. He attended CSU Northridge as a dual major in composition and piano performance where he studied with Aurelio de la Vega, Daniel Kessner, Frank Campo, and Francoise Regnat. He pioneered composing for FM synthesis combined with music concrete and acoustic instruments. He did graduate studies at the Eastman School of Music as a composition major, where he taught undergraduate electronic music, and worked with Samuel Adler, Robert Morris, Warren Benson, pianist Rebecca Penneys, and briefly with Joseph Schwantner and David Burge.

== Performance career ==
Williams is performing as pianist in The Chopin Project, with the jazz group 1 40 4 20, and as a studio pianist for film and television. As composer-in-residence at the Lake Como Festival 2010, he performed as recitalist for the International Piano Academy's Piano Master series. He premiered works written for him by Jeffery Cotton, Jeff Rona and other composers. He twice won the Northridge Chamber Music Award for performances of contemporary music. Williams also regularly releases performances on his Facebook page and YouTube channel "Michael's Piano Bar."

== Works ==
Williams composes for solo piano, chamber ensembles, choir and solo voice. Works for orchestra include Video Games Concerto, New West Overture, Rising Stars Overture, Oceanic Overture, American Prairie Sketches, Tarantella for piano and orchestra, composed for pianist Sean Chen; Princess Concerto for piano, narrator and orchestra; and The Gates of Hell a series of tone poems based on the Rodin sculptures. Williams catalogue for solo piano is extensive, with over twenty suites. Williams also composed for movies including King of the Hill, The Limey, Younger and Younger, The House of Yes, Wonderland, Wicker Park and Addams Family. He also composed cues and performed piano for the TV series Chicago Hope.

== Notable recordings ==
- For The Young Artist: Sean Chen Plays the Works of Michael Glenn Williams Navona Records, Sean Chen Pianist
- Fine Music Navona Records, Sean Chen Pianist
- Digital Animation Stradivarius Records, Enrico Pompili and Gabriele Baldocci pianists
- Lyricism: Songs Without Words, AIX Records, Roberto Prosseda, pianist
- Chroma, Capstone, Jeri-Mae Astolfi pianist
- Wet, Pocket Jazz Records, Michael Williams with 1 40 4 20, artists
- Jazz Trespassers, Pocket Jazz Records, 1 40 4 20 artists

== Technologist Biography ==
As a technologist, Williams first worked at System Development Corp (SDC), where he served as a BSD UNIX system programmer. He contributed to a variety of early UNIX / Internet projects including Pearl with Larry Wall, and Warp, an early computer game to run on CRTs based on Star Trek. As CTO at Sonus Corp, he authored the program SuperScore, one of the first computer editing and printing programs for music. He and Cleo Huggins developed the Adobe Sonata Font. Williams also authored articles for the IEICE, Music Technology, Electronic Music Educator, and Klavier.

Williams was an early employee at Sun Microsystems in the kernel team and the OBP (Open Boot) team, and implemented the first IOMMU kernel software for DVMA (Direct Virtual Memory Access). He served as the Chief Technical Architect for Fujitsu Software, HAL computers, and represented Fujitsu in the SPARC 10 architecture committee and the SPARC International certification organization. As a Senior IEEEE member, Williams served as the Vice Chair of the IEEE 802.21 working group, secretary for the IEEE 1275 Open Firmware working group, and member of the IEEE 1754 Open Microprocessor working group. He was awarded the title of Leading Scientist while working at Nokia. He represented Nokia at the Wi-Fi Alliance, IEEE (including 802.11i,s and 802.21) and 3GPP. Williams is co-author of IETF RFC 5412 "Lightweight Access Point Protocol", RFC 6520 "Transport Layer Security (TLS) and Datagram Transport Layer Security (DTLS) Heartbeat Extension" and Draft Mobile DTLS

Before the iPhone was released, Williams proposed "the computer phone" to the Nokia Technology Board. He led Nokia teams in negotiations with Google to create the first smartphone. Nokia withdrew from the negotiations. Google instead purchased several companies to create Android and the Pixel, while Apple went on to release the iPhone. Nokia did not create a smartphone, and went on to be purchased by Microsoft. Williams invented the "Interactive Broadcast Television" Williams holds patents in a variety of areas including Wi-Fi, 3GPP, network security, clustering, authentication and secure search.

== External links and references ==
- Michael Williams website
- Michael WIlliams YouTube channel
- SuperScore Announcement at CES https://web.archive.org/web/20060208022502/http://landley.net/history/mirror/8bits/ti99/time1987.htm
- Directions in Media Independent Handover, IEICE Transactions https://web.archive.org/web/20090224182248/http://ietfec.oxfordjournals.org/cgi/content/abstract/E88-A/7/1772
- The Chopin Project https://www.youtube.com/user/gwizvideo
- Announcement of IEEE 1754 Open Microprocessor Standard http://mail-index.netbsd.org/port-sparc/1994/03/19/0000.html
- IEEE Std 1275-1994: IEEE Standard for Boot Firmware (Initialization Configuration) Firmware: Core Requirements and Practices (ISBN 1-55937-426-8)
- Interactive Broadcast Television
- Digital Baton Patent
- Clustering Patent
- Patent for Prioritized Network Access for emergencies Cited by
- Patent for Parallel Scanning of network traffic by multiple entities
- Enterprise Agentic Platform: MESSAGING MIDDLEWARE DYNAMIC, CONTINUOUS SEARCH AND RESPONSE AGENT SYSTEM
- Patent for Integrated voice mail and email with searchable voice Cited by these patents

Specific
