= Nimrod Borenstein =

British- French- Israeli composer

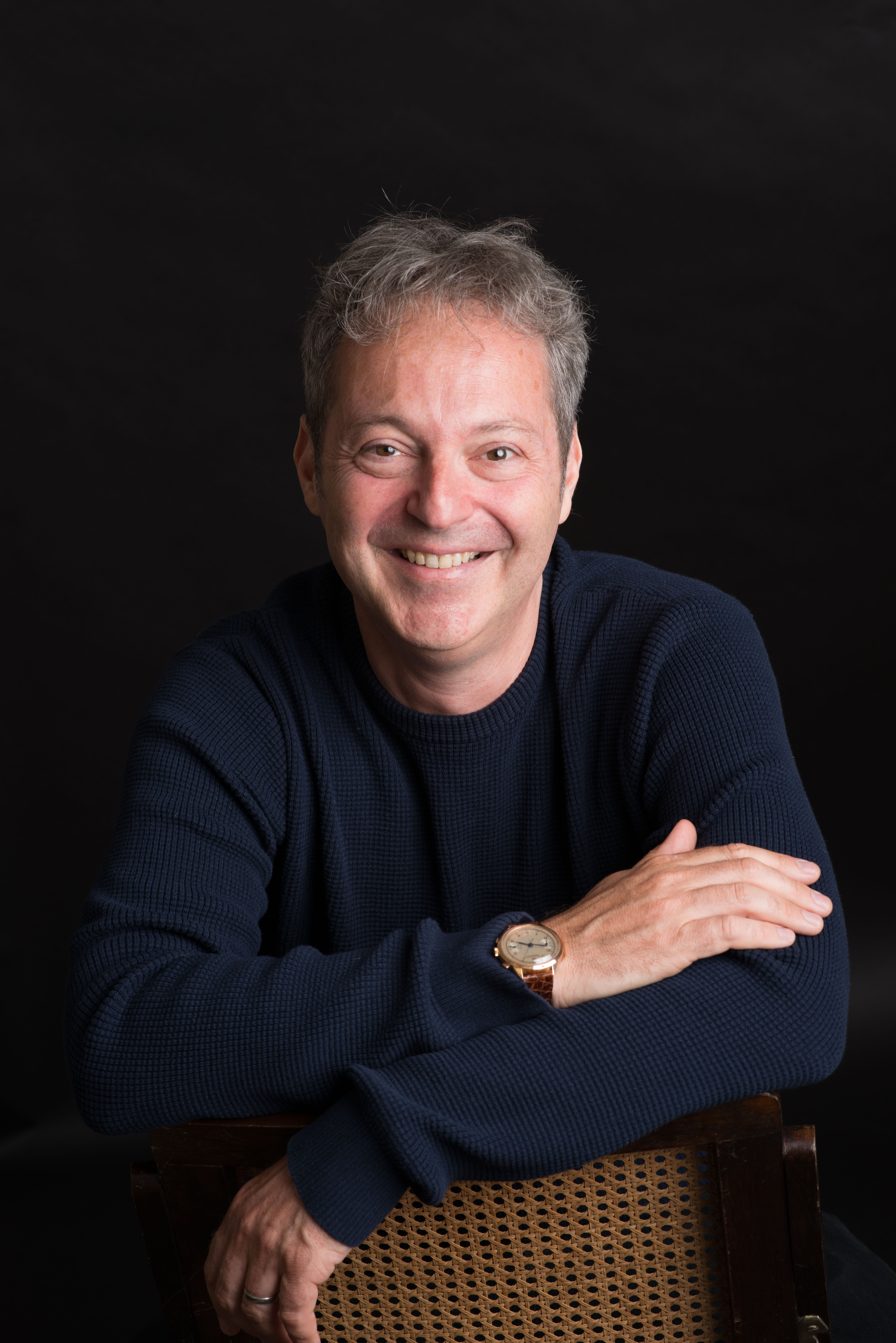
Nimrod Borenstein

Nimrod Borenstein (Hebrew: נמרוד בורנשטיין; born 1969) is a British-French-Israeli composer and conductor whose music is widely performed throughout Europe, the US, Canada, Australia, and Japan. His works are becoming part of the repertoire of many ensembles and orchestras.

== Education ==
Born in Tel Aviv, Israel, Borenstein grew up in Paris, France, where he started his musical education at the age of 3. In 1984, he became a Laureat of the Cziffra Foundation and moved to London, England, in 1986 to pursue his studies as a violinist with Itzhak Rashkovsky at the Royal College of Music. He was then awarded the highest scholarship from the Leverhulme Trust to study composition with Paul Patterson at the Royal Academy. As of 2014, he is an Associate of the Academy and listed amongst the alumni. He lives in London with his wife, the Italian writer Elli Stern.

== Composer ==
Vladimir Ashkenazy has been a supporter of Borenstein's music for many years. In 2013 Ashkenazy conducted the Philharmonia Orchestra for a performance of The Big Bang and Creation of the Universe. Later that year he conducted the Philharmonia Orchestra at the Royal Festival Hall in the world premiere of If you will it, it is no dream.

The past few years have seen Nimrod Borenstein's compositions premiered and performed at the Royal Opera House and the Royal Festival Hall in London, the Salle Gaveau in Paris, Carnegie Hall in New York, and in Milan, where Nayden Todorov conducted the Italian premiere of The Big Bang and the Creation of the Universe, Op. 52. His works have also featured in numerous music festivals across Europe such as It's All About Piano in London, the Burgos International Music Festival and Belgrade Cello Fest.

Borenstein's Shell Adagio (published by Boosey & Hawkes) has been played by 16 different orchestras, including a concert at Carnegie Hall. In 2014 his Violin concerto was premiered by Dmitry Sitkovetsky and the Oxford Philomusica conducted by Marios Papadopoulos at the Sheldonian Theatre in Oxford.

A particular highlight of the 2014/15 season was the world premiere at the Royal Opera House of Suspended, a work written for Gandini Juggling's 4 x 4: Ephemeral Architectures show. A huge international success, Suspended has had to date more than 200 performances (from the Edinburgh International Festival to the Taipei Arts Festival etc.).

Nimrod Borenstein is currently engaged in a multi-year ‘24 Piano Etudes’ project - the first 12 to be recorded and released by Naxos in 2022.

Nimrod Borenstein's substantial catalogue currently numbers over ninety works including orchestral and chamber music as well as vocal and solo instrumental pieces.

== Discography ==
- Nimrod Borenstein: Legends of Cyprus opus 102, Antonin Dvořak: Othello Overture B.174, Franz Schubert: Rosamunde Princess of Cyprus Incidental music D797, Samuel Coleridge-Taylor: Othello Suite opus 79. The Cyprus Symphony Orchestra, Nimrod Borenstein, conductor. Somm (2026)
- Nimrod Borenstein: Concerto for Violin and Orchestra opus 60, The Big Bang and Creation of the Universe opus 52, If you will it, it is no dream opus 58. The Oxford Philharmonic Orchestra, Vladimir Ashkenazy, Irmina Trynkos. Chandos (2017)
- Nimrod Borenstein: Mandolin concerto opus 97, Oboe concerto opus 99, Shakespeare Songs opus 101. The English Chamber Orchestra, Nimrod Borenstein, conductor. Soloists Alon Sariel (mandolin), Sanja Romic (oboe), Sarah Fox (soprano). Somm (2026)
- Nimrod Borenstein: Capriccio, for harp solo opus 107. Anne-Sophie Bertrand, harp. Pentatone (2026).
- Nimrod Borenstein: Concerto for Piano and Orchestra opus 91, Shirim op. 94 (for piano solo), Light and Darkness opus 80 (for piano quintet). The Royal Philharmonic Orchestra, Nimrod Borenstein (conductor), Clelia Iruzun (piano), I Musicanti. Somm (2023)
- Nimrod Borenstein: Solo piano music including Études op. 66, Études op. 86, Reminiscences of childhood op. 54, Water droplets in Venice op. 75 No. 2, Lullaby op. 81a. Tra Nguyen, piano. Grand Piano Naxos (2023)
- Nimrod Borenstein: Quasi una cadenza opus 26 for violin solo. Nuné Melik. Bourget Music (2022)
- Nimrod Borenstein: Kaddish opus 78 and Quasi una cadenza opus 26 for violin solo. Olga Dubossarskaya Kaler. Centaur Records (2022)
- Nimrod Borenstein: Lullaby opus 81c for violin, saxophone and piano. Kugoni Trio. Etcetera Records (2021)
- Nimrod Borenstein: Cieli d’Italia opus 88. Quartetto di Cremona. Avie Records (2020)
- Nimrod Borenstein: Reminiscences of childhood opus 54. Nadav Hertzka, piano. Skarbo (2019)
- Nimrod Borenstein: Concerto for piano, trumpet and string orchestra opus 74. The English Symphony Orchestra conducted by Kenneth Woods, Simon Desbruslais (trumpet), Clare Hammond (piano). Signum Classics (2017)
- Nimrod Borenstein: Suspended opus 69. das freie orchester Berlin, Laércio Diniz. Solaire Records (2015)
- Nimrod Borenstein: Quasi una cadenza opus 26. Thomas Gould, violin. Champs Hill Records
- Nimrod Borenstein: Duo concertant opus 73. Sanja Romic, oboe & Fionnuala Moynihan, piano. HedoneRecords (2017)
- Nimrod Borenstein: Perpetua opus 29 for flute, viola & harp. Debussy Trio. Klavier Records (2010)
- Nimrod Borenstein: Shell Adagio opus 17 for string orchestra. Florida All-State Middle School Orchestra, James Mick conductor. Mark Records (2017)

== Publishers ==
Nimrod Borenstein publishers include:

- Donemus
- Boosey & Hawkes
- Alain Van Kerckhoven Éditeur
