= Cameron Carpenter =

American musician (born 1981)

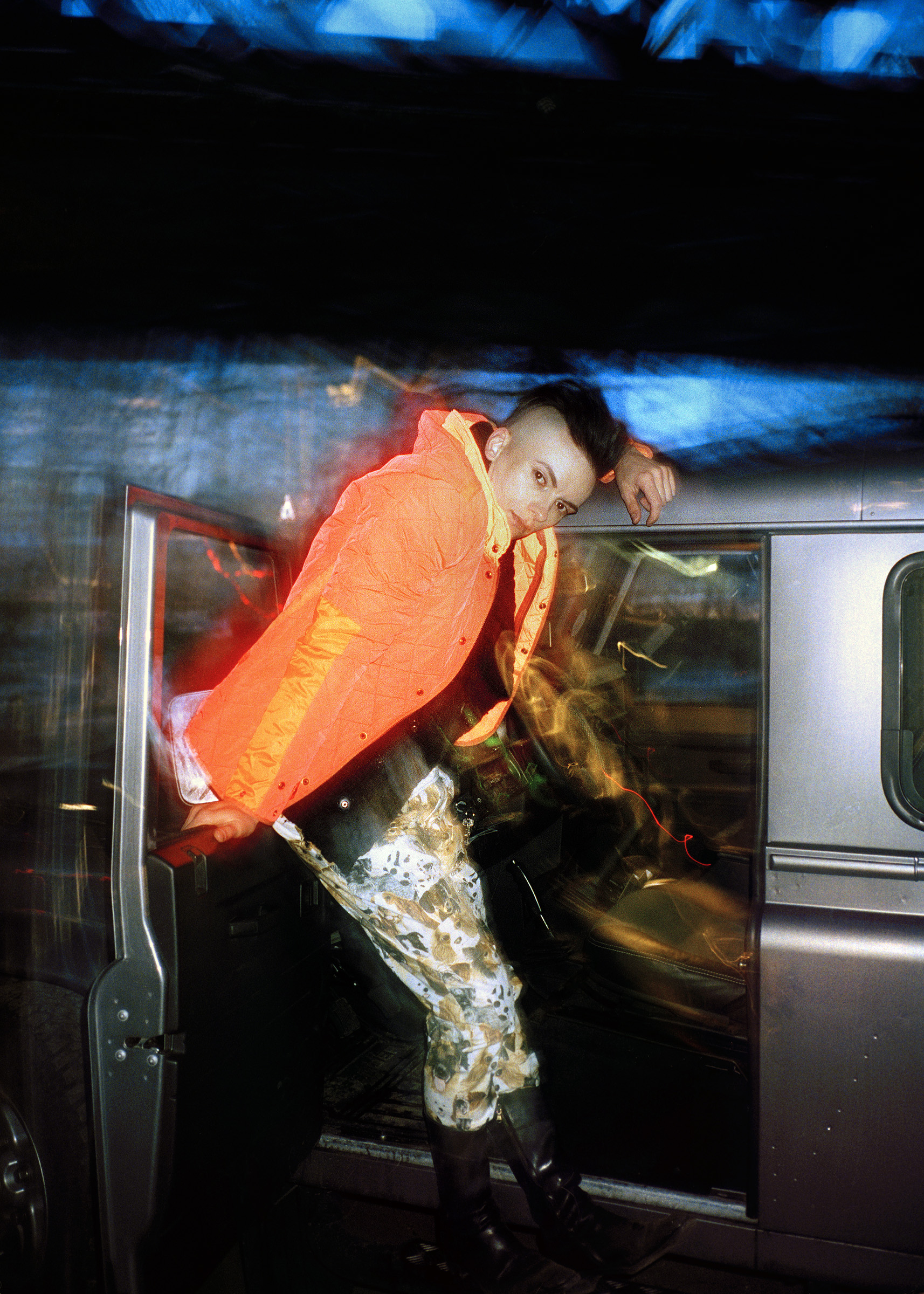
- Cameron Carpenter photographed by Oliver Mark, Berlin 2012

Background information
- Born: Taylor Cameron Carpenter; April 18, 1981 (age 45)
- Occupation: Organist
- Instrument: Organ
- Labels: Sony Classical; Telarc; SeeMusicDVD
- Website: cameroncarpenter.com

Taylor Cameron Carpenter (born April 18, 1981) is an American organist and composer. In 2009, he became the first organist ever to be nominated for a Grammy Award for his solo album, Revolutionary.

== Biography ==
Taylor Cameron Carpenter was born in the state of Pennsylvania, United States.

He attended high school at the University of North Carolina School of the Arts, and has bachelor's and master's degrees from the Juilliard School in New York, having studied with Gerre Hancock, John Weaver, and Paul Jacobs. Though he is not religious, Carpenter was from 2008 to 2009 the artist-in-residence at Middle Collegiate Church in New York's East Village, where he played a four-manual electronic organ that he designed for the broad-ranging music of that church. Carpenter ended his residency in July 2009.

== Recordings ==
An "early" recording, made in 2005 and financed by the Allen Organ Company, was titled notes from the underground. This recording was a highly unusual project for Allen, as Carpenter was given near-complete artistic control of the album, selection of the program, and even oversight of graphic design (featuring location shots of Carpenter at famous New York City graffiti sites). This album was not reissued by Allen and is now a rarity.

His first commercial album was a 2006 CD/DVD, Pictures at an Exhibition, on SeeMusicDVD. It includes his arrangement of the programmatic piano work by Modest Mussorgsky, and his own improvisatory "New York City Sessions". Visuals for the Mussorgsky were created by Marshall Yaeger and his Kaleidoplex. The recording was made at Trinity Church, New York.

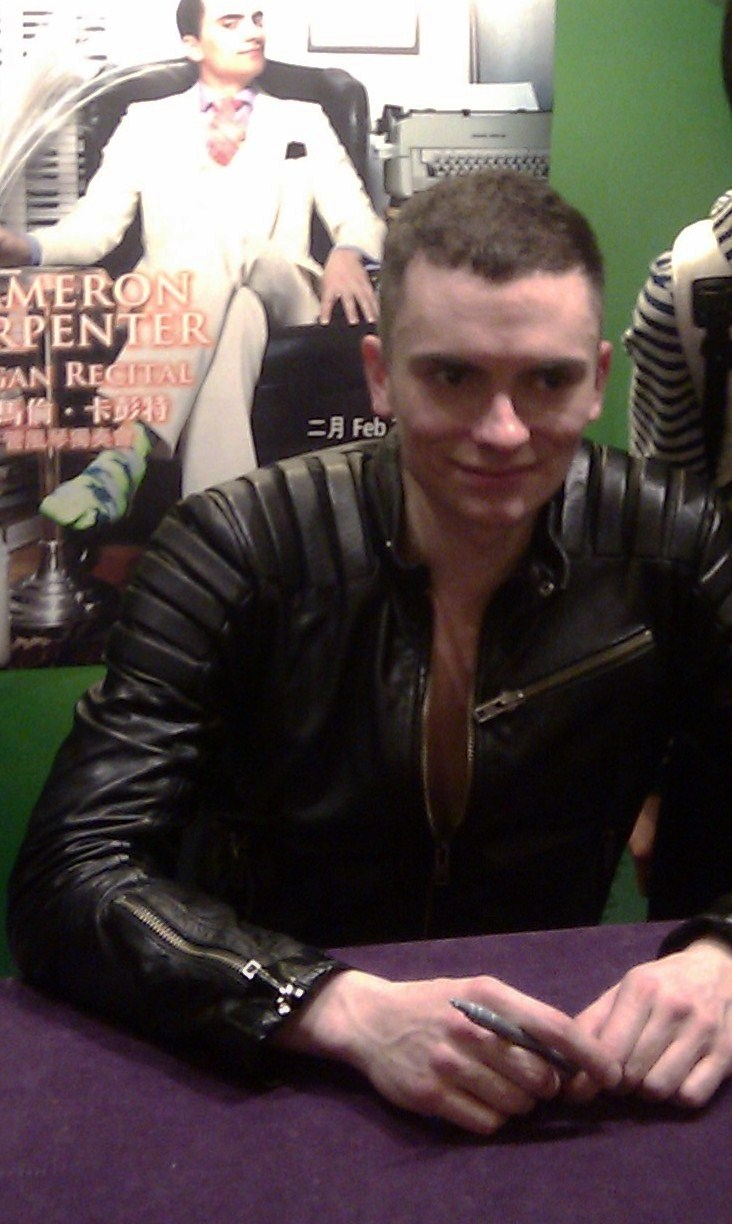
Cameron Carpenter in Hong Kong in 2011

In early 2008, the Telarc record label signed Carpenter to an exclusive five-album recording contract. His Telarc debut album, Revolutionary, was recorded as a CD and DVD at Trinity Church Wall Street in New York City and released September 23, 2008. The title comes from Carpenter's transcription of Chopin's "Revolutionary Etude". The album made Carpenter the first organist ever to receive a Grammy nomination in the category 'Best Solo Instrumental Performance' (without orchestra) for a solo album.

On June 1, 2010, Telarc issued in the U.S. a two-disc set with a CD carrying a J.S. Bach recital that had been recorded live at a recital he played in the Church of St. Mary the Virgin in New York City.

On August 26, 2014, Sony issued the DVD If You Could Read My Mind, containing performances and commentary by Carpenter recorded on his electronic touring organ.

== Work ==
Carpenter has been both criticized by some and praised by others for his unorthodox interpretations of the standard organ repertoire. Registrations rarely follow those suggested by the composer, and Carpenter often takes dramatic liberties in articulation. Carpenter is also noted for his advocacy of the digital organ, particularly development of a touring electronic organ, citing factors such as the obstacles the pipe organ imposes on the ability of a traveling performer to enjoy an ongoing relationship with a single instrument in the same manner as many other instrumentalists. Despite this, he frequently performs on pipe organs, often garnering major exposure for the instrument.

He designed and commissioned the International Touring Organ (ITO), Opus 8 of the Marshall and Ogletree company, a one-of-a-kind, customized, "full-scale portable organ sonically tailorable to any acoustic environment", which took ten years and cost $2 million to build. Since its premiere in March 2014, he no longer has to learn a new instrument for every performance which he characterized as maddening, and he now tours worldwide to venues that have never had an organ. The story of the ITO is the subject of the 2015 documentary "The Sound of My Life".

In 2020, while recovering from COVID-19 in Berlin, Germany, Carpenter could not oversee the moving and ongoing storage of the ITO. On account of this, the organ and its components suffered irreparable damage. “It taught me a lot about loss,” Carpenter said. “And it changed my feelings about music itself. It disrupted my conviction that I want to be a musician.”

== Personal life ==
Carpenter has been identified as bisexual. In a New York Times interview, it was reported, "Mr. Carpenter... describes his sexuality as 'radically inclusive'".
