= Franco Oppo =

Italian composer and scholar

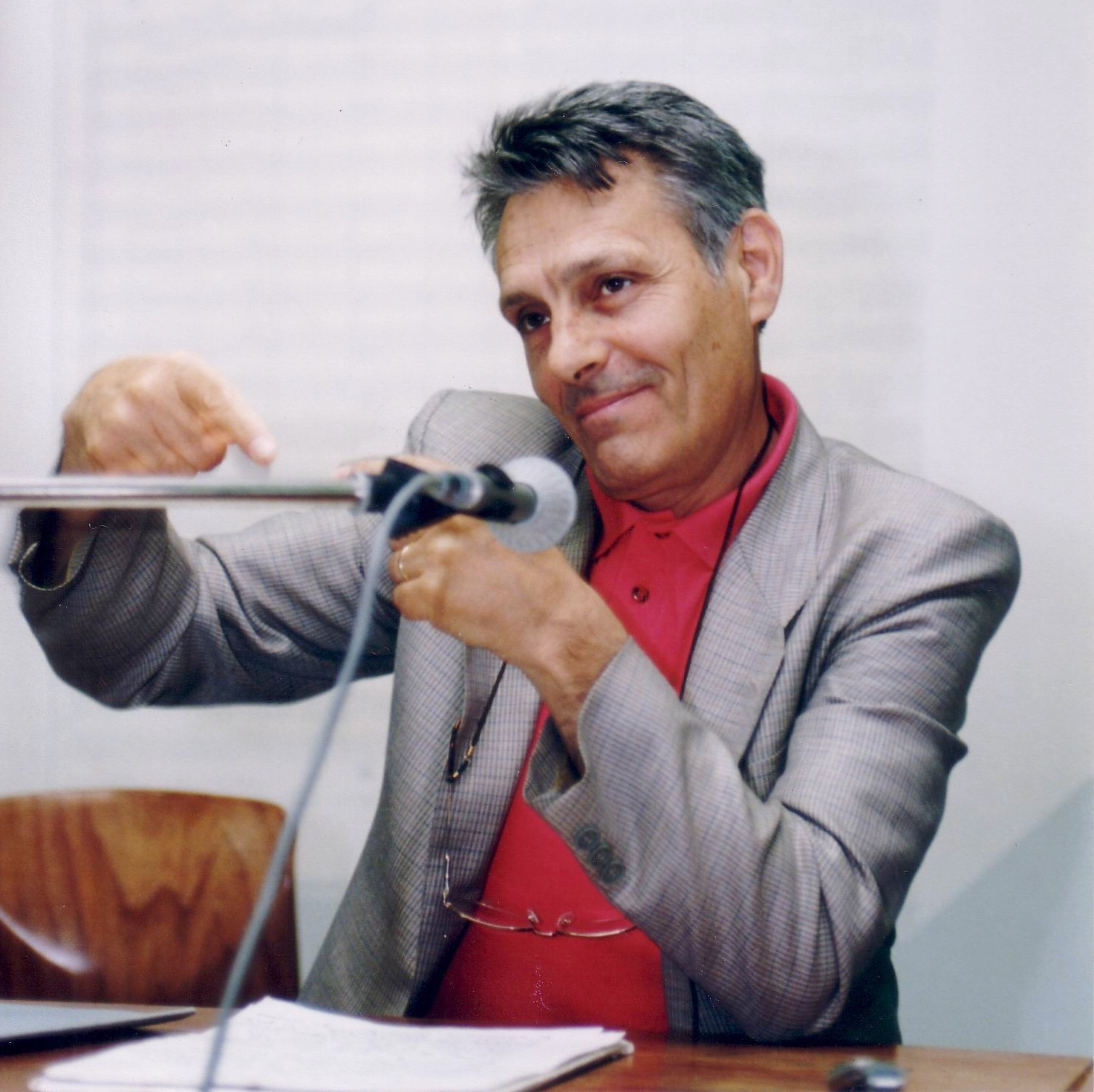
- Born: 2 October 1935; Nuoro, Italy
- Died: 14 January 2016 (aged 80); Cagliari, Italy

Franco Oppo (2 October 1935 – 14 January 2016) was an Italian composer and scholar.

Born in Nuoro, Oppo studied at the Conservatory of Cagliari, graduating in piano (1958), choral music and choral conducting (1960), and composition (1961). Since 1965 he won several international composition competitions. He was professor of composition and experimental composition at the Conservatory of Cagliari and professor of music theory at the Cagliari University.

Oppo published various studies and essays, particularly about music semiology and ethnic music. His studies mainly focused on aleatoric music and on testing new types of notation.
