= Roberto Prosseda =

Italian musician

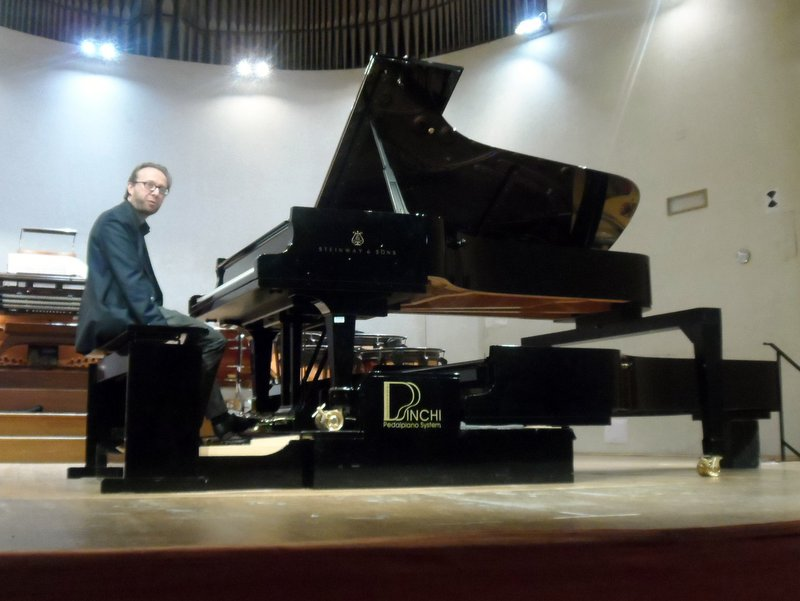
Roberto Prosseda at a pedal piano, Florence, November 2013

Roberto Prosseda (born 1975) is an Italian classical pianist.

Prosseda began composing for the piano at the age of four, and took his first private piano lessons at six. In 1985, he entered the Conservatorio Ottorino Respighi in Latina, where he studied piano with Anna Maria Martinelli, graduating in 1994. He went on to study with Alexander Lonquich, Boris Petrushansky and Franco Scala at the Accademia Pianistica "Incontri col Maestro" in Imola, and with Dmitri Bashkirov, Leon Fleisher, William Grant Naboré, Charles Rosen, Karl Ulrich Schnabel, Fou Ts'ong at the International Piano Foundation in Cadenabbia (Lake Como, Italy). Prosseda has won major prizes in several piano competitions, including the Umberto Micheli competition in Milan, the Franz Schubert competition in Dortmund, the Alessandro Casagrande competition in Terni, and the Mozart competition in Salzburg. Prosseda completed his PhD in Italian Literature from La Sapienza University in Rome. Prosseda and his wife, concert pianist Alessandra Ammara, perform as a piano duo.

Prosseda is particularly noted for his performances of newly discovered works by Felix Mendelssohn. He has recorded a nine-CD series for Decca of the piano works of Mendelssohn, including a Mendelssohn Discoveries album of formerly unknown works. Prosseda discovered a manuscript of Mendelssohn's uncompleted third piano concerto in the Bodleian Library, and asked Marcello Bufalini to complete the score. Prosseda subsequently performed the reconstruction publicly and recorded it commercially. Prosseda has prepared critical editions of rare piano works by Mendelssohn, including 6 Fugues (1821–26), 4 Sonatas (1820), and Fantasia for piano four hands (1824). Prosseda is founder and president of the Associazione Mendelssohn, which promotes the music and the heritage of Felix Mendelssohn.

Prosseda dedicated the early part of his career to the discovery of piano works by several neglected Italian composers, such as Antonio Salieri, Gioachino Rossini and Roffredo Caetani. He published the first edition of Salieri's Sonata in C major in 2004 for Boccaccini & Spada.

In September 2011, Prosseda gave his first public performance on the piano-pédalier (pedal piano), the modern première of Charles Gounod's concerto for piano-pédalier and orchestra in E flat major (1889), with the Orchestra Filarmonica Toscanini conducted by Jan Latham Koenig. Subsequently, contemporary composers have written piano pedal pieces for Prosseda, including Cristian Carrara, Ennio and Andrea Morricone, Giuseppe Lupis, Alessandro Solbiati and Michael Glenn Williams. Prosseda has commercially recorded four works by Charles Gounod for piano-pédalier and orchestra (Concerto, Suite Concertante, Fantaisie sur l'Hymne Russe and Danse Roumaine) for Hyperion. In June 2012, Prosseda made his debut recital on the piano-pédalier at the Teatro Olimpico in Vicenza.

== Career ==
Prosseda is a host on the Italian National Radio (RAI), Radiotre, and a contributor to the "Lezioni di Musica" series on RAI. He is also the author of "Lezioni di Musica - il Pianoforte", a listening guide to piano repertoire, published in Italian by Edizioni Curci in 2013. He co-produced three documentaries: "Mendelssohn Unknown", "Fryderyk Chopin", and "Liszt: The Years of Pilgrimage".

Prosseda is also a co-founder and artistic coordinator of "Donatori di Musica", a network of musicians and doctors who organise concert series in Italian hospitals.

== Experiments with technology ==
Since 2012, Prosseda has also given lecture-concerts with the robot pianist TeoTronico, as educational or family concerts, to demonstrate differences between a literal production of music and human interpretation. On 23 August 2012 at the Philharmonie in Berlin, he appeared as a ghost pianist, playing a Clavinova digital piano from backstage, connected in real time via Midi with TeoTronico. The robot, onstage, mirrored Prosseda's performance of Chopin's Polacca Brillante op. 22, reproducing it on a normal grand piano with the Berlin Symphony Orchestra. This was the first experiment of a live teleconcert with a ghost pianist. He repeated the experiment in Palermo in November 2012, performing Mozart's concerto K. 488 backstage, with TeoTronico on stage with the Orchestra Sinfonica Siciliana.

== Honours and awards ==
- Supersonic Award by Pizzicato (March 2013) for Prosseda's Decca CD "Piano con Fuoco"
- Diapason d'Or of the Month (November 2009) awarded for the Mendelssohn Discoveries Decca CD.
- Premio Petrassi per la Musica, 2010. Awarded by Ennio Morricone to Roberto Prosseda at Parco della Musica, Roma, 27 September 2010.
- Premio Silvestro Sasso 2002 for the best University Dissertation about Music.
- Amadeus Award as "Miglior CD del Mese", awarded for Mendelssohn Discoveries, May 2005.

== Recordings ==
- CD Hyperion CDA68458 (2025) WAR SILENCE - Rare Italian Piano Concertos
- CD Challenge Classics (2024) Beethoven: 3 Sonatas op. 2
- CD Decca (2024) Mozart: Late Piano Works
- CD Decca (2021) Ennio Morricone: Piano Music
- CD Decca (2020) Mendelssohn 3 Violin Sonatas, with Shlomo Mintz
- CD Decca (2019) Mendelssohn Concertos for two pianos
- CD Decca (2019) Mendelssohn Concerto for violin, piano and orchestra (versione con fiati e timpani). Con Shlomo Mintz. Flanders Symphony Orchestra, diretta da Jan Latham Koenig
- CD Decca (2018) Mendelssohn Piano Concertos n. 1 - 2, Rondo Brillante, con Residentie Orkest e Jan WIllem de Vriend
- CD Decca (2018) Gounod Piano Works
- CD Decca (2019) Mozart, Sonate per pianoforte, n. 13-18
- CD Decca (2017) Mozart, Sonate per pianoforte, n.7-12
- CD Decca (2016) Mozart, Sonate per pianoforte n. 1-6
- CD Decca (2015) Mendelssohn, Opere complete per pianoforte a 4 mani e per 2 pianoforti - Prosseda/Ammara
- CD Decca (2016) Mozart, Mozart for babies
- CD Decca (2015) Mendelssohn, Opere complete per pianoforte a 4 mani e per 2 pianoforti - Prosseda/Ammara
- CD Decca 481 1010 (3 CDs, 2014) Felix Mendelssohn: Da Capo Al Fine (Complete Variations, Preludes and Fugues, Charakterstücke, Etudes, Klavierstücke, with 29 World Premiere Recordings)
- DVD "Pedal Piano Recital", Continuo Records, 2014 (Original Works for Pedal Piano by Schumann, Boëly, Alkan and Gounod)
- CD Hyperion CDA67975 (2013) The Romantic Piano Concerto, vol.62 - Charles Gounod: The complete works for pedal piano and orchestra
- CD Decca 476 5190 (2012) Felix Mendelssohn: Early Chamber Works (Quartetti per pf. e archi)
- CD Decca 476 5118 (2 CD, 2012) Felix Mendelssohn: Piano con Fuoco (4 Sonatas, 5 Fantasias, 5 Capricci)
- CD Decca 476 4545 (2011) Franz Liszt: Années de Pèlerinage, Italie.
- CD Decca 476 3962 (2010) Robert Schumann: "Fantasia" (Fantasia op. 17, Arabesque op. 18, Kinderszenen op. 15, Waldszenen op. 82)
- CD Decca 478 1525 (2009) Mendelssohn Discoveries
- CD Decca 476 6796 (2 CD, 2008) Felix Mendelssohn: 56 Lieder ohne Worte – First complete performance (2008)
- CD Decca 476 6165 (2007) «Chopin»
- CD Decca 476 5277 (2006) «Mendelssohn Rarities». Felix Mendelssohn: 4 Early Piano Sonatas, World Premiere Recording
- DVD Domovideo (2006) “Roberto Prosseda” Piano Recital (Mozart, Schubert, Chopin)
- CD Decca 476 3038 (2005) «Mendelssohn Discoveries». Felix Mendelssohn: 13 Piano Works, World Premiere Recordings
- CD Velut Luna 112 (2005) “Piano Vibratili”. Italian Contemporary Piano Works
- CD Naxos 8.557676 (2003) Luigi Dallapiccola: Complete Works for Violin and Piano, and for Piano
- CD Fonè 2049 (2000) Goffredo Petrassi: Complete Piano Works
