= Parmalee (disambiguation) =

Parmalee is an American country music band.

Parmalee may also refer to:

- Bernie Parmalee (born 1967)
- Paul Parmalee (1926-2006)
- Henry S. Parmalee, American piano maker from New Haven, Connecticut
- Parmalee Transfer Company

== See also ==
- Parmelee (disambiguation)
- Parmele, North Carolina
- Parmal, medieval Indian king, contemporary of Prithviraj Chauhan
