= Parmelee =

Parmelee may refer to:

- Parmelee (surname)
- Parmelee, South Dakota
- Parmelee System, a taxi company
- Parmelee Building, in Los Angeles, California

== See also ==
- Parmalee (disambiguation)
- Parmelee-Dohrmann, Los Angeles china, crystal and silver store
