= Frederick Mathushek =

German piano maker

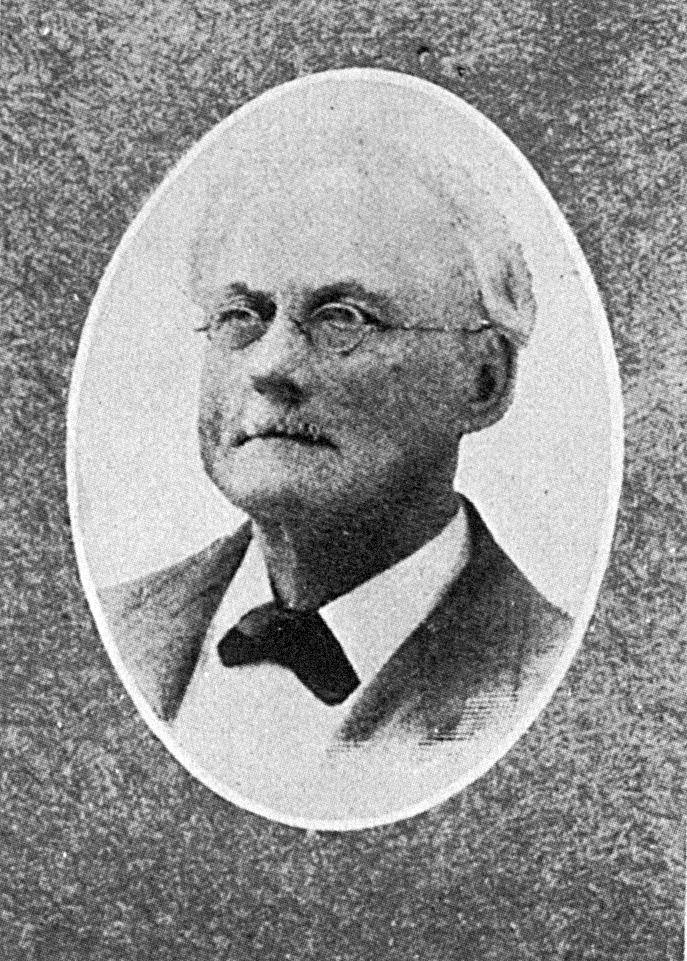
Frederick Mathushek

Frederick Mathushek (June 9, 1814 – November 9, 1891) was a piano maker who worked in Worms, Germany, and in New York City and New Haven, Connecticut, during the second half of the nineteenth century. His name was used by several different piano manufacturers through the 1950s, and was filed independently as a trademark for musical instruments in 2005 and 2008.

== Worms ==
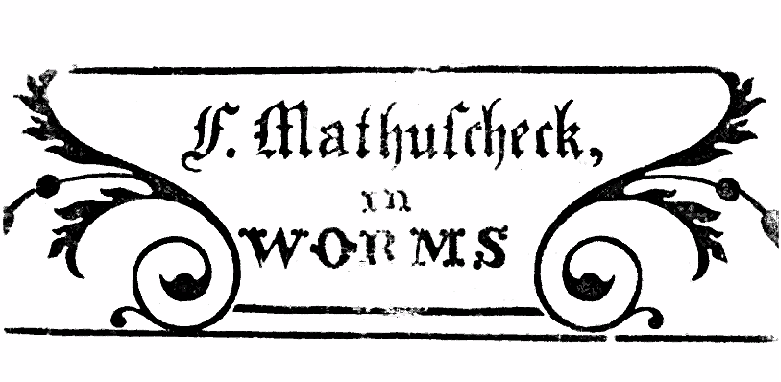

Frederick Mathushek was born in Mannheim, Baden, June 9, 1814. He apprenticed with a pianomaker until the age of 17, when he travelled to visit piano making facilities in Germany, Austria, Russia, and Paris. He established his own workshop in Worms, where he built pianos influenced by those he had seen in Jean-Henri Pape's factory.

== New York, 1850s ==
Mathushek's 1851 patent

In 1849 Mathushek emigrated to New York and worked for John B. Dunham, who was one of the first piano manufacturers to introduce overstringing in America several years earlier. Alfred Dolge wrote that Mathushek perfected a simplified press for applying felt covering to piano hammers in 1850, and in 1851 he patented a method for overstringing in cast iron frame square pianos to allow a greater number of strings with larger diameters. The arrangement was intended to improve tone and stability, and it became known as the sweep scale because it distributed the strings much farther apart on the sounding board than more conventional methods of stringing.

Mathushek started his own workshop in New York in 1852, and that year listed his address at 118 East 21st street. By 1856 he was listed at 188 Mercer and 72 Prince, and at 252 Fourth street from 1858 through 1861.

Piano historians Daniel Spillane and Dolge wrote that by 1857 Mathushek had been engaged to bring some of Spencer B. Driggs' designs to practical form. Driggs had moved to New York from Detroit, Michigan, in 1856 after patenting his linguine [sic] repeating attachment, and campaigned to improve the piano through a series of patents he concentrated around the construction of violins. The identifying feature was the use of two un-barred sounding boards, one of which was meant to form the bottom of the instrument instead of the usual heavy wooden base or frame, and they were intended to be bent into arches to increase their stiffness and coupled using a sound post.

By late 1859, Mathushek was associated with lawyer Wellington Wells and coassigned him patents for a repetition action and grand pianos. These overstrung pianos had closely spaced strings arranged at sharp angles to the keyboard following the same principles as the bichord parlor grands introduced in America by Chickering and Sons in the early 1850s (now known as cocked hats).

== Mathushek & Kühner ==
In 1863 Mathushek was a member of Mathushek & Kühner, a copartnership with Leopold Kuhner, and they were awarded a bronze medal for a "piano of new and elegant shape" at the American Institute Fair that year. The firm was listed at 34 Second Avenue in 1863 and 1864 and 10 Second Avenue by 1866.

== Mathushek Piano Manufacturing Company ==
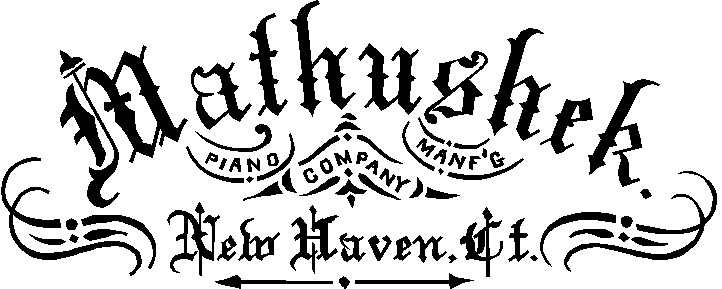

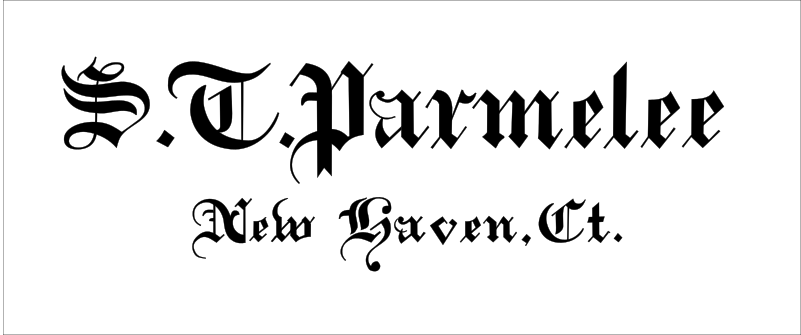

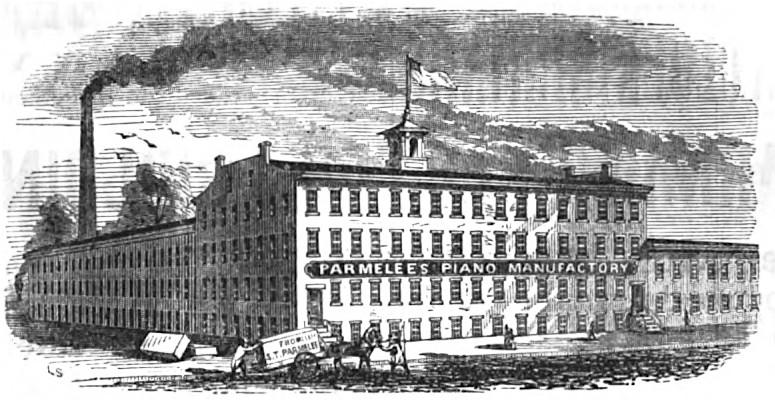
Parmelee's Piano Manufactory, 1865

In 1866 Morris Steinert, who had a music store in New Haven, Connecticut and was a stocking agent for Mathushek & Kuhner, convinced Mathushek to move from New York to superintend a piano manufacturing company newly organized as the Mathushek Piano Manufacturing Company, on Orange Street, between Chapel and Crown street. Steinert and his co-investors soon sold their interest in the company at a loss. In his 1902 biography, Steinert blamed their lack of success on inexperience in manufacturing and advertisement, as well as "certain difficulties regarding [their] Superintentent"; according to an 1882 account written by Mathushek's grandson, ownership of the company passed to Henry S. Parmelee, who he wrote had been involved from the start but "managed, by certain means...to obtain control of all the stock except that belonging to...Mathushek".

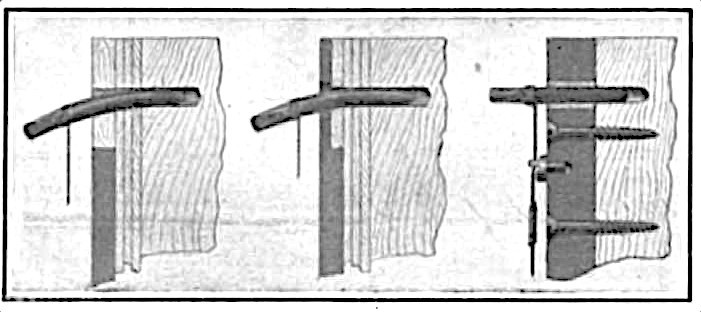
Mathushek Co.'s tuning pin bushings compared to exaggerated renderings of two other systems

Henry S. Parmelee (c. 1846–1902) had been the junior partner in Parmelee & Son, a short-lived piano manufacturing company formed after a destructive fire at the Parmelee Piano Company's factory at 9 Howard Street in 1865, and listed only in the 1866 New Haven Directory. His father Spencer (c. 1805–1875) was a wealthy New Haven businessman who had previously been president of the Driggs Piano Co. in New York and had patented tuning pin bushings—individual tubular wooden plugs pressed into a sockets in the cast frame to hold the tuning pins instead of a single structural wooden wrest plank bolted to the frame—and iron frame squares almost entirely lacking wood structural components in 1862 and 1865. His name was applied to pianos built by the Parmelee Piano Co., though he did not appear to have been in charge of the firm.

Mathushek Piano Co. was initially listed at 196 Chapel street but by 1869 was listed at 106 Park street, formerly of Parmelee & Sons, and with Spencer T. Parmelee as president and William L. Everitt, treasurer.

Alfred Dolge, who had worked at the factory between 1867 and 1869, wrote the newly formed company conducted a series of experiments in sounding board construction, and reported their preference for the now conventional construction, but they also introduced radical string arrangements in square pianos based on Mathushek's designs. Their 4'10" long (147 cm) Colibri had earned the highest awards for any piano at the 1867 American Institute fair, and both it and their 6'10" inch long (208 cm) Orchestral used the entire sounding board instead of only the right hand side as in conventional square pianos. This combination, patented by Mathushek, of straight bridges –the linear bridge – and the distribution of strings across the sounding board and iron frame – the equalizing scale was claimed to produce "a volume and beauty of tone found elsewhere only in concert grands".

By 1871 the company offered "harp form" parlor grands as well as concert grands, and within ten years introduced a 5'9" (175 cm)-long square, and an upright incorporating Parmelee's tuning pin bushings for the purpose of holding tune better than more conventional designs.

Parmelee replaced Everitt as treasurer around 1871 and became president following his father's death in 1875.

In 1880 the Mathushek Piano Mfg. Co. established their own New York warerooms at 23 East 14th street, and advertised having more than 5,000 in use. By 1897 their factory was located at Washington avenue, at the corner of Brown in West Haven, and they advertised having sold more than 30,000 pianos.

The Parmelee Piano Works where Mathushek Piano Manufacturing Company's instruments were made had one of the first non-experimental fire sprinklers, installed by M. Seward & Son, of New Haven based on the design patented by Parmelee in 1874. Parmelee licensed the patent and improvements on a royalty basis by 1879 to the Providence Steam and Gas Pipe. Parmelee patented seven improvements for sprinklers between 1874 and 1882, and also received patents for sounding board construction in 1884 and upright piano cases in 1885, with the central part of the case angled inwards to form a music rest.

Parmelee died in 1902, but the company continued manufacturing at the same address.

== New York, 1870s ==
According to the account in the 1882 Music and Drama article, by 1870 Mathushek returned to New York and was only nominally associated with the Mathushek Piano Manufacturing Company; Dolge dated it one year later when he was listed there in unassigned patents he received for a system compensating wires arranged to counteract the bending strain of the main strings, and vertically bent key levers for upright pianos.

A later account describes Mathushek manufacturing his own pianos through 1873 as a member of Mathushek & Co., with warerooms on 9th Street near Broadway and a factory at 145th street and Brook Avenue in partnership with his daughter Hermine, who as early as 1869 was listed as a member of Barlow & Mathushek, with W. S. Barlow selling pianos at 694 Broadway.

In 1874 Mathushek was associated with David H. Dunham of Dunham & Sons, with whom he patented improvements in iron frames and wrestplank bridges, and in 1877 the Mendelssohn Piano Company advertised their latest trichord squares used "Mathushek's new Duplex Overstrung Scale, the greatest improvement in the history of Piano making," and claimed to have received unanimous recommendation for the highest awards at the Centennial Exhibition in 1876, where the Mathushek Piano Manufacturing Co. had also exhibited pianos.

== Mathushek & Son ==
In 1879 Mathushek and his son, Hugo Mathushek, Jr., patented a new arrangement of bridge agraffes combined with a development of the front terminations introduced in the 1860 patent. The bridge arrangement, styled the equilibre system, involved deflecting the strings alternately toward and away from the soundboard to two different levels of hitchpins—a difference claimed to be as much as 15 degrees in one advertisement—in order to minimize the downward strain applied to the sounding board (which is usually less than 2 degrees with conventional pinned bridges).

The following year, the Mathushek Piano Mfg. Co. cautioned the public against "bogus instruments represented as genuine Mathushek Pianos, at auction sales and elsewhere."

In 1881 "the only genuine Mathushek with the equilibre system" was advertised having been "invented and manufactured by the original Mathusheks in New York", and the public was informed that "Mathushek, New York" should be cast in the iron frame and warned against pianos manufactured in West Haven, Connecticut, under the same name.

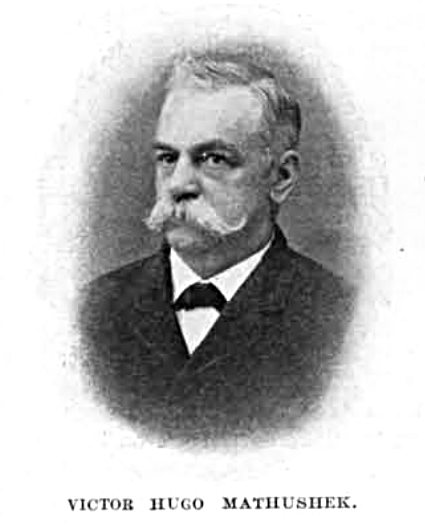
Victor Hugo Mathushek

From 1882 to 1886 the name was claimed by Mathushek & Kinkeldey, at 210 East 129th street, New York, which had been founded by Frederick Mathushek's grandson Victor Hugo Mathushek (who had changed his surname from Doehler legally in early 1876) and who was joined by Charles Kinkeldey, the former superintendent for (John B.) Dunham & Sons, which had failed unexpectedly toward the end of 1880. V. H. Mathushek became sole owner of the company in 1886 and the firm became Mathushek & Son, located at 108 East 125th street and 242-244 East 122nd street and showed $35,000 in assets in 1887, but in April, 1888 the company was turned over to assignors.

Mathushek & Son was incorporated under the laws of New York in 1890, directed by Frederick and Victor Hugo Mathushek, and Charles and C. Albert Jacob, of piano manufacturers Jacob Brothers, founded by them in 1877 in New York.

== See also ==
- Development of the modern piano
- Innovations in the piano

== Explanatory notes ==
1. Spillane wrote he worked in all these cities but Dolge, who worked under Mathushek between 1867 and 1869, wrote "he traveled though Germany and Austria, and finally landed in Henri Pape's shop at Paris" before returning to Worms. A table shaped piano he built at Worms was part of the Ibach Museum at Barmen - "Mathuschek-Hammerklavier in Form eines achteckigen Teetischs", Worms 1840

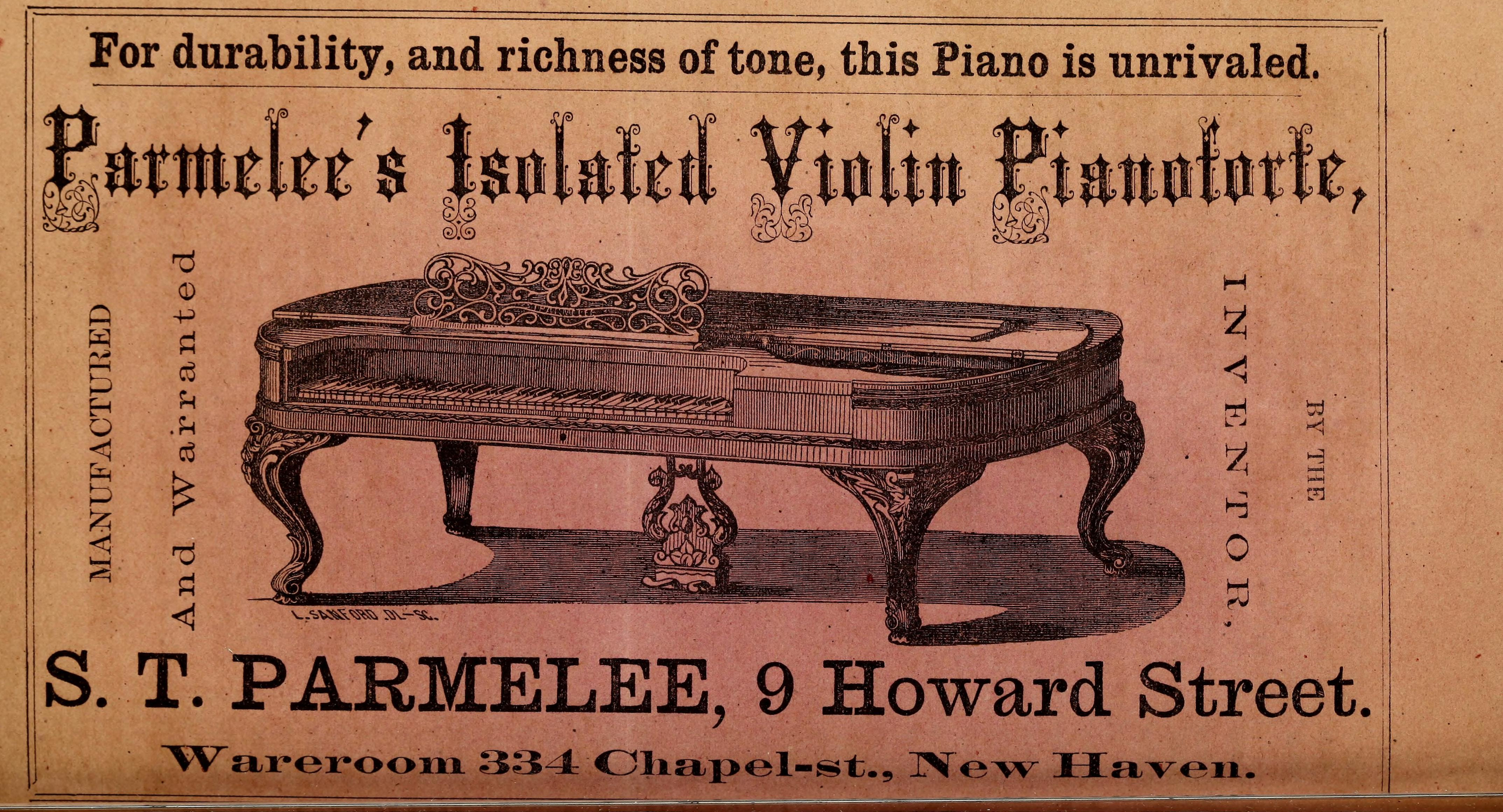
Parmelee's Isolated Violin Pianoforte, 1863

1. In June, 1855 a piano was displayed at 505 Broadway, New York, that incorporated Driggs' attachment - which was said to add $50 to $75 to the cost - as well as fellow Detroit inventor Hubert Schonacker's tuning mechanisms and "octave scale," which was a direct precursor to the modern duplex scale. Driggs was listed at that address in 1856; in 1857 William Vincent Wallace organized the Wallace Pianoforte Company based on the promise of Driggs' subsequent patents, but it only appears in city directories for two years. By 1859 Driggs' inventions were owned by Driggs, Parmelee & Co., and then the manufacturing interests sold to Driggs Patent Piano Co., and transferred by 1862 to Briggs & Tooker, who offered to resurrect worn out pianos with their newly patented string clamps, J. B. Peck in 1862, and the Driggs Piano Co. in 1864, before the name disappeared about 1870. ("Musical Gossip" New-York Musical Review and Gazette June 30, 1855, p. 210; January 24, 1857 p. 17; July 25, 1857; advertisements. New York Times September 28, 1850; February 2, 1860; February 20, 1862; October 10, 1864)
2. As late as 1897 Mathushek Piano Mfg. Co. advertised "established 1866" but later pianos have "estab. 1863" in the label as well as cast into the iron frames.
3. No pianos won first premium and second premiums were also awarded to Manner & Co., for the Union piano, and Ouvrier & Sons, for an upright piano. "American Institute Fair" New York Times October 27, 1867
4. Victor Hugo Mathushek is referred to as both Mathushek's son and grandson. He was son of Haermine Mathushek, born in Germany about 1835, and who was listed partners in Barlow & Mathushek, a piano store at 694 Broadway, New York, with former portrait seller Warren Sumner Barlow in 1869. Hugo and his sister Alma were listed living with Frederick and Johanna Mathushek (born c. 1815 in Hesse) in New Haven in 1870. By 1880 Haermine was married to Edward Fischer, the future conductor of the Harlem Conservatory of Music, and Alma lived with them in Manhattan. Hugo lived with them by 1900.
5. Wessell (b.January 5, 1877) was son of Otto Wessel and took charge of the Wessell, Nickel & Gross piano action factory, serving as treasurer after his father died in 1899. He copatented an improvement in grand actions in 1909, which was assigned to WNG, and also patented half blow mechanisms for player grand pianos using movable hammer rest rails in 1920 and 1922. George Von Skal. History of German Immigration in the United States and Successful German-Americans and their Descendants. Frederick T. Smiley, New York, 1910. p. 252-255
