= Collenette =

Collenette is a surname. Notable people with the surname include:

- Beatrice Collenette (1899–2001), Guernsey-born American dancer
- David Collenette (born 1946), Canadian politician
- Iris Sheila Collenette (1927–2017), British botanist
- Penny Collenette (born 1950), Canadian professor and political figure
