= Parmelee (surname) =

Parmelee is a surname. Notable people with the surname include:

- Alice Parmelee (died 1992), American politician
- Annette W. Parmelee (1865–1924), American suffragist and temperance activist
- Arthur H. Parmelee (1883–1961), U.S. physician and football coach
- Ashbel P. Fitch (P. for Parmelee; 1848–1904), U.S. Representative from the state of New York
- Charles Henry Parmelee (1855–1914), Canadian publisher and politician
- Chris Parmelee (born 1988), U.S. baseball player
- Edward Parmelee Smith (1827–1876), U.S. religious leader, educator, co-founder of Fisk University
- Henry S. Parmelee (c.1846–1902), U.S. inventor, piano manufacturer, and streetcar/tram company president
- Horace Parmelee (1889–1957), U.S. talent manager and concert promoter
- Irene E. Parmelee (1847–1934), U.S. portrait artist
- James Parmelee (fl. 1886), U.S. financier
- Martha Parmelee Rose (1834-1923), U.S. journalist, reformer and philanthropist
- Philip Orin Parmelee (1887–1912), U.S. aviation pioneer
- Roy Parmelee (1907–1981), U.S. baseball player

== See also ==
- Jalen Parmele (born 1985), U.S. football player
- Mary Platt Parmele (1843–1911), U.S. author and historian
