= Piano history and musical performance =

The modern form of the piano, which emerged in the late 19th century, is a very different instrument from the pianos for which earlier classical piano literature was originally composed. The modern piano has a heavy metal frame, thick strings made of top-grade steel, and a sturdy action with a substantial touch weight. These changes have created a piano with a powerful tone that carries well in large halls, and which produces notes with a very long sustain time. The contrast with earlier instruments, particularly those of the 18th century (with light wooden frames, lightly sprung actions, and short sustain time) is very noticeable. These changes have given rise to interpretive questions and controversies about performing earlier literature on modern pianos, particularly since recent decades have seen the revival of historical instruments for concert use.

== Background ==
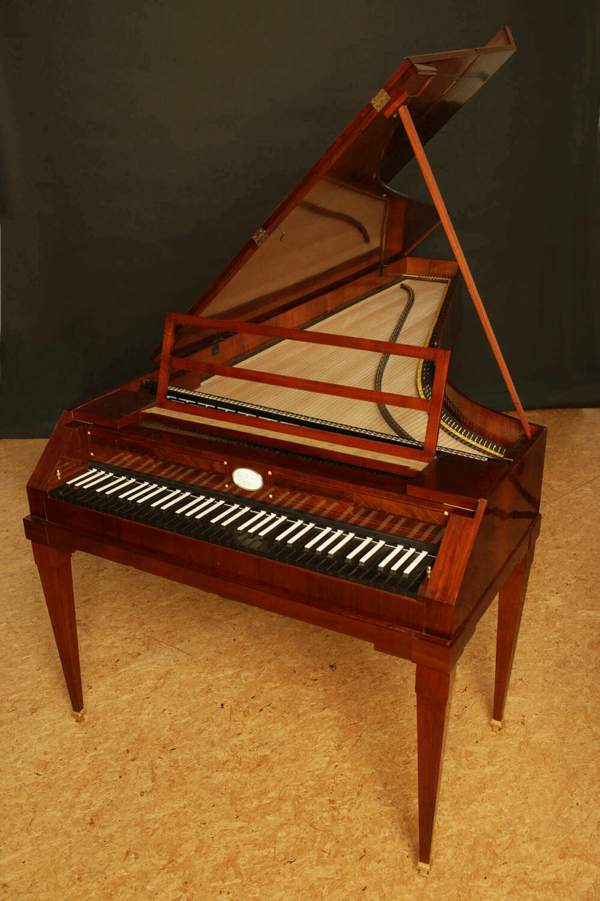
Fortepiano by Paul McNulty after Walter & Sohn, ca. 1805

The earliest pianos by Cristofori (ca. 1700) were lightweight objects, hardly sturdier in framing than a contemporary harpsichord, with thin strings of low tensile strength iron and brass and small, lightweight hammers. During the Classical era, when pianos first became used widely by important composers, the piano was only somewhat more robust than in Cristofori's time; see fortepiano. It was during the period from about 1790 to 1870 that most of the important changes were made that created the modern piano:

- An increase in pitch range, from five octaves (see image at right) to the modern standard of seven and 1/3 octaves.
- iron framing, culminating in the single-piece cast iron frame
- ultra-tough steel strings, with three strings per note in the upper 2/3 of the instrument's range
- felt hammers
- cross-stringing
- in general, an enormous increase in weight and robustness. A modern Steinway Model D weighs 480 kg (1,060 lb), about six times the weight of a late 18th-century Stein piano.
- The hammers and action became much heavier so that the touch (key weight) of a modern piano is several times heavier than that of an 18th-century piano.

The prototype of the modern piano, with all of these changes in place, was exhibited to general acclaim by Steinway at the Paris exhibition of 1867; by about 1900, most leading piano manufacturers had incorporated most of these changes.

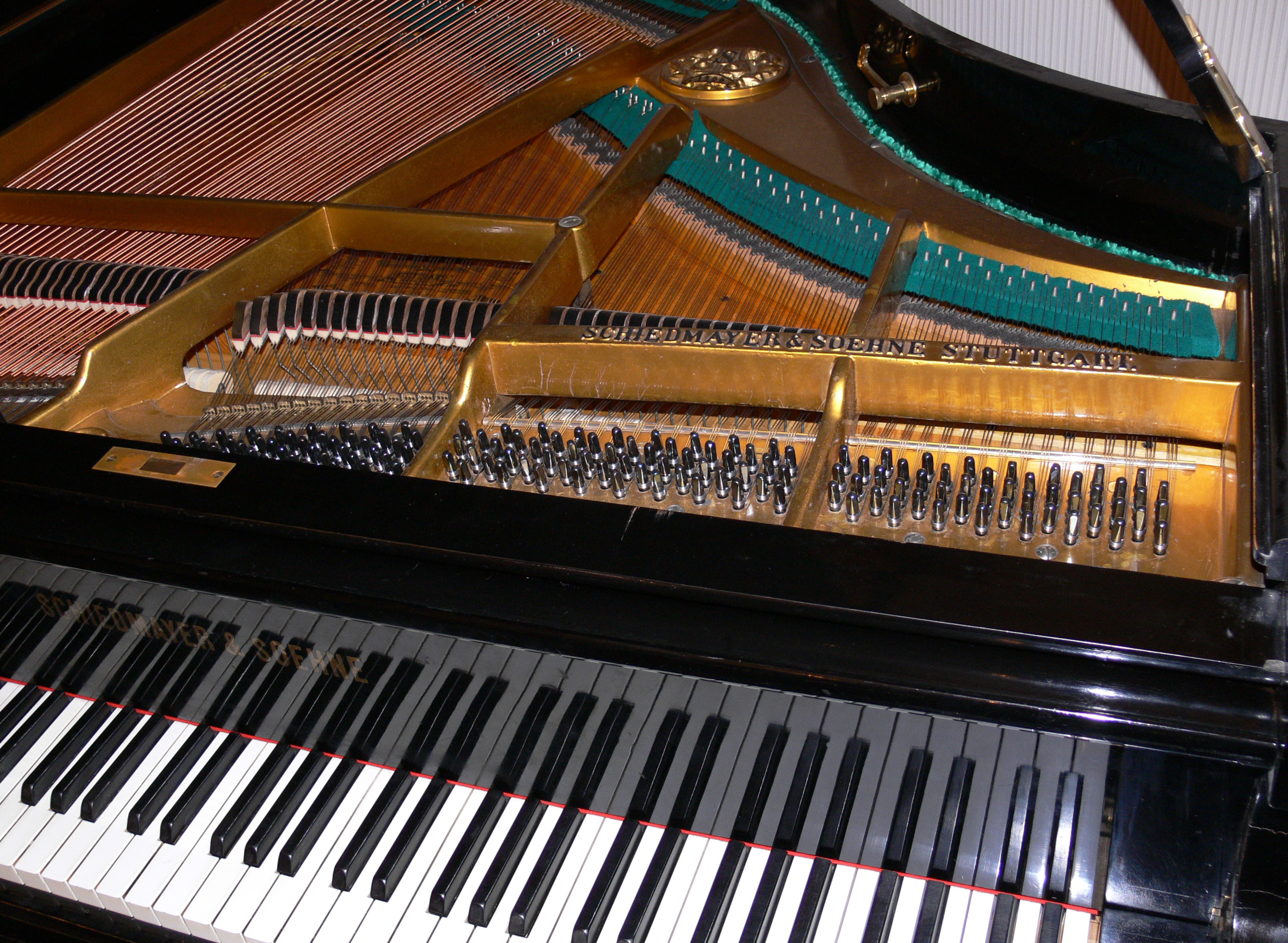
The interior of a modern grand. The sturdy metal frame, thick multiple strings, and cross-stringing all can be seen.

These huge changes in the piano have somewhat vexing consequences for musical performance. The problem is that much of the most widely admired piano repertoire was composed for a type of instrument that is very different from the modern instruments on which this music is normally performed today. The greatest difference is in the pianos used by the composers of the Classical era; for example, Haydn, Mozart, and Beethoven. But lesser difference are found for later composers as well. The music of the early Romantics, such as Chopin and Schumann—and even of still later composers (see below) --was written for pianos substantially different from ours.

One view that is sometimes taken is that these composers were dissatisfied with their pianos, and in fact were writing visionary "music of the future" with a more robust sound in mind. This view is perhaps plausible in the case of Beethoven, who composed at the beginning of the era of piano growth. However, many aspects of earlier music can be mentioned suggesting that it was composed very much with contemporary instruments in mind. It is these aspects that raise the greatest difficulties when a performer attempts to render earlier works on a modern instrument.

== Sources of difficulty ==
=== Sustain time ===
The modern piano has a considerably greater sustain time than the classical-era piano. Thus, notes played in accompaniment lines will stay loud longer, and thus cover up any subsequent melodic notes more than they would have on the instrument that the composer had used. This is felt to be a particular impediment to realizing the characteristic textural clarity of Classical-era works. As an anonymous commentator (see References below) writes, "[the] earlier instruments all demonstrate a lighter and clearer sound than their modern counterparts. Lines can emerge more clearly; rapid passages and ornaments are more easily enunciated by instruments whose main purpose is not volume and power."

=== Pedal marks in Classical-era works ===
During the Classical era, the damper pedal was generally not used as it is in later music; that is, as a more or less constant amplification and modulation of the basic piano sound. Instead, pedaling was employed as a particular expressive effect, applied to certain individual musical passages.

Classical composers sometimes wrote long passages in which the player is directed to keep the damper pedal down throughout. One example occurs in Haydn's Piano Sonata H. XVI/50, from 1794-1795; and two later well-known instances occur in Beethoven's work: in the last movement of the "Waldstein" sonata, Op. 53; and the entire first movement of the "Moonlight" sonata, Op. 27 No. 2. Because of the great sustain time of a modern piano, these passages sound very blurred and dissonant if the pedal is pressed all the way down and held for the duration of the passage. Thus, modern pianists typically modify their playing style to help compensate for the difference in instruments, for example by lifting the pedal discreetly (and often partially), or by half or quarter-pedaling. For further discussion of such modifications, see Piano Sonata No. 14 (Beethoven).

=== Ensemble issues ===
Pianos are often played in chamber ensembles with string instruments, which also evolved considerably during the 19th century. Charles Rosen, in The Classical Style (p. 353) offers a clear characterization of the problems that arise in Classical-era works:

"Instrumental changes since the eighteenth century have made a problem out of the balance of sound in ... all chamber music with piano. Violin necks (including, of course, even those of the Stradivariuses and Guarneris) have been lengthened, making the strings tauter; the bows are used today with hairs considerably tighter as well. The sound is a good deal more brilliant, fatter, and more penetrating. ... The piano, in turn, has become louder, richer, even mushier in sound, and, above all, less wiry and metallic. This change makes nonsense out of all those passages in eighteenth-century music where the violin and the piano play the same melody in thirds, with the violin below the piano. Both the piano and the violin are now louder, but the piano is less piercing, the violin more. Violinists today have to make an effort of self-sacrifice to allow the piano to sing out softly ... The thinner sound of the violin in Haydn's day blended more easily with the metallic sonority of the contemporary piano and made it possible for each to accompany the other without strain."

=== The una corda pedal ===
Beethoven's Piano Sonata No. 28, Movement III
Daniel Veesey's performance of Movement III of Beethoven's Piano Sonata No, 28, Op. 101, from Musopen.com.

The una corda pedal is also called the "soft pedal". On grand pianos (both modern and historical), it shifts the action sideways, so that the hammers do not strike every string of a note. (There are normally three strings, except in the lower range.)

On the modern piano, the soft pedal can only reduce the number of strings struck from three to two, whereas the pianos of the classical era were more flexible, permitting the player to select whether the hammers would strike three strings, two, or just one. The very term "una corda", Italian for "one-string", is thus an anachronism as applied to modern pianos.

In two of his best-known works for piano Beethoven made full use of the capabilities of the "una corda" stop.

- In the Piano Sonata, Op. 101 (1816), he marks the beginning of the third movement with the words "Mit einer Saite", German for "on one string". At the end of this movement, there is a passage that forms a continuous transition to the following movement. Here, Beethoven writes "Nach und nach mehrere Saite", "gradually more strings".
- More elaborate instructions are given in the second movement of the Fourth Piano Concerto: during a long crescendo trill at the start of the cadenza, "due e poi tre corde", Italian for "two and then three strings" (the movement up to this point has been played una corda). The effect is reversed on a long decrescendo trill at the end of the cadenza: "due poi una corda".

Concerning the Fourth Piano Concerto example, Owen Jander has written, "the una corda on [the type of piano for which Beethoven wrote the concerto] is hauntingly beautiful and evocative. To shift the action from the una corda position to the full tre-corde position produces only a slight increase in volume; what is exciting is the unfolding of the timbre of the instrument."

== Historically informed performance ==
Not all performers attempt to adapt the older music to the modern instruments: participants in the historically informed performance movement have constructed new copies of the old instruments (or occasionally, restored originals) and used them in performance. This form of musical exploration, which has been widely pursued the music of the Classical era, has provided important new insights and interpretations of the music. It has also made it possible to get a clearer idea of what a Classical composer meant in specifying particular pedaling directions; thus, performances of Beethoven's works on historical pianos can and typically do respect the composer's own pedal marks.

== Differences in pianos used by later composers ==
Although most of the scholarly focus on differences in pianos covers the Classical era, it is also true that even in the Romantic era—and later— the pianos for which the great composers wrote were not the same as the pianos that are generally used today in performing their music.

=== Brahms ===
One example is the last piano owned by Johannes Brahms. This instrument was made in 1868 by the Streicher firm, which was run by the descendants of the great pioneer 18th-century maker Johann Andreas Stein. It was given by the Streicher company to Brahms in 1873 and was kept and used by him for composition until his death in 1897. The piano was evidently destroyed during the Second World War. Piano scholar Edwin Good (1986; see References below) has examined a very similar Streicher piano made in 1870, with the goal of finding out more about Brahms's instrument. This 1870 Streicher has leather (not felt) hammers, a rather light metal frame (with just two tension bars), a range of just seven octaves (four notes short of the modern range), straight- (rather than cross-) stringing, and a rather light Viennese action, a more robust version of the kind created a century earlier by Stein.

Good observes (p. 201): "the tone, especially in the bass, is open, has relatively strong higher partials than a Steinway would have, and gives a somewhat distinct, though not hard, sound." He goes on to note the implications of these differences for the performance of Brahms's music:

"to hear Brahms's music on an instrument like the Streicher is to realize that the thick textures we associate with his work, the sometimes muddy chords in the bass and the occasionally woolly sonorities, come cleaner and clearer on a lighter, straight-strung piano. Those textures, then, are not a fault of Brahms's piano composition. To be sure, any sensitive pianist can avoid making Brahms sound murky on a modern piano. The point is that the modern pianist must strive to avoid that effect, must work at lightening the dark colors, where Brahms himself, playing his Streicher, did not have to work at it."

Although the revival of later such 19th-century pianos has not been pursued to anywhere near the extent seen in the Classical fortepiano, the effort has from time to time been made; for instance, the pianist Jörg Demus has issued a recording of Brahms's works as performed on pianos of his day.

=== Ravel ===
Good (1986) also describes an 1894 piano made by the Erard company of Paris. This instrument is straight- (not cross-) strung, has only seven octaves, and uses iron bracing but not a full-frame. According to Good (p. 216) "[while], some Erards were equal in volume and richness of Steinways and Bechsteins...the "typical" Erard sound was lighter than that of its competitors." He goes on to say "though Claude Debussy preferred the Bechstein, Maurice Ravel liked the glassy sound of the Erard."

Thus, even for major composers of the first part of the 20th century, the possibility exists that performers might profitably experiment with what would count as "authentic" pianos, in light of the particular composer's own musical preferences. To this end the pianist Gwendolyn Mok has recently made commercial recordings of Ravel's music on an 1875 Erard piano; see External Links below.

== See also ==
- Historically informed performance
- Bartolomeo Cristofori
- Fortepiano
- Piano
- Piano pedals
- Piano wire
