= Deuce Coupe =

Deuce Coupe is a ballet by choreographer Twyla Tharp, set to music by the Beach Boys, for the Joffrey Ballet. The ballet has been in their repertory in several redactions since the 1970s, and is still being performed.

Deuce Coupe is often referred to as the first crossover ballet, combining classical ballet vocabulary with pedestrian actions, modern dance, jazz and a variety of movements of Tharp's own invention. The title refers to a 1932 Ford Model 18 coupe with a flathead V8 enjoyed by hotrodders/drag racers mainly in the 1960s.

Music by The Beach Boys included "Little Deuce Coupe”, “Alley Oop", "Good Vibrations," “Catch A Wave”, and “Wouldn’t It Be Nice.”

The ballet's world premiere was February 8, 1973 by Joffrey Ballet in Chicago.
