= Continental Airport Express =

Continental Airport Express, now operating as Airport Express, is a private shuttle van and bus service operating between Chicago's O'Hare International Airport, Chicago's Loop and various Chicago city and suburban hotels. Continental Airport Express is a successor company to the Parmalee Transfer Company, which was founded in 1853 and moved passengers and baggage between Chicago's six downtown railroad terminals. In 2024, following its acquisition by New England Transportation Group, the company resumed operating under the Airport Express name after retiring the GO Airport Express brand.
