= Brahms/Handel =

1984 ballet by Jerome Robbins and Twyla Tharp

Brahms/Handel is a ballet made by New York City Ballet ballet master Jerome Robbins in collaboration with Twyla Tharp to Brahms' Variations and Fugue on a Theme by Handel, Op. 24 (1861), orchestrated by Edmund Rubbra. The premiere took place Thursday, June 7, 1984 at the New York State Theater, Lincoln Center, with costumes by Oscar de la Renta and lighting by Jennifer Tipton.

== Casts ==
=== Original ===
- Merrill Ashley
- Maria Calegari
- Ib Andersen
- Bart Cook

=== NYCB revivals ===
==== 2008 Spring — Jerome Robbins celebration ====
first cast

- Ashley Bouder
- Wendy Whelan
- Philip Neal
- Andrew Veyette

second cast

- Abi Stafford
- Sara Mearns
- Gonzalo Garcia
- Jared Angle

== Articles ==
- NY Times, Anna Kisselgoff, November 13, 1983
- Sunday NY Times, Anna Kisselgoff, April 22, 1984

== Reviews ==
- NY Times, Anna Kisselgoff, June 9, 1984
- NY Times, Alastair Macaulay, June 24, 2008
