= Alice Parmelee =

American politician (died 1992)

Member of the Connecticut House of Representatives from Hartland
- In office 1943–1945 Serving with William Schnetsky
- Preceded by: William Schnetsky; Frederick C. Raabe
- Succeeded by: Perry M. Ransom; Dwight G. Stone
- In office 1953–1955 Serving with James B. Hall
- Preceded by: James B. Hall; Edward B. Flagg
- Succeeded by: James B. Hall; Luther B. Martin

Personal details
- Born: Alice Emmons; 1902 or 1903
- Died: September 26, 1992 (aged 89)
- Party: Republican
- Spouse: Gladwin E. Parmelee
- Children: 2

Alice Parmelee (died September 26, 1992) was an American politician who served in the Connecticut House of Representatives from 1943 to 1945 and 1953 to 1955, representing the town of Hartland as a Republican.

== Personal life ==
Parmelee was married to Gladwin E. Parmelee, with whom she had two sons.

Parmelee died on September 26, 1992, at age 89.

== Political career ==
Parmelee was first elected to the Connecticut House of Representatives in 1942 and served one term representing the town of Hartland as a Republican. She ran for reelection in 1944 as an Independent Republican but was defeated.

In 1952, Parmelee again ran to represent Hartland as a Republican and was elected. She served one term alongside fellow Republican James B. Hall and did not run for reelection in 1954.

Parmelee was a member of the Order of Women Legislators.
