= Parmelee Transfer Company =

Parmelee Transfer Company was a transportation company founded in 1852 by Franklin Parmelee to facilitate the transfer of passengers and baggage between downtown railroad terminals in Chicago. Originally a horse-drawn hack, the company evolved into a motor driven van shuttle and limousine service. The City of Chicago granted Parmelee the exclusive franchise for station transfer trade moving passengers and baggage, which the company held until 1971.

After Amtrak consolidated inter-city railroad passenger services at Chicago's Union Station, Parmelee ceased operations under the Parmelee name, but continues as Continental Airport Express.
