= Jean-Henri Pape =

French maker of pianos and harps

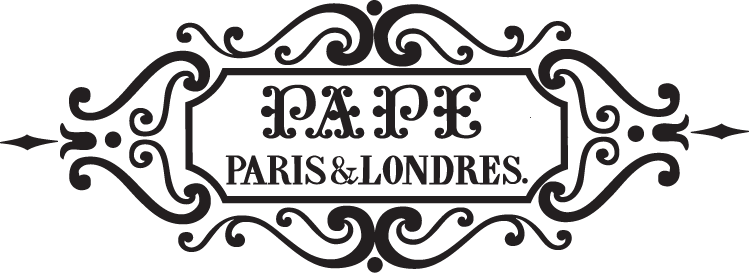

Jean-Henri Pape, born as Johann Heinrich Pape and also known as Henry Pape (1 July 1789 – 2 February 1875), was a French piano and harp maker in the early 19th century.

Pape was born in Sarstedt, Germany, in 1789. He arrived in Paris in 1811 and started working with Austrian composer Pleyel, eventually directing many of his workshops. In 1815, he established his own company to manufacture pianos. His first grand pianos followed the English system of Broadwood and Tomkinson. Pape's main focus was on defects in square and grand pianos caused by the structural gap between the sounding board and wrest plank that allowed the hammers to strike the strings. He fixed them by placing actions above the strings. Instead of levers and counterweights, Pape used a Coil spring to raise the hammers quickly and with almost no effect. This system was more successful in squares than grand pianos. The variations he introduced in the forms and actions of upright pianos gave his instruments more power.

In 1827, Pape invented a machine used to saw wood or ivory in spirals. In 1832, his instruments received favorable reports from the Société d’encouragement pour l’industrie nationale, as well as from l'Académie des beaux-arts de l'institut de France in 1833. He earned a gold medal at the French Industrial Exposition of 1834, as well as a medal of the Legion of Honor in 1839. One of his pianos was veneered with sheets of ivory nine feet long and two feet wide. He created pianos with asymmetrical cases, like the "giraffe piano." A small pamphlet commemorated his contributions to the instrument. Pape’s students included the German piano makers Carl Bechstein and Frederick Mathushek.

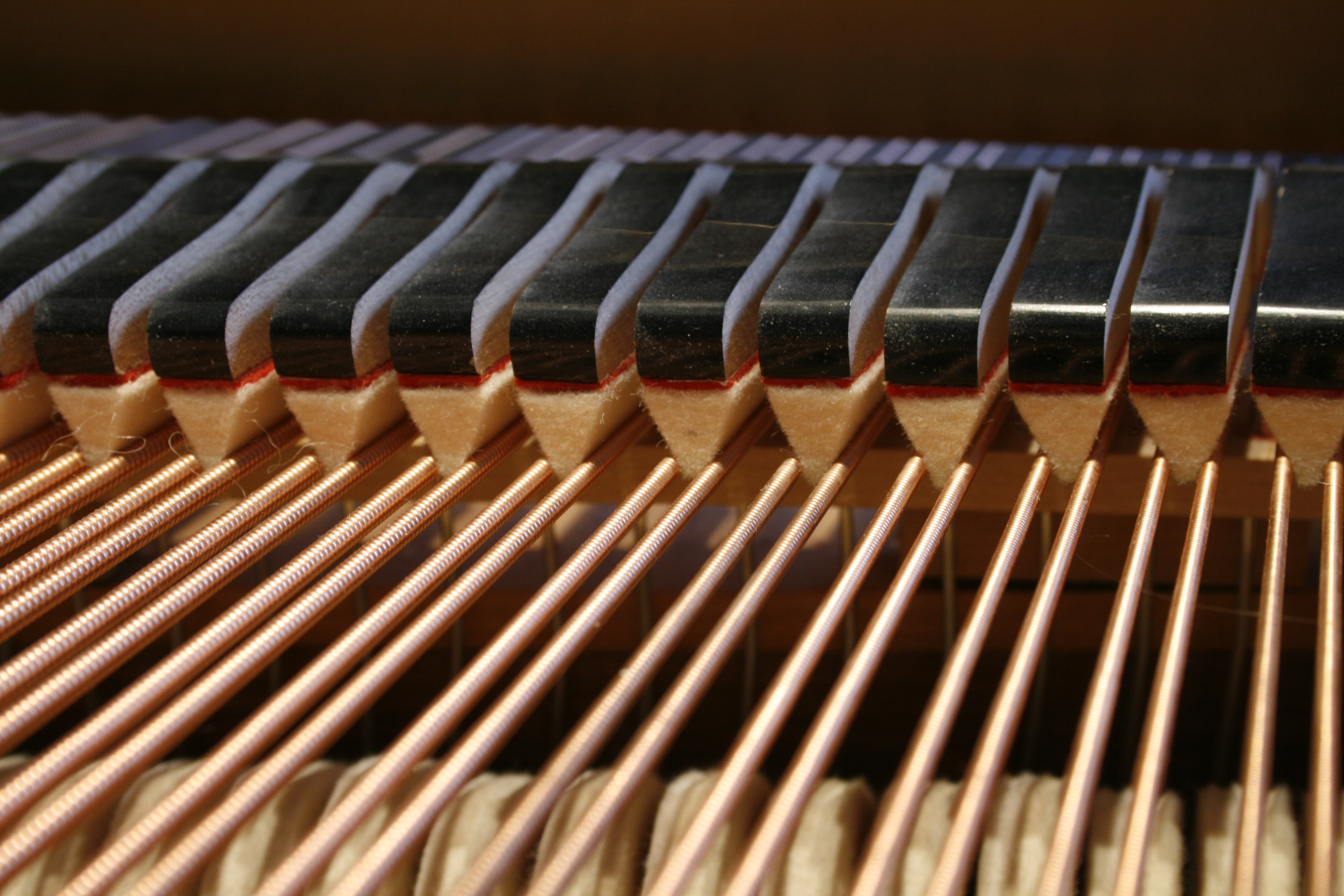
Piano hammers

Pape, impoverished and unable to cope with the increasing Industrialisation in the production of pianos, died in 1875 in the Paris suburb of Asnières-sur-Seine. His son and nephew managed the factory after his death.
