= Beatrice Collenette =

American dancer (1899–2001)

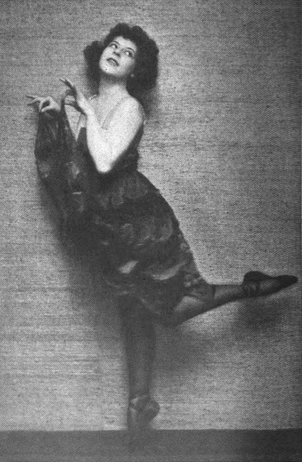
Beatrice Collenette, from a 1921 publication

Beatrice Collenette (1899 – 2001) was a Guernsey-born American dancer and dance educator, and the founder of the Collenette School of Dancing in Pasadena, California in 1926. She was a protégée of Anna Pavlova and the first ballet teacher of Twyla Tharp.

== Early life and education ==
Collenette was born in Guernsey on the Channel Islands. After her father, physician Frank de Beauchamp Collenette, became too ill to practice, she moved to London, England, to perform and earn a living.

She studied with Russian ballerina Anna Pavlova at Ivy House in London, and danced in her company. Pavlova treated young Collenette almost as a daughter for a time, but she was irritated by the girl's preference for practicing technique at the expense of expressiveness. After her time with Pavlova, she also studied with Enrico Cecchetti and Ivan Clustine.

== Career ==
Collenette was taken to the United States after World War I by theatrical manager Henry Wilson Savage. She appeared on the Broadway stage twice in musicals: in Zelda Sears's Lady Billy (1920–1921), and in Jack and Jill (1923). In 1926, Collenette founded the Collenette School of Dancing in Pasadena, California. By 1931, she was appearing in regional newspaper advertisements, endorsing Welch's Grape Juice. In 1936, Collenette was chosen to teach San Francisco Ballet classes during Adolph Bolm's absence. Her ballet company mostly performed at the Pasadena Community Playhouse, but also toured regionally and nationally.

Among her young students in the 1950s was dancer and choreographer Twyla Tharp.

== Personal life and legacy ==
Collenette married journalist Joseph Kenyon Ivie, moved to California, and had a daughter, Joan Collenette Damon, who followed her mother into dance education as head of the Collenette School of Dancing for forty years, until she retired in 2002. Beatrice Collenette marked her 100th birthday with family and former students in San Juan Capistrano in 1999. She died in 2001, aged 102 years.

The Collenette school remains in operation in San Marino, California, as of December 2017.
