= Twyla Tharp =

American dancer and choreographer (born 1941)

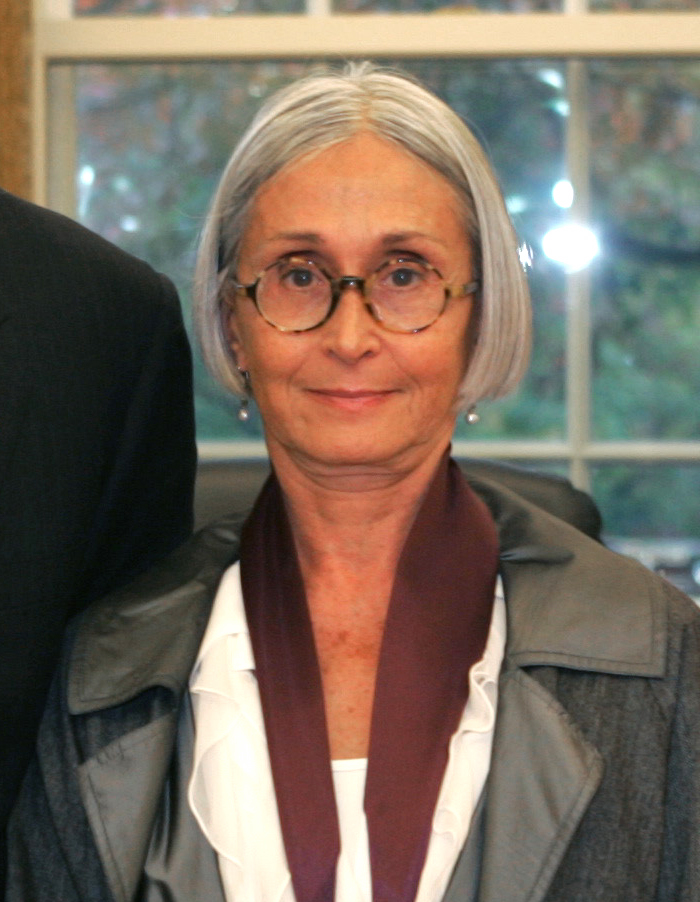
- Tharp in 2004
- Born: July 1, 1941 (age 85); Portland, Indiana, U.S.
- Education: Pomona College; Barnard College
- Occupations: Choreographer; dancer
- Years active: 1960s–present
- Awards: Drama Desk Award for Outstanding Choreography, 2003 Movin' Out; Primetime Emmy Award for Outstanding Choreography 1985 Baryshnikov by Tharp with American Ballet Theatre; Tony Award for Best Choreography, 2003 Movin' Out
- Website: www.twylatharp.org

Twyla Tharp (/ˈtwaɪlə ˈθɑːrp/; born July 1, 1941) is an American dancer, choreographer, and author who lives and works in New York City. In 1965 she formed the company Twyla Tharp Dance, which merged with American Ballet Theatre in 1988. She regrouped the company in 1991. Her work often uses classical, jazz, and contemporary pop music.

From 1971 to 1988, Twyla Tharp Dance toured extensively around the world, performing original works. In 1973 Tharp choreographed Deuce Coupe to the music of The Beach Boys for the Joffrey Ballet. Deuce Coupe is considered the first "crossover ballet", a mix of ballet and modern dance. Later she choreographed Push Comes to Shove (1976), which featured Mikhail Baryshnikov and is now thought to be the best example of crossover ballet.

On May 24, 2018, Tharp was awarded an honorary Doctor of Arts degree by Harvard University.

== Early life and education ==
Tharp was born in 1941 on a farm in Portland, Indiana, the daughter of William Tharp and Lecile (Confer) Tharp. She was named for Twila Thornburg, the "Pig Princess" of the 89th Annual Muncie Fair.

As a child, Tharp spent a few months each year living with her Quaker grandparents on their farm in Indiana. Tharp's mother insisted she take lessons in dance, various musical instruments, shorthand, German and French. In 1950, Tharp's family—younger sister Twanette, twin brothers Stanley and Stanford, and her parents—moved to Rialto, California. William and Lecile operated Tharp Motors and Tharp Autos in Rialto. They also opened a drive-in theater, where Tharp worked. She attended Pacific High School in San Bernardino, studied at the Vera Lynn School of Dance, and studied ballet with Beatrice Collenette. A "devoted bookworm", Tharp has said her schedule left little time for a social life. She attended Pomona College, but transferred to Barnard College after being caught making out with her boyfriend and threatened with expulsion. She graduated from Barnard with a degree in art history in 1963. In New York City, she studied with Richard Thomas, Martha Graham and Merce Cunningham. In 1963, Tharp joined the Paul Taylor Dance Company.

== Career ==
=== Dances and ballets ===
In 1965, Tharp choreographed her first dance, Tank Dive, and formed her own company, Twyla Tharp Dance. Her work often utilizes classical music, jazz, and contemporary pop music. From 1971 to 1988, Twyla Tharp Dance toured extensively around the world, performing original works.

In 1973, Tharp choreographed Deuce Coupe to the music of The Beach Boys for the Joffrey Ballet. Deuce Coupe is considered the first crossover ballet. Later, she choreographed Push Comes to Shove (1976) for American Ballet Theatre and Mikhail Baryshnikov; the work has been described as a groundbreaking crossover ballet integrating classical ballet and modern dance.

In 1988, Twyla Tharp Dance merged with American Ballet Theatre, since which time ABT has premiered 16 of Tharp's works. In 2010 it had 20 of her works in its repertory. Tharp has since choreographed dances for Paris Opera Ballet, The Royal Ballet, New York City Ballet, Boston Ballet, Joffrey Ballet, Pacific Northwest Ballet, Miami City Ballet, American Ballet Theatre, Hubbard Street Dance and Martha Graham Dance Company. She also created the dance roadshow Cutting Up (1992) with Baryshnikov, which went on to tour and appeared in 28 cities over two months.

In 1995, Twyla Tharp held auditions globally to find new talent, forming what would become the three-year touring project Tharp! During this time, she set over six new works on the troupe, including Heroes featuring music by Philip Glass, Diabelli to the music of Ludwig van Beethoven, Roy’s Joys set to the music of Roy Eldridge, and Sweet Fields, set to 19th century Shaker hymns. In 1998, her piece Yamayá, infused with the sounds of the Buena Vista Social Club, premiered at Memorial Auditorium, Stanford University. After completing its third year of touring internationally, Tharp! was discontinued at the end of 1998. Several of its members went on to prominence in the dance world, including principals at the Royal Ballet and the Metropolitan Opera, as well as launching the career of notable choreographer Jessica Lang, who made her professional debut in Tharp! after being recruited directly out of the Juilliard School.

In 2000, Twyla Tharp Dance regrouped with entirely new dancers. This company also performed around the world, and with it Tharp developed the material that became Movin' Out, an award-winning Broadway musical featuring the songs of Billy Joel and starring many of the dancers in the company.

In 2012, Tharp created the full-length ballet The Princess and the Goblin, based on George MacDonald's story The Princess and the Goblin. It is her first ballet to include children, and was co-commissioned by Atlanta Ballet and Royal Winnipeg Ballet and performed by both companies.

Tharp was the first Artist in Residency (A.I.R.) at Pacific Northwest Ballet in Seattle. During this time she created and premiered Waiting At The Station, a work with music by R&B artist Allen Toussaint and sets and costumes by longtime collaborator Santo Loquasto.

=== Broadway ===
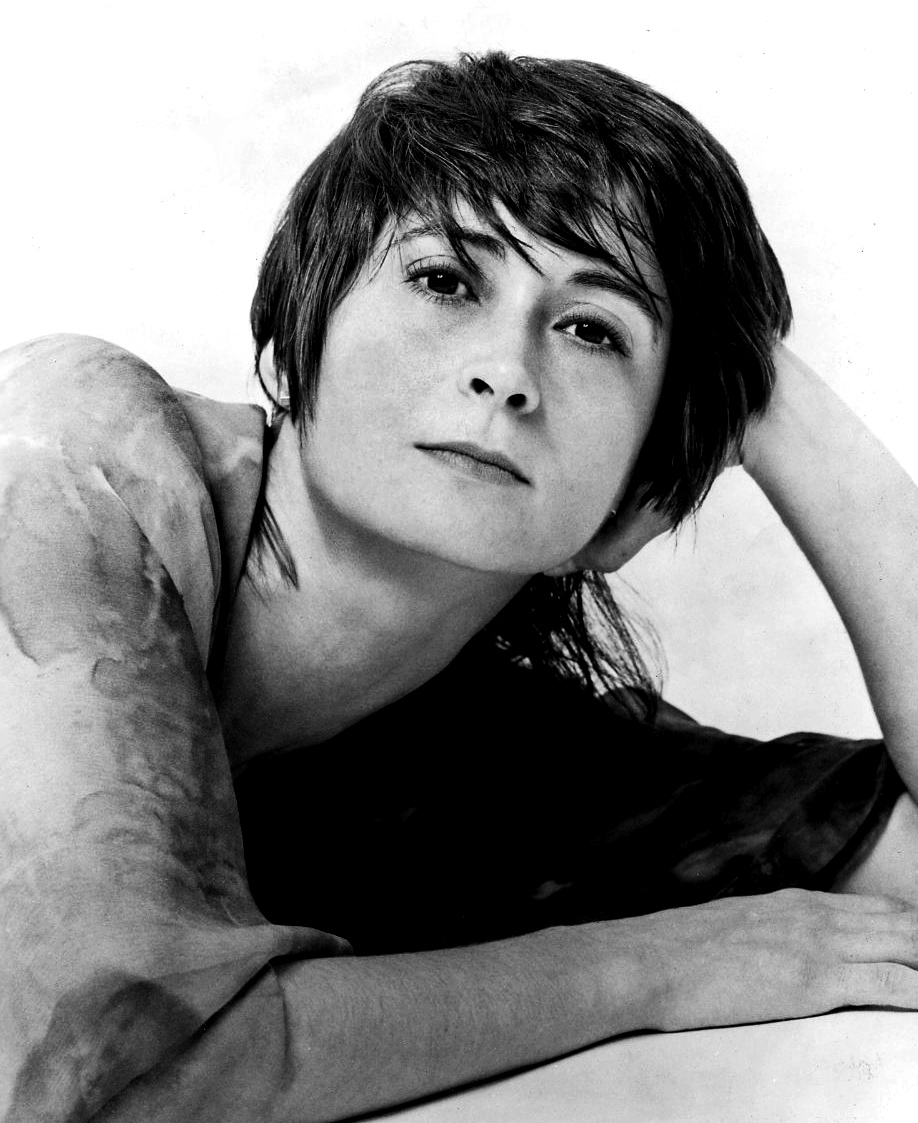
Tharp in 1981

In 1980, Tharp's work first appeared on Broadway with Twyla Tharp Dance performing When We Were Very Young, followed in 1981 by The Catherine Wheel, her collaboration with David Byrne at the Winter Garden. Wheel was broadcast on PBS and its soundtrack released on LP. Her dance piece Fait Accompli was set to music by David Van Tieghem as released on the These Things Happen LP (1984).

In 1985, her staging of Singin' in the Rain played at the Gershwin for 367 performances.

Tharp premiered her dance musical Movin' Out, set to the music and lyrics of Billy Joel, in Chicago in 2001. The show opened on Broadway in 2002. Movin' Out ran for 1,331 performances on Broadway. A national tour opened in January 2004. It received 10 Tony nominations and Tharp won Best Choreographer.

Tharp opened a new show, The Times They Are a-Changin', to the music of Bob Dylan in 2005 at The Old Globe Theatre in San Diego. The Times They are A-Changin' set the records for the highest-grossing show and highest ticket sales as of the date of closing (March 2006). It was also the first show to receive a second extension before the first preview. After its run in California, the New York show ran for 35 previews and 28 performances.

In 2009, Tharp worked with the songs of Frank Sinatra to mount Come Fly with Me, which ran at the Alliance Theater in Atlanta and was the best-selling four-week run as of the date of closing in 2009. Renamed Come Fly Away, the show opened on Broadway in 2010 at the Marquis Theatre and ran for 26 previews and 188 performances. Come Fly Away, was retooled and opened under the title Sinatra: Dance with Me at The Wynn Las Vegas in 2011. Come Fly Away National Tour opened in Atlanta in August 2011.

=== Film and television ===
Tharp collaborated with film directors Miloš Forman on Hair (1978), Ragtime (1980) and Amadeus (1983); Taylor Hackford on White Nights (1985); and James Brooks on I'll Do Anything (1994).

Her television credits include choreographing Sue's Leg (1976) for the inaugural episode of the PBS program Dance in America; co-producing and directing Making Television Dance (1977), which won the Chicago International Film Festival Award; and directing The Catherine Wheel (1983) for BBC Television. Tharp co-directed the award-winning television special "Baryshnikov by Tharp" in 1984.

=== Author ===
Tharp has written four books: an early autobiography, Push Comes to Shove (1992; Bantam Books); The Creative Habit: Learn It and Use It for Life (2003, Simon & Schuster), translated into Spanish, Chinese, Russian, Korean, Thai and Japanese; The Collaborative Habit (2009, Simon & Schuster), translated into Thai, Chinese and Korean; and Keep It Moving (2019). She has said that The Creative Habit is about cybernetics, especially in the several Greek-themed creative exercises, such as the Coin Drop; the Coin Drop, as an exercise in extracting ordered meaning from chaos, is derived from the astrological muse Urania, in that random coins falling onto a flat surface can be used to develop pattern analysis skills. The astrological theme is an etymological underpinning of cybernetics' tradition of "guiding a boat" by sighting stellar references according to ancient Greek navigation.

== Works chronology ==
=== Dances/ballets/theatre ===
- Tank Dive 4/29/65
- Stage Show 7/7/65
- Stride 8/9/65
- Cede Blue Lake 12/1/65
- Unprocessed 12/1/65
- Re-Moves 10/18/66
- Twelve Foot Change 10/18/66
- One, Two, Three 2/2/67
- Jam 2/4/67
- Disperse 4/27/67
- Yancey Dance 7/1/67
- Three Page Sonata 7/6/67
- Forevermore 2/9/68
- Generation 2/9/68
- One Way 2/9/68
- Excess, Idle, Surplus 4/25/68
- Group Activities 1/13/69
- After Suite 2/2/69
- Medley 7/19/69
- Dancing In The Streets 11/11/69
- Sowing Of Seeds 6/7/70
- The Willie Smith Series 7/10/70
- Rose's Cross Country 8/1/70
- Fugue, The 8/1/70
- The One Hundreds 8/1/70
- 11-Minute Abstract, Repertory 1965-70 11/16/70
- The History of Up and Down, I and II 1/22/71
- Sunrise, Noon, Sundown 5/28/71
- Mozart Sonata K.545 8/1/71
- Eight Jelly Rolls 9/16/71
- Torelli 11/2/71
- Piano Rolls 11/7/71
- The Bix Pieces 4/14/71
- The Raggedy Dances 10/26/72
- Deuce Coupe (ballet) 2/8/73
- As Time Goes By 10/10/73
- In the Beginnings 1/26/74
- All About Eggs 2/1/74
- The Fugue on London Weekend Television 4/22/74
- Twyla Tharp and Eight Jelly Rolls 5/12/74
- Bach Duet 9/5/74
- Deuce Coupe II 2/1/75
- Sue's Leg 2/21/75
- The Double Cross 2/21/75
- Ocean's Motion 6/22/75
- Rags Suite Duet 9/10/75
- Push Comes To Shove 1/9/76
- Sue's Leg, Remembering the Thirties 3/24/76
- Give and Take 3/25/76
- Once More Frank 7/12/76
- Country Dances 9/4/76
- Happily Ever After 11/3/76
- After All 11/15/76
- Cacklin' Hen 2/14/77
- Fifty Ways To Leave Your Lover 5/12/77
- Mud 5/12/77
- Simon Medley 5/12/77
- The Hodge Podge 5/12/77
- 1903 2/2/79
- Chapters and Verses 2/2/79
- Baker's Dozen 2/15/79
- Three Dances From The Film "Hair" 2/15/79
- Three Fanfares 3/14/79
- Brahms Paganini 2/8/80
- Deuce Coupe III 2/8/80
- Assorted Quartets 7/29/80
- Third Suite 8/26/80
- Short Stories 8/27/80
- Uncle Edgar Dyed His Hair Red 2/28/81
- The Catherine Wheel 9/22/81 (music by David Byrne)
- Nine Sinatra Songs 10/15/82
- Bad Smells 10/15/82
- The Little Ballet 4/1/84
- Telemann 11/4/83
- Fait Accompli 11/8/83 (music by David Van Tieghem)
- "The Golden Section" 11/8/83 (music by David Byrne) (also filmed for PBS)
- Sinatra Suite 12/6/83
- Bach Partita 12/9/83
- Brahms/Handel (ballet), choreography by Tharp and Jerome Robbins 6/7/84
- Sorrow Floats 7/5/84
- Singin' in the Rain - Broadway 7/2/85
- In The Upper Room 8/28/86 (music by Philip Glass)
- Ballare 8/30/86
- The Catherine Wheel III 2/2/87
- Quartet 2/4/89
- Bum's Rush 2/8/89
- Rules of the Game 2/17/89
- Everlast 2/21/89
- Brief Fling 2/28/90
- Grand Pas: Rhythm of the Saints 10/1/91 (music by Paul Simon)
- Men's Piece 10/4/91
- Octet 10/4/91
- Sextet 1/30/92
- Cutting Up: A Dance Roadshow 11/27/93
- Bare Bones 11/27/93
- Pergolesi 6/4/93
- Demeter & Persephone 10/5/93
- Waterbaby Bagatelles 4/30/94
- "New Works" Twyla Tharp in Washington: Red, White & Blues" 9/13/94
- How Near Heaven 3/3/95
- Americans We 5/1/95
- Jump Start 5/1/95
- I Remember Clifford 8/9/95
- Mr. Worldly Wise 12/9/95
- The Elements 5/3/96
- Sweet Fields 9/20/96
- "66" 9/20/96
- Heroes 9/20/96
- Roy's Joys 8/18/97
- Story Teller, The 10/29/97
- Noir 1/30/98
- Yemaya 3/13/98
- Known By Heart Duet 8/6/98
- Diabelli 10/22/98
- Known By Heart 11/3/98
- The Junk Duet 11/3/98
- Grosse Sonate 7/1/98
- Beethoven Seventh 1/22/00
- The Brahms/Haydn Variations aka: Variations on a Theme by Haydn 3/21/00
- Mozart Clarinet Quintet K. 581 7/6/00
- Surfer At The River Styx 7/6/00
- Westerly Round 6/23/01
- Movin' Out - Chicago 6/25/02
- Movin' Out - New York 10/24/02
- Even The King 1/11/03
- Movin' Out - US Tour 1/27/04
- The Times They Are A-Changin' - California 2/9/06
- Catherine Wheel Suite 5/11/06
- The Times They Are A-Changin' - New York 10/26/06
- NIGHTSPOT 3/28/08
- Rabbit and Rogue 6/3/08 (music by Danny Elfman)
- Opus 111 9/25/08
- Afternoon Ball 9/25/08
- Come Fly With Me 9/23/09
- Come Fly Away 3/25/10
- Sinatra: Dance With Me - 12/11/10
- Armenia 4/23/11
- Come Fly Away Tour 8/3/11
- Scarlatti 10/13/11
- The Princess and The Goblin - Atlanta 2/10/12
- The Princess and the Goblin - Winnipeg 10/17/12
- Treefrog in Stonehenge 07/26/13
- Waiting at the Station 09/27/13
- Come Fly Away (Ballet) 09/28/13
- Beethoven Opus 130 2016
- Brel 2/13/2024
- The Ballet Master 2/13/2024

==== Collaborative work ====
- Brahms/Handel with Jerome Robbins 6/7/84
- In the Upper Room with Philip Glass 1986

== Filmography ==
- Hair 3/12/78
- Ragtime 1980
- Amadeus 9/19/84
- White Nights 12/6/85
- I'll Do Anything 1994

=== Video ===
- Scrapbook Tape 10/25/82
- The Catherine Wheel 3/1/83
- Baryshnikov by Tharp / Push Comes to Shove 10/5/84
- Twyla Tharp: Oppositions 4/24/96

=== Television ===
- The Bix Pieces (series of productions) 1973
- Making Television Dance 10/4/77
- Dance Is A Man's Sport Too 1980
- Confessions of a Cornermaker 10/13/81
- Catherine Wheel, PBS 3/1/83
- "The Golden Section" from Dance in America: Miami City Ballet 10/28/11

== Books ==
- Tharp, Twyla (December 1992), Push Comes to Shove, Bantam Books, ISBN 0553073060
- Tharp, Twyla (September 29, 2003), The Creative Habit: Learn It and Use It for Life, Simon & Schuster, ISBN 9780743235266
- Tharp, Twyla (November 24, 2009), The Collaborative Habit: Learn It and Use It for Life, Simon & Schuster, ISBN 9781416576518
- Tharp, Twyla (October 29, 2019), Keep It Moving: Lessons for the Rest of Your Life, Simon & Schuster, ISBN 9781982101305

== Honors and awards ==
Tharp has received two Emmy Awards, 19 honorary doctorates, the Vietnam Veterans of America President's Award, the 2004 National Medal of the Arts, and numerous grants, including a MacArthur Fellowship. She is a member of the American Academy of Arts and Sciences, the American Philosophical Society, and an Honorary Member of the American Academy of Arts and Letters.

At the 1982 Barnard College commencement ceremonies, Tharp's alma mater awarded her its highest honor, the Barnard Medal of Distinction.

She received the Tony Award for Best Choreography and the Drama Desk Award for Outstanding Choreography for Movin' Out. She received a Drama Desk nomination for Outstanding Choreography for Singin' in the Rain.

Tharp was named a Kennedy Center Honoree for 2008. She was inducted into the Academy of Achievement in 1993.

From 2013 to 2014, the Smithsonian National Portrait Gallery featured Tharp in the critically acclaimed "Dancing the Dream" exhibition as a pioneer of American modern dance.

On May 24, 2018, she was awarded the Doctor of Arts degree by Harvard University.

In 2025 she was awarded the Golden Lion for Lifetime Achievement by Biennale Danza at the Venice Biennale.

=== Awards by year ===
1965

- Walter Gutman

1969

- George Irwin
- The Lepercq Foundation

1970

- Foundation for the Contemporary Performing Arts, 1970
- Guggenheim Foundation Fellowship, John S. Guggenheim Memorial Foundation
- The Emma A. Sheafer Trust, 1970–1981, 1985

1971

- John Simon Guggenheim Memorial Foundation, 1971, 1974
- National Endowment for the Arts Choreographers Fellowship, 1971, 1973
- New York State Council on the Arts Annual Support, 1971–1986

1972

- Brandeis University, Creative Arts Citation

1973

- National Endowment for the Arts Annual Support, 1973–1986

1974

- Creative Artists Public Service Program
- Edward John Nobel Foundation
- New York Public Library Dance Collection
- The Place Trust, London
- The Andrew W. Mellon Foundation, 1974–1978, 1982, 1983, 1986

1975

- Eight Jelly Rolls, 1st in Festival in Video and Modern Dance Video Certificate of Honor
- Making Television Dance, Modern Dance Video Certificate of Merit

1976

- Mademoiselle Magazine, Mademoiselle Magazine Award
- Exxon Corporation, 1976, 1980, 1982–1984, 1986

1977

- The Green Fund, 1977, 1980, 1981
- National Endowment for the Arts Challenge Grant, 1977, 1985
- The Shubert Foundation, 1977, 1978, 1980–1986

1978

- Dance Film Association, 7th Annual Dance Video and Film Festival
- Honorary Degree, California Institute of the Arts
- Silver Satellite Award for Making Television Dance, American Women in Radio & Television
- The Ford Foundation, 1978, 1980
- The Ford Motor Company, 1978–1985
- The Surdna Foundation, 1978, 1980, 1985

1979

- Soho Arts Second Annual Awards, The SoHo Weekly News
- Honorary Degree, Bucknell University
- The Scherman Foundation, 1979, 1980, 1982–1985
- United Artists
- The David Merrick Arts Foundation
- Mobil Foundation, Inc., 1979, 1981–1986

1980

- Honorary Degree, Bates College
- Dance Educators of America Award for Making Television Dance
- Screening and Red Ribbon Award for Making Television Dance
- The Booth Ferris Foundation
- Chase Manhattan Bank, 1980–1982
- Con Ed, 1980–1985
- Morgan Guarantee Trust, 1980–1981, 1983–1984, 1986
- The Jerome Robbins Foundation, 1980, 1983

1981

- Film Library Association American Film Festival
- Honorary Degree, Bard College
- Honorary Degree, Brown University
- Dance Magazine Award, Dance Magazine
- Dance Film Award for Making Television Dance, Chicago International Film Festival
- Indiana Arts Award, Indiana Arts Commission
- Citibank, 1981–1986
- Doll Foundation, 1981–1986
- Weil Foundation
- Norman and Rosita Winston Foundation
- Rockefeller Foundation

1982

- Medal of Distinction, Barnard College
- Chemical Bank, 1982–1986
- National Corporate Fund for Dance, 1982–1985
- Robert Sterling Clark Foundation
- Ida and William Rosenthal Foundation, 1982, 1986
- New York Telephone, 1982–1985

1983

- Spirit of Achievement Award, Albert Einstein College of Medicine
- Honorary Degree, Williams College
- Indiana Arts Award, Indiana Arts Commission
- The Thorne Foundation
- Lila Wallace-Reader's Digest Fund, 1983–1984, 1986
- C.L. Glazer Trust
- The Klingenstein Fund
- Warner Communications

1984

- Mayor's Award of Honor for Arts and Culture, Edward I. Koch, New York City
- Dance Masters of America 1984 Choreographer's Award
- Arthur Andersen and Company, 1984–1986
- Japan-U.S. Friendship Commission
- Booth Ferris Foundation
- Brooklyn Union and Gas
- Merrill Lynch, 1984, 1986
- New York Times Company Foundation, 1984–1986

1985

- Emmy Awards for Baryshnikov by Tharp choreography and co-direction, Academy of Television Arts and Sciences
- Directors Guild of America Award for Outstanding Directorial Achievement for Baryshnikov by Tharp
- Indiana Arts Award, Indiana Arts Commission
- APA Trucking
- The Charles Engelhard Foundation
- Corporate Property Investors
- Hausman Belding Foundation
- Gerald D. Hines Interests
- GFI/Knoll International
- NBC, 1985–1986
- Samuel I. Newhouse Foundation, 1985, 1986
- Zayre Corporation

1986

- University Medal of Excellence, Columbia University
- Bankers Trust
- Cadillac Fairview
- MCA
- Manufacturers Hanover Trust Company
- Ridgewood Energy Corporation

1987

- Honorary Degree, Indiana University
- Honorary Degree, Pomona College

1988

- Honorary Degree, Hamilton College
- Honorary Degree, Skidmore College

1989

- Honorary Degree, Marymount Manhattan College
- Lions of the Performing Arts Award, New York Public Library

1990

- Samuel M. Scripps Award, American Dance Festival

1991

- Laurence Olivier Award for In the Upper Room, Laurence Olivier Foundation
- Wexner Foundation Award, The Ohio State University Wexner Center for the Arts

1992

- MacArthur Fellowship, John D. and Catherine T. MacArthur Foundation
- Ruth Page Visiting Arts, Harvard University, 1992–1993

1993

- Golden Plate Award, American Academy of Achievement
- Woman of Achievement, Barnard College
- Inducted, American Academy of Arts and Sciences

1996

- Arts Award, Dickinson College
- Honorary Degree, Ball State University
- Distinguished Artist Award, International Society For The Performing Arts

1997

- American Honorary Member, American Academy of Arts and Letters

1998

- Trust for Mutual Understanding

1999

- MOCA Award to Distinguished Women In The Arts, Museum Of Contemporary Art

2000

- The Doris Duke Awards for New Work

2001

- Women's Project & Productions Exceptional Achievement Award

2002

- New York Awards Lifetime Achievement

2003

- Drama Desk Award Outstanding Choreography: Movin' Out
- Tony Award Best Choreography: Movin' Out
- Drama League Outstanding Achievement Award for Musical Theatre
- TDF/Astaire Award Best Choreographer: Movin' Out
- Indiana Living Legend, Indiana Historical Society
- Glamour Woman of the Year Award
- Outstanding Contribution to the Arts Award North Carolina School of the Arts
- Honorary Doctorate, North Carolina School of the Arts

2004

- National Medal of Arts
- Vietnam Veterans of America President's Award for Excellence in the Arts
- Independent Reviewers of New England Award Best Choreography: Movin' Out. Broadway in Boston
- Goddard Space Flight Center's Center Director's Colloquium Citation for Enlightening, Creative and Thought-Provoking Presentation

2005

- Best Choreography: Movin' Out. Touring Broadway Awards
- Jane Addams Medal for Distinguished Service presented by Rockford College

2006

- Princess Grace Award – Outstanding Artistry
- Critics Circle Dance Award Outstanding Choreography: Movin' Out. London

2007

- Honorary Degree, Duke University, Durham, North Carolina
- Honorary Degree, Princeton University, Princeton, NJ
- Touring Broadway Award: Best Choreography for a touring show for Movin' Out

2008

- The Jerome Robbins Prize
- The Kennedy Center Honors
- Woman of the Year Award, presented by Nevada State Ballet

2009

- U.S. News & World Report: listed on "America's Best Leaders"
- Leadership at Harvard University's Kennedy School of Government

2010

- The IAL Diamond Award for Achievement in the Arts, presented by Columbia University's The Varsity Show
- The Drama Desk Award for Outstanding Choreographer: Come Fly Away
- Lifetime Achievement Award, presented by The American Academy of Hospitality Sciences
- Suzi Bass Award for Best Choreography: "Come Fly With Me"
- Rolex Dance Award

2011

- The Vasterling Award, Presented by Nashville Ballet
- Honorary Degree, The Juilliard School, New York, NY
- TITAS Award for Contributions to the Arts
- Woman of Achievement Award, Meredith College
- Spotlight Award, Presented by Hubbard Street Dance Chicago

2013

- Lifetime Achievement Award, presented by Tribeca Film Festival

2014

- 62nd Capezio Dance Award
- Honorary Degree, University of Southern California, Los Angeles, CA

== Personal life ==
Until 1972 Tharp was married to painter Robert Huot, by whom she has a son, Jesse Huot, who acts as her business manager. She also has a grandson.

== See also ==
- List of dancers

== General and cited sources ==
- Siegel, Marcia B (2006). Howling Near Heaven. New York: St. Martin's Press.
- Tharp, Twyla (1992). Push Comes to Shove: An Autobiography. New York: Bantam. ISBN 978-0553073065.
