= Cross-stringing =

Piano string arrangement

Cross-stringing (sometimes called overstringing) is a method of arranging piano strings inside the case of a piano so that the strings are placed in a vertically overlapping slanted arrangement, with two heights of bridges on the soundboard instead of just one. This permits larger, but not necessarily longer, strings to fit within the case of the piano. The invention of cross-stringing in the 1820s is variously credited to Alpheus Babcock and Jean-Henri Pape. The first use of the patent in grand pianos in the United States was by Henry Steinway Jr. in 1859. In the late 19th century, cross-stringing gradually took the place of straight-stringing, in which all the strings are perpendicular to the keyboard and do not overlap.

The advantages of cross-stringing is that the case of the piano can be smaller, the bass strings can be longer and the placement of the bass strings is in the center of the piano case, where they receive more resonance than when placed at the side.

Cross-stringing used to be criticized by some as producing a "murky" sound due to the sustain pedal being used improperly, but that was addressed by learning how to use the sustain pedal properly. According to pianist Gwendolyn Mok, "If you look inside your own piano, you will notice that the strings are all crossing each other. With the straight strung piano you get distinct registral differences—almost like listening to a choir where you have the bass, tenor, alto, and soprano voices. It is very clear and there is no blending or homogenizing of the sound."

Some Challen pianos made in the 1920s are "double overstrung", where the strings are at 3 different heights and cross over in 2 different locations.
