= Henry S. Parmelee =

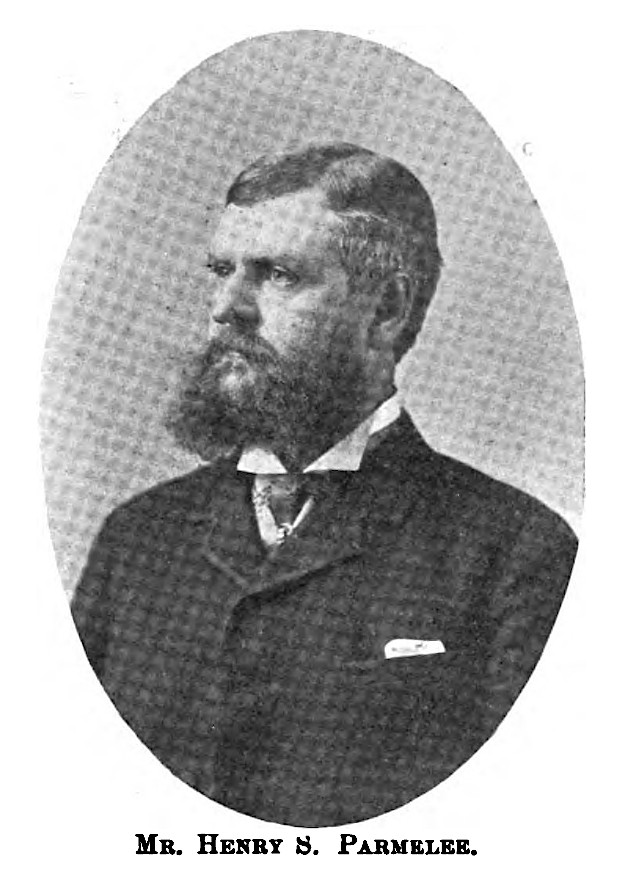

Henry S. Parmelee (c. 1846 – 1902), president of the Fair Haven and Westville Street Railway Company, was a piano maker from New Haven, Connecticut. He took the idea of Sir Hiram Maxim and then invented the second automatic fire sprinkler system in 1874, to protect his piano factory. While other patents for fire sprinklers predated Parmelee's work, he is credited with the first automated sprinkler head. His piano company, Mathushek Piano Manufacturing Co., is credited as having the first building in the United States to be equipped with a fire suppression system.

== Biography ==
He was born in about 1846 in Ohio to Spencer T. Parmelee (c. 1805–1875) and his wife Zeriah A. (born c. 1812). He died in 1902.
