= Challen =

Challen is a surname. Notable people with the surname include:

- Albert Charles Challen (1847–1881), British artist
- Charles Challen (1894–1960), British barrister and politician
- Charles Challen (cricketer) (1790-?), English first-class cricketer
- Colin Challen (born 1953), British politician
- Craig Challen (born 1965/1966), Australian technical diver and cave explorer
- James Challen senior (fl. 1840s), English cricketer
- James Challen junior (1825–1900), English cricketer
- John Challen (1863–1937), Welsh amateur sportsman who played first-class cricket and association football
- Michael Challen (born 1932), Australian Anglican bishop
- William Challen (1786-?), English first-class cricketer

== See also ==
- Challen (given name)
