= Piano =

Keyboard instrument

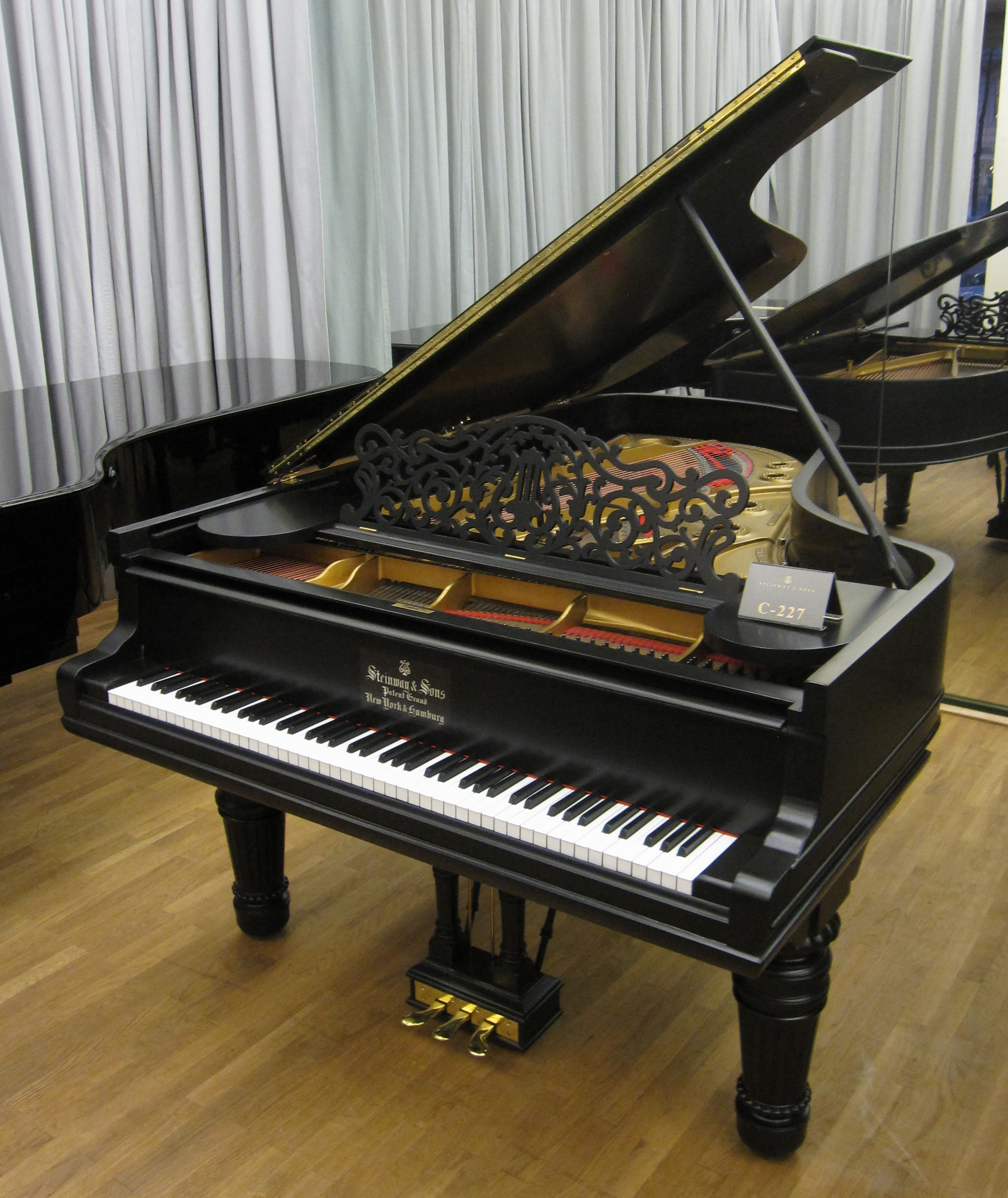
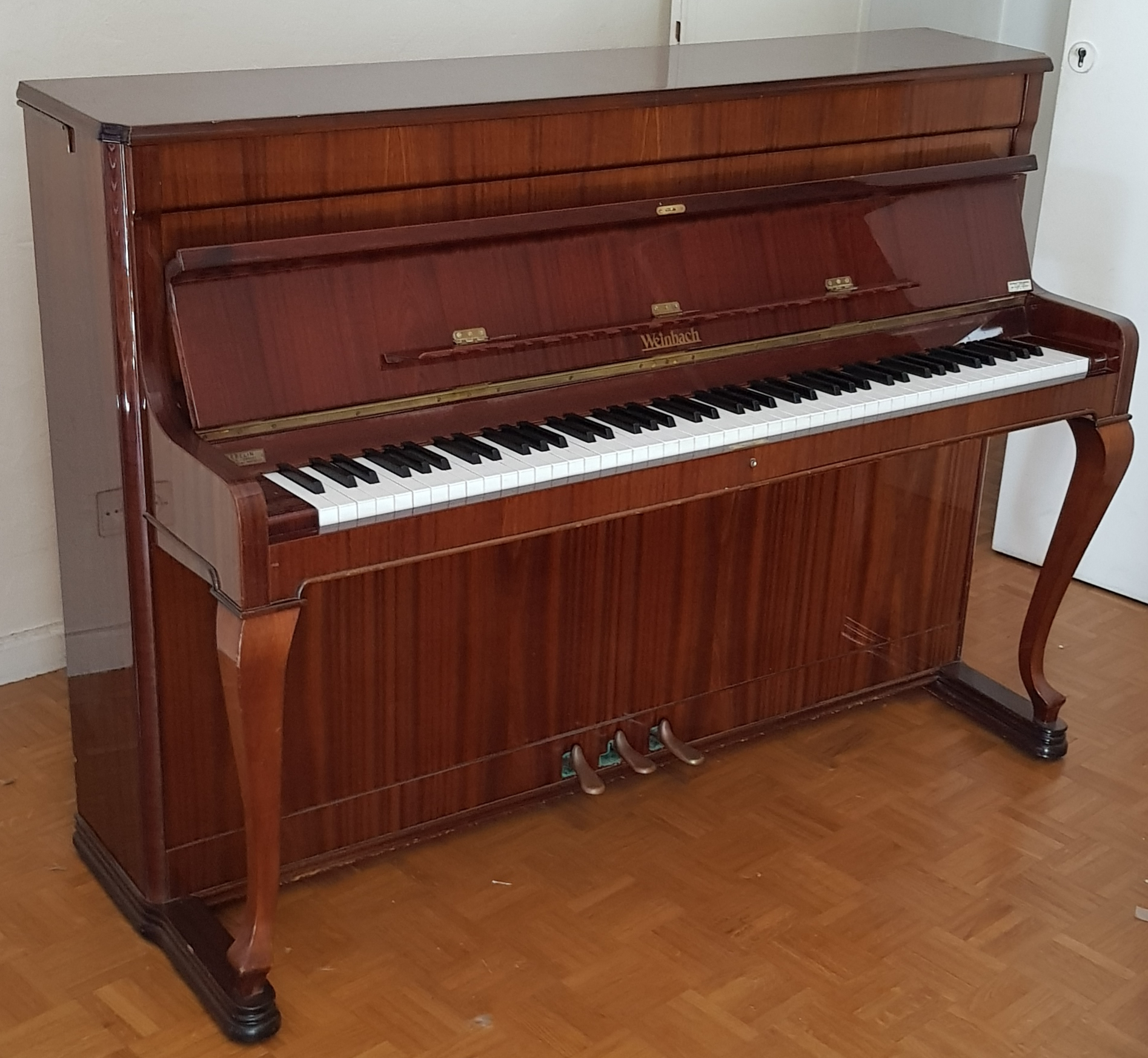
- A grand piano An upright piano

Keyboard instrument
- Hornbostel–Sachs classification: 314.122-4-8 (Simple chordophone with keyboard sounded by hammers)
- Inventor: Bartolomeo Cristofori
- Developed: Early 18th century

Playing range
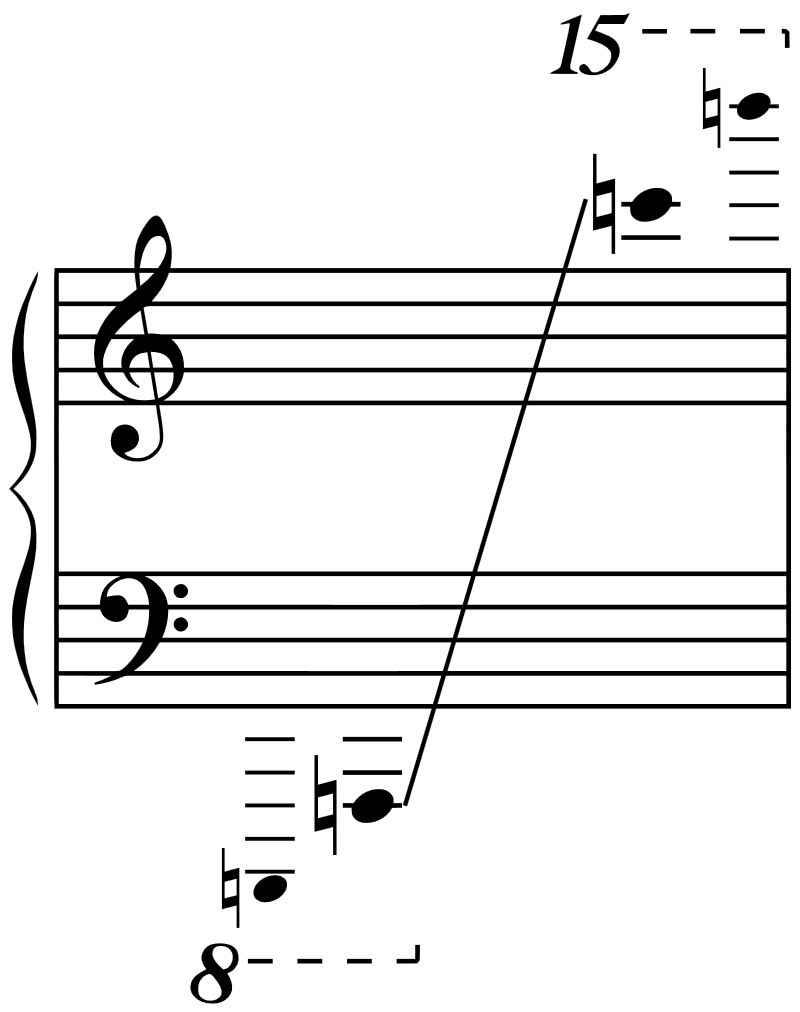

The Well-Tempered Clavier, first prelude of Book I
Played by Kimiko Douglass-Ishizaka

A piano is a keyboard instrument that produces sound when its keys are pressed, activating an action mechanism where hammers strike strings. Modern pianos have a row of 88 black and white keys—with the exception of the Bosendörfer and Stuart & Sons pianos—and tuned to a chromatic scale in equal temperament. A musician who specializes in piano is called a pianist.

There are two main types of piano: the grand piano and the upright piano. The grand piano offers better sound and more precise key control, making it the preferred choice when space and budget allow. The grand piano is also considered a necessity in venues hosting skilled pianists. The upright piano is more commonly used because of its smaller size and lower cost.

When a key is depressed, the strings inside are struck by felt-coated wooden hammers. The vibrations are transmitted through a bridge to a soundboard that amplifies the sound by coupling the acoustic energy to the air. When the key is released, a damper stops the string's vibration, ending the sound. Most notes have three strings, except for the bass, which graduates from one to two. Notes can be sustained when the keys are released by the use of pedals at the base of the instrument, which lift the dampers off the strings. The sustain pedal allows pianists to connect and overlay sound, and achieve expressive and colorful sonority.

In the 19th century, influenced by Romantic music trends, the fortepiano underwent changes such as the use of a cast iron frame, which allowed much greater string tensions. Aliquot stringing gave grand pianos a more powerful sound, a longer sustain, and a richer tone. Later in the century, as the piano became more common it allowed families to listen to a newly published musical piece by having a family member play a simplified version.

The piano is widely employed in classical, jazz, traditional and popular music for solo and ensemble performances, accompaniment, and for composing, songwriting and rehearsals. Despite its weight and cost, the piano's versatility, the extensive training of musicians, and its availability in venues, schools, and rehearsal spaces have made it a familiar instrument in the Western world.

== History ==
The piano was based on earlier technological innovations in struck-string instruments and keyboard instruments. The earliest known keyboard instrument was the Ancient Greek hydraulis, a type of pipe organ invented in the third century BC. Pipe organs continued to be used in Europe through the middle ages, and as such the development of pipe organs enabled instrument builders to learn about creating keyboard mechanisms for sounding pitches. The first string instruments with struck strings were the hammered dulcimers, which originated in the Middle East and were introduced in Europe in the Middle ages. During the Middle Ages, there were several attempts at creating stringed keyboard instruments with struck strings. By the 17th century, the mechanisms of keyboard instruments such as the clavichord and the harpsichord were well developed. In a clavichord the strings are struck by tangents, while in a harpsichord they are mechanically plucked by quills when the performer depresses the key. Centuries of work on the mechanism of the harpsichord in particular had shown instrument builders the most effective ways to construct the case, soundboard, bridge, and mechanical action for a keyboard intended to sound strings.

The English word piano is a shortened form of the Italian pianoforte, derived from gravecembalo col piano e forte ("harpsichord with soft and loud"). Variations in volume (loudness) are produced in response to the pianist's touch (pressure on the keys): the greater the pressure, the greater the force of the hammer hitting the strings and the louder the sound produced and the stronger the attack. Invented in 1700, the fortepiano was the second keyboard instrument (the first being the clavichord) to allow gradations of volume and tone according to how forcefully or softly the player presses or strikes the keys, unlike the pipe organ and harpsichord.

=== Invention ===
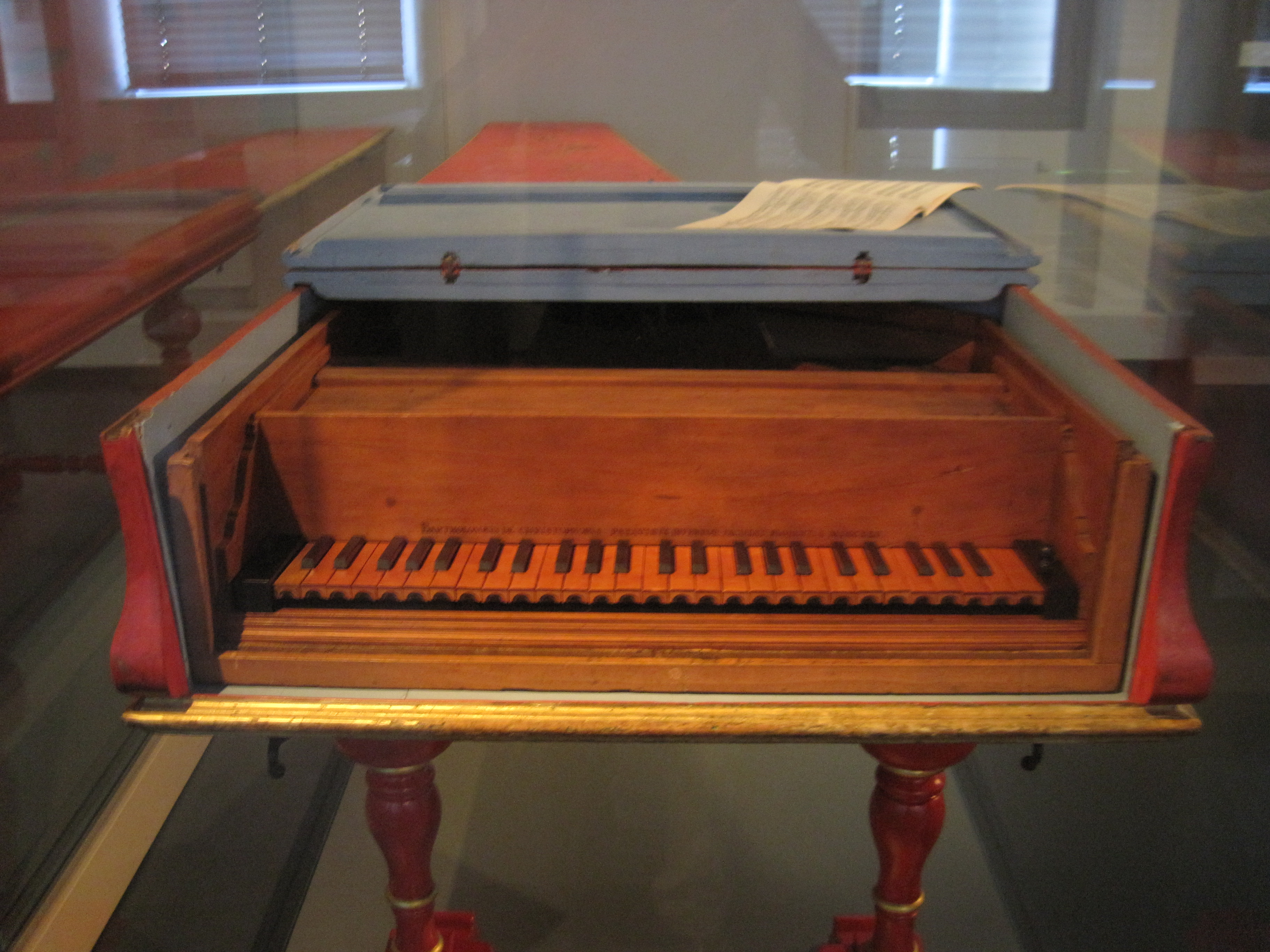
The 1726 Cristofori piano in the Musikinstrumenten-Museum in Leipzig

The invention of the piano is credited to Bartolomeo Cristofori of Padua, Italy, who was employed by Ferdinando de' Medici, Grand Prince of Tuscany, as the Keeper of the Instruments. Cristofori was an expert harpsichord maker and was well acquainted with the body of knowledge on stringed keyboard instruments. This knowledge of keyboard mechanisms and actions helped him to develop the first pianos. It is not known when Cristofori first built a piano. An inventory made by his employers, the Medici family, indicates the existence of a piano by 1700. The three Cristofori pianos that survive today date from the 1720s. Cristofori named the instrument un cimbalo di cipresso di piano e forte ("a keyboard of cypress with soft and loud"), abbreviated over time as pianoforte, fortepiano, and later reduced to only piano.

Cristofori's great success was designing a stringed keyboard instrument in which the notes are struck by a hammer. The hammer must strike the string but not remain in contact with it, because continued contact would damp the sound and stop the string from vibrating and making sound. This means that after striking the string, the hammer must quickly fall from (or rebound from) the strings. The hammer must return to its rest position without bouncing violently, thus preventing notes from being re-played by accidental rebound. It must return to a position in which it is ready to play again almost immediately after its key is depressed, so the player can repeat the same note rapidly when desired. Cristofori's piano action was a model for the many approaches to piano actions that followed in the next century.

Cristofori's early instruments were made with thin strings and were much quieter than the modern piano, though they were louder and had more sustain compared to the clavichord—the only previous keyboard instrument capable of dynamic nuance responding to the player's touch, the velocity with which the keys are pressed. While the clavichord allows expressive control of volume and sustain, it is relatively quiet even at its loudest. The harpsichord produces a sufficiently loud sound, especially when a coupler joins each key to both manuals of a two-manual harpsichord, but it offers no dynamic or expressive control over individual notes. The piano in some sense offers the best of both of the older instruments, combining the ability to play at least as loudly as a harpsichord with the ability to continuously vary dynamics by touch.

=== Early fortepiano ===
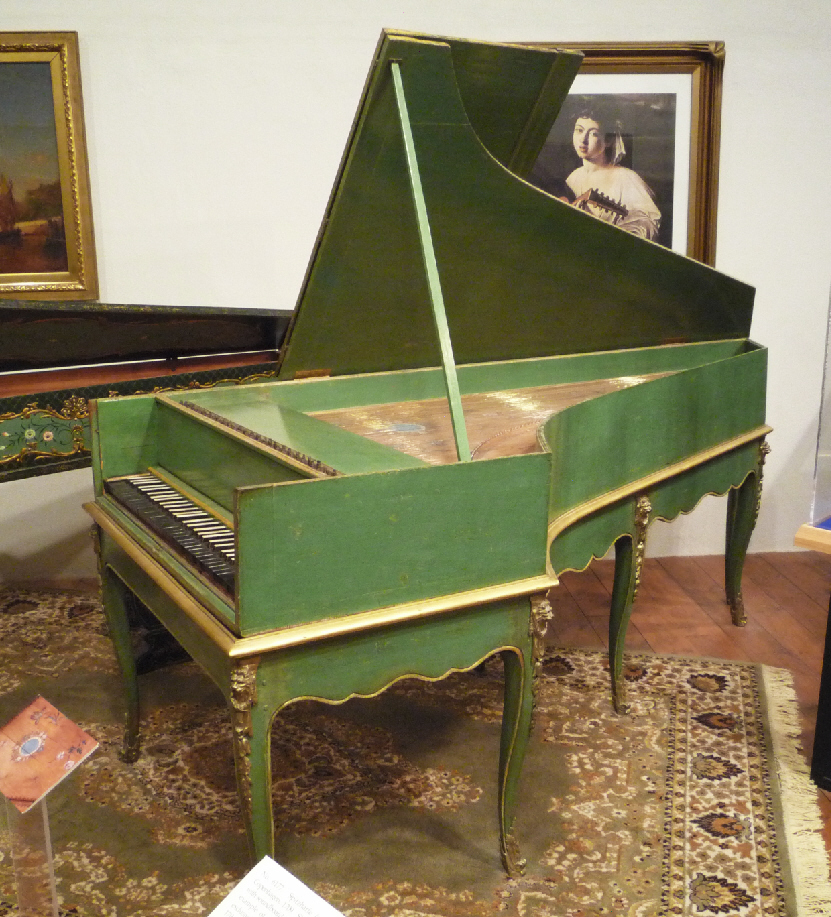
A grand piano by Louis Bas of Villeneuve-lès-Avignon, 1781. Earliest French grand piano known to survive; includes an inverted wrestplank and action derived from the work of Bartolomeo Cristofori (c. 1700) with ornately decorated soundboard.

Cristofori's new instrument remained relatively unknown until an Italian writer, Scipione Maffei, wrote an enthusiastic article about it in 1711, including a diagram of the mechanism, that was translated into German and widely distributed. Most of the next generation of piano builders started their work based on reading this article. One of these builders was Gottfried Silbermann, better known as an organ builder. Silbermann's pianos were virtual copies of Cristofori's, with one important addition: Silbermann invented the forerunner of the modern sustain pedal, which lifts all the dampers from the strings simultaneously. This innovation allows the pianist to sustain the notes that they have depressed even after their fingers are no longer pressing down the keys. As such, by holding a chord with the sustain pedal, pianists can relocate their hands to a different register of the keyboard in preparation for a subsequent section.

Silbermann showed Johann Sebastian Bach one of his early instruments in the 1730s, but Bach did not like the instrument at that time, saying that the higher notes were too soft to allow a full dynamic range. Although this earned him some animosity from Silbermann, the criticism was apparently heeded. Bach did approve of a later instrument he saw in 1747 and even served as an agent in selling Silbermann's pianos. "Instrument: piano et forte genandt"—a reference to the instrument's ability to play soft and loud—was an expression that Bach used to help sell the instrument when he was acting as Silbermann's agent in 1749.

Piano making flourished during the late 18th century in the Viennese school, which included Johann Andreas Stein (who worked in Augsburg, Germany) and the Viennese makers Nannette Streicher (daughter of Stein) and Anton Walter. Viennese-style pianos were built with wood frames, two strings per note, and leather-covered hammers. Some of these Viennese pianos had the opposite coloring of modern-day pianos; the natural keys were black and the accidental keys white. It was for such instruments that Wolfgang Amadeus Mozart composed his concertos and sonatas, and replicas of them are built in the 21st century for use in authentic-instrument performance of his music. The pianos of Mozart's day had a softer tone than modern pianos (those from the late 19th century or later) or English pianos, with less sustaining power. The term fortepiano now distinguishes these early instruments (and modern re-creations) from later pianos.

=== Further developments ===
Comparison of piano sound
19th century piano sound
Frédéric Chopin's Étude Op. 25, No. 12, on an Erard piano made in 1851

Modern piano sound
The same piece, on a modern piano

In the period from about 1790 to 1860, the Mozart-era piano underwent significant changes that led to the modern structure of the instrument. This revolution was in response to a preference by composers and pianists for a more powerful, sustained piano sound, which was made possible by the ongoing Industrial Revolution with resources such as high-quality piano wire for strings and precision casting for the production of massive iron frames that could withstand the tremendous tension of the strings. Over time, the tonal range of the piano was also increased from the five octaves of Mozart's day to the seven octave (or more) range found on today's pianos.

Early technological progress in the late 18th century owed much to the firm of Broadwood. John Broadwood joined with another Scot, Robert Stodart, and a Dutchman, Americus Backers, to design a piano in the harpsichord case—the origin of the "grand". This was achieved by about 1777. They quickly gained a reputation for the splendour and powerful tone of their instruments, with Broadwood constructing pianos that were progressively larger, louder, and more robustly constructed.

They sent pianos to both Joseph Haydn and Ludwig van Beethoven, and were the first firm to build pianos with a range of more than five octaves: five octaves and a fifth during the 1790s, six octaves by 1810 (Beethoven used the extra notes in his later works), and seven octaves by 1820. The Viennese makers similarly followed these trends. The two schools used different piano actions: Broadwoods used a more robust action, whereas Viennese instruments were more sensitive.

By the 1820s, the center of piano innovation had shifted to Paris, where the Pleyel firm manufactured pianos used by Frédéric Chopin, and the Érard firm manufactured those used by Franz Liszt. In 1821, Sébastien Érard invented the double escapement action, which incorporated a repetition lever (also called the balancier) that permitted repeating a note even if the key had not return to its resting position. This facilitated rapid playing of repeated notes, a musical device exploited by Liszt. When the invention became public, as revised by Henri Herz, the double escapement action gradually became standard in grand pianos and is still incorporated into all grand pianos currently produced in the 2000s.

Other improvements of the mechanism included the use of firm felt hammer coverings instead of layered leather or cotton. Felt, which Jean-Henri Pape was the first to use in pianos in 1826, was a more consistent material, permitting wider dynamic ranges as hammer weights and string tension increased. The sostenuto pedal (see below), invented in 1844 by Jean-Louis Boisselot and copied by the Steinway firm in 1874, allowed for a wider range of effects.

Broadwood square action

Erard square action

One innovation that helped create the powerful sound of the modern piano was the use of a massive, strong, cast iron frame. Also called the "plate", the iron frame sits atop the soundboard, and serves as the primary bulwark against the force of string tension that can exceed 20 tons (180 kilonewtons) in total for a modern grand piano. The single piece cast iron frame for square piano was patented in 1825 in Boston by Alpheus Babcock. Combining the metal hitch pin plate was patented in 1821, claimed by Broadwood on behalf of Samuel Hervé. Resisting bars were added by Thom and Allen in 1820, but also claimed by Broadwood and Érard. Babcock later worked for the Chickering & Mackays firm, who patented the first full iron frame for grand pianos in 1843.

Composite forged metal frames were preferred by many European makers until the American system was fully adopted by the early 20th century. The increased structural integrity of the iron frame allowed the use of thicker, tenser, and more numerous strings. In 1834, the Webster & Horsfal firm of Birmingham brought out a form of piano wire made from cast steel. It was "so superior to the iron wire that the English firm soon had a monopoly." A better steel wire was developed in 1840 by the Viennese firm Martin Miller, and a period of innovation and intense competition ensued, with rival brands of piano wire being tested against one another at international competitions, leading ultimately to the modern form of piano wire.

Several important advances included changes to the way the piano was strung. There is one string for each note in the bass, two for each note in the tenor, and three for each note in the treble. The use of a Capo d’Astro bar instead of agraffes in the uppermost treble allowed the hammers to strike the strings in their optimal position, greatly increasing that area's power. The implementation of over-stringing, also called cross-stringing, in which the strings are placed in two separate planes, each with its own bridge height, allowed greater length to the bass strings and optimized the transition from unwound tenor strings to the iron or copper-wound bass strings. Over-stringing was invented by Pape during the 1820s and first patented for use in grand pianos in the United States by Henry Steinway Jr. in 1859.

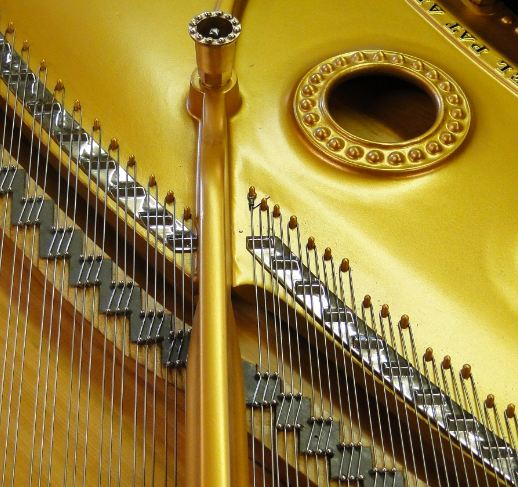
Duplex scaling of an 1883 Steinway Model 'A'. From lower left to upper right: main sounding length of strings, treble bridge, duplex string length, duplex bar (nickel-plated bar parallel to bridge), hitchpins, plate strut with bearing bolt, plate hole

Some piano makers added variations to enhance the tone of each note, such as Pascal Taskin (1788), Collard & Collard (1821), and Julius Blüthner, who developed Aliquot stringing in 1893. These systems were used to strengthen the tone of the highest register of notes on the piano, which up until this time were viewed as being too weak-sounding. Each used more distinctly ringing, undamped vibrations of sympathetically vibrating strings to add to the tone, except the Blüthner Aliquot stringing, which uses an additional fourth string in the upper two treble sections.

While the hitchpins of these separately suspended Aliquot strings are raised slightly above the level of the usual tri-choir strings, they are not struck by the hammers but rather are damped by attachments of the usual dampers. Eager to copy these effects, Theodore Steinway invented duplex scaling, which used short lengths of non-speaking wire bridged by the "aliquot" throughout much of the upper range of the piano, always in locations that caused them to vibrate sympathetically in conformity with their respective overtones—typically in doubled octaves and twelfths.

=== Variations in shape and design ===
Some early pianos had shapes and designs that are no longer in use. The square piano, not truly square, but rectangular, was cross strung at an extremely acute angle above the hammers, with the keyboard set along the long side. This design is attributed to Christian Ernst Friderici, a pupil of Gottfried Silbermann, in Germany and Johannes Zumpe in England, and it was improved by changes first introduced by Guillaume-Lebrecht Petzold in France and Alpheus Babcock in the United States.

Square pianos were built in great numbers until the 1840s in Europe and the 1890s in the United States, and saw the most visible change of any type of piano: the iron-framed, over-strung squares manufactured by Steinway & Sons were more than two-and-a-half times the size of Zumpe's wood-framed instruments from a century before. Their overwhelming popularity was the result of inexpensive construction and price, although their tone and performance were limited by narrow soundboards, simple actions and string spacing that made proper hammer alignment difficult.

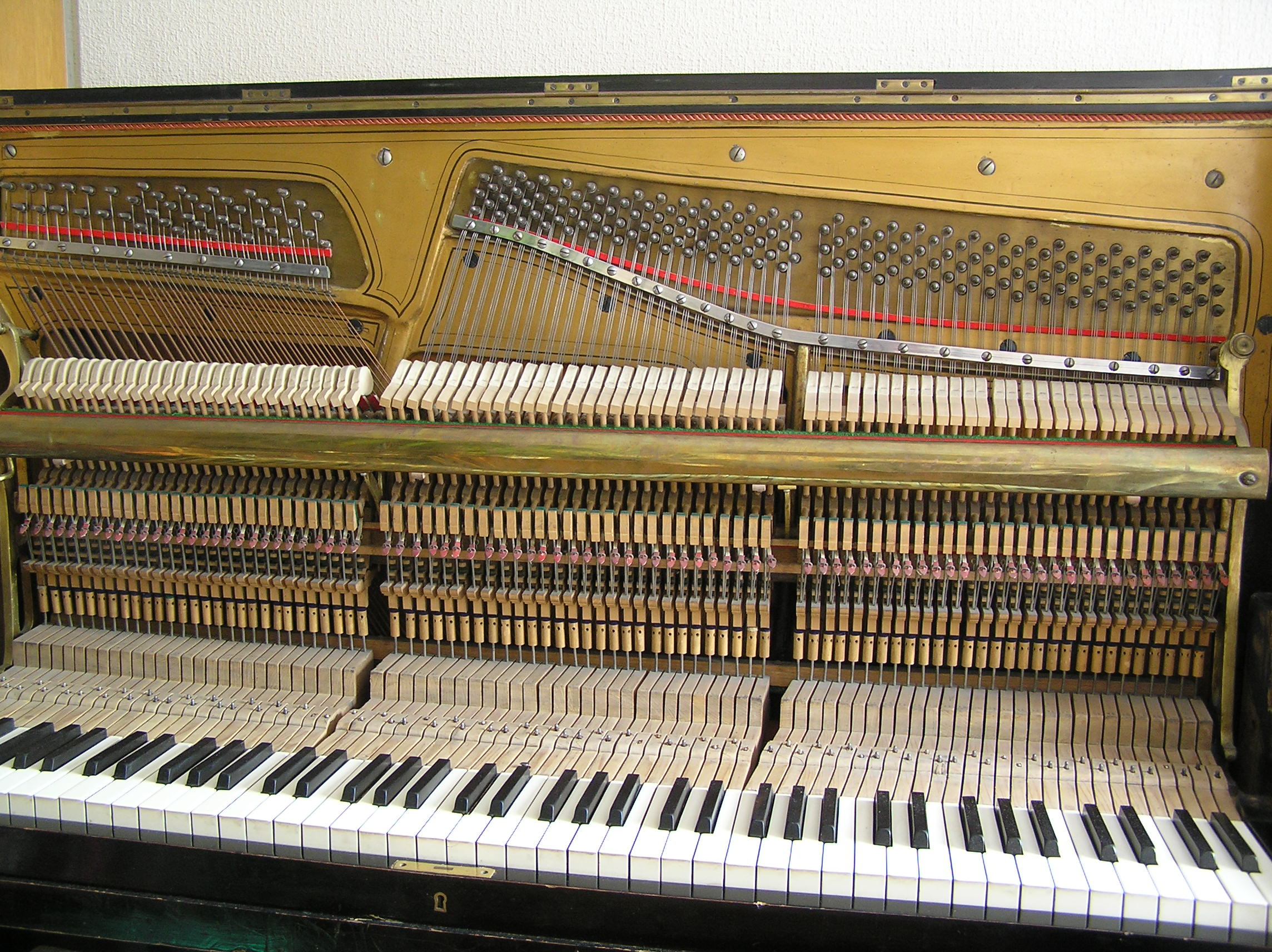
The mechanism and strings in upright pianos are perpendicular to the keys. The cover for the strings is removed for this photo.

The tall, vertically strung upright grand was arranged like a grand set on end, with the soundboard and bridges above the keys and tuning pins below them. "Giraffe pianos", "pyramid pianos" and "lyre pianos" were arranged in a somewhat similar fashion, using evocatively shaped cases. The very tall cabinet piano was introduced about 1805 and was built until the 1840s. It had strings arranged vertically on a continuous frame with bridges extended nearly to the floor, behind the keyboard and very large sticker action.

The short cottage upright or pianino with vertical stringing—made popular by Robert Wornum around 1815—was built into the 20th century. They are informally called birdcage pianos because of their prominent damper mechanism. The oblique upright, popularized in France by Roller & Blanchet during the late 1820s, was diagonally strung throughout its compass. The tiny spinet upright was manufactured from the mid-1930s until recent times. The low position of the hammers required the use of a "drop action" to preserve a reasonable keyboard height.

Modern upright and grand pianos attained their present, 2000-era forms by the end of the 19th century. While improvements have been made in manufacturing processes, and many individual details of the instrument continue to receive attention, and a small number of acoustic pianos in the 2010s are produced with MIDI recording and digital sound module-triggering capabilities, the 19th century was the era of the most dramatic innovations and modifications of the instrument.

== Types ==
Modern pianos have two basic configurations, the grand piano and the upright piano, with various styles of each. There are also specialized and novelty pianos, electric pianos based on electromechanical designs, electronic pianos that synthesize piano-like tones using oscillators, and digital pianos using digital samples of acoustic piano sounds.

=== Grand ===
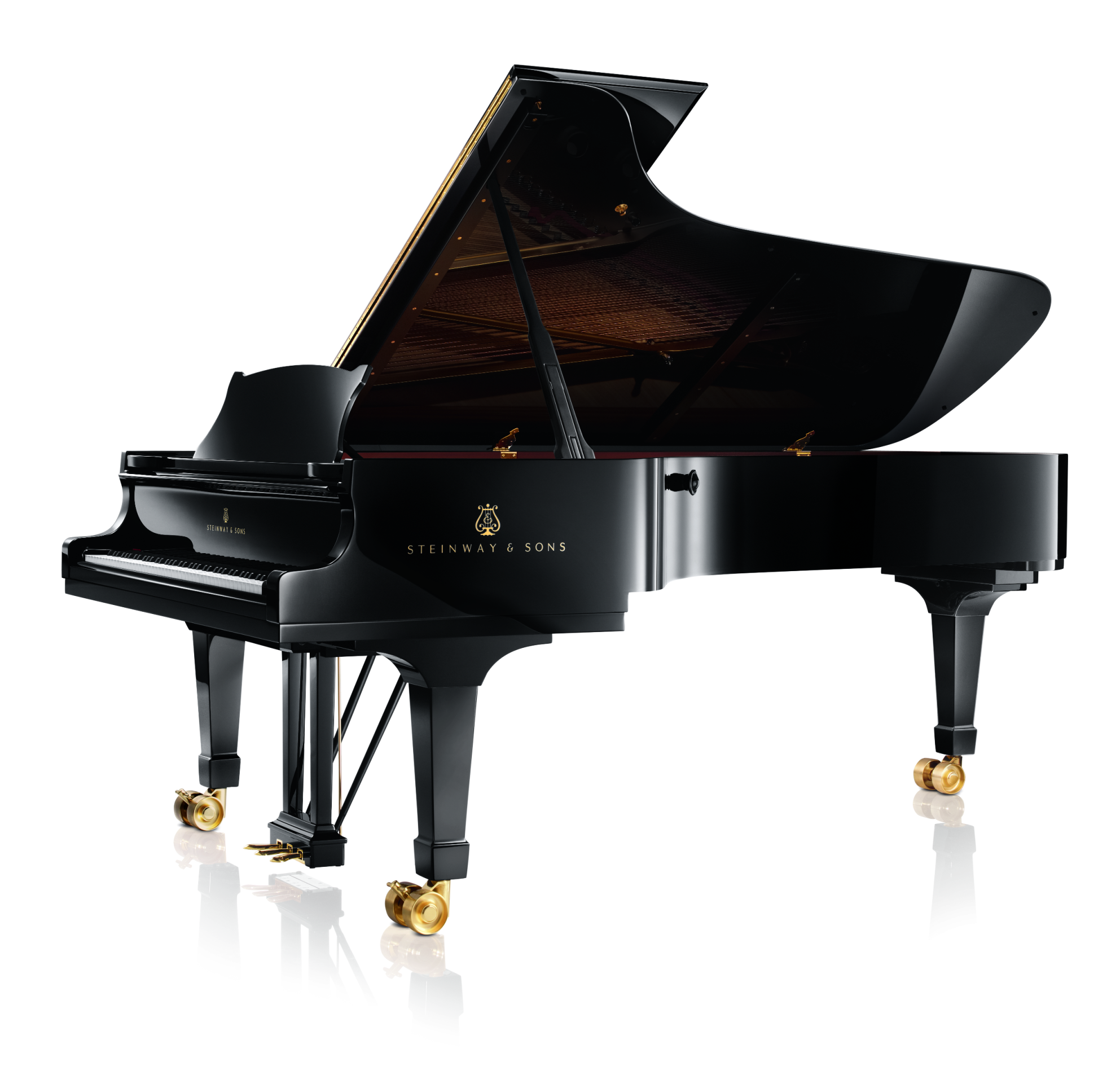
A Steinway & Sons model D-274 concert grand piano

In a grand piano, the frame and strings are horizontal, with the strings extending away from the keyboard. The action lies beneath the strings and uses gravity as its means of return to a state of rest. Grand pianos range in length from approximately 1.5 to 3 m (4 ft 11 in to 9 ft 10 in). Some of the lengths have been given more-or-less customary names, which vary from time to time and place to place, but might include:

- Baby grand – around 1.5 m (4 ft 11 in)
- Parlor grand or boudoir grand – 1.7 to 2.2 m (5 ft 7 in to 7 ft 3 in)
- Concert grand – 2.2 to 3 m (7 ft 3 in to 9 ft 10 in)

All else being equal, longer pianos with longer strings have larger, richer sound and lower inharmonicity of the strings. Inharmonicity is the degree to which the frequencies of overtones, known as partials or harmonics, sound sharp relative to whole multiples of the fundamental frequency. This results from the piano's considerable string stiffness. As a struck string decays, its harmonics vibrate from a point very slightly from its termination toward the center, or more flexible part of the string.

The inharmonicity may also result from imperfections within the string, such as rust on plain strings and dirt in the windings of bass strings. The higher the partial, the further sharp it runs. Pianos with shorter and thicker strings, typically small pianos with short string scales, have more inharmonicity. The greater the inharmonicity, the more the ear perceives it as harshness of tone.

The inharmonicity of piano strings requires that octaves be stretched, or tuned to a lower octave's corresponding sharp overtone rather than to a theoretically correct octave. If octaves are not stretched, single octaves sound in tune, but double—and notably triple—octaves are unacceptably narrow. Stretching a small piano's octaves to match its inherent inharmonicity level creates an imbalance among all the instrument's intervallic relationships.

In a concert grand, the octave "stretch" retains harmonic balance, even when aligning treble notes to a harmonic produced from three octaves below. This lets close and widespread octaves sound pure, and produces virtually beatless perfect fifths. This gives the concert grand a brilliant, singing and sustaining tone quality—one of the principal reasons that full-size grands are used in the concert hall. Smaller grands satisfy the space and cost needs of domestic use. They are used in some small teaching studios and smaller performance venues.

=== Upright ===
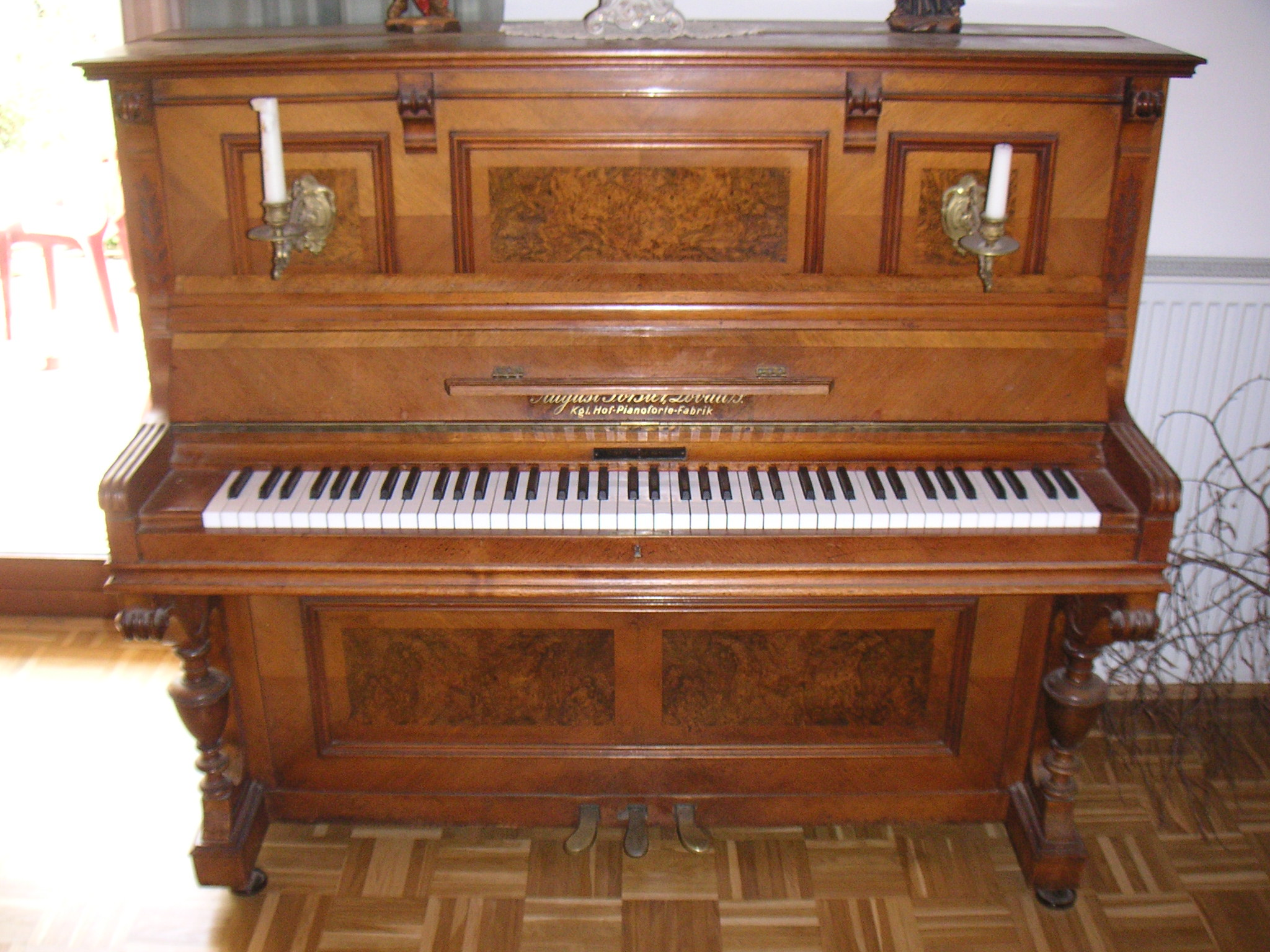
An August Förster upright piano

Upright pianos, also called vertical pianos, are more compact with a vertical structure of the frame and strings. The mechanical action structure of the upright piano was invented in London in 1826 by Robert Wornum, and upright models became the most popular model for domestic use. Upright pianos take up less space than a grand piano and as such are a better size for use in private homes for domestic music-making and practice. The hammers move horizontally and return to their resting position via springs, which are susceptible to degradation.

Upright pianos with unusually tall frames and long strings were sometimes marketed as upright grand pianos, but that label is misleading. Some authors classify modern pianos according to their height and to modifications of the action that are necessary to accommodate the height. Upright pianos are generally less expensive than grand pianos. Upright pianos are widely used in churches, community centers, schools, music conservatories and university music programs as rehearsal and practice instruments. They are popular models for in-home purchase.

- The top of a spinet model barely rises above the keyboard. Unlike all other pianos, the spinet action is located below the keys, operated by vertical wires that are attached to the backs of the keys.
- Console pianos, which have a compact action, with shorter hammers than a large upright has. Because the console's action is above the keys rather than below them as in a spinet, a console almost always plays better than a spinet does. Console pianos are a few inches shorter than studio models.
- Studio pianos are around 107 to 114 cm (42–45 in) tall. This is the shortest cabinet that can accommodate a full-sized action located above the keyboard.
- Anything taller than a studio piano is called an upright. Technically, any piano with a vertically oriented soundboard could be called an upright, but that word is often reserved for the full-size models.

=== Specialized ===
A Steinway player piano from 1920. Harold Bauer performing Saint-Saëns' Piano Concerto No. 2, excerpt of 3rd movement. Duo-Art recording 5973-4.

The toy piano, introduced in the 19th century, is a small piano-like instrument that generally uses round metal rods to produce sound, rather than strings. The US Library of Congress recognizes the toy piano as a unique instrument with the subject designation, Toy Piano Scores: M175 T69.

In 1863, Henri Fourneaux invented the player piano, which plays itself from a piano roll. A machine perforates a performance recording into rolls of paper, and the player piano replays the performance using pneumatic devices. Modern equivalents of the player piano include the Bösendorfer CEUS, Yamaha Disklavier and QRS Pianomation, using solenoids and MIDI rather than pneumatics and rolls.

A silent piano is an acoustic piano having an option to silence the strings by means of an interposing hammer bar. They are designed for private silent practice, to avoid disturbing others.

In 1801, Edward Ryley invented the transposing piano. This rare instrument has a lever under the keyboard to move the keyboard relative to the strings, so a pianist can play in a familiar key while the music sounds in a different key.

The minipiano 'Pianette' model viewed with its original matching stool: the wooden flap at the front of the instrument has been dropped revealing the tuning pins at the front.

The minipiano is an instrument patented by the Brasted brothers of the Eavestaff Ltd. piano company in 1934. This instrument has a braceless back and a soundboard positioned below the keys—long metal rods pull on the levers to make the hammers strike the strings. The first model, known as the Pianette, was unique in that the tuning pins extended through the instrument, so it could be tuned at the front.

The prepared piano, present in some contemporary art music from the 20th and 21st century is a piano which has objects placed inside it to alter its sound, or has had its mechanism changed in some other way. The scores for music for prepared piano specify the modifications, for example, instructing the pianist to insert pieces of rubber, paper, metal screws, or washers in between the strings. These objects mute the strings or alter their timbre.

Some Viennese fortepianos incorporated percussion effects, brought into action by levers. These were used in pieces such as Mozart's Rondo alla Turca.

The pedal piano is a rare type of piano that has a pedal keyboard at the base, designed to be played by the feet. The pedals may play the existing bass strings on the piano, or rarely, the pedals may have their own set of bass strings and hammer mechanisms. While the typical intended use for pedal pianos is to enable a keyboardist to practice pipe organ music at home, a few players of pedal piano use it as a performance instrument.

The Moór-Duplex piano (also known as the Duplex-Coupler grand piano) is a specialised piano featuring a double-keyboard which was invented in the early 1920s by the Hungarian composer and pianist Emánuel Moór. The two keyboards could be coupled one octave apart to allow the pianist to play wide spans more easily. After several initial prototypes by famous piano makers the instrument was withdrawn, as being complex to make, heavy and requiring pianist to re-learn fingering for familiar pieces. About 80 were made of which eight are believed to still exist.

Wadia Sabra had a microtone piano manufactured by Pleyel in 1920. Abdallah Chahine later constructed his quartertone "Oriental piano" with the help of Austrian Hofmann.

=== Electric, electronic, and digital ===
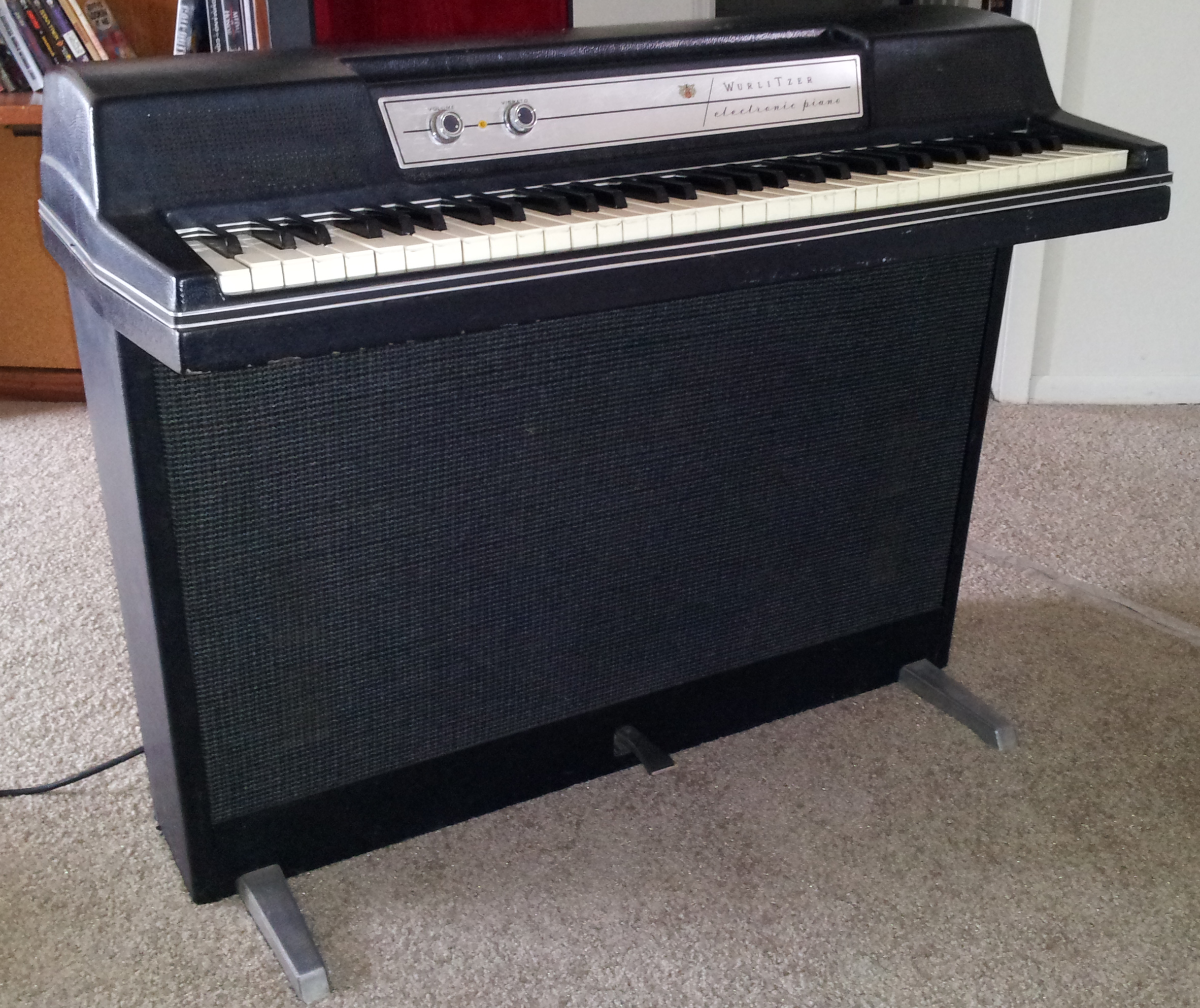
Wurlitzer 210 electric piano

With technological advances, amplified electric pianos (1929), electronic pianos (1970s), and digital pianos (1980s) have been developed. The first electric pianos from the late 1920s used metal strings with a magnetic pickup, an amplifier and a loudspeaker. The electric pianos that became most popular in pop and rock music in the 1960s and 1970s, such as the Fender Rhodes use metal tines in place of strings and use electromagnetic pickups similar to those on an electric guitar. The resulting electrical, analogue signal can then be amplified with a keyboard amplifier or electronically manipulated with effects units. In classical music, electric pianos are mainly used as inexpensive rehearsal or practice instruments. Electric pianos, particularly the Fender Rhodes, became important instruments in 1970s funk and jazz fusion and in some rock music genres.

Electronic pianos are non-acoustic; they do not have strings, tines or hammers, but are a type of analog synthesizer that simulates or imitates piano sounds using oscillators and filters that synthesize the sound of an acoustic piano. They must be connected to a keyboard amplifier and speaker to produce sound (however, some electronic keyboards have a built-in amp and speaker). Alternatively, a person can play an electronic piano with headphones in quieter settings.

Digital pianos are also non-acoustic and do not have strings or hammers. They use digital audio sampling technology to reproduce the acoustic sound of each piano note accurately. They also must be connected to a power amplifier and speaker to produce sound (however, most digital pianos have a built-in amp and speaker). Alternatively, a person can practise with headphones to avoid disturbing others. Digital pianos can include sustain pedals, weighted or semi-weighted keys, multiple voice options (e.g., sampled or synthesized imitations of electric piano, Hammond organ, violin, etc.), and MIDI interfaces. MIDI inputs and outputs connect a digital piano to other electronic instruments or musical devices. For example, a digital piano's MIDI out signal could be connected by a patch cord to a synth module, which would allow the performer to use the keyboard of the digital piano to play modern synthesizer sounds. Early digital pianos tended to lack a full set of pedals, but the synthesis software of later models such as the Yamaha Clavinova series synthesised the sympathetic vibration of the other strings (such as when the sustain pedal is depressed) and full pedal sets can now be replicated. The processing power of digital pianos has enabled highly realistic pianos using multi-gigabyte piano sample sets with as many as ninety recordings, each lasting many seconds, for each key under different conditions (e.g., there are samples of each note being struck softly, loudly, with a sharp attack, etc.). Additional samples emulate sympathetic resonance of the strings when the sustain pedal is depressed, key release, the drop of the dampers, and simulations of techniques such as re-pedalling.

Digital, MIDI-equipped pianos can output a stream of MIDI data, or record and play MIDI format files on digital storage media, similar in concept to a pianola. The MIDI file records the physics of a note rather than its resulting sound and recreates the sounds from its physical properties (e.g., which note was struck and with what velocity). Computer based software, such as Modartt's 2006 Pianoteq, can be used to manipulate the MIDI stream in real time or subsequently to edit it. This type of software may use no samples but synthesize a sound based on aspects of the physics that went into the creation of a played note.

=== Hybrid instruments ===
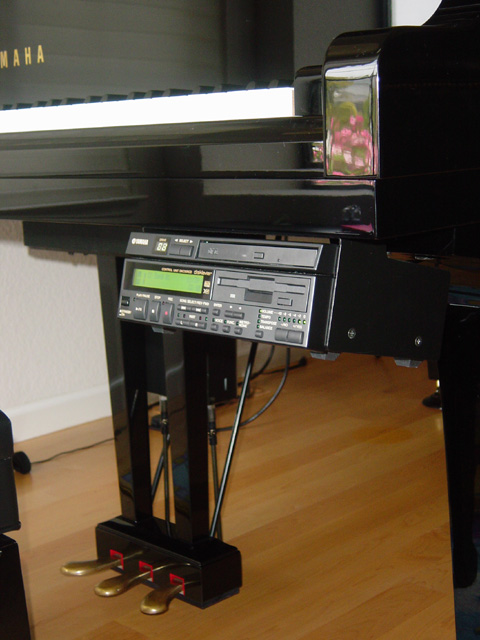
The Yamaha Disklavier player piano. The unit mounted under the keyboard of the piano can play MIDI or audio software on its CD.

By the 2000s, some pianos included an acoustic grand piano or upright piano combined with MIDI electronic features. Such a piano can be played acoustically, or the keyboard can be used as a MIDI controller, which can trigger a synthesizer module or music sampler. Some electronic feature-equipped pianos such as the Yamaha Disklavier electronic player piano, introduced in 1987, are outfitted with electronic sensors for recording and electromechanical solenoids for player piano-style playback. Sensors record the movements of the keys, hammers, and pedals during a performance, and the system saves the performance data as a Standard MIDI File (SMF). On playback, the solenoids move the keys and pedals and thus reproduce the original performance. Modern Disklaviers typically include an array of electronic features, such as a built-in tone generator for playing back MIDI accompaniment tracks, speakers, MIDI connectivity that supports communication with computing devices and external MIDI instruments, additional ports for audio and SMPTE input/output (I/O), and Internet connectivity. Disklaviers have been manufactured in the form of upright, baby grand, and grand piano styles (including a nine-foot concert grand). Reproducing systems have ranged from relatively simple, playback-only models to professional models that can record performance data at resolutions that exceed the limits of normal MIDI data. The unit mounted under the keyboard of the piano can play MIDI or audio software on its CD.

== Construction and components ==
(1) frame (2) lid, front part (3) capo bar (4) damper (5) lid, back part (6) damper mechanism (7) sostenuto rail (8) pedal mechanism, rods (9, 10, 11) pedals: right (sustain/damper), middle (sostenuto), left (soft/una-corda) (12) bridge (13) hitch pin (14) frame (15) sound board (16) string

Pianos can have over 12,000 individual parts, supporting six functional features: keyboard, action (including hammers, hammer shanks, and whippens), dampers and their underlevers, bridges, soundboard, and strings. Many parts of a piano are made of materials selected for strength and longevity. This is especially true of the outer rim, which is most commonly made of hardwood, typically hard maple or beech, and its massiveness serves as an essentially immobile object from which the flexible soundboard can best vibrate. According to Harold A. Conklin, the purpose of a sturdy rim is so that, "... the vibrational energy will stay as much as possible in the soundboard instead of dissipating uselessly in the case parts, which are inefficient radiators of sound."

Hardwood rims are commonly made by laminating thin, hence flexible, strips of hardwood, bending them to the desired shape immediately after the application of glue. The bent plywood system was developed by C.F. Theodore Steinway in 1880 to reduce manufacturing time and costs. Previously, the rim was constructed from several pieces of solid wood, joined and veneered, and European makers used this method well into the 20th century. A modern exception, Bösendorfer, an Austrian manufacturer of high-quality pianos, constructs their inner rims from solid spruce, the same wood that the soundboard is made from, which is notched to allow it to bend. Rather than isolating the rim from vibration, their "resonance case principle" allows the framework to resonate more freely with the soundboard, creating additional coloration and complexity of the overall sound.

The thick wooden posts on the underside (grands) or back (uprights) of the piano stabilize the rim structure and are made of softwood for stability. The requirement of structural strength, fulfilled by stout hardwood and thick metal, makes a piano heavy. Even a small upright can weigh 136 kg (300 lb). The Steinway concert grand (Model D) weighs 480 kg (1,060 lb). The largest piano available on the general market, the Fazioli F308, weighs 570 kg (1,260 lb).

The pinblock, which holds the tuning pins in place, is another area where toughness is important. It is made of hardwood, typically hard maple or beech, and is laminated for strength, stability and longevity. Piano strings, also called piano wire, which must endure years of extreme tension and hard blows, are made of high-carbon steel. They are manufactured to vary as little as possible in diameter, since all deviations from uniformity introduce tonal distortion. The bass strings of a piano are made of a steel core wrapped with one or two layers of copper wire (iron and aluminum have also been used), to increase their mass whilst retaining flexibility. If all strings throughout the piano's compass were individual (monochords), the massive bass strings would overpower the upper ranges. Makers compensate for this with the use of double strings (bichords) in the tenor and triple strings (trichords) throughout the treble.

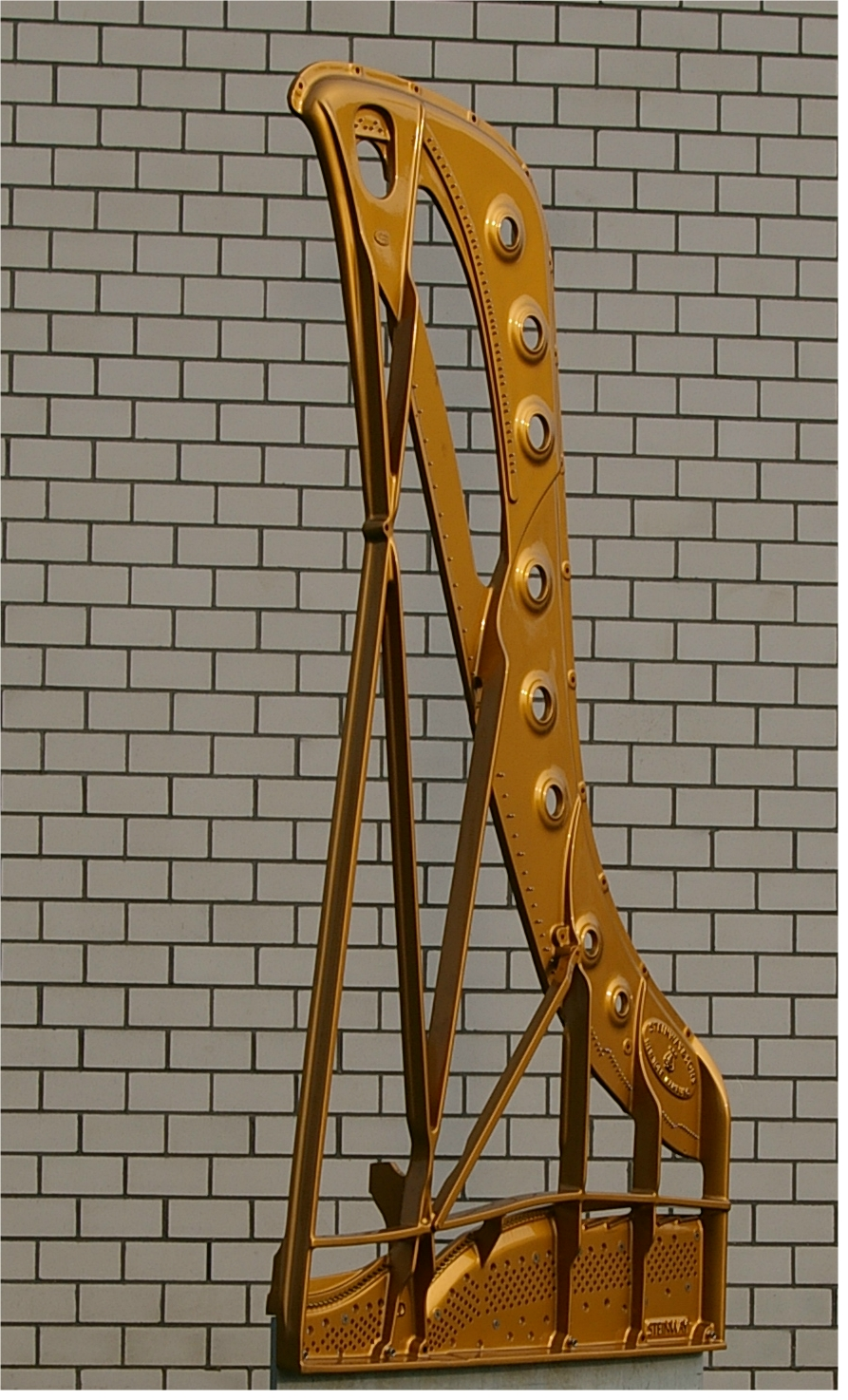
A cast iron plate of a grand piano

The plate (harp), or metal frame, of a piano is usually made of cast iron. A massive plate is advantageous. Since the strings vibrate from the plate at both ends, an insufficiently massive plate would absorb too much of the vibrational energy that should go through the bridge to the soundboard. While some manufacturers use cast steel in their plates, most prefer cast iron. Cast iron is easy to cast and machine, has flexibility sufficient for piano use, is much more resistant to deformation than steel, and is especially tolerant of compression. Plate casting is an art, since dimensions are crucial and the iron shrinks about one percent during cooling. Including an extremely large piece of metal in a piano is potentially an aesthetic handicap. Piano makers overcome this by polishing, painting, and decorating the plate. Plates often include the manufacturer's ornamental medallion.

In an effort to make pianos lighter, Alcoa worked with Winter and Company piano manufacturers to make pianos using an aluminum plate during the 1940s. Aluminum piano plates were not widely accepted and were discontinued. Prior to this, a piano made almost entirely of aluminum was placed aboard the airship Hindenburg.

The numerous parts of a piano action are generally made from hardwood, such as maple, beech, or hornbeam. Since World War II, makers have also incorporated plastics. Early plastics used in some pianos in the late 1940s and 1950s, proved problematic when they lost strength after a few decades of use. Beginning in 1961, the New York branch of the Steinway firm incorporated Teflon, a synthetic material developed by DuPont, for some parts of its so-called Permafree grand action rather than using time-tested wool cloth bushings.

They abandoned the experiment in 1982 due to both excessive friction causing sluggishness, and looseness resulting in "clicking". The tolerances required of a hard substance in which a pin must freely rotate proved problematic, and because Teflon is "humidity stable" despite swelling and shrinking of the wood adjacent to the Teflon, at certain times of the year, bushings would no longer be firmly captured in their housing.

More recently, the Kawai firm built pianos with action parts made of carbon fiber reinforced plastic. The piano parts manufacturer Wessell, Nickel and Gross has launched a new line of carefully engineered composite parts. Thus far these parts have performed reasonably, but it will take decades to know if they equal the longevity of wood.

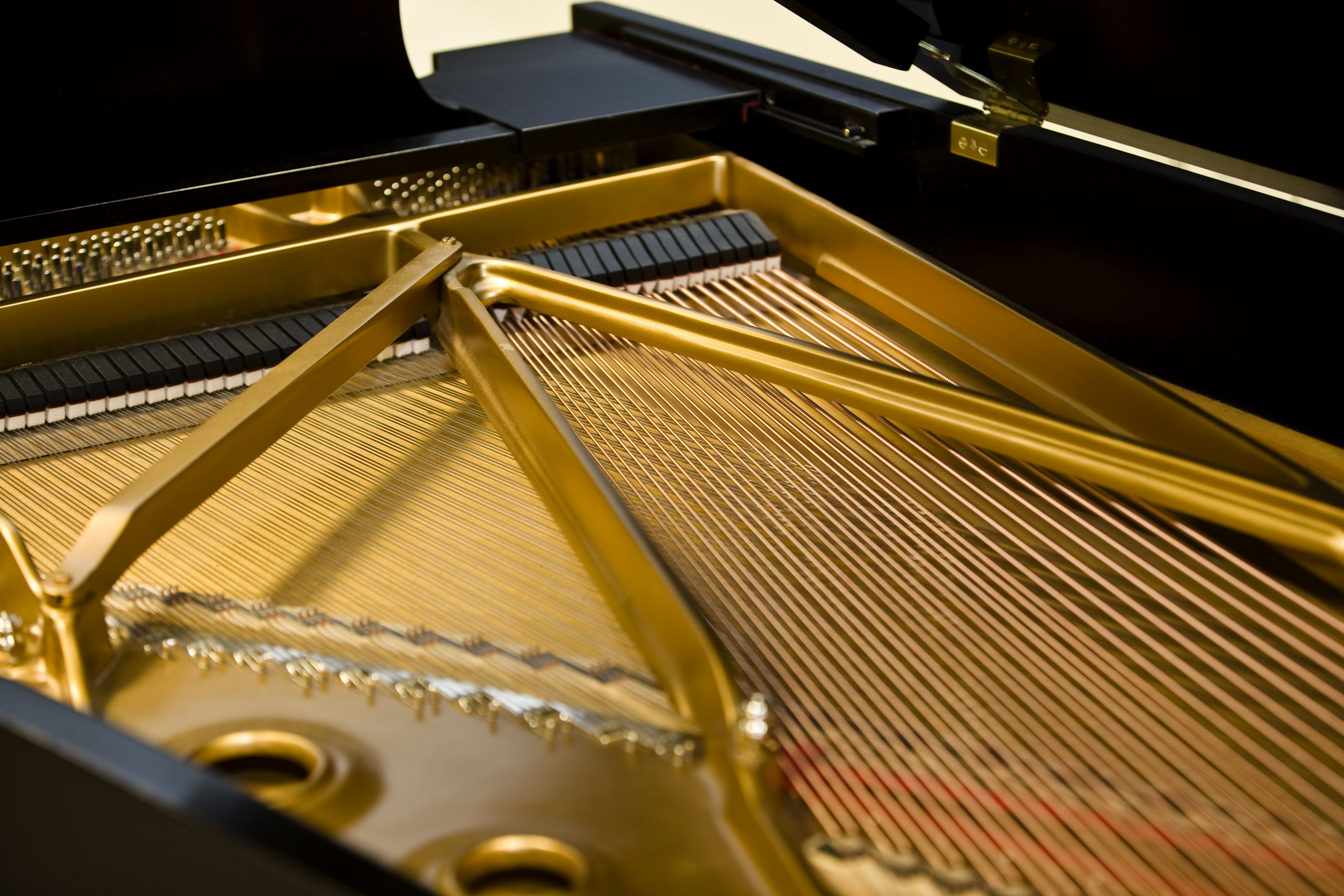
Strings of a grand piano

In all but the lowest quality pianos, the soundboard is made of spruce boards glued together along the side grain. Spruce's high ratio of strength to weight minimizes acoustic impedance while offering strength sufficient to withstand the downward force of the strings. The best piano makers use quarter-sawn, defect-free spruce of close annular grain, carefully seasoning it over a long period before fabricating the soundboards. This is the same material that is used in quality acoustic guitar soundboards. Low-cost pianos often have plywood soundboards.

The design of the piano hammers requires having the hammer felt be soft enough so that it will not create loud, very high harmonics that a hard hammer will cause. The hammer must be lightweight enough to move swiftly when a key is pressed; yet at the same time, it must be strong enough so that it can hit strings hard when the player strikes the keys forcefully for fortissimo playing or sforzando accents.

=== Keyboard ===
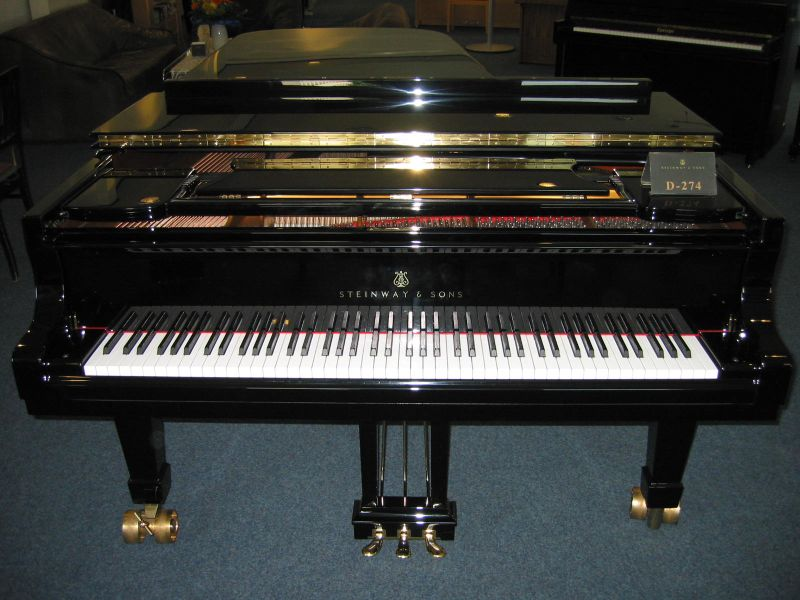
Keyboard of a grand piano

In the early years of piano construction, keys were commonly made from sugar pine. In the 2010s, they are usually made of spruce or basswood. Spruce is typically used in high-quality pianos. Black keys were traditionally made of ebony, and the white keys were covered with strips of ivory. Since ivory-yielding species are now endangered and protected by treaty, or are illegal in some countries, makers use plastics almost exclusively. Also, ivory tends to chip more easily than plastic. Legal ivory can still be obtained in limited quantities. Yamaha developed a plastic called Ivorite intended to mimic the look and feel of ivory, with manufacturers doing the same.

Most modern pianos have 52 white keys and 36 black keys, for a total of 88 keys (seven octaves plus a minor third, from A_{0} to C_{8}). Some older pianos only have 85 keys (seven octaves from A_{0} to A_{7}).

Some piano manufacturers have extended the range further in one or both directions. For example, the Imperial Bösendorfer has nine extra keys at the bass end, giving a total of 97 keys and an eight octave range. These extra keys are sometimes hidden under a small hinged lid that can cover the keys to prevent visual disorientation for pianists unfamiliar with the extra keys, or the colours of the extra white keys are reversed, black instead of white.

In 2018, Australian manufacturer Stuart & Sons created a piano with 108 keys, going from C_{0} to B_{8}, covering nine full octaves. Stuart & Sons also built a model with 112 keys (A_{−1} to C_{9}, one full octave both below and above the range of a standard 88-key piano) between 2022 and 2024, delivered to Rockford, USA in October 2024. The extra keys are the same as the other keys in appearance.

One benefit of the extra keys is increasing resonance from the associated strings. They vibrate sympathetically with other strings whenever the damper pedal is depressed and thus give a fuller tone. Only a very small number of works composed for piano actually use these notes.

Toy piano company Schoenhut manufactures grands and uprights with only 44 or 49 keys and a shorter distance between the keyboard and the pedals. These are true pianos with working mechanisms and strings.

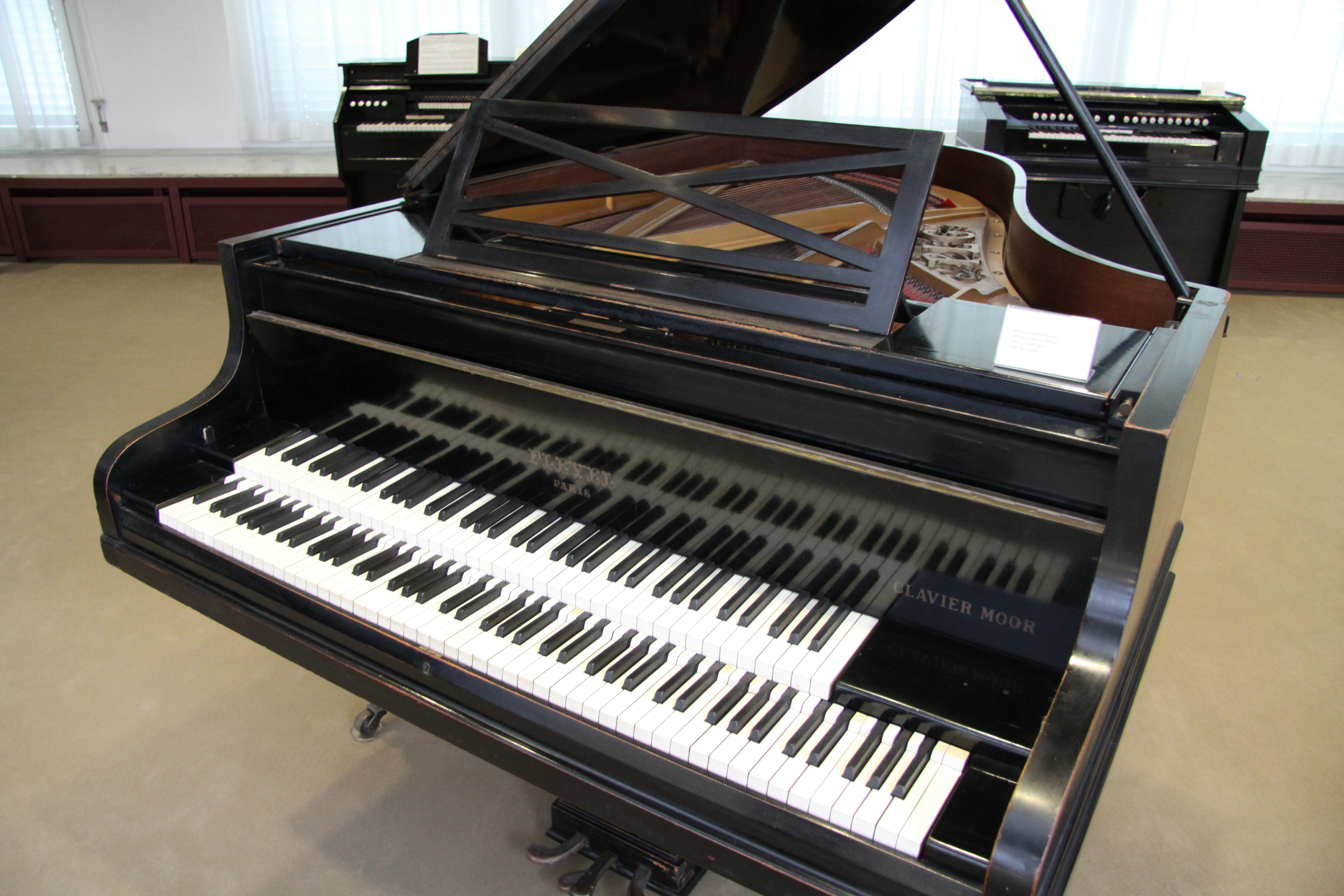
Emánuel Moór Pianoforte

A rare variant of the piano called the Emánuel Moór Pianoforte has double keyboards, one lying above the other. It was invented by Hungarian composer and pianist Emánuel Moór. The lower keyboard has the usual 88 keys, whilst the upper keyboard has 76 keys. When the upper keyboard is played, an internal mechanism pulls down the corresponding key on the lower keyboard, but an octave higher. This lets a pianist reach two octaves with one hand, impossible on a conventional piano.

Due to its double keyboard, musical works that were originally created for double-manual harpsichord, such as the Goldberg Variations by Bach, become much easier to play, since playing on a conventional single keyboard piano involves complex and hand-tangling cross-hand movements. The design features a special fourth pedal that couples the lower and upper keyboard, so when playing on the lower keyboard the note one octave higher also plays. Only about 60 Emánuel Moór Pianofortes were made, mostly by Bösendorfer. Other piano manufacturers, such as Bechstein, Chickering, and Steinway & Sons, also manufactured a few.

Pianos have been built with alternative keyboard systems, e.g., the Jankó keyboard.

=== Pedals ===
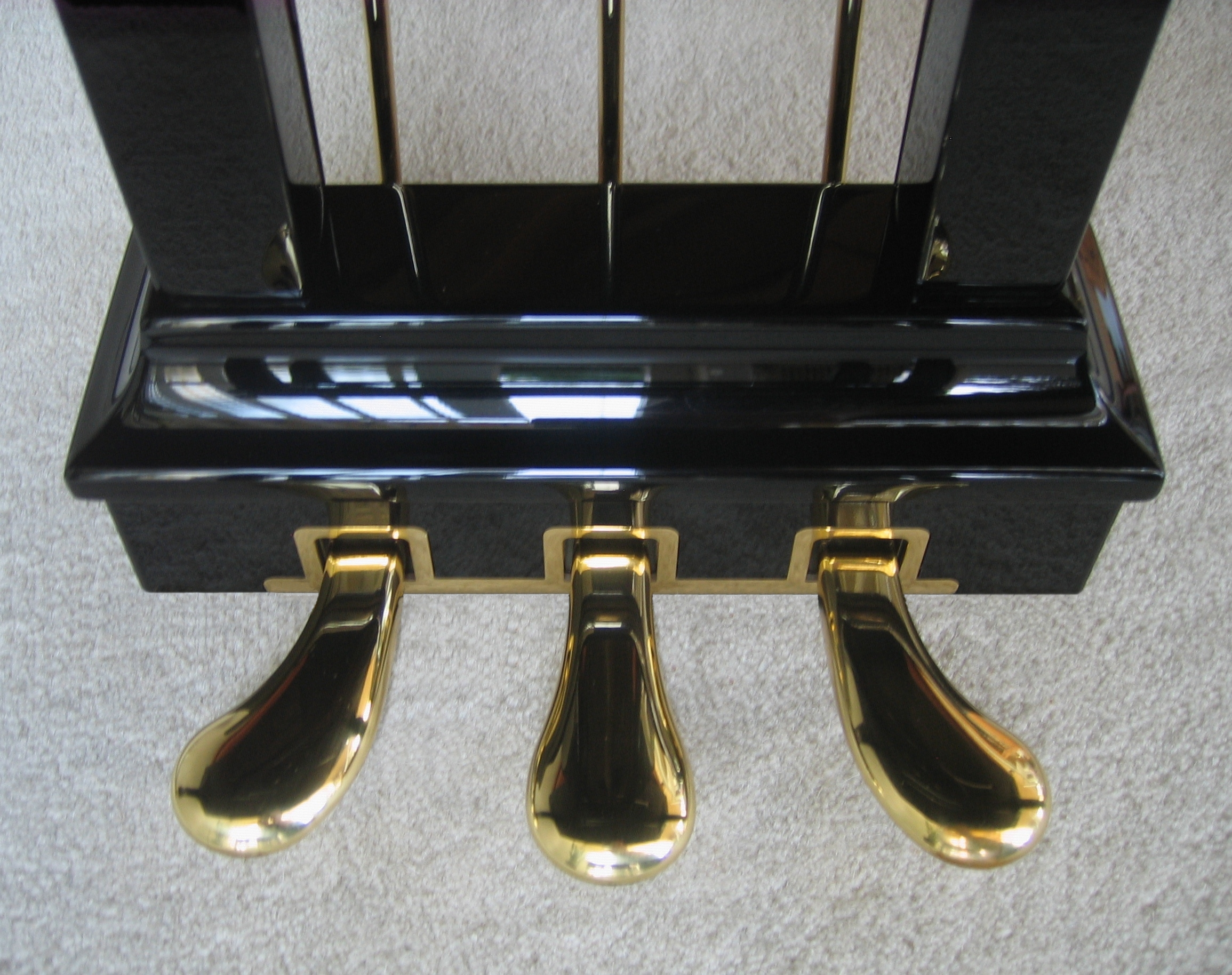
Piano pedals from left to right: una corda, sostenuto and sustain pedal

Pianos have had pedals, or some equivalent, since the earliest days. In the 18th century, some pianos used levers pressed upward by the player's knee instead of pedals. Most grand pianos in the US have three pedals: the soft pedal (una corda), sostenuto, and sustain pedal, from left to right, respectively. In Europe, the standard is two pedals: the soft pedal and the sustain pedal.

Most modern upright pianos have three pedals: soft pedal, practice pedal and sustain pedal. Older or cheaper models may lack the practice pedal. In Europe the standard for upright pianos is two pedals: the soft and the sustain pedals.

The sustain pedal, or damper pedal, is often simply called "the pedal", since it is the most frequently used. It is the rightmost pedal in the group. It lifts the dampers from all strings, sustaining all played notes. In addition, it broadens the overall tone by allowing all strings, including those not directly played, to reverberate sympathetically.

Sympathetic vibration of strings is strongest among notes that are harmonically related to the sounded pitches, i.e., a played 440 Hz "A" note would evoke the higher octave "A" notes followed by the next notes in the overtone sequence, but since all the piano strings have this cacophony overtones, the harmonic and inharmonic interaction is among all notes is enormous.

Notations used for the sustain pedal in sheet music

The soft pedal or una corda pedal is placed leftmost in the row of pedals. In grand pianos it shifts the entire action/keyboard assembly to the right (a very few instruments have shifted left) so that the hammers hit two of the three strings for each note. In the earliest pianos whose unisons were two strings rather than three, the action shifted so that hammers hit a single string, hence the name una corda, or 'one string'. The effect is to soften the note as well as change the tone. In upright pianos, depressing the pedal moves the hammers closer to the strings, allowing the hammers to strike with less force. This produces a slightly softer sound but no change in timbre.

On grand pianos, the middle pedal is a sostenuto pedal. This pedal keeps raised any damper already raised at the moment the pedal is depressed. This makes it possible to sustain selected notes (by depressing the sostenuto pedal before those notes are released) while the player's hands are free to play additional notes (which do not sustain). This can be useful for musical passages with low bass pedal points, in which a bass note is sustained while a series of chords changes over top of it, and other otherwise tricky parts. On many upright pianos, the middle pedal is called the "practice" or celeste pedal. This drops a piece of felt between the hammers and strings, greatly muting the sound of the instrument. This pedal can be shifted while depressed, into a "locking" position.

There are also non-standard variants. On some pianos (grands and verticals), the middle pedal can be a bass sustain pedal: that is, when it is depressed, the dampers lift off the strings only in the bass section. Players use this pedal to sustain a single bass note or chord over many measures, while playing the melody in the treble section.

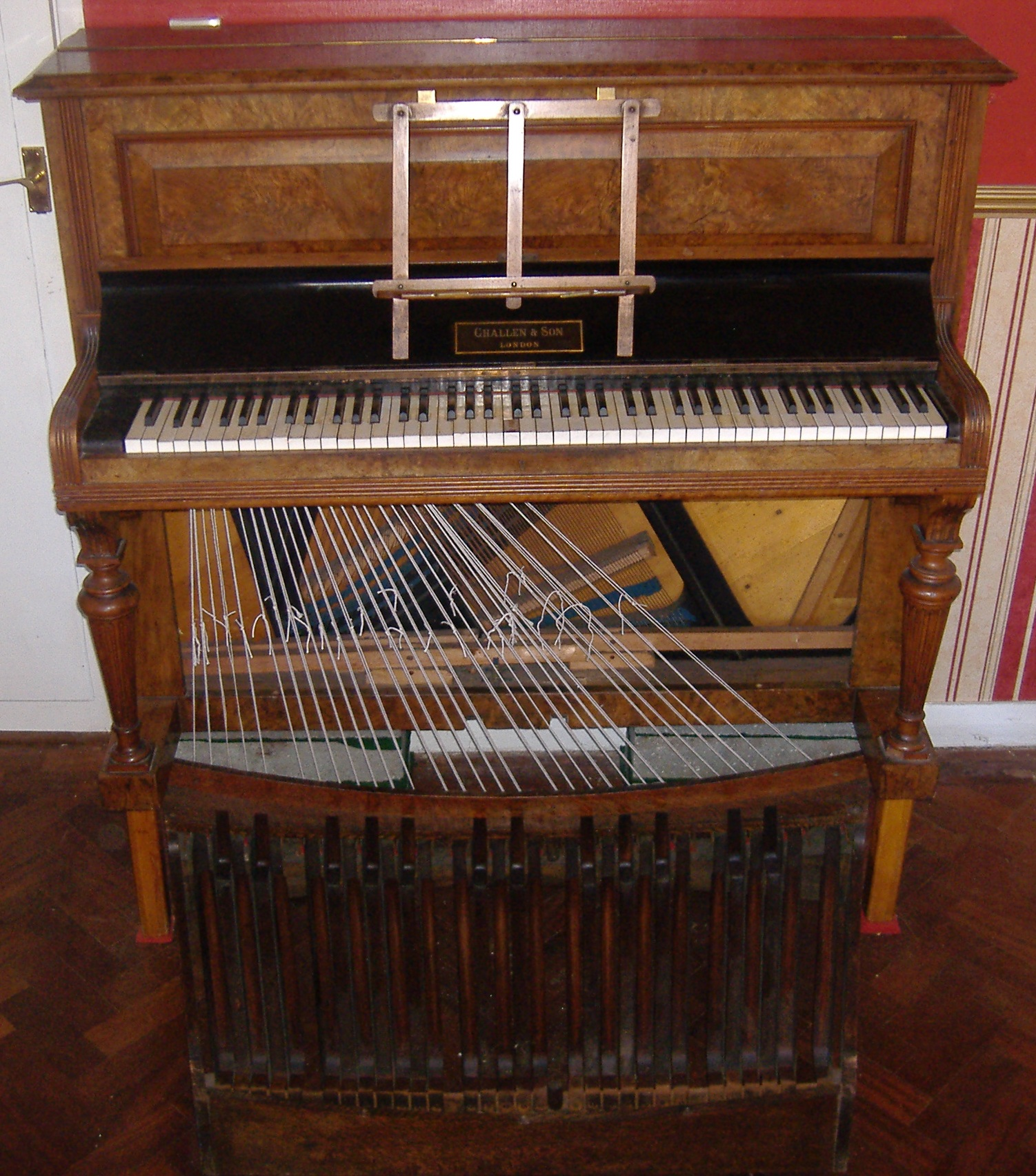
An upright pedal piano by Challen

The rare transposing piano (an example of which was owned by Irving Berlin) has a middle pedal that functions as a clutch that disengages the keyboard from the mechanism, so the player can move the keyboard to the left or right with a lever. This shifts the entire piano action so the pianist can play music written in one key so that it sounds in a different key.

Some piano companies have included extra pedals other than the standard two or three. On the Stuart and Sons pianos as well as the largest Fazioli piano, there is a fourth pedal to the left of the principal three. This fourth pedal works in the same way as the soft pedal of an upright piano, moving the hammers closer to the strings. The Crown and Schubert Piano Company also produced a four-pedal piano.

Wing and Son of New York offered a five-pedal piano from approximately 1893 to the 1920s. There is no mention of the company past the 1930s. Labeled left to right, the pedals are Mandolin, Orchestra, Expression, Soft, and Forte (Sustain). The Orchestral pedal produced a sound similar to a tremolo feel by bouncing a set of small beads dangling against the strings, enabling the piano to mimic a mandolin, guitar, banjo, zither and harp, thus the name Orchestral. The Mandolin pedal used a similar approach, lowering a set of felt strips with metal rings in between the hammers and the strings (aka rinky-tink effect). This extended the life of the hammers when the Orch pedal was used, a good idea for practicing, and created an echo-like sound that mimicked playing in an orchestral hall.

The pedalier piano, or pedal piano, is a rare type of piano that includes a pedalboard so players can use their feet to play bass register notes, as on an organ. There are two types of pedal piano. On one, the pedal board is an integral part of the instrument, using the same strings and mechanism as the manual keyboard. The other, rarer type, consists of two independent pianos (each with separate mechanics and strings) placed one above the other—one for the hands and one for the feet. This was developed primarily as a practice instrument for organists, though there is a small repertoire written specifically for the instrument.

== Mechanics ==
A pianist playing Prelude and Fugue No. 23 in B major (BWV 868) from Bach's The Well-Tempered Clavier on a grand piano

When a piano key is struck, a chain reaction occurs to produce the sound. First, the key raises the "wippen" mechanism, which forces the jack against the hammer roller (or knuckle). The hammer roller then lifts the lever carrying the hammer. The key also raises the damper. Immediately after the hammer strikes the wire it falls back, allowing the wire to resonate and thus produce sound. When the key is released, the damper falls back onto the strings, stopping the wire from vibrating, and thus stopping the sound.

The vibrating piano strings themselves are not very loud, but their vibrations are transmitted to a large soundboard that moves air and thus converts the energy to sound. The irregular shape and off-center placement of the bridge ensure that the soundboard vibrates strongly at all frequencies. The raised damper allows the note to sound until the key, or sustain pedal, is released.

There are three factors that influence the pitch of a vibrating wire.

- Length: All other factors the same, the shorter the wire, the higher the pitch.
- Mass per unit length: All other factors the same, the thinner the wire, the higher the pitch.
- Tension: All other factors the same, the tighter the wire, the higher the pitch.

A vibrating wire subdivides itself into many parts vibrating at the same time. Each part produces a pitch of its own, called a partial. A vibrating string has one fundamental and a series of partials. The purest combination of two pitches is when one is double the frequency of the other.

For a repeating wave, the velocity v equals the wavelength λ times the frequency f,

v = λf

On the piano string, waves reflect from both ends. The superposition of reflecting waves results in a standing wave pattern, but only for wavelengths λ = 2L, L, 2L/3, L/2, ... = 2L/n, where L is the length of the string. Therefore, the only frequencies produced on a single string are f = nv/2L. Timbre is largely determined by the content of these harmonics. Different instruments have different harmonic content for the same pitch. A real string vibrates at harmonics that are not perfect multiples of the fundamental. This results in a little inharmonicity, which gives richness to the tone but causes significant tuning challenges throughout the compass of the instrument.

Striking the piano key with greater velocity increases the amplitude of the waves and therefore the volume. From pianissimo (pp) to fortissimo (ff) the hammer velocity changes by almost a factor of a hundred. The hammer contact time with the string shortens from 4 milliseconds at pp to less than 2 ms at ff. If two wires adjusted to the same pitch are struck at the same time, the sound produced by one reinforces the other, and a louder combined sound of shorter duration is produced. If one wire vibrates out of synchronization with the other, they subtract from each other and produce a softer tone of longer duration.

== Maintenance ==
Piano maintenance includes the regular care and servicing of the instrument in order to preserve its sound quality and longevity. Owners may clean and care for it, but specialized technicians are needed for other work. Maintenance includes tuning, voicing, regulation and deep cleaning, which helps prevent damage caused by wear, temperature, and humidity, making sure the instrument remains in good condition.

=== Tuning ===
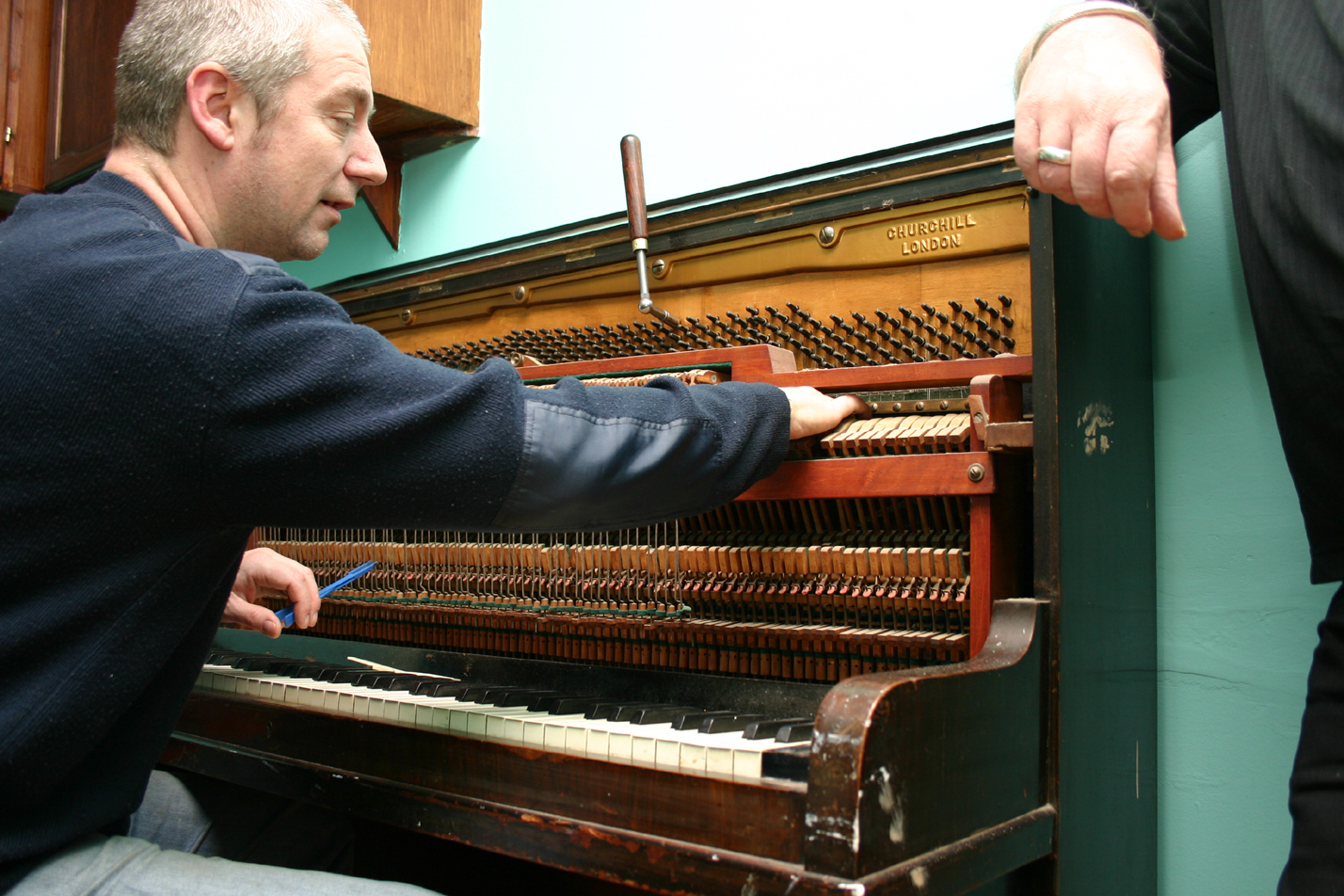
A piano tuner

Pianos are heavy and powerful, yet delicate instruments. Over the years, professional piano movers have developed special techniques for transporting both grands and uprights, which prevent damage to the case and to the piano's mechanical elements. Pianos need regular tuning to keep them on correct pitch. The hammers of pianos are voiced to compensate for gradual hardening of the felt, and other parts also need periodic regulation. Pianos need regular maintenance to ensure the felt hammers and key mechanisms are functioning properly. Aged and worn pianos can be rebuilt or reconditioned by piano rebuilders. Strings eventually must be replaced. Often, by replacing a great number of their parts and adjusting them, old instruments can perform as well as new pianos.

Piano tuning involves adjusting the tensions of the piano's strings with a specialized wrench, thereby aligning the intervals among their tones so that the instrument is in tune. While guitar and violin players tune their own instruments, pianists usually hire a piano tuner, a specialized technician, to tune their pianos. The piano tuner uses special tools. The meaning of the term in tune in the context of piano tuning is not simply a particular fixed set of pitches.

Fine piano tuning carefully assesses the interaction among all notes of the chromatic scale, different for every piano, and requires slightly different pitches from any theoretical standard. Pianos are usually tuned to a modified version of the system called equal temperament. In all systems of tuning, each pitch is derived from its relationship to a chosen fixed pitch, usually the internationally recognized standard concert pitch of A_{4} (the A above middle C). The term A440 refers to a widely accepted frequency of this pitch: 440 Hz.

The relationship between two pitches, called an interval, is the ratio of their absolute frequencies. Two different intervals are perceived as the same when the pairs of pitches involved share the same frequency ratio. The easiest intervals to identify, and the easiest intervals to tune, are those that are just, meaning they have a simple whole-number ratio. The term temperament refers to a tuning system that tempers the just intervals (usually the perfect fifth, which has the ratio 3:2) to satisfy another mathematical property; in equal temperament, a fifth is tempered by narrowing it slightly, achieved by flattening its upper pitch slightly, or raising its lower pitch slightly. A temperament system is also known as a set of "bearings".

Tempering an interval causes it to beat, which is a fluctuation in perceived sound intensity due to interference between close (but unequal) pitches. The rate of beating is equal to the frequency differences of any harmonics that are present for both pitches and that coincide or nearly coincide. Piano tuners have to use their ear to "stretch" the tuning of a piano to make it sound in tune. This involves tuning the highest-pitched strings slightly higher and the lowest-pitched strings slightly lower than what a mathematical frequency table (in which octaves are derived by doubling the frequency) would suggest.

== Playing and technique ==
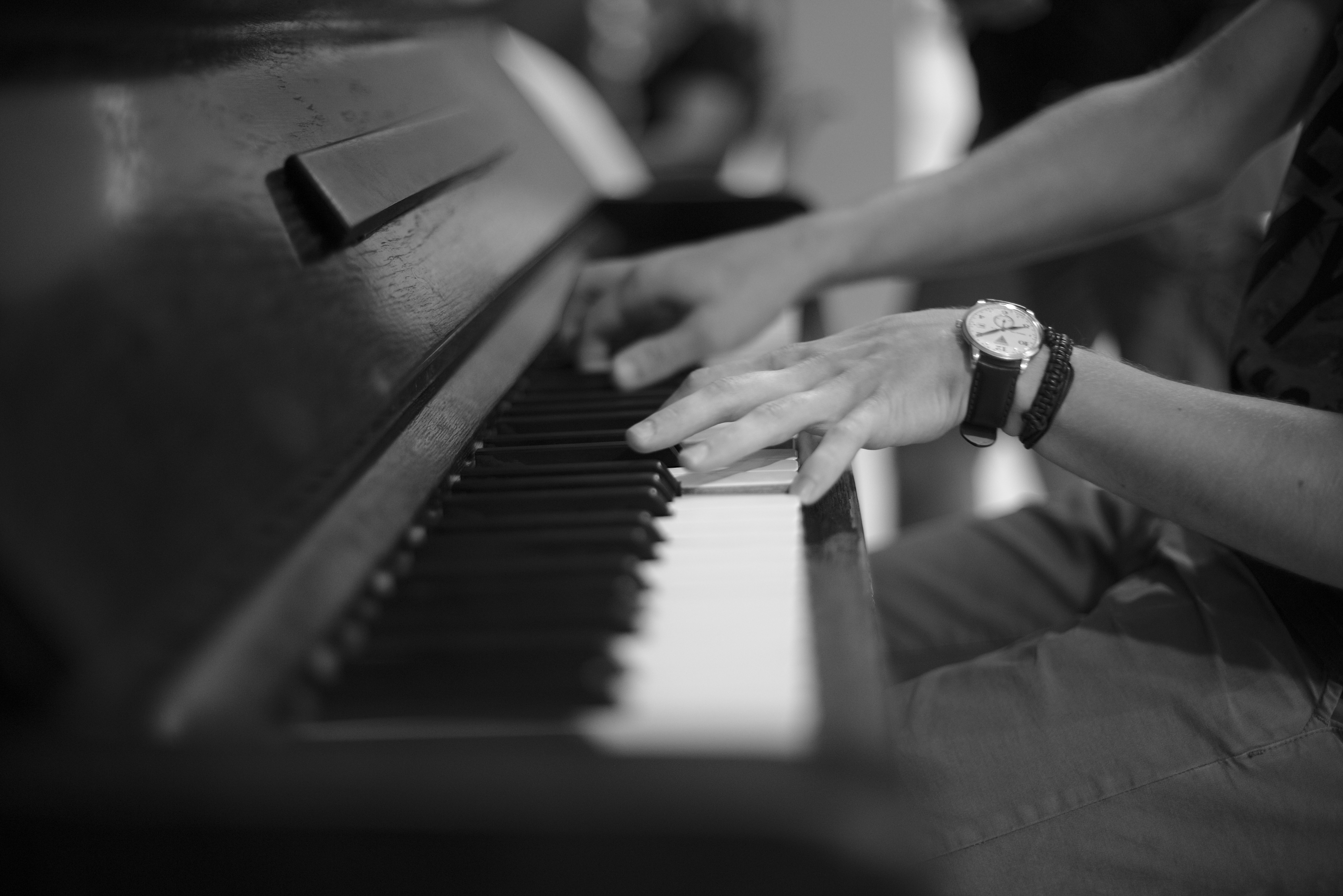
A Prague piano player

As with any other musical instrument, the piano may be played from written music, by ear, or through improvisation. While some folk and blues pianists were self-taught, in classical and jazz, there are well-established piano teaching systems and institutions, including pre-college graded examinations, university, college and music conservatory diplomas and degrees, ranging from the B.Mus. and M.Mus. to the Doctor of Musical Arts in piano. Piano technique evolved during the transition from harpsichord and clavichord to fortepiano playing and continued through the development of the modern piano. Changes in musical styles and audience preferences over the 19th and 20th century, as well as the emergence of virtuoso performers, contributed to this evolution and to the growth of distinct approaches or schools of piano playing. Although technique is often viewed as only the physical execution of a musical idea, many pedagogues and performers stress the interrelatedness of the physical and mental or emotional aspects of piano playing. Well-known approaches to piano technique include those by Dorothy Taubman, Edna Golandsky, Fred Karpoff, Charles-Louis Hanon and Otto Ortmann.

=== Performance styles ===
Many classical music composers, including Haydn, Mozart, Schubert and Beethoven, composed for the fortepiano, a rather different instrument than the modern piano. Even composers of the Romantic movement, like Franz Liszt, Frédéric Chopin, Clara and Robert Schumann, Fanny and Felix Mendelssohn, and Johannes Brahms, wrote for pianos substantially different from 2010-era modern pianos. Contemporary musicians may adjust their interpretation of historical compositions from the 17th century to the 19th century to account for sound quality differences between old and new instruments or to changing performance practice.

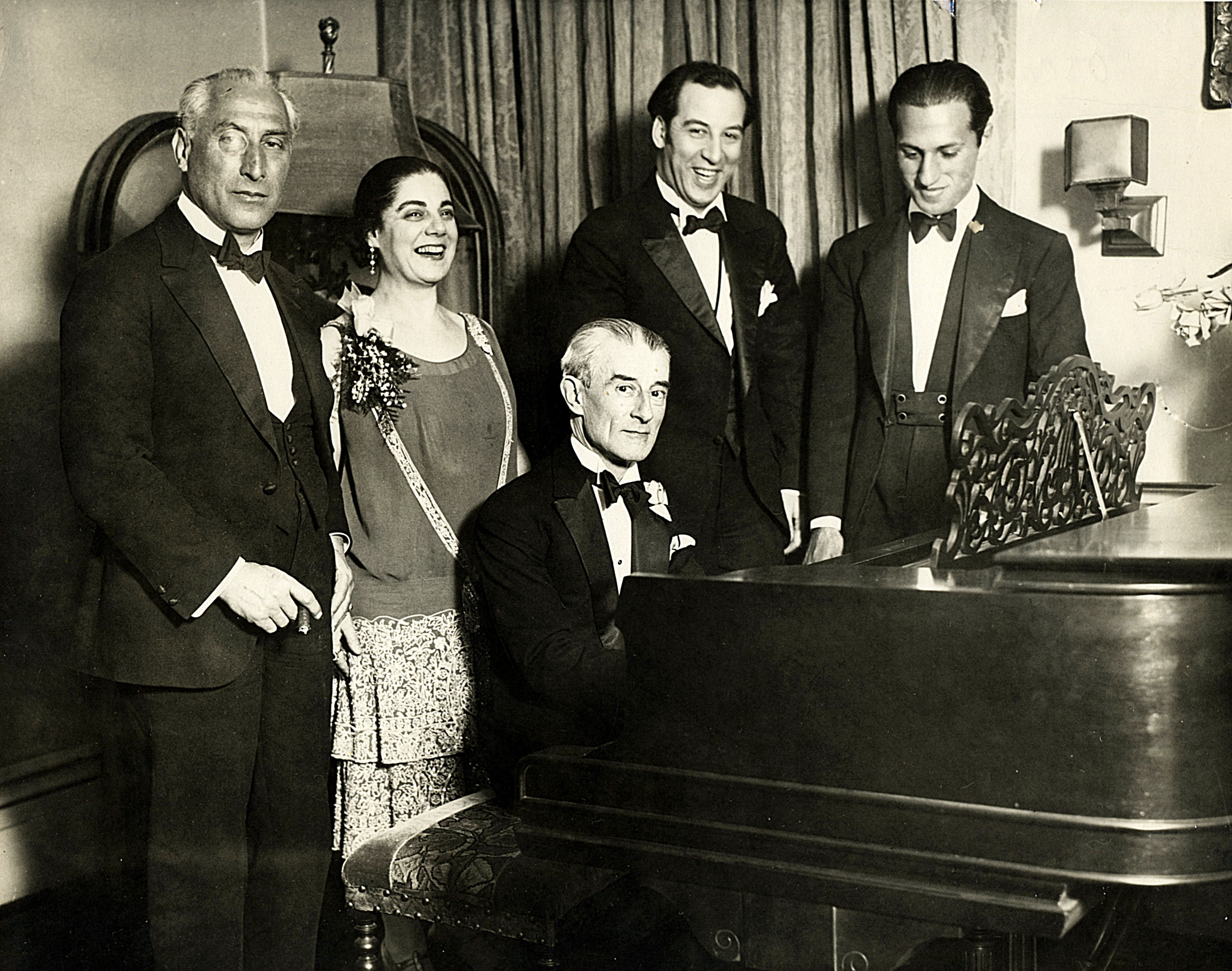
A birthday party honoring French pianist Maurice Ravel in 1928. From left to right: conductor Oskar Fried, singer Éva Gauthier, Ravel (at piano), composer-conductor Manoah Leide-Tedesco, and composer George Gershwin.

Starting in Beethoven's later career, the fortepiano evolved into an instrument more like the modern piano. Modern pianos were in wide use by the late 19th century. They featured an octave range larger than the earlier fortepiano instrument, adding around 30 more keys to the instrument, which extended the deep bass range and the high treble range. Factory mass production of upright pianos made them more affordable for a larger number of middle-class people. They appeared in music halls and pubs during the 19th century, providing entertainment through a piano soloist, or in combination with a small dance band. Just as harpsichordists had accompanied singers or dancers performing on stage, or playing for dances, pianists took up this role in the late 18th and following centuries.

During the 19th century, American musicians playing for working-class audiences in small pubs and bars, particularly African-American composers, developed new musical genres based on the modern piano. Ragtime music, popularized by composers such as Scott Joplin, reached a broader audience by 1900. The popularity of ragtime music was quickly succeeded by jazz piano. New techniques and rhythms were invented for the piano, including ostinato for boogie-woogie, and Shearing voicing. George Gershwin's Rhapsody in Blue broke new musical ground by combining American jazz piano with symphonic sounds.

Comping, a technique for accompanying jazz vocalists on piano, was exemplified by Duke Ellington's technique. Honky-tonk music, featuring yet another style of piano rhythm, became popular during the same era. Bebop techniques grew out of jazz, with leading composer-pianists such as Thelonious Monk and Bud Powell. In the late 20th century, Bill Evans composed pieces combining classical techniques with his jazz experimentation. In the 1970s, Herbie Hancock was one of the first jazz composer-pianists to find mainstream popularity working with newer urban music techniques such as jazz-funk and jazz-rock.

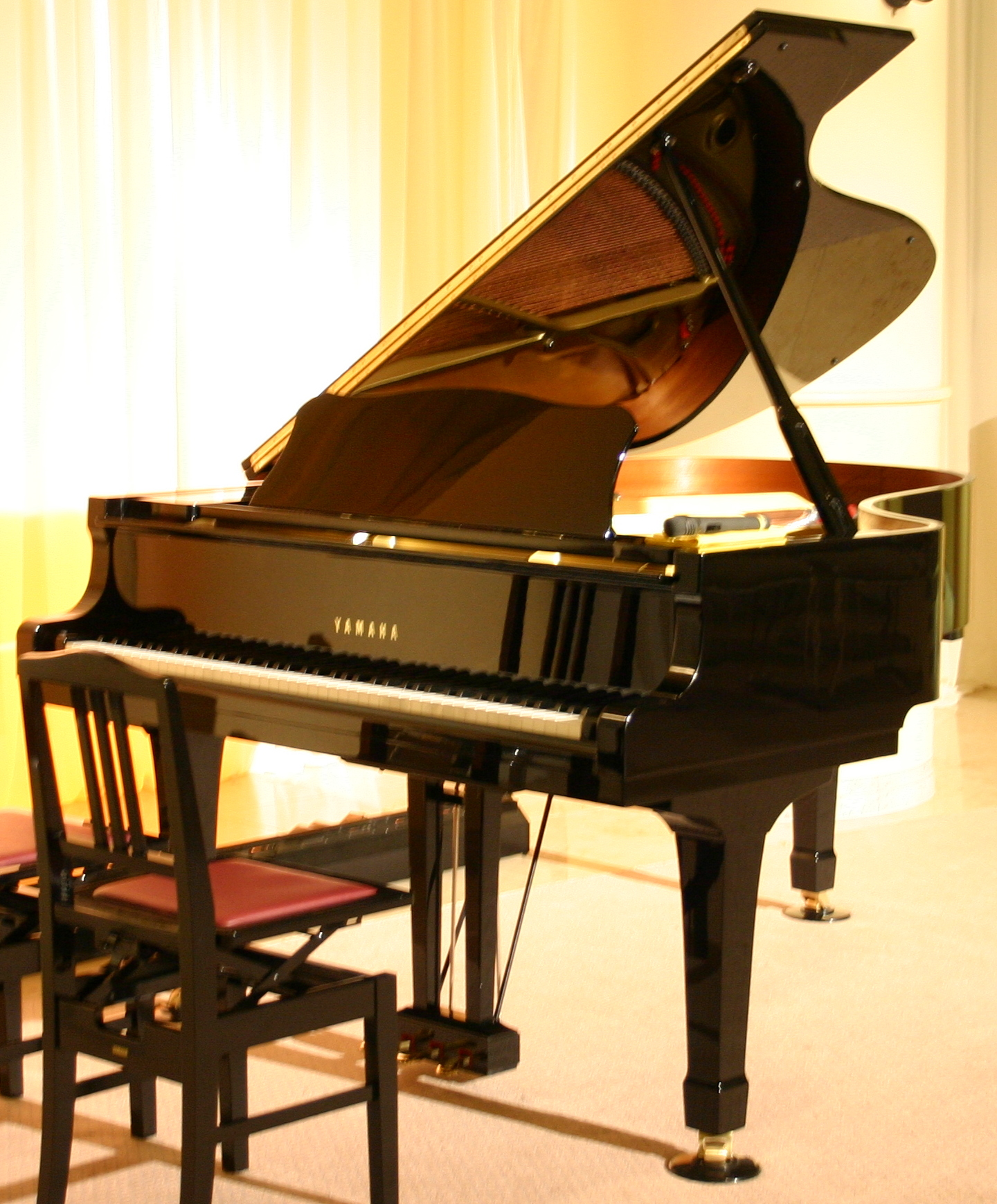
A Yamaha grand piano

Pianos have also been used prominently in rock and roll and rock music by performers such as Jerry Lee Lewis, Little Richard, Keith Emerson (Emerson, Lake & Palmer), Elton John, Ben Folds, Billy Joel, Nicky Hopkins, Rick Wakeman, Freddie Mercury and Tori Amos. At a 2023 auction in Sotheby's in London, Mercury's Yamaha baby grand piano, which he used to compose "Bohemian Rhapsody" among other Queen songs, sold for £1.7 million ($2.1 million), which Sotheby's state is a record for a composer's piano. Modernist styles of music have also appealed to composers writing for the modern grand piano, including John Cage and Philip Glass.

=== Traditional Burmese style ===
Introduced to Burma during the mid-19th century, the piano was quickly indigenized by court musicians and uses a novel "technique of interlocked fingering with both hands extending a single melodic line allowed for agogic embellishment, fleeting grace notes in syncopated spirals around a steady underlying beat found in the bell and clapper time keepers", adapted to play Mahāgīta compositions. Many Burmese pianists (e.g., Sandayar Hla Htut and Sandayar Chit Swe) adopt a title from the word for piano, sandaya (Burmese: စန္ဒရား).

== Role ==
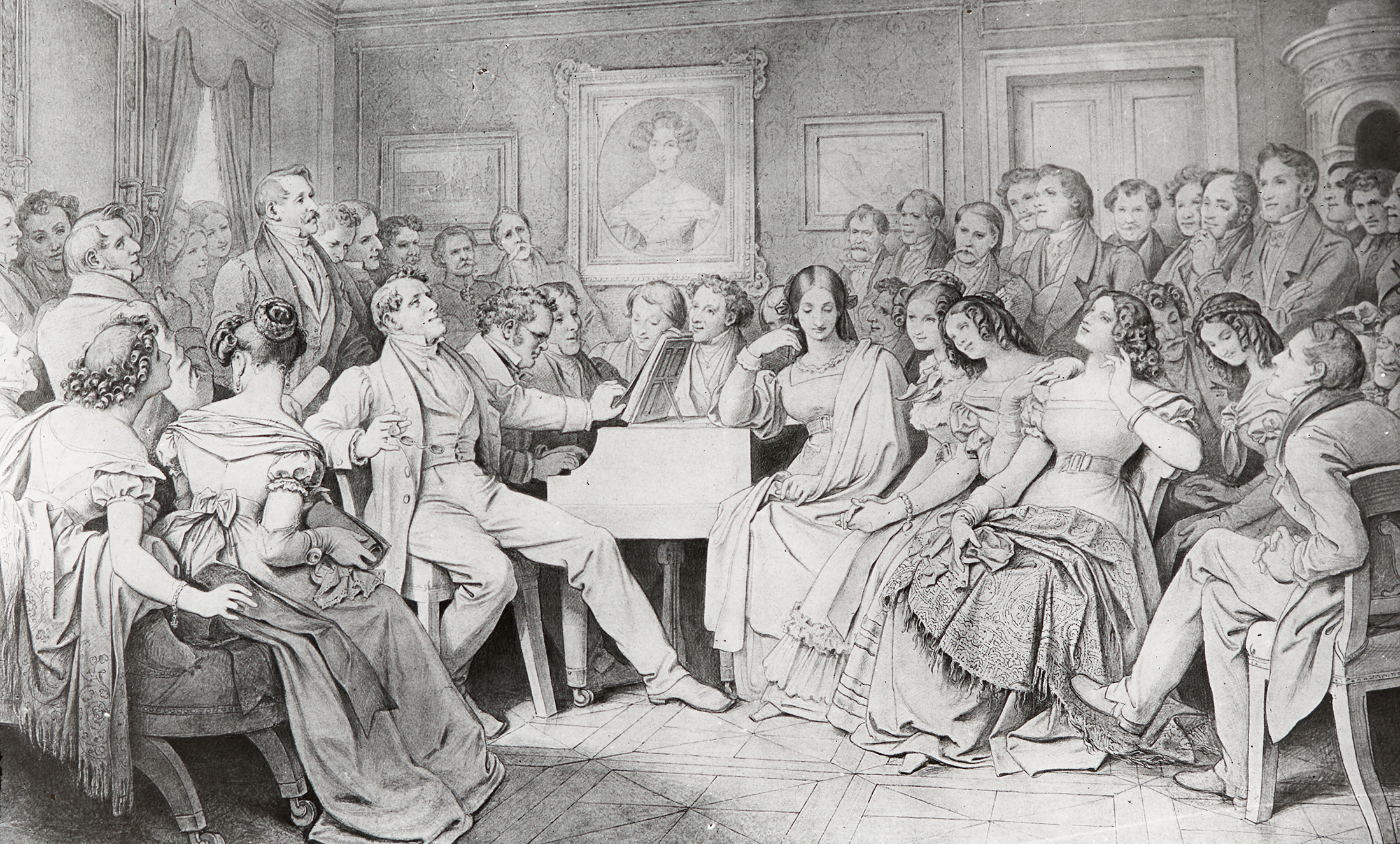
The piano was the centrepiece of social life in the 19th-century upper-middle-class home (Moritz von Schwind, 1868). The man at the piano is composer Franz Schubert (1797–1828).

The piano is a crucial instrument in many Western musical genres. Pianos are used in soloing or melodic roles and as accompaniment instruments. Pianos can be played alone, with a voice or other instrument, in small groups (bands and chamber music ensembles) and large ensembles (big band or orchestra). A large number of composers and songwriters are proficient pianists because the piano keyboard offers an effective means of experimenting with complex melodic and harmonic interplay of chords and trying out multiple, independent melody lines that are played at the same time. Pianos are used by composers doing film and television scoring, as the large range permits composers to try out melodies and bass lines, even if the music will be orchestrated for other instruments.

Bandleaders and choir conductors often learn the piano, as it is an excellent instrument for learning new pieces and songs to lead in performance. Many conductors are trained in piano, because it allows them to play parts of the symphonies they are conducting (using a piano reduction or doing a reduction from the full score), so that they can develop their interpretation. The piano is an essential tool in music education in elementary and secondary schools, and universities and colleges. Most music classrooms and many practice rooms have a piano. Pianos are used to help teach music theory, music history and music appreciation classes, and even non-pianist music professors or instructors may have a piano in their office.

== See also ==
- Piano extended technique – Unconventional method of playing piano
- Piano trio – Musical group of piano and two other instruments
- Piano stool, a height-adjustable bench used designed to be used while playing the piano
- Street piano – Piano placed in a public area
- Agraffe – Internal part of a grand piano
- Chiroplast
- List of classical pianists
- List of films about pianists
- List of piano manufacturers
- List of piano brand names
- List of piano makers
- List of piano composers

== Bibliography ==
- Davies, Hugh (2001). "Electronic piano". Grove Music Online (8 ed.). Oxford University Press. doi:10.1093/gmo/9781561592630.article.08697. ISBN 978-1-56159-263-0.
- Dolge, Alfred (1911). Pianos and Their Makers: A Comprehensive History of the Development of the Piano from the Monochord to the Concert Grand Player Piano. California: Covina Publishing Company.
- Ehrlich, Cyril (1990). The Piano: A History. Oxford, United Kingdom: Oxford University Press. ISBN 978-0-19-816171-4.
- Giordano, Nicholas J. Sr. (2010). Physics of the Piano. Oxford, United Kingdom: Oxford University Press. ISBN 978-0-19-954602-2.
- Grove Music Online (2001). Pianoforte. Oxford University Press. doi:10.1093/gmo/9781561592630.article.21631.
  - Ripin, Edwin M.; Pollens, Stewart (2001a). "I. History of the Instrument; 1. Introduction". In Grove Music Online (2001).
  - Ripin, Edwin M.; Pollens, Stewart (2001b). "I. History of the instrument; 2. Origins to 1750". In Grove Music Online (2001).
  - Cole, Michael (2001). "I. History of the instrument; 4. England and France to 1800.". In Grove Music Online (2001).
  - Ehrlich, Cyril; Good, Edwin M. "I. History of the instrument; 9. 1860–1915.". In Grove Music Online (2001).
- Fletcher, Neville H.; Rossing, Thomas D. (1998). The Physics of Musical Instruments (2 ed.). New York, NY: Springer. doi:10.1007/978-0-387-21603-4. ISBN 978-0-387-98374-5.
- Isacoff, Stuart (2012). A Natural History of the Piano: The Instrument, the Music, the Musicians – From Mozart to Modern Jazz and Everything in Between. Knopf Doubleday Publishing. ISBN 978-0307279330.
- Kennedy, Michael; Kennedy, Joyce; Rutherford-Johnson, Tim, eds. (2012). The Oxford Dictionary of Music (6 ed.). Oxford: Oxford University Press. doi:10.1093/acref/9780199578108.001.0001. ISBN 978-0-199-57810-8.
- Fine, Larry; Gilbert, Douglas R (2001). The Piano Book: Buying and Owning a New or Used Piano (4th ed.). Jamaica Plain, MA: Brookside Press. ISBN 1-929145-01-2.
- Good, Edwin M. (2001). Giraffes, black dragons, and other pianos: a technological history from Cristofori to the modern concert grand (2nd ed.). Stanford, CA: Stanford University Press. ISBN 0-8047-4549-8.
- Pollens, Stewart (1995). The Early Pianoforte. Cambridge, MA: Cambridge University Press. ISBN 0-521-41729-5.
- Reblitz, Arthur A. (1993). Piano Servicing, Tuning and Rebuilding: For the Professional, the Student, and the Hobbyist. Vestal, NY: Vestal Press. ISBN 1-879511-03-7.
- Rowland, David, ed. (1998). The Cambridge Companion to the Piano (1 ed.). Cambridge: Cambridge University Press. doi:10.1017/CCOL9780521474702. ISBN 978-0-521-47986-8.
  - Rowland, David (1998a). "The piano to c.1770". In Rowland (1998), pp. 5–21.
  - Rowland, David (1998b). "Pianos and pianists c.1770–c.1825". In Rowland (1998), pp. 22–39.
  - Rowland, David (1998c). "The piano since c.1825". In Rowland (1998), pp. 40–56.
  - Hamilton, Kenneth. "The virtuoso tradition". In Rowland (1998), pp. 57–74.
  - Richardson, Bernard. "The acoustics of the piano". In Rowland (1998), pp. 96–114.
  - Priestley, Brian. "Ragtime, blues, jazz and popular music". In Rowland (1998), pp. 209–244.
