= Challen (given name) =

Challen is a given name. Notable people with the name include:

- Challen Cates (born 1969), American independent film producer and actress
- Challen Skeet (1895–1978), English first-class cricketer

== See also ==
- Challen, surname
