= Abdallah Chahine =

Abdallah Chahine (Arabic: عبد الله شاهين; 1894 – 9 January 1975) was a Lebanese pianist and tuner-technician who devised an "Oriental piano" capable of playing quarter tones.

== Life ==
Born in 1894, Chahine developed an interest for music from a young age. At the age of 14, he received a harmonium as a gift from his father. He went on to play the instrument regularly St. Joseph's Church in Beirut. After his parents' refusal to send him to the Vienna Musical School, he started a job as a piano tuner, and later became one the first importers of Western instruments to Lebanon.

Even though Wadia Sabra had already had an Oriental piano (manufactured by Pleyel in Paris in 1920), as early as 1930–1931, Chahine developed the first prototypes of what would be his own Oriental piano. This was constructed with the help of Austrian manufacturer Hofmann (which has been producing the instrument since) and was first shown at the Austrian pavilion during a 1954 exhibition in Damascus. Two years later, he presented his instrument to the UNESCO Congress in Beirut. As worded by Thomas Burkhalter,

Using an old straight piano, Chahine invented a prototype that had chords, a keyboard of six octaves, and an ingenious pedal devised to obtain quartertones.

Among the composers drawn to Chahine's microtonal instrument were Aloys Hába (1893–1973), Mohammed Abdel Wahab (1898–1991) and Toufic Succar (1922–2017).

In 1962, Chahine recorded a vinyl record with Middle Eastern music. He had expanded his business founding the record label Voix de l'Orient / Sawt al-Sharq. On 13 March 1974, he was made a Knight of the Order of the Cedar.

Chahine had one daughter, Amira, and six sons, Joseph, Richard, Mozart, Bertrand, Antoine and René, who took up his business (currently known as Chahine & Fils) after his death. His family still owns his music store in Beirut, founded in 1952. His great-granddaughter Zeina Abirached has published a comicbook, Le piano oriental, about a character inspired by him.

== Sources ==
- The Concise Garland Encyclopedia of World Music. Vol. 2. Routledge. 2008.
- Kozma, Liat; Schayegh, Cyrus; Wishnitzer, Avner, eds. (2014). "'Small' Technologies and Consumer Goods". A Global Middle East.
- Burman Hall, Linda (2005). Kimberlin, Cynthia Tse; Euba, Akin (eds.). Towards an African Pianism: Keyboard Music of Africa and the Diaspora. Vol. 1.
- Les Cahiers de l'Oronte. 1969.
- Burkhalter, Thomas (2014). Local Music Scenes and Globalization: Transnational Platforms in Beirut.
