= Aluminum piano plate =

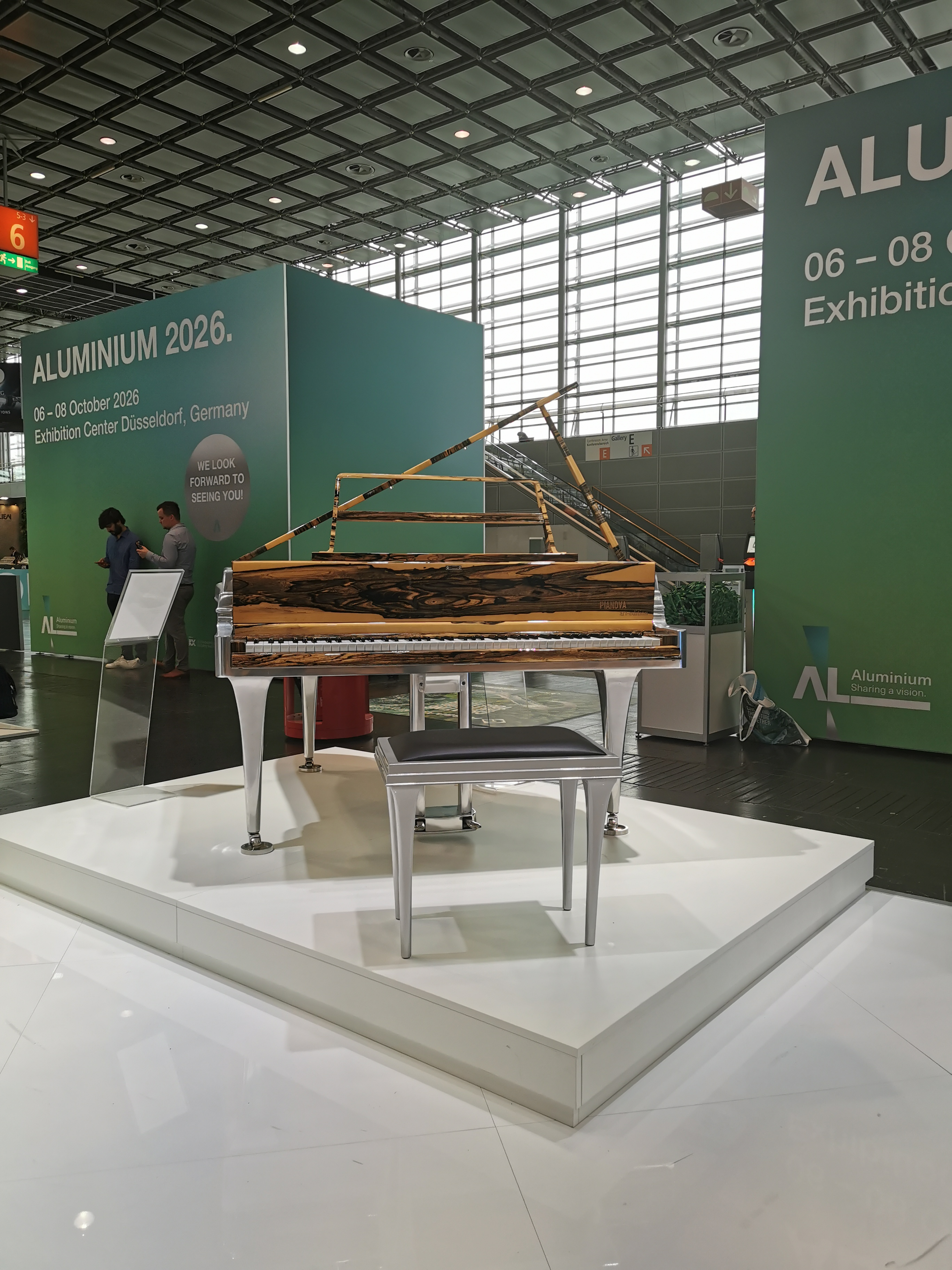
Alcoa Aluminium Piano

A piano with an aluminum piano plate, called the Alumatone plate, was announced in 1945 by Winter and Company, piano manufacturers, and Alcoa, a manufacturer of aluminum and aluminum products. The metal frame of a piano, often called the plate or harp, anchors both ends of the strings, withstanding a tension of 20 tons or more. The first completely metal frames were patented in the mid-1820s, and they are now generally cast in iron.

The similar strength of aluminum and cast iron permitted the weight of the cast metal frame to be reduced more than 60 percent, to as little as 45 pounds for a spinet. In 1945 Alcoa signed an agreement with Winter and Company to manufacture aluminum piano plates and began to market their new creation. Many of Alcoa's ads can be seen in Etude, a magazine for the musician and pianist, in 1949 and 1950. The typical ad campaign boasted the slogan “stop…lift…listen,” which was asking consumers to stop, feel the light weight of the new piano, and listen to the quality of sound. A brochure, circulated by Alcoa, claimed that some 50,000 pianos had been created containing this aluminum plate by 1949. After 1950, however, the aluminum piano plate was no longer used by piano manufacturers.

== Other aluminum instruments ==
As soon as aluminum was available in the late nineteenth century, people began experimenting with making new or improved musical instruments, but it was not until the 1930s that companies began to consider mass-producing them. At that time Joseph E. Maddy, founder of the Interlochen School of Music, (now the Interlochen Center for the Arts), requested that Alcoa experiment with manufacturing an aluminum violin and string bass. As a band director, Maddy was looking for durability in musical instruments. He wanted an instrument that could handle the abuse it received from his students as well as from atmospheric changes, since many of his rehearsals were conducted outside. These instruments, however, were not popular, and Maddy's business venture did not flourish. Other products using aluminum were manufactured in the 1930s including Laurens Hammond’s electric organ created in 1935. Some instruments were more successful than others, such as the vibraphone or vibraharp. The vibraphone, a percussion instrument consisting of a series of bars with tubes below to help resonate the sound, was created in 1921 by the Leedy Manufacturing Company. It got its name from the vibrating fans below the bars that could be turned on an off electronically, giving the instrument a vibrato effect. The Vibraharp, created in 1928 by J.C. Deagan, is the same instrument, but created out of aluminum instead of wood or steel. Due to its success, Leedy began manufacturing their vibraphones with aluminum in 1929, and they are still made of aluminum today.

In the mid-1930s, the Blüthner piano company built a lightweight aluminum alloy piano for the airship Hindenburg.
