= Otto Ortmann =

Otto Rudolph Ortmann (1889-1979) was an American pianist, music researcher and educator, and author of the groundbreaking Physiological Mechanics of Piano Technique. He graduated from the Peabody Conservatory in 1917, where he remained as a member of its faculty, establishing a research lab there, and going on to serve as conservatory director from 1928 to 1942. His career was marked by a focus on the scientific exploration of the piano arts. Published in 1929, The Physiological Mechanics of Piano Technique: An Experimental Study of the Nature of Muscular Action as Used in Piano Playing, and of the Effects Thereof Upon the Piano Key and the Piano Tone, applied the laws of mechanics and physiology to the study of piano performance.
