= James Challen senior =

English cricketer

James Challen
Personal information
- Relatives: James Challen junior (son)

Domestic team information
- Years: Team
- 1847–1849: Sussex

Career statistics
Competition	First-class
Matches	7
Runs scored	109
Batting average	10.90
100s/50s	0/1
Top score	53
Catches/stumpings	4/–
- Source: Cricinfo, 28 January 2012

James Challen (dates of birth and death unknown) was an English cricketer. Challen's batting style is unknown. Though his date of birth is not known, it is known he was christened on 11 August 1787 at Lurgashall, Sussex.

Challen made his first-class debut for Petworth in 1845 against the Marylebone Cricket Club at Lord's in 1845. He played two further first-class matches for Petworth in 1845, both at the Petworth Park New Ground against Hampshire and the Marylebone Cricket Club. In his three first-class appearances for Petworth, he scored 67 runs at an average of 16.75, with a high score of 53. Two years later he made his first-class debut for Sussex against England. He played three further first-class matches for the county, the last of which came against Surrey. In his four first-class matches for Sussex, he scored a total of 42 runs at an average of 7.00, with a high score of 15.

His son, James Challen junior, played first-class cricket for Sussex.
