= James Challen junior =

English cricketer

James Challen
Personal information
- Born: 4 October 1825; Kirdford, Sussex, England
- Died: 1900 (aged 74–75); Sussex, England
- Relatives: James Challen senior (father)

Domestic team information
- Years: Team
- 1848–1857: Sussex

Career statistics
Competition	First-class
Matches	21
Runs scored	347
Batting average	9.13
100s/50s	0/0
Top score	37
Balls bowled	375
Wickets	23
Bowling average	14.75
5 wickets in innings	0
10 wickets in match	0
Best bowling	4/?
Catches/stumpings	12/–
- Source: Cricinfo, 28 January 2012

James Challen (4 October 1825 – 1900) was an English cricketer. Challen's batting and bowling styles are unknown. He was born at Kirdford, Sussex.

Challen made his first-class debut for Sussex against Kent in 1848. He made eighteen further first-class appearances for the county, the last of which came against Kent in 1857. In his nineteen first-class appearances for Sussex, he took 23 wickets at an average of 14.75, with the most wickets he took in a single innings standing at 4. Due to incomplete records, his exact best figures are unknown. Challen played as a bowler, as such he had little success with the bat. He scored a total of 323 runs for Sussex, which came at a batting average of 9.22, with a high score of 37. Challen also made a single first-class appearance each for the Players against the Gentlemen in 1854, and for England against the Marylebone Cricket Club in the same year.

He died somewhere in Sussex in 1900. His father, James Challen senior, played first-class cricket for Sussex.
