= Charles Challen (cricketer) =

English important cricketer

Charles Challen (born 8 June 1790) was an English cricketer associated with Sussex who was active in the 1810s. He is recorded in one match in 1814, totalling 0 runs with a highest score of 0.

== Bibliography ==
- Haygarth, Arthur (1996) [1862]. Scores & Biographies, Volume 1 (1744–1826). Kennington: Frederick Lillywhite. ISBN 978-19-00592-23-9.
