= Challen Skeet =

English cricketer (1895–1978)

Challen Skeet at Oxford

Challen Hasler Lufkin Skeet (17 August 1895 – 20 April 1978) was an English first-class cricketer who played for Middlesex and Oxford University between 1919 and 1922.

Skeet was born in Oamaru, Otago, New Zealand. His family moved to England when he was a boy and he was educated at St Paul's School, London, and Merton College, Oxford. He served as a second lieutenant in the 12th Royal Fusiliers during World War I and was taken prisoner during the Battle of Loos in September 1915.

Skeet was "a solid bat rather than a stroke player" but was "one of the great fieldsmen of his time". In the last match of the 1920 season he played an innings for Middlesex that helped them win the County Championship: against Surrey at Lord's they were 73 behind on the first innings but Skeet (who scored 106, his only first-class century) and Harry Lee opened the second innings with a partnership of 208, and Middlesex went on to win.

He served the British government in Sudan for many years as a District Commissioner. He married Aileen Grace Rand in London in 1926. He died in West Tytherley, Hampshire.
