= 12 Step foot controller =

Programmable MIDI controller pedal keyboard

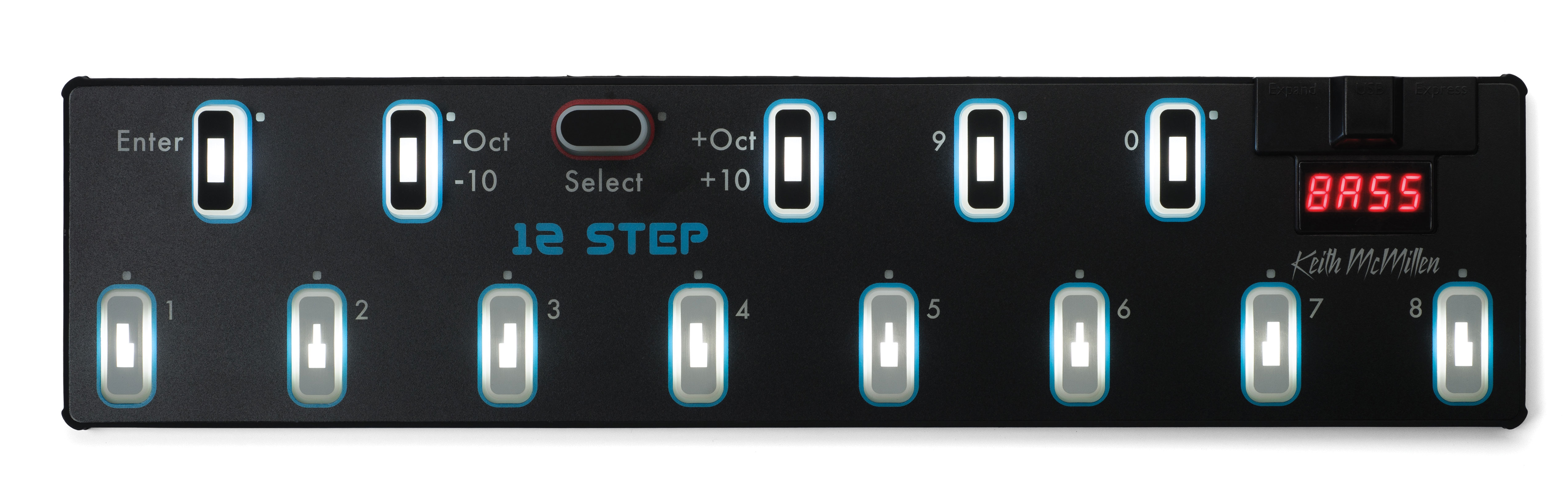
The 12 step foot controller is the first Keith McMillen Instruments-designed pedal keyboard-style MIDI controller.

The 12 Step foot controller is a bass pedal-style programmable MIDI controller pedal keyboard made by Keith McMillen Instruments which was released in 2011. It has small, soft, rubbery keys that are played with the feet. As a MIDI controller, it does not make or output any musical sounds by itself; rather, it sends MIDI (Musical Instrument Digital Interface) messages about which notes are played (and with which types of expression or pressure) to an external synth module or computer music program running on a laptop or other computer. Each key on the 12 Step senses the velocity, aftertouch pressure, and the amount of tilt the player is applying with their feet. The messages from the player's foot presses can be sent via USB to a computer-based virtual instrument or to a synthesizer or other electronic or digital musical instrument.

The expressive nuances in playing the 12 Step can be used to make a virtual instrument or synthesizer's melodic line change in sound or timbre. For example, a melody line could be played to get louder and softer by pressing the keys harder or more gently; by continuing to hold down a long note, the player could trigger effects on the synth patch such as vibrato; and by tilting the foot on the key, they could trigger a pitch bend (depending on the user's programming of the 12 Step and the design of the synth patch). The 12 Step's keys can be used to play individual notes in many octaves, enabling it to be used to play anything from deep-pitched basslines or high-pitched melody lines.

As well, the keys on the 12 step can be programmed to play chords of up to five unique notes per rubbery key (e.g., the C note can be programmed to play a C major chord, the D note can be programmed to play a "d minor" chord, and so on). The programmable chord feature enables performers to play chords with their feet and accompany themselves or be a one man band. The 12 Step has 59 factory preset programming choices, including a chromatic scale and many different types of chords (major, minor, dominant seventh, power chords, etc.). The user can also program their own chords for each key of the instrument. The 12 Step's keys can also be used to trigger "clips", backing tracks, or song sections in digital audio workstations, music sequencers, and music apps.

The 12 Step 2, released in 2014, has some improvements. A similarly named 12 Step V2 has more changes, including improved editing software, Ableton templates, and improvements to the pedal keyboard's features. While it has the same housing and format, it adds a TRS MIDI output to connect to 5-pin MIDI synth modules and two CV outputs to send MIDI messages to Eurorack or modular synths. On September 17, 2024, the company rebranded under the name Muse Kinetics and the 12 Step 2 was among the list of continued products.

== History ==
In 2005, Keith McMillen (1957–2024) founded Keith McMillen Instruments (KMI), a hardware and software company that designs music and stage equipment that interfaces with computers. He founded the company after touring as a musician with large, cumbersome gear and recognized the need for equipment compact enough to easily carry on an airplane. The resulting devices are "polyphonic multidimensional controllers," and in addition to USB and MIDI capability, some can use the [in that era] proposed MIDI extension MIDI Polyphonic Expression (MPE), which enables polyphonic aftertouch and sophisticated responsiveness. Keith McMillen Instruments' engineers design a range of MIDI devices and controllers. They noted that most bass pedal-type pedal keyboards did not give the player much expressive control. Most 1980s and 1990s-era bass pedal MIDI controllers are simply an on-off switch, so players could not add expressive changes of dynamics or nuance to their foot-played musical lines.

Keith McMillen Instruments' first exploration of foot controllers was the Soft Step, which was released in 2011. The SoftStep has "ten pressure- and direction-sensitive backlit keys, [and] a 4-character LED display" and it could send messages to computer audio programs, enabling musicians to, say, start a sequencer or trigger a device. The buttons on the SoftStep are user programmable, so each person could customize their SoftStep to control different functions on their computer music or electronic gear's set up. The one drawback of the SoftStep is that even though it can be programmed to play individual notes on a synthesizer, it was not intended to be used as a musical instrument. The company engineers set out to create a new programmable foot controller, the 12 Step, that was designed for expressive pedal keyboard playing.

== Elements ==
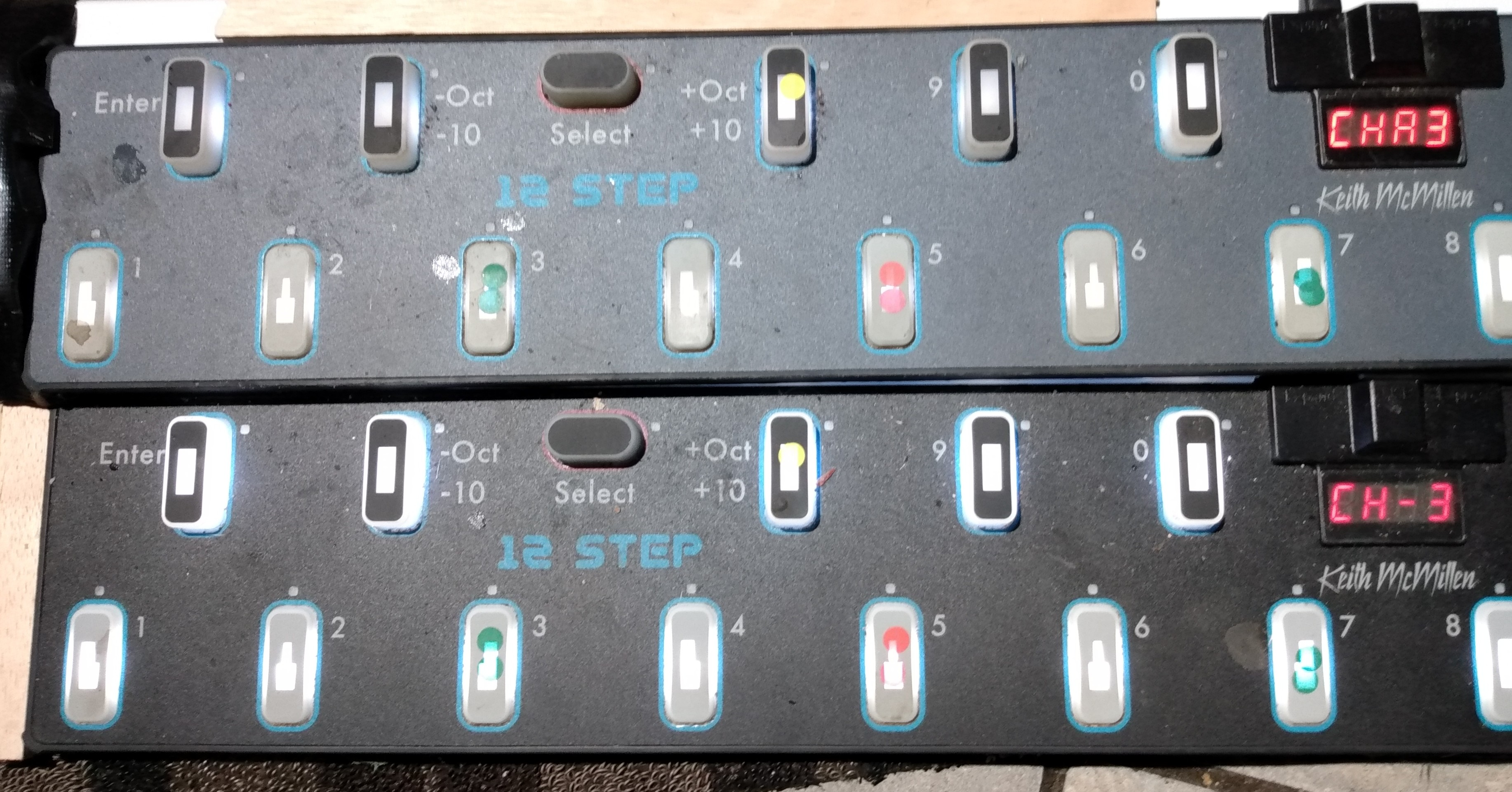
More than one 12 Step can be used with one synthesizer. In this set-up, two 12 Steps are MIDI merged into the same synthesizer. The top unit is programmed to play major dyads and the bottom unit is programmed to play minor dyads. Combinations of keypresses from these two 12 Steps, which can be sustained using the synth's damper pedal, can produce major, minor, dominant seventh, diminished, and augmented chords.

The pedal keyboard of the 12 Step has 13 button-style keys laid out in a musical keyboard fashion, appearing like the layout of the chromatic octave starting on C on a piano keyboard. The notes that would be the black keys (accidentals) on a piano keyboard are raised. There is also an "Enter" button which is used to access other commands (when the "Enter" button is activated, the pedal keyboard notes temporarily turn into command buttons to change the preset, registration bank (a group of presets, much like one might see in a digital pipe organ, or change octaves up or down)).

The 12 Step is USB plug-and-play, which means that it can be plugged directly into a compatible computer without needing software drivers. As such, a musician with a virtual instrument on her computer could play scales and melodies using the virtual instrument just by plugging the 12 Step into a USB port on the computer. The 12 Step can be plugged directly into some 2010s-era synth modules and hardware electronic instruments that have USB ports.

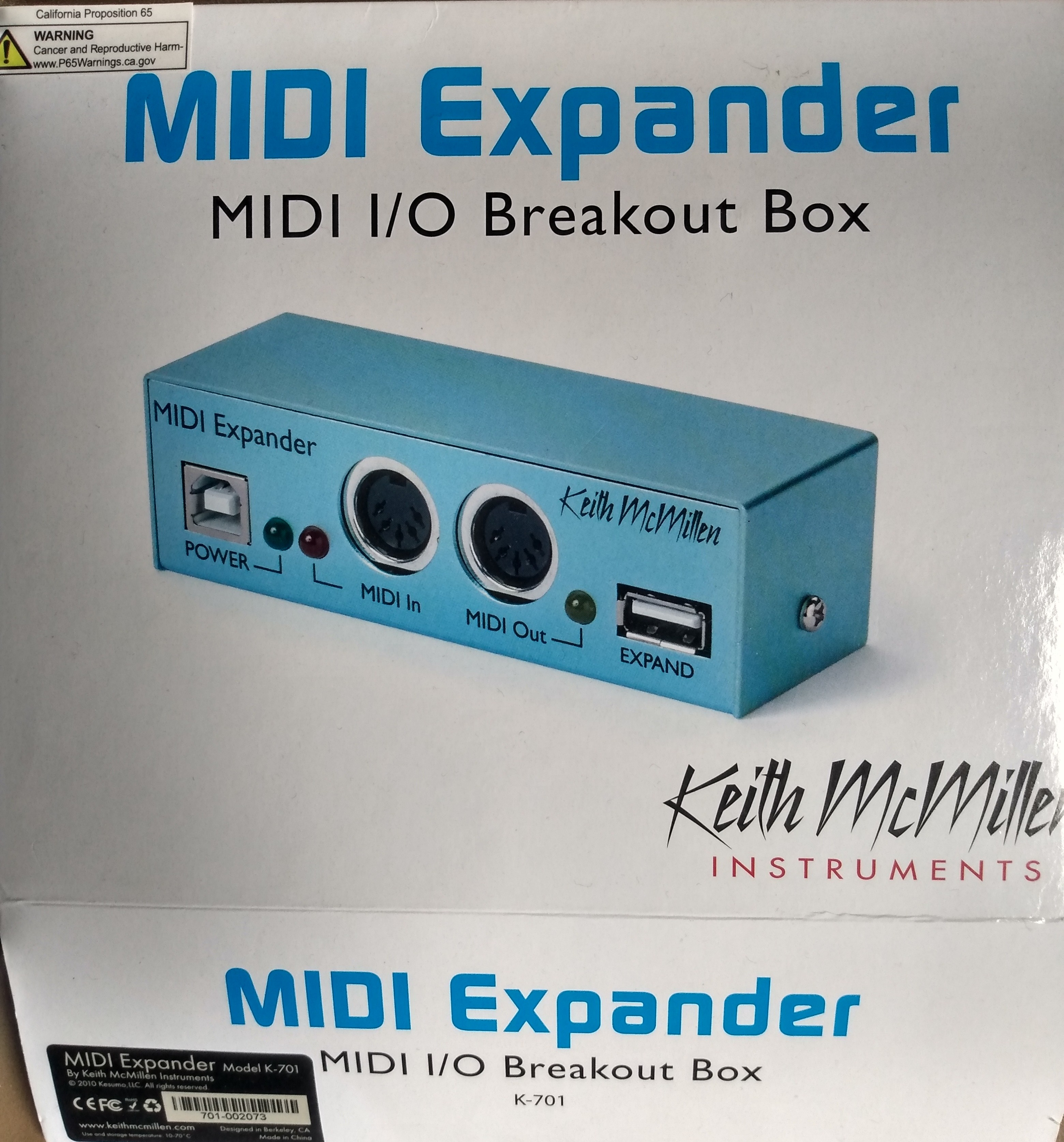
A Keith McMilllen MIDI expander, which the package describes as a "MIDI I/O breakout box". It can be used to connect the 12 Step to 1980s-era MIDI devices.

The 12 Step can be used to play 1980s and 1990s-era synthesizers and hardware instruments that are pre-USB (e.g., a DX-7 synth or drum machine) or which do not have a USB connection, and which only have 5-pin MIDI connectors by using the KMI MIDI Expander, a Keith McMillen Instruments-made unit that is sold separately. The KMI MIDI Expander is a small metal-cased unit with jacks for 5-pin MIDI cable "in" and "out" and USB connectors for power from a wall outlet and to connect to the 12 Step, and LEDs that light up when MIDI messages are sent in or out of the unit. The MIDI expander transforms the 12 Step's USB output to MIDI messages that can be sent over 5-pin MIDI connectors.

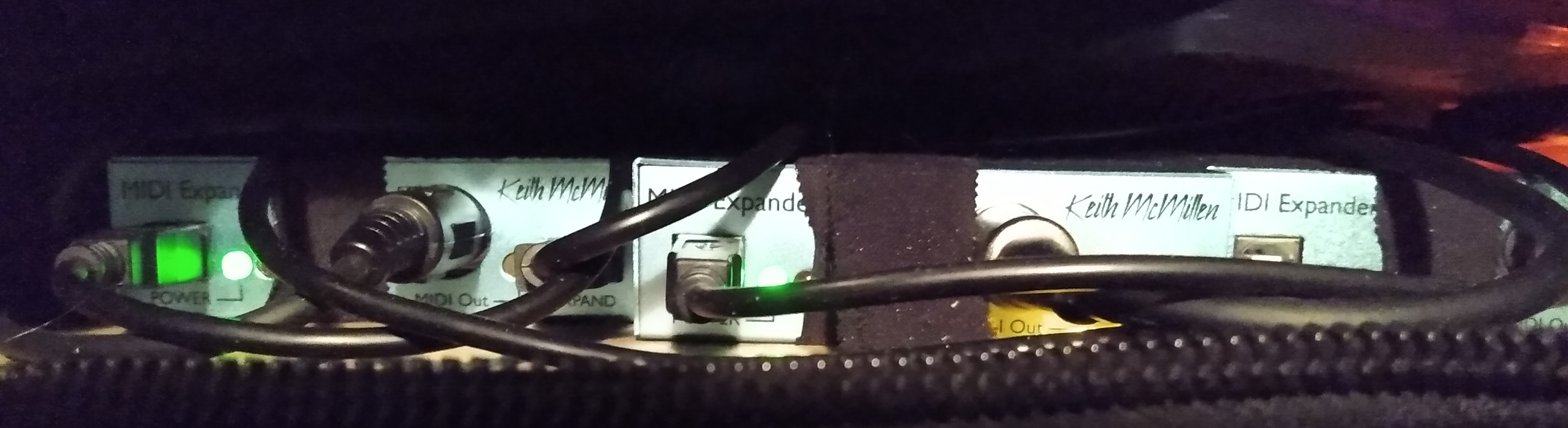
These three Keith McMillen MIDI expander boxes convert USB messages to MIDI 5-pin format, so that they can be connected to older synthesizers.

Each of the keys on the 12 Step have bright white backlighting from an LED, so the keys can be seen on a dark stage. As well, each key has a red LED light that turns on if you press the key, to help you know if you are pressing the intended key. The keys have no moving parts; instead, they have sensors embedded into soft, rubbery keys. The keys sense velocity (how hard or soft the foot hits the key), poly aftertouch pressure (whether or not your foot continues to press the key after the initial strike, which can be used to add nuance to sustained notes, such as by triggering vibrato or other effects) and pitch bend (a gliding glissando sound). It weighs 1.0 lb (453 g) and measures 17.5 x 4 x 0.75" (445 x 102 x 19mm). The pedal keyboard cannot be used below 10 °C (50 °F).

The keyboard can be set to play one note only, or set to a "poly" mode, which can sound multiple notes at the same time. The "one note only" setting has long been a standard feature of pedal keyboards intended for use playing basslines, because in many cases, having two bass notes sounding simultaneously can be unduly "muddy".

Each preset also has settings for legato, hold, or "toggle". In "Legato" mode, it is like playing a piano with the damper pedal pressed; each note you press keeps sustaining. The programming automatically replaces any subsequent note in a smooth, seamless legato fashion. If you press the middle button, it mutes any lingering notes or chords. "Toggle" allows the user to switch between modes.

One feature in the 12 Step not found in other MIDI foot controllers is that each key can be programmed to play up to five notes. This way, a violin player performing a pop song as a one man band could program the 12 Step keys to play the chords she needs. For example, the C button could be programmed to play a C major triad chord, the D key could play a d minor triad, the G key could play a G dominant seventh chord, the A key could play an "a minor" seventh chord, and so on.

Since the chords and notes are user- programmed, the chord voicings for these chords could cover multiple octaves. A bass player in a power trio could program the 12 Step to play power chords, enabling her to provide chordal accompaniment for the lead guitarist's guitar solo with her feet while she plays bass with her hands.

While the presets often provide chords in close voicing (all notes within an octave), there are no technical restrictions on octaves for programming (at least within the standard range of MIDI notes). As such, open voicing chords can be programmed, such as jazz chord voicings that add higher extensions (e.g. 11ths or 13ths). As well, since the chords are programmed, there are none of the limitations that a human keyboard player might face; the 12 Step can perform 10ths, 11ths, and 13ths in keys that would be challenging or impossible for a pianist to play with one hand.

As well, since the 12 Step allows users to program any combination of five notes per rubbery key, the 12 Step could also be used to provide a deep sub-bass note and a four note chord in a standard accompaniment register (i.e. around middle C on a piano). A 12 Step programmed in this fashion could provide a one-man band with a simple bass part and chordal accompaniment with four-note chords.

The first preset is a chromatic scale starting in C. But even users who only want to play individual notes are not limited to that scale or arrangement. The user could create presets for all of the different keys that they use, so that the keys of the 12 Step could be used to play in different musical keys, while maintaining the familiar C major pattern. For example, if a performer wished to play a song in C♯ Major, the entire chromatic scale of the 12 Step could be transposed up a semitone. Thus, by playing the song using the keys (the buttons on the 12 Step) for C Major, the synthesizer would produce a sound transposed to C♯ Major. The presets are designed to include power chord settings designed with electric guitarists in mind; as such, the lowest note is transposed to E, to match the guitar's low E string. Whatever is programmed into the keys, whether it is individual notes or chords, can be transposed up or down by several octaves by using the "Select" key and then pressing the octave up or octave down keys (which are the regular note keys, which serve as function buttons once the "Select" button is engaged).

The back of the 12 Step has several connectors: a 1/8" expression pedal input, a USB port for connecting to the optional MIDI expander unit, and a USB port for connecting to a computer or hardware electronic device (synth module, sequencer, etc.). Each key has a little red LED light that illuminates when the key is pressed, which helps the performer confirm which note they have pressed. A small alphanumeric LED panel can show up to four characters (some of the preset names include "bEnD", "POLY" and "5OCt" (the last one for a five octave preset) (see list of 12 Step presets. The drumset preset ("dSEt") automatically transmits to the General MIDI electronic drums channel. The keys on the 12 Step sound drum and cymbal sounds in this setting. The 12 Step V2 also has a CV output and a TRS MIDI output.

The 12 Step has 59 factory presets, such as a chromatic scale, major chords, minor chords, suspended fourth ("sus") chords, power chords, diatonic chords (in the key of C major, this would be the chords C major, d minor, e minor, F Major, G7 and so on), to name a few. The user can program and save up to 128 presets (in total, so to get all 128 presets as user-programmed presets, the factory presets would have to be replaced) and give them names that will appear on the display panel. The user can select factory or user-created presets by pressing the "Select" key and then pressing the numbered keys (the keys C, D, E, F, G, A, B and the high C that are usually played, which become function keys numbered 1 through 8 when the "Select" button is engaged and its LED is flashing.

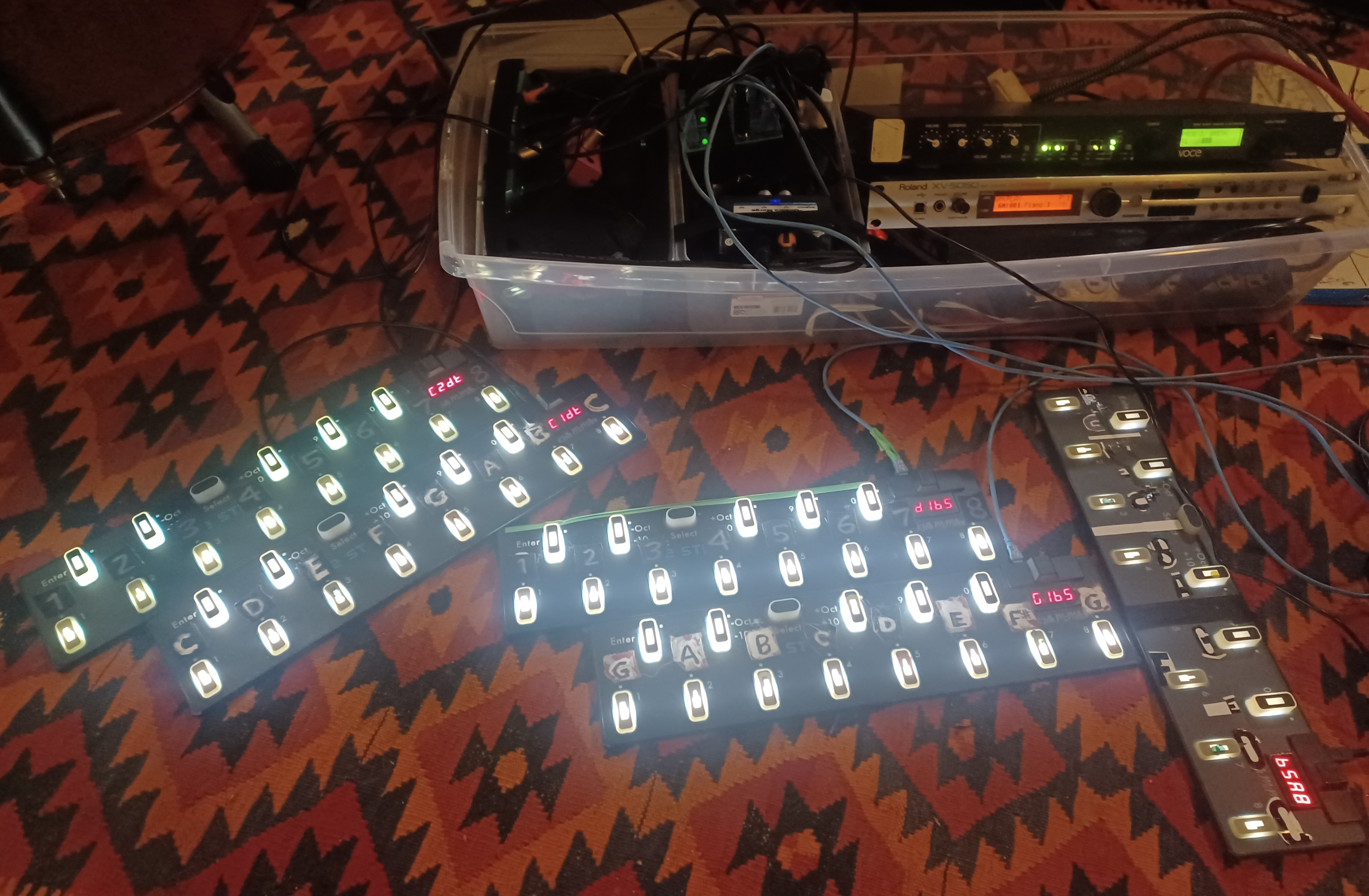
Five 12 Step pedal keyboards connected to sound modules. Two are plugged into a Roland synthesizer sound module via MIDI, using KM MIDI expanders and a MIDI merge unit. Three are plugged into a VOCE tonewheel organ synthesizer via MIDI using the same approach.

The user can program the 12 Step to do a "program change" when a certain preset is selected. Using this feature, a user could program the 12 Step to send a program change message to their synthesizer module, selecting a certain synth patch or sound when a certain 12 Step preset is chosen. For example, a user could program the 12 Step to change their synth module to an electric bass sound when the "BASS" 12 Step preset is selected.

The user needs to download the free 12 Step Editor program to do programming of new presets or make changes to the unit's settings (such as the touch sensitivity of the keys), using a laptop, desktop or tablet computer.

The 12 Step gets its power from the USB bus from the computer it is plugged into or from the Expander unit's port (the Expander is powered by a wall adapter).

== List of factory presets ==
The factory presets include scales, dyads (two notes played simultaneously), chords, and articulation changes and other functions. The names that are provided are the preset names that appear in the four-character LED display on the 12 Step. Users can change the display names using the 12 Step editing software (which must be used on a computer).

=== Scales ===
These include CHrO ("Chromatic Scale"), which automatically loads when 12 Step powers up; LEAd ("Blues Lead"); bLUE ("Blues Bass"); PEnt ("Major Pentatonic"); and -Pnt ("Minor Pentatonic").

=== Dyads ===
The presets include wide range of dyads, which are two notes that are sounded simultaneously.

OCt ("Octave"); 5OCt ("5 Octaves"); -3rd ("Minor 3rds"); 3rd ("Major 3rds"); dIA3 ("Diatonic 3rds"); 4tHS ("4ths"); dIA4 ("Diatonic 4ths"); StC4 ("Stacked 4ths"); 5tHS ("5ths"); dIA5 ("Diatonic 5ths"); StC5 ("Stacked 5ths"); -6tH ("Minor 6ths"); 6tHS ("Major 6ths"); dIA6 ("Diatonic 6ths"); -7tH ("Minor 7ths"); 7tHS ("Major 7ths"); -9tH ("Minor 9ths"); 9tHS ("Major 9ths"); 10S ("Minor 10ths"); 10tH ("Major 10ths"); trtn ("Tritone").

=== Chords ===
Some of the chord presets also have an articulation or playing style feature which is turned on simultaneously, such as POtG, "Power Chords Toggle", which sets up power chords for each key of the 12 Step, while also activating the "toggle" playing feature. Some of the chord presets are designed for musicians and bands that use Drop D tuning.

EPO ("Power Chords Legato"); SUS9 ("Sus9 Chords")-trd ("Minor Triads"); trAd ("Major Triads"); dtrd ("Diatonic Triads"; -145 ("1-4-5-7 Minor Chords"); 1457 ("1-4-5-7 Major Chords"); dI ("Diminished Chords"); AUG ("Augmented Triads"); PO ("Power Chords Normal"); POtG ("Power Chords Toggle"); InPO ("Inverted Power Chords"); d_LO ("Drop D −12"); drOP ("Drop D Legato"); -6CH ("Minor 6th Chords"); 6CHd ("Major 6th Chords"); -FL7 ("Minor 7 Chords"); FLt7 ("Dominant 7 Chords"); dI7C ("Diatonic 7th Chords (Major)"); SUS4 ("Sus 4 Chords").

=== Articulation or other functions ===
Notable presets in this group are CLIP ("Live Clip Launching), which is set up to launch sound clips in Ableton Live; and A__b ("2 Voices"), which enables one 12 Step to control two different synth voices (or two different synth modules) on two different MIDI channels.

bEnD ("Tilt Pitch Bend"); LGtO ("Legato"); tOGL ("Toggle"); PrES ("Pressure Volume"); CLIP ("Live Clip Launching); POLY ("Polyphonic") AFtr ("Poly Aftertouch"); A__b ("2 Voices"); CrOS ("Voice XFade"); PAn ("Key Number Panning"); dSEt ("Drum Set").

== Reception ==
Kev Choice and Albert Mathias, the reviewers from Keyboard Mag, call the 12 Step a "...welcome alternative to heavy, cumbersome foot controllers" that are hard to program. The reviewers state that the manual and software editor program are "...well written and clear". They state that playing some basslines on the small keys, such as "...walking bass lines, for example, might make one wish for shoes with bigger heels or pointier tips", and they suggest sitting down to play the instrument. The reviewers state that the 12 Step is easy to use with Propellerhead, Reason and Ableton Live. They say that in addition to its usefulness for pianists and other instrumentalists, it has potential for use by "...deejays, emcees, or anyone on stage responsible for triggering samples or generating tones".

Alex Maiolo from Tape Op had a positive review of the 12 Step, which noted that "most [foot controllers] are expensive and bulky", making them infeasible for the typical musician who only needs occasional foot-triggered notes. He calls it a "...quick, cheap, easy, reliable, portable bass pedal solution" . He noted that given that bands in the mid-2010s are touring with smaller numbers of personnel, yet still trying to recreate their studio recording sounds in live shows, the 12 Step could solve this problem, as it can be used as a "clip launcher for hardware and software samplers".

Juan Alderete and Nick Reinhart from Pedals and Effects were pleased that Keith McMillen is making a variety of lightweight music gear for travelling musicians and they positively note the 12 Step's "bullet proof" and durable construction. They note that since "...most bands these days seem to be either two or three musicians, the 12 Step is a great way to step up your band's sound" by adding "Moog bass, or control samples via my feet", so a band can "sound like [they] do on the record" in live shows.

Reviewer Nick Batt demonstrated and commented on the 12 Step in a 2012 video review for SonicState. Batt praised the 12 Step, saying "a lot of thought has gone into it", and he stated that as of 2012, no other MIDI foot controller offered the same level of sophisticated control options (apart from the McMillen SoftStep). Batt states that he found pressing the small keys hard while wearing shoes, but he acknowledged that there are Hammond organists who have made videos of themselves playing rapid organ basslines on the 12 Step. He said the strong point of the unit is its "potential for customizable control" of computer music applications such as Ableton, such as triggering clips or "scenes", particularly for solo performers or one man bands.

In Sam Mallery's review for B&H Photo, he calls Keith McMillen Instruments "...among the most innovative and forward-thinking manufacturers in the pro audio industry today" and says that it is "no surprise that the 12 Step is so intelligently designed and easy to use". He praises the "...illuminated and expressive keys" and states that musicians and DJs will find the 12 Step useful for shows.
