= Pedal keyboard =

Musical keyboard played with the feet, usually used for low-pitched notes

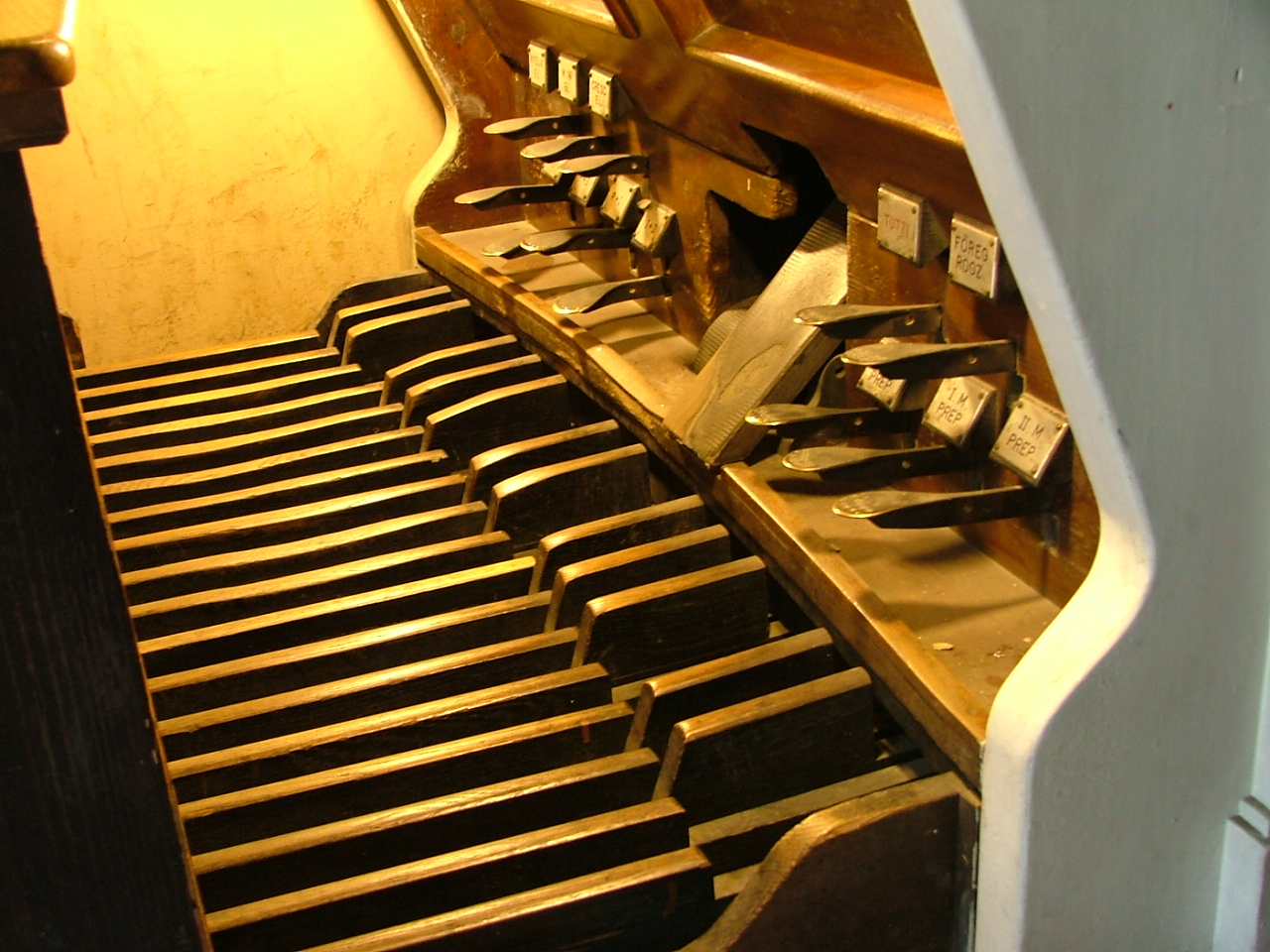
The 30-note pedalboard of a Rieger organ

A pedalboard (also called a pedal keyboard, pedal clavier, or, with electronic instruments, a bass pedalboard) is a keyboard played with the feet that is usually used to produce the low-pitched bass line of a piece of music. A pedalboard has long, narrow lever-style keys laid out in the same semitone scalar pattern as a manual keyboard, with longer keys for C, D, E, F, G, A, and B, and shorter, raised keys for C♯, D♯, F♯, G♯ and A♯. Training in pedal technique is part of standard organ pedagogy in church music and art music.

Pedalboards are found at the base of the console of most pipe organs, pedal pianos, theatre organs, and electronic organs. Standalone pedalboards such as the 1970s-era Moog Taurus bass pedals are occasionally used in progressive rock and fusion music. In the 21st century, MIDI pedalboard controllers are used with synthesizers, electronic Hammond-style organs, and with digital pipe organs. Pedalboards are also used with pedal pianos and with some harpsichords, clavichords, and carillons (church bells).

== History ==
=== 13th century to 16th century ===
The first use of pedals on a pipe organ grew out of the need to hold bass drone notes, to support the polyphonic musical styles that predominated in the Renaissance. Indeed, the term pedal point, which refers to a prolonged bass tone under changing upper harmonies, derives from the use of the organ pedalboard to hold sustained bass notes. These earliest pedals were wooden stubs nicknamed mushrooms, which were placed at the height of the feet. These pedals, which used simple pull-downs connected directly to the manual keys, are found in organs dating to the 13th century. The pedals on French organs were composed of short stubs of wood projecting out of the floor, which were mounted in pedalboards that could be either flat or tilted. Organists were unable to play anything but simple bass lines or slow-moving plainsong melodies on these short stub-type pedals. Organist E. Power Biggs, in the liner notes for his album Organs of Spain noted that "One can learn to play them, but fluent pedal work is impossible".

A diagram of one type of "short octave" as used on a manual keyboard; while this exact layout was not used on pedalboards, it shows the different note layouts that were used on some instruments

There were two approaches used for the accidental notes (colloquially referred to as the "black" notes). The first approach can be seen in the 1361 Halberstadt organ, which uses shorter black keys placed above the white keys. Other organs positioned the black keys on the same level and depth as the white keys. The first pedal keyboards only had three or four notes. Eventually, organ designers augmented this range by using eight notes, an approach now called a "short octave" keyboard, because it does not include accidental notes such as C♯, D♯, F♯, G♯, and A♯. The 17th-century north German organ builder Arp Schnitger used an F♯ and G♯ in the lowest octave of the manuals and pedal keyboards, but not a C♯ and D♯. From the 16th to 18th centuries, short octave keyboards were also used in the lowest octave of upper manual keyboards.

By the 14th century, organ designers were building separate windchests for the pedal division, to supply the pipes with the large amount of wind that bass notes need to speak. These windchests were often built into tall structures called "organ towers". Until the 15th century, most pedal keyboards only triggered the existing Hauptwerk pipes already used by the upper manual keyboards. Beginning in the 15th century, some organ designers began giving pedal keyboards their own set of pipes and stops. In the 15th and 16th centuries, the pedal division usually consisted of a few 8′ ranks and a single 16′ rank. By the early 17th century, pedal divisions became more complex, with a richer variety of pipes and tones. Nevertheless, the pedal division was usually inconsistent from one country to another.

=== 17th century to 18th century ===
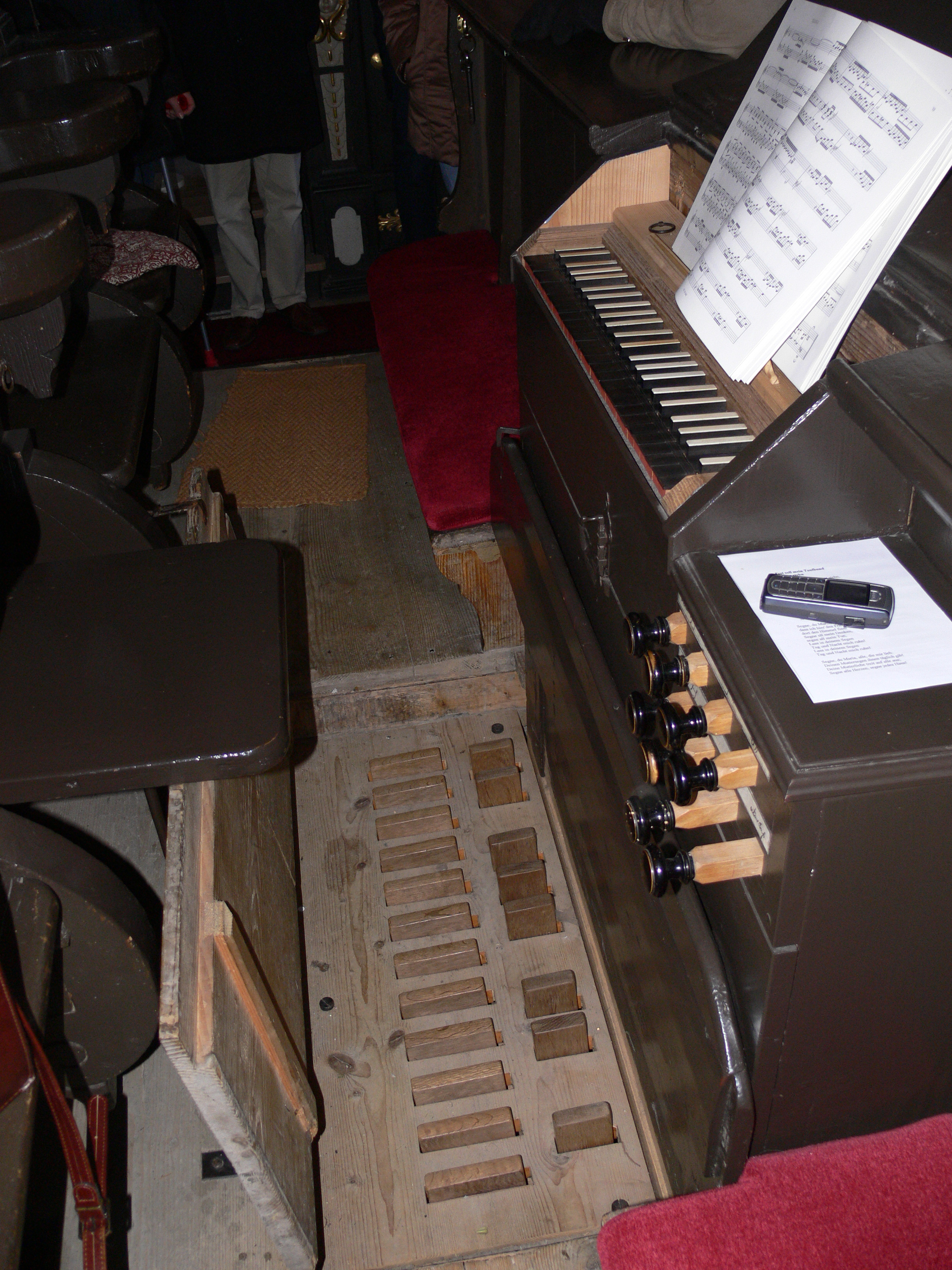
This 1609 organ shows the short, button-style pedals of early pedal setups

By the beginning of the 17th century, organ designers began to give pedalboards on large organs a larger range, encompassing twenty-eight to thirty notes. As well, German organ designers began to use longer, narrower pedals, with a wider space between the pedals. By this point, most pedals were given a smoother lever-action by including a fulcrum at the back of each pedal. These design changes allowed performers to play more complex, fast-moving pedal lines. This gave rise to the dramatic pedal solos found in German organ works from composers from the North German organ school, such as Dieterich Buxtehude, Johann Adam Reincken and J.S. Bach. In Bach's organ music the cantus firmus melody, which is usually a hymn tune, is often performed in the pedal, using a reed stop to make it stand out.

Several sources, including an encyclopedia on the organ, claim that the pedalboard design improvements of the 17th century allowed the organist to actuate the pedals either with the toe of the foot or with the heel. However, organist Ton Koopman argues that "Bach's complete oeuvre [can be played] with the pedal technique of his time, in other words without the use of the heel." Koopman claims that in "Bach's day toe and heel pedalling was not yet known, as is evident from his organ works, in which all the pedal parts can be played with the toe." What evolved as the "German" pedal technique in the late 18th and early 19th century promoted heel-and-toe pedaling, while the "French" style was predicated on the "toe only" pedal technique.

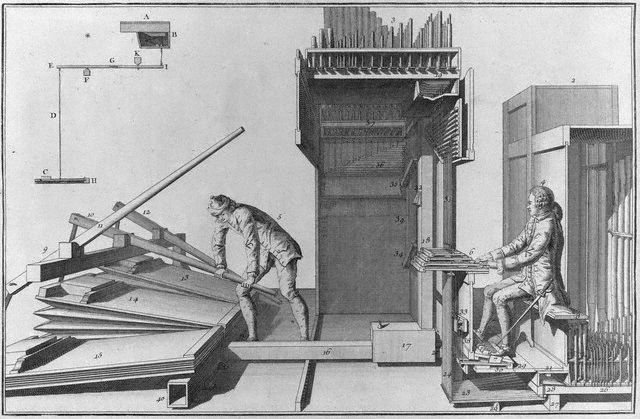
This 1776 diagram depicts the setup of the manuals and pedal keyboard

In the 17th and 18th centuries, pedalboards were rare in England. A critic for the New York Times in 1895 argued that this may explain why Handel's published organ works are generally lighter-sounding than those of J.S. Bach. In the 17th and 18th centuries, the pedal part of organ music was rarely given its own staff. Instead, the organ part would be put into two staves, which were mostly used for the upper and lower manual parts. When the composer wanted a part played with the pedal keyboard, they marked Pedal, Ped., or simply P. Often, composers omitted these signs, and player had to decide if the range of all the parts or the lowest part was appropriate for the pedal keyboard. This lack of specification is in keeping with many other aspects of Baroque musical performance practice, such as the use of improvised chords by organists and harpsichord players in the figured bass tradition and the use of improvised ornaments by solo singers and instrumentalists.

=== 19th century to 20th century ===
In the late 1820s, the pedalboard was still fairly unfamiliar in the UK. In the organ at the Church of St James at Bermondsey in 1829, "a finger [manual] keyboard was added for those unable to play with their feet." If an organist was performing a piece with a pedal part, "an assistant was needed to play the bottom line of the finger keyboard, offset on the bass side of the console." In 1855 in England, Henry Willis patented a concave design for the pedalboard that also radiated the ends keyboard outward and used longer keys, bringing the end keys closer to the performer. This design became common in the UK and in the US in the late 19th century, and by 1903, the American Guild of Organists (AGO) adopted it as their standard.

In the 19th century and early 20th century, the pedal division also underwent changes. The pedal divisions of the Baroque era often included a small number of higher-pitched stops, which allowed performers to perform higher melodies on the pedalboard. In the 19th century and early 20th century, organ designers omitted most of these higher-pitched stops, and used pedal divisions which were dominated by 8′ and 16′ stops. This design change, which coincided with the musical trend for music with a deep, rich bass part, meant that players used the pedalboard mainly for bass parts.

By the mid-19th century, the pedal part of organ music was increasingly given its own staff, which meant that composers and transcribers began writing organ music in three-stave systems (right hand, left hand, and pedal keyboard). Whereas early organ composers left the way that pedal keyboard lines were played to the player's discretion, in the later 19th century, composers began to indicate specific foot actions.

In addition to telling the organist whether to use the left or right foot, symbols indicate whether they should use the toe or heel. A "^" symbol indicates the toe, and a "u" or "o" indicates the heel. Symbols below notes indicate the left foot, and above notes indicates the right foot.

Swedish organist L. Nilson published a method for the pedal keyboard, the English translation of which was titled A System of Technical Studies in Pedal Playing for the Organ (Schirmer, 1904). Nilson lamented that it "...is a melancholy fact that only very few eminent organists since Bach's time have made it their business to lift pedal-playing out of its primitive confusion..." (page 1 of Preface). He argued that the great organ pedagogues such as Kittel and Abbe Vogler did not make any efforts to improve the "...system of playing on the pedals". Nilson makes one exception from this critique: the organ method of J. Lemmens, who he praises as having reformed pedal playing by introducing "...sound principles of execution" (page 2 of Preface). Nilson's pedal method includes scale and arpeggio studies, polyphonic studies with both feet playing in contrary motion, studies written in parallel octaves, and studies written in thirds.

=== 1990s–2000s ===
In the 1990s, standalone electronic MIDI controller pedalboards became widely available on the market. MIDI pedalboards do not produce any tones by themselves, and so they must be connected to a MIDI-compatible electronic keyboard or MIDI sound module and an amplified loudspeaker to produce musical tones. In the 1990s and 21st century, some churches began using electronic-trigger equipped pedalboards for the 16′ and 32′ stops, because electronic synthesizer bass tones, amplifier, and subwoofer speakers are less expensive than wooden or metal wind-driven pipes. The MIDI information from the electronic pedalboard sensors triggers pipe organ sounds from digital sound modules (e.g., Wicks CM-100, Ahlborn Archive Modules, or Walker Technical sound generation), which are then amplified through loudspeakers.

These MIDI systems can be much less expensive than metal or wooden bass pipes, which are costly to purchase and install, due to their heavy weight (up to one ton per pipe), large size, and need for large amounts of wind. Another rationale for using MIDI systems is that it may be easier to get a focused sound with a MIDI system, because all of the bass tone emanates from a single speaker or set of speakers. With traditional pipes, it can be difficult to give the pedal division a focused sound, because the large pipes tend to be spread out over the entire organ pipe chest.

This cost-saving measure has been the subject of controversy in the organ scene. Advocates of MIDI pedal divisions argue that a good quality MIDI system produces a better tone than an inexpensive set of bass pipes with money-saving "shortcuts" such as using stopped pipes and resultant tones to reduce the number of required pipes. However, critics dislike the way that the use of MIDI pedal divisions blends electronically amplified lower voices with the natural, wind-driven upper ranks. Willi Apel and Peter Williams argue that by definition, an organ must make its sound by air flowing through pipes. Some critics argue that the bass tone from a MIDI pedal division, which comes from an amplified 12-inch subwoofer, is not as "natural" and "open-sounding" as the vibrations from a massive, wind-driven 32-foot pipe.

== Design ==
=== Keyboards ===
Pedalboards range in size from 13 notes on small spinet organs designed for in-home use (an octave, conventionally C_{2}–C_{3}) to 42 notes (three and a half octaves, G_{1}–C_{5}) on church or concert organs. Modern pipe organs typically have 30- or 32-note pedalboards, while some electronic organs and many older pipe organs have 25-note pedalboards.

Besides the number of pedals, the two main identifying aspects of a pedalboard are:

1. whether all the pedals are at the same height relative to the floor ("flat"), or whether the pedals in the middle are lower than those on the outer edges, forming a curved-in shape ("concave"), and
2. whether all the pedals are completely parallel to each other ("parallel"), or whether the pedals are closer together at the far end than at the end closest to the organ console ("radiating"). Specifications vary by country, organ builder, era, and individual tastes.

Exact design specifications for pedalboards are published in Great Britain by the RCO, in the United States by the AGO (which requires a design similar to the RCO's), and in Germany by the BDO (which allows both 30- and 32-note pedalboards, of both concave/radiating and concave/parallel varieties).

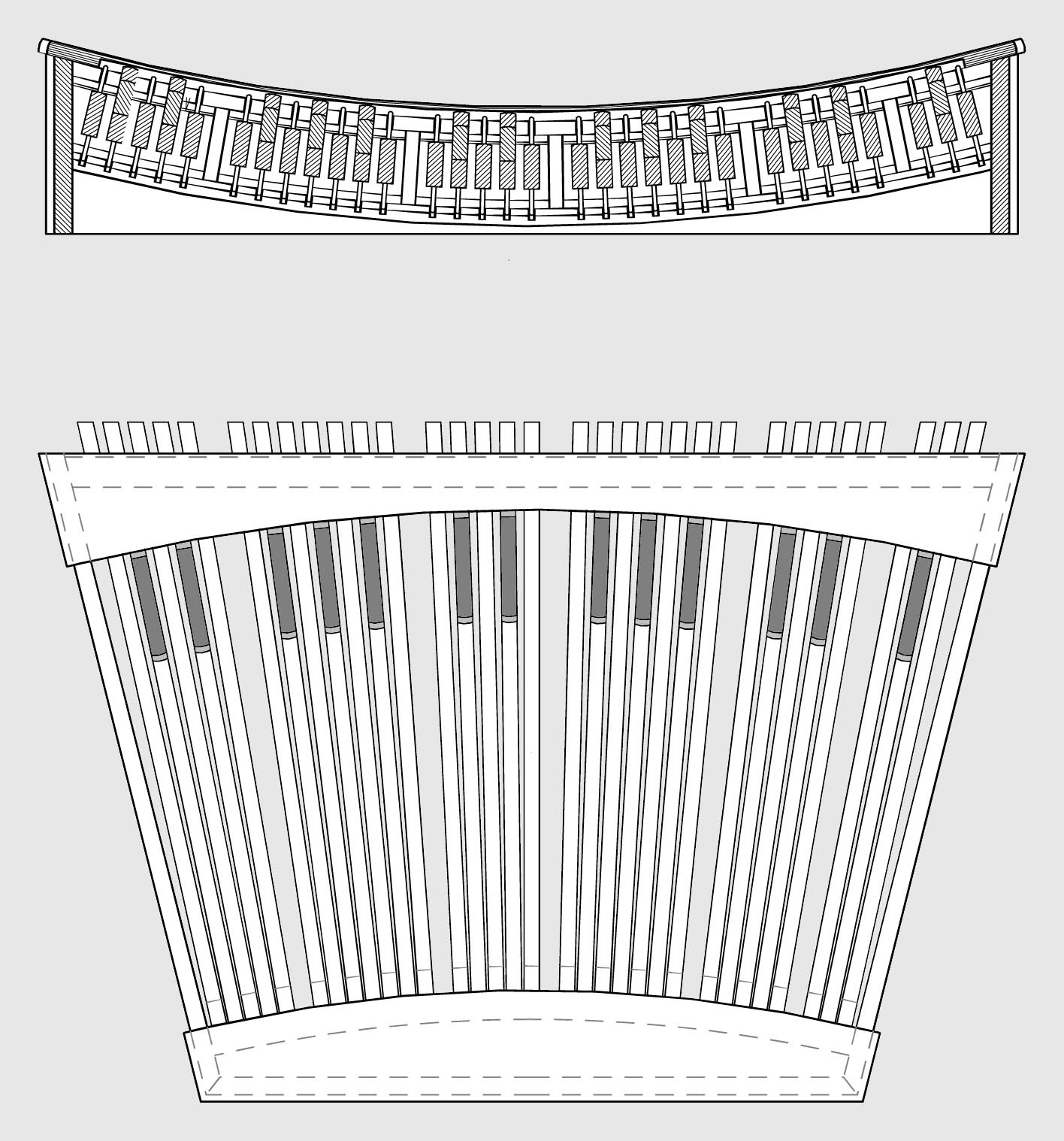
AGO-spec.: concave/radiating

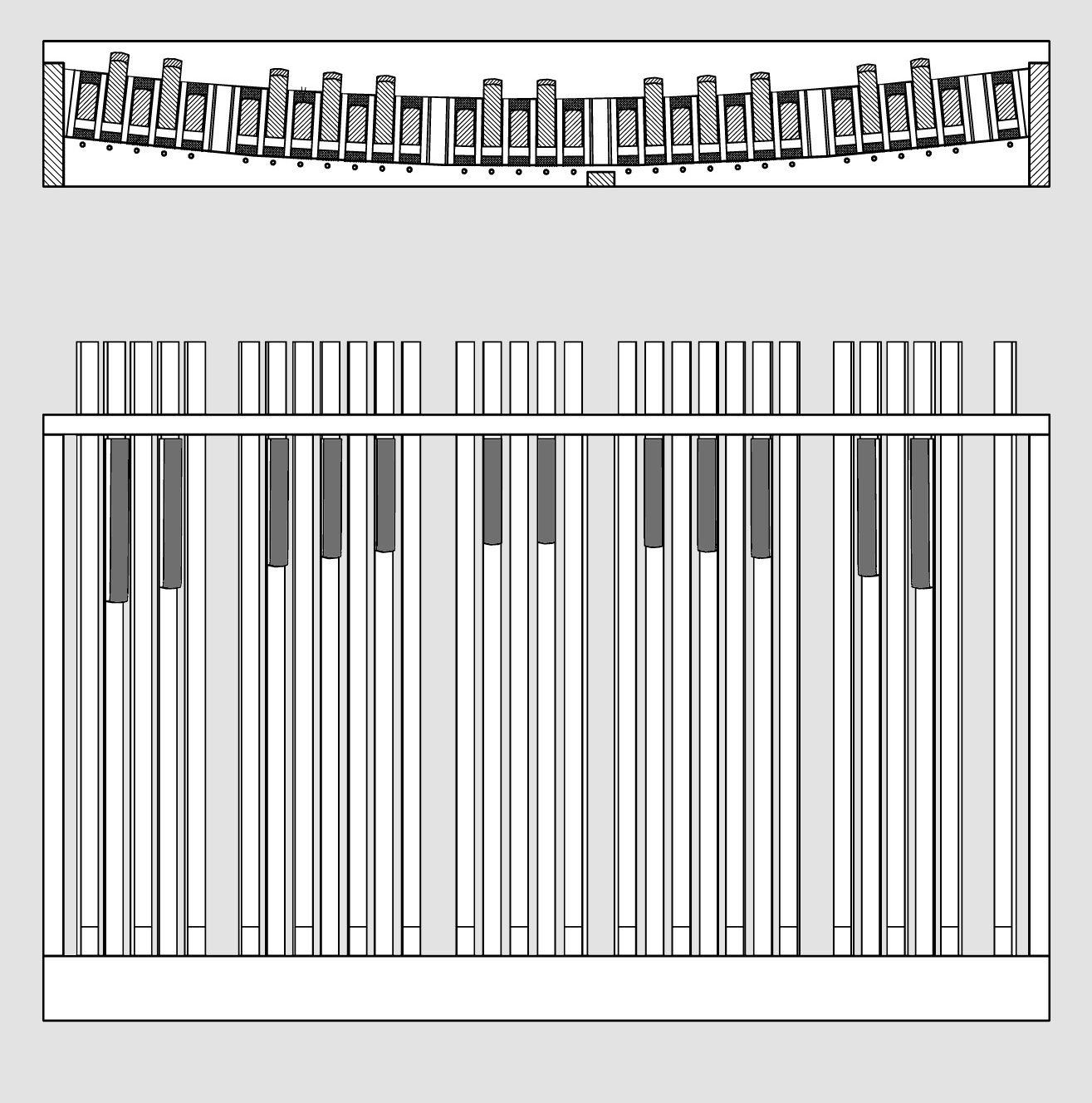
BDO-spec.: concave/parallel

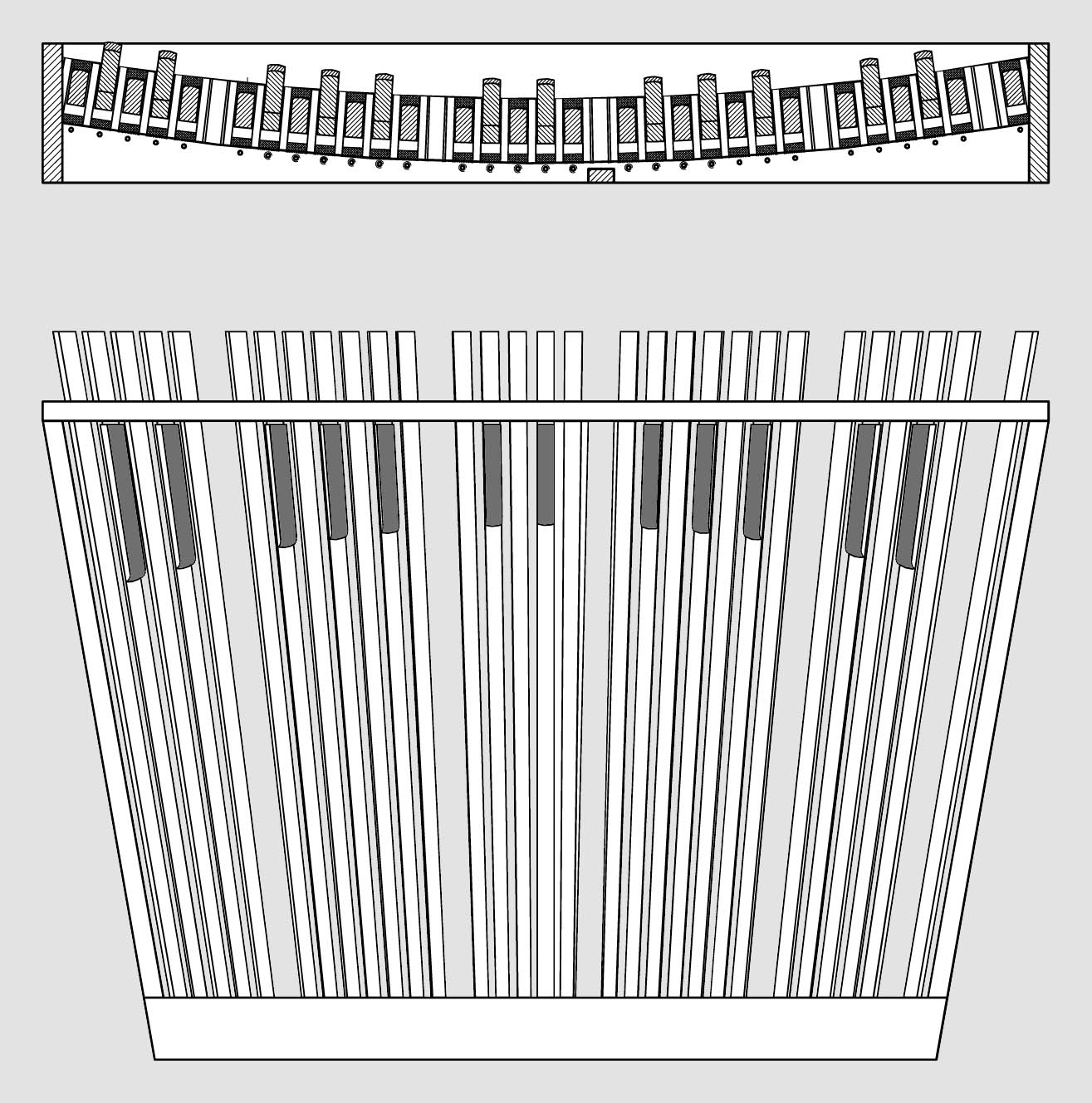
BDO-spec.: concave/radiating

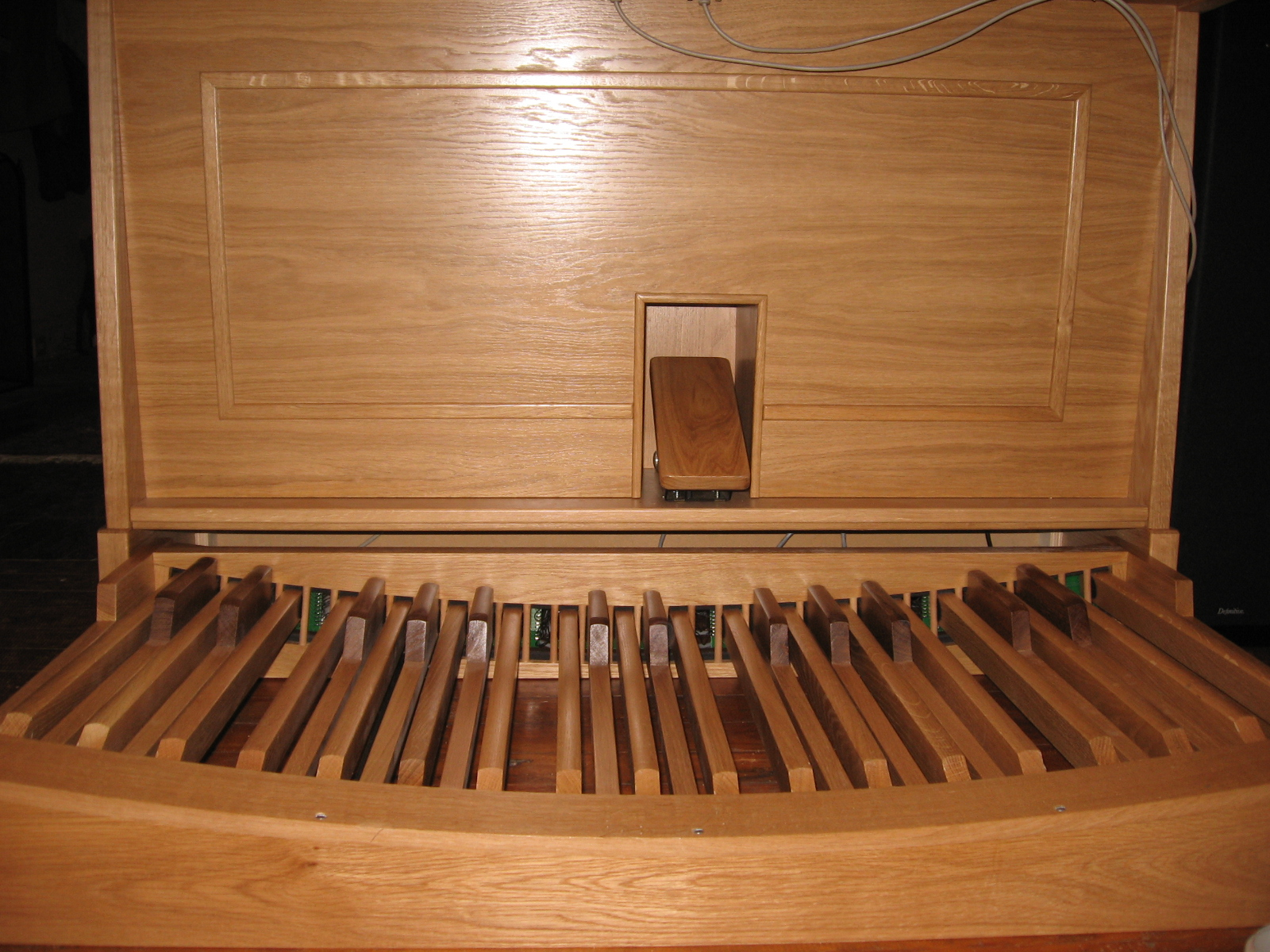
30-note BDO Standard (concave/parallel) pedalboard.

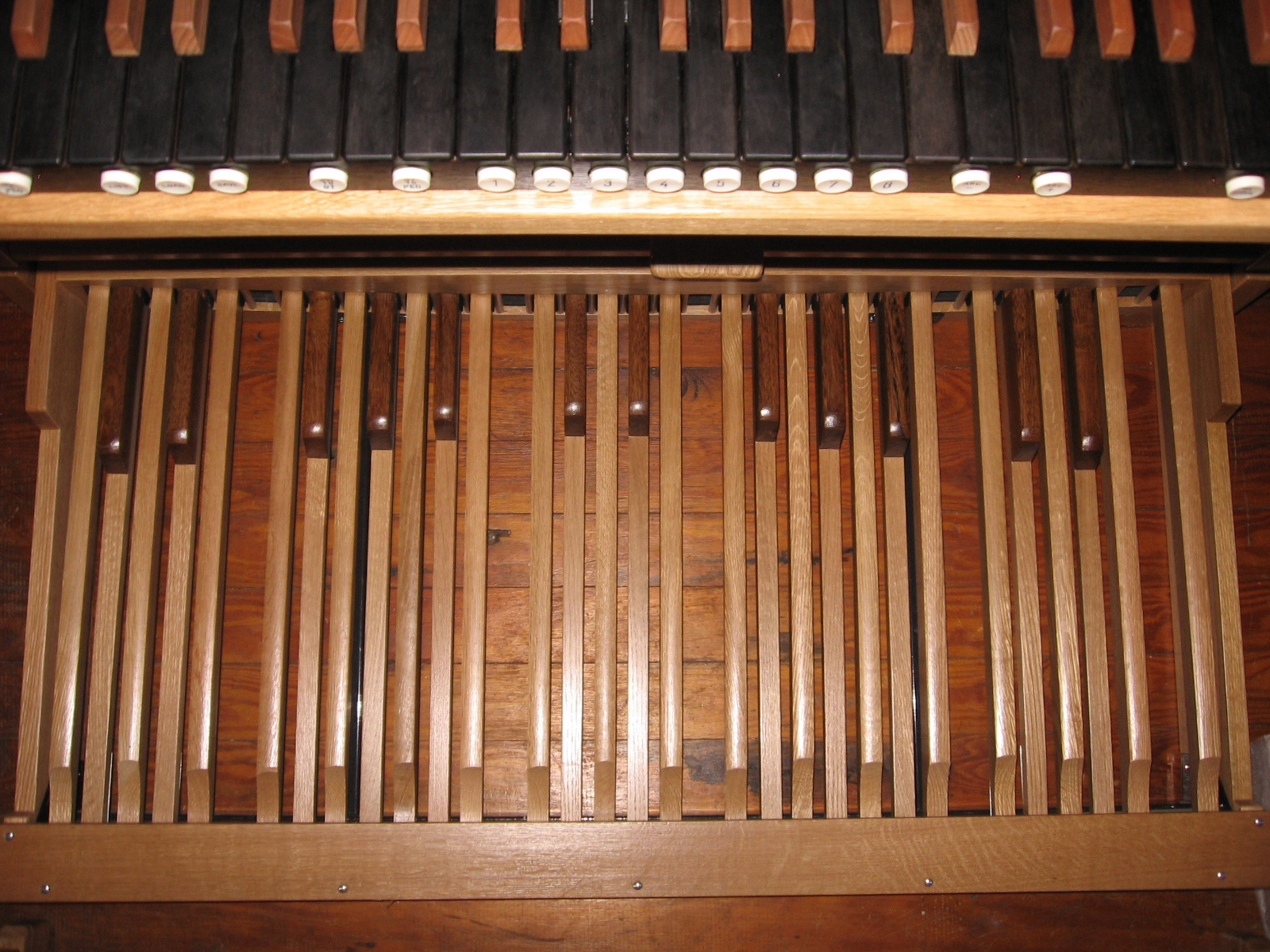
30-note BDO Standard (concave/parallel) pedalboard.

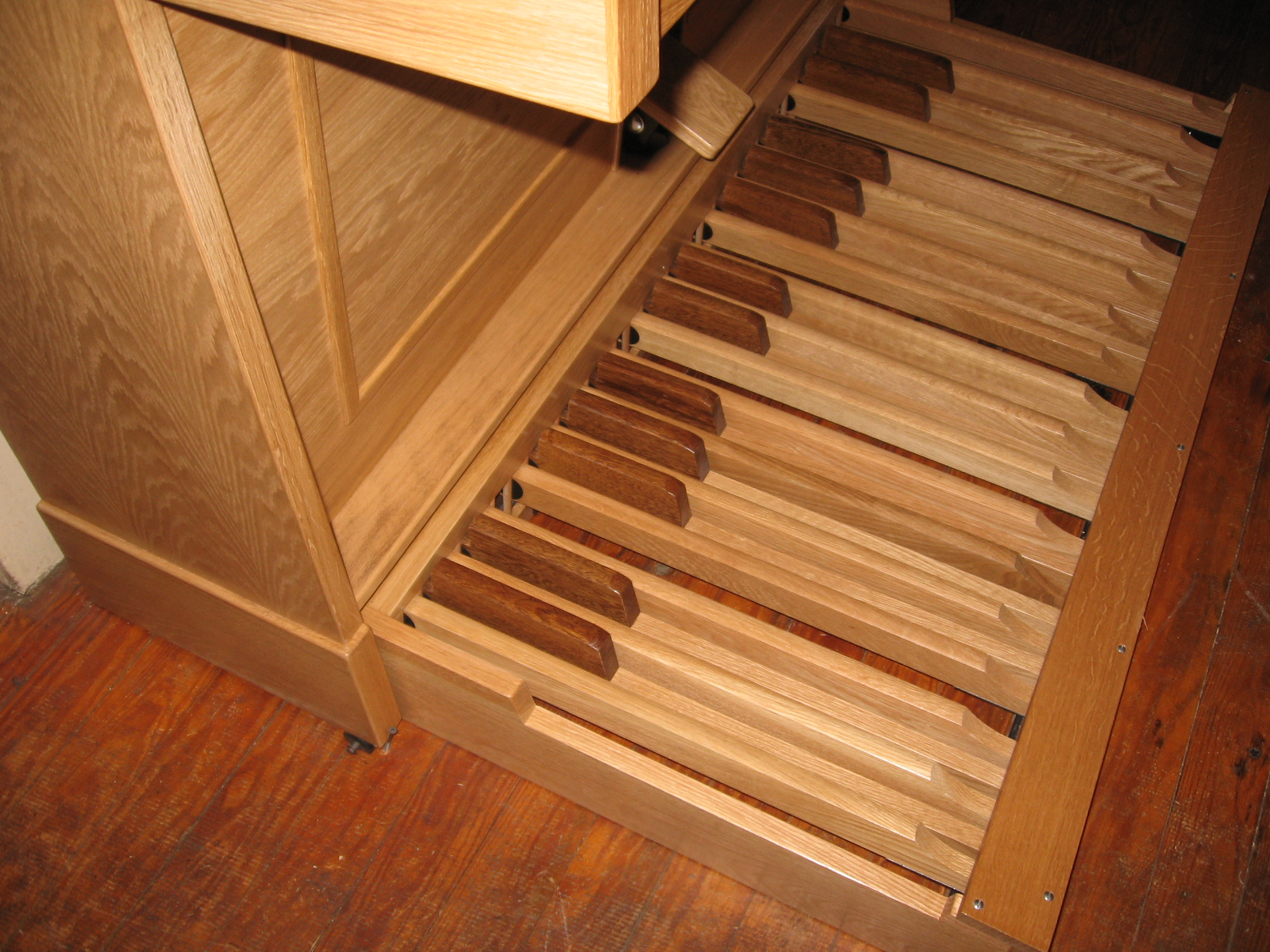
30-note BDO Standard (concave/parallel) pedalboard.

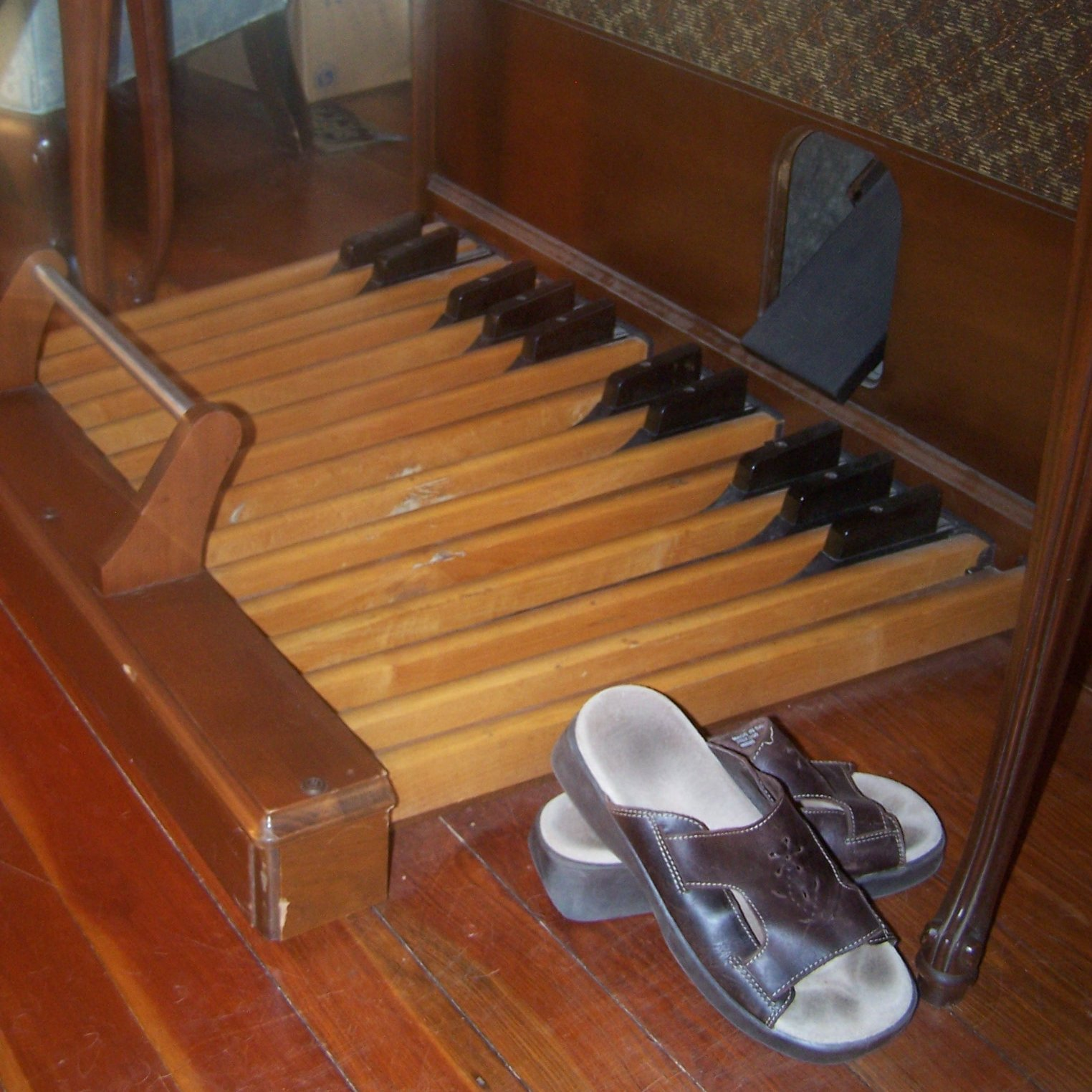
25-note flat/radiating pedalboard on an electro-mechanical Wurlitzer organ.

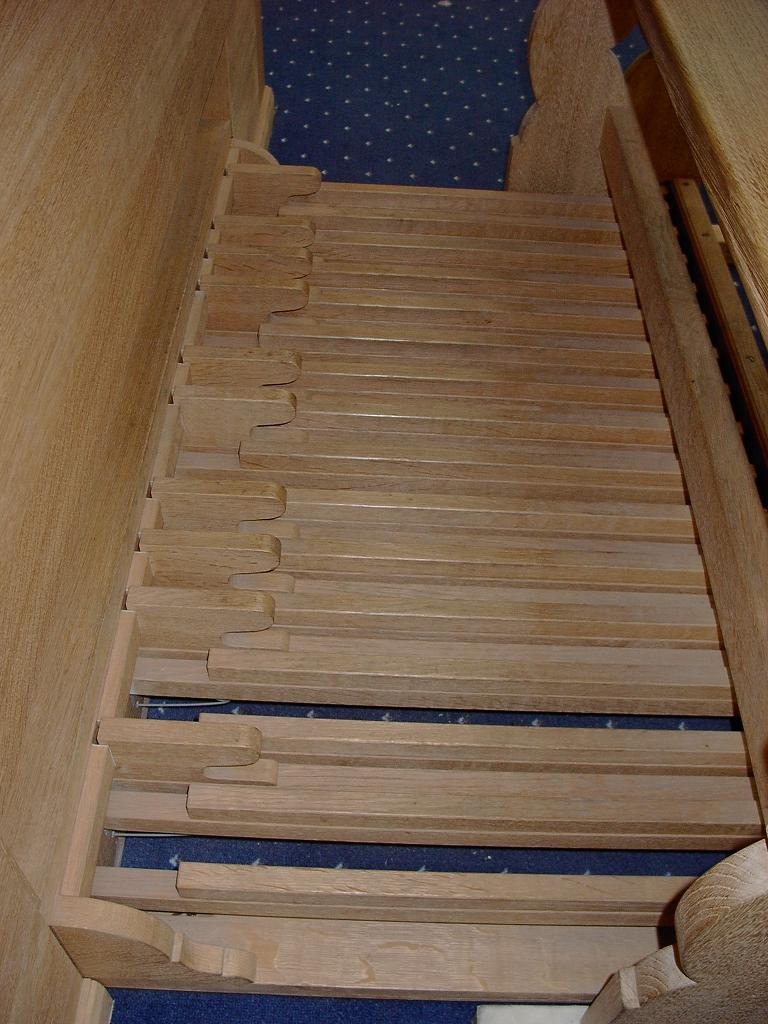
A different style of pedalboard, as used in a Jens Steinhoff organ in Varna, Bulgaria

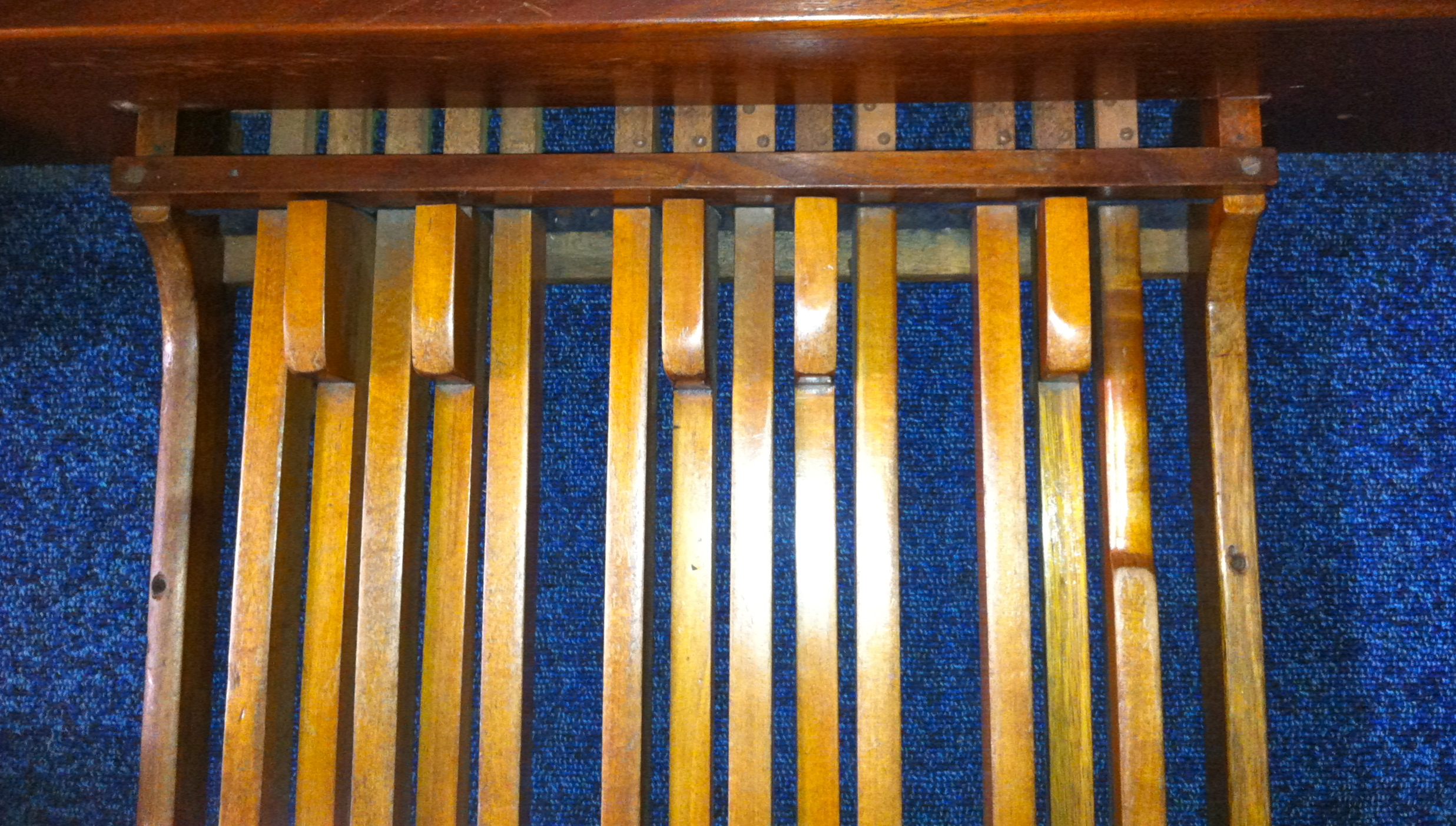
An unusual octave arrangement of G_{2} to G_{3} dating from the 1860s by Samuel Joscelyne

=== Pedal division ===
In an organ with more than one keyboard, the stops and the ranks that the stops control are separated into different divisions, in which the ranks of pipes are grouped together so that they make a "focused" or coherent sound. The pedal division, which is played from the pedal keyboard, usually includes more stops of 16′ pitch. The sound of the pedal division is generally voiced so that the pedal division complements the sound of the great division. Common 16′ stops found in the pedal division include the 16′ Bourdon, the 16′ Principal, and the 16′ Trombone. Eight foot stops include the 8′ Open Diapason. Pedal divisions may also include higher-register stops, such as the 4′ Choral Bass or various mixtures. When pedal parts are performed, a 16′ stop is usually paired with an 8′ one to provide more definition. For pedal parts that need accentuation, such as the Cantus Firmus melody in a 17th-century organ piece, many organs have a nasal-sounding reed stop in the pedal division, or a 4′ Principal designated on the stop knob as "Choralbass".

A few pedalboards have a pedal divide system that lets the organist split the pedalboard at its midpoint. With this system, an organist can play a melody with the right foot and a bass part with the left. The divided pedal is a type of coupler. It allows the sounds played on the pedals to be split, so the lower octave (principally that of the left foot) plays stops from the pedal division while the upper half (played by the right foot), plays stops from one of the manual divisions. The choice of manual is at the discretion of the performer, as is the 'split point' of the system.

The system can be found on the organs of Gloucester Cathedral, having been added by Nicholson & Co (Worcester) Ltd/David Briggs and Truro Cathedral, having been added by Mander Organs/David Briggs, as well as on the new nave console of Ripon Cathedral.

=== Controls ===
In some organs, a wooden panel called a "kickboard" or "kneeboard" is installed above the pedalboard, between the pedals and the lowest manual keyboard. Expression pedals, coupler controls and toe studs (to activate stops or stop combinations) may be located on or set into the kickboard. Expression pedals are used to open and close shades or shutters that enclose the pipes of a given division. Combination pistons are used to make rapid stop changes from the console on organs with electric stop action. Toe studs are pistons that can be operated by the feet, which change either the pedal stops or the entire organ.

In some organs, a "pedalboard check" mechanism serves as a safety catch, to shut off the pedalboard keys. The mechanism prevents accidental foot contact with the pedalboard from sounding notes in a section written only for the upper manuals.

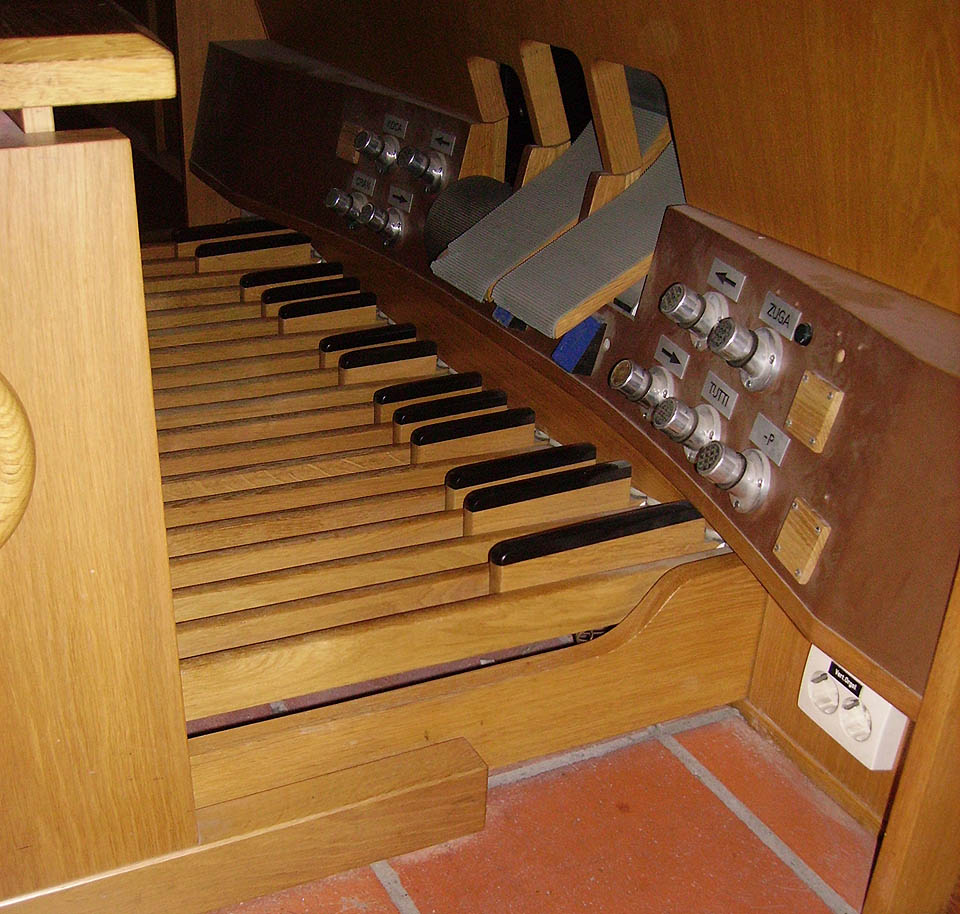
This photo of a BDO pedalboard shows the variety of other controls that are positioned near the pedalboard, including foot pistons and expression pedals.

=== Repertoire ===
The works of Dutch composer, organist, and pedagogue Jan Pieterszoon Sweelinck (1562–1621) contain the earliest example of an independent part for the pedal, rather than a sustained bass drone. His work straddled the end of the Renaissance and beginning of the Baroque eras, and he helped establish the north German organ tradition.

Dieterich Buxtehude (1637–1707), who was the most renowned composer of his time, was famous for his "...virtuosity and innovation at the pedal board." The young Johann Sebastian Bach was influenced by Buxtehude, who used the pedal board "as a full-fledged keyboard and devot[ed] virtuoso passages to it." J.S. Bach used the pedal to perform the melody in works such as his setting of the Christmas hymn, In Dulci Jubilo, in which the main theme in the tenor voice is played in the pedal on a higher-pitched stop. Bach also wrote compositions that use the pedal for dramatic virtuoso displays of scales and figurated passage-work in preludes, toccatas, fantasias and fugues.

There are a small number of organ compositions that are written solely for the pedal keyboard. English organist and composer George Thalben-Ball (1896–1987) wrote a piece entitled “Variations on a Theme by Paganini” for pedal keyboard. Based on Paganini's “Caprice No. 24”, a virtuoso work for solo violin, it includes pedal glissandi, leaps from one end of the pedalboard to the other, and four-note chords.

Firmin Swinnen (1885–1972) was a Belgian organist who became famous in the US in the 1920s for his theater organ improvisations during silent films. Swinnen wrote a pedal cadenza for an arrangement of Widor's Fifth Symphony. The cadenza was published separately by The American Organist. The publisher promoted the cadenza it as the "most daring, the most musical Pedal Cadenza obtainable"; this praise is corroborated by reviewers who were at the performance, who remarked at the complex footwork required by the work. The symphony was performed 29 times during the week of its premiere, to "...literally screaming audiences...who had never seen such a sight as an organist up on a lift [platform] in the spotlight playing with his feet alone".

After injuring his left arm in 2008, the principal organist for the Tabernacle Choir at Temple Square (Richard Elliott) prepared an arrangement of “Go Tell It On the Mountain” which begins with an entire verse played solely on the pedalboard to accommodate his then-injured arm. As his arm healed he added additional verses with the most demanding notes played with his right hand. The video of his unusual performance has garnered millions of views on YouTube.

Although the pedalboard is most frequently used for the bass part, composers from the 17th century to the present have often used it for higher parts as well. In his serene Le Banquet Céleste Olivier Messiaen places the tune, registered for 4′ flute (and higher mutation ranks), in the pedals.

From the early 20th century, composers have increasingly demanded an advanced pedal technique at the organ. Performers display their virtuosity in such works as Wilhelm Middelschulte's Perpetuum mobile, Leo Sowerby's Pageant (1931), and Jeanne Demessieux's Six études, Op. 5 (1944), which recall the dramatic organ pedal solos of the Baroque era.

=== Use on instruments other than organs ===
==== Pedal harpsichord and clavichord ====
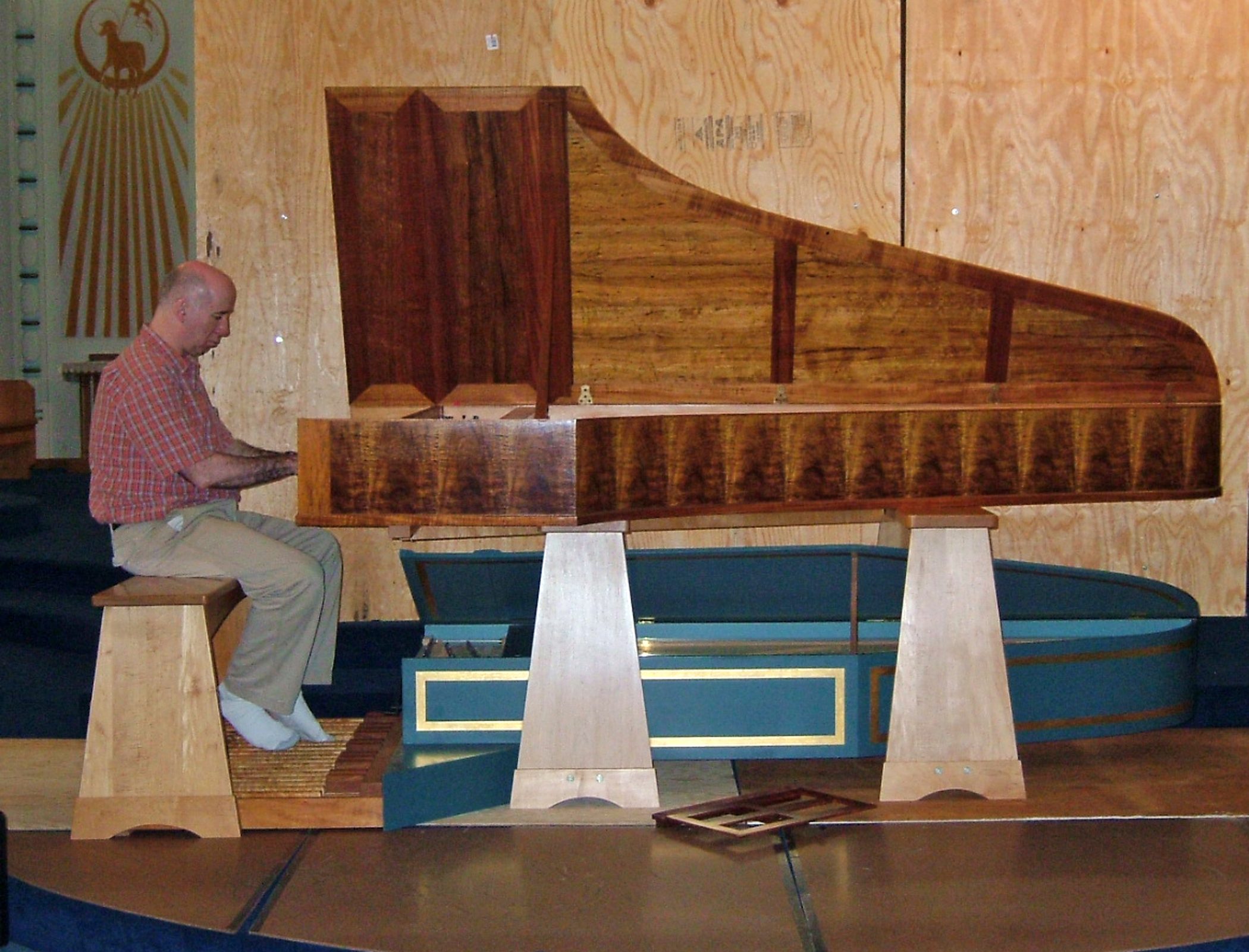
Peter Watchorn plays a pedal harpsichord by Hubbard & Broekman, Boston, 1990

Pedal keyboards were developed for the clavichord and harpsichords during the Baroque era so that organists could practise the pedal parts of their organ repertoire when they had no-one available to work the bellows for a church organ or, in the wintertime, to avoid having to practice on a church organ in an unheated church. Johann Sebastian Bach owned a pedal harpsichord and his organ trio sonatas BWV 525–530, Passacaglia and Fugue in C minor BWV 582, Toccata and Fugue in D minor BWV 565, and other works sound well when played on the instrument.

==== Pedal piano ====
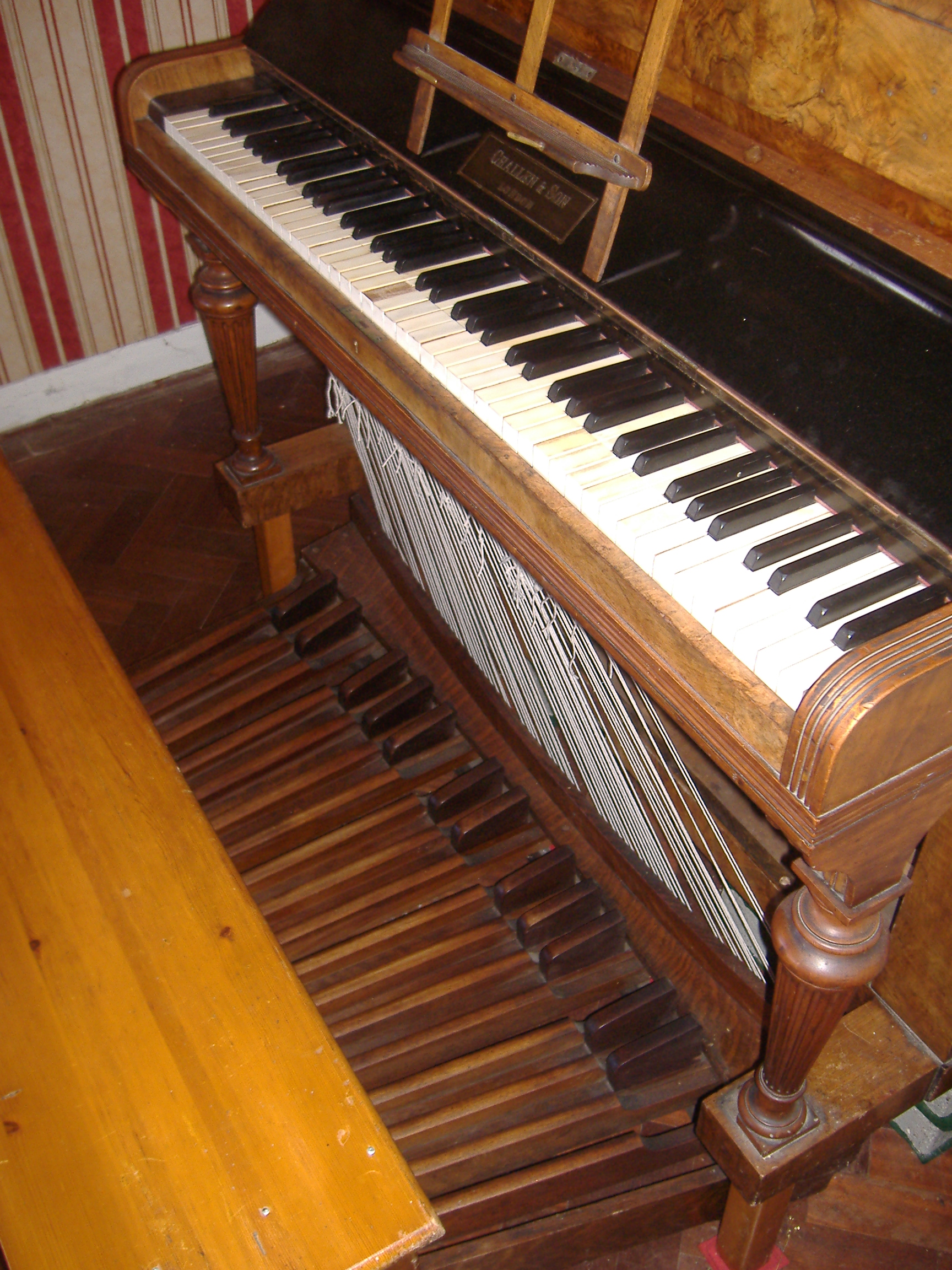
An upright pedal piano

The pedal piano (or pedalier piano) is a kind of piano that includes a pedalboard

There are two types of pedal piano:

- A pedal board integrated with a manual piano instrument, using the same strings and mechanism as the manual keyboard
- An independent, pedal played piano with its own mechanics and strings, placed below a regular piano

Wolfgang Amadeus Mozart owned a fortepiano with independent pedals, built for him in 1785. Robert Schumann had an upright pedal piano with 29 notes. In the 21st century, pedal pianos, the Doppio Borgato are made in the Borgato workshop in Italy. The bass pedalboard has 37 notes, A_{0} to A_{3} (rather than the standard 30 or 32 on an organ).

==== Carillon ====
Some large carillon systems for playing church bells include a pedalboard for the lowest-pitched bells. Carillon pedal keys activate a pull-down coupler that visibly moves the keys of the manual clavier and heavy clappers for the largest bells. These keys resemble the "button keys" of early organs, and are played by the player's toes. Because this non-legato technique involves no sliding, shoes with leather soles are not required.

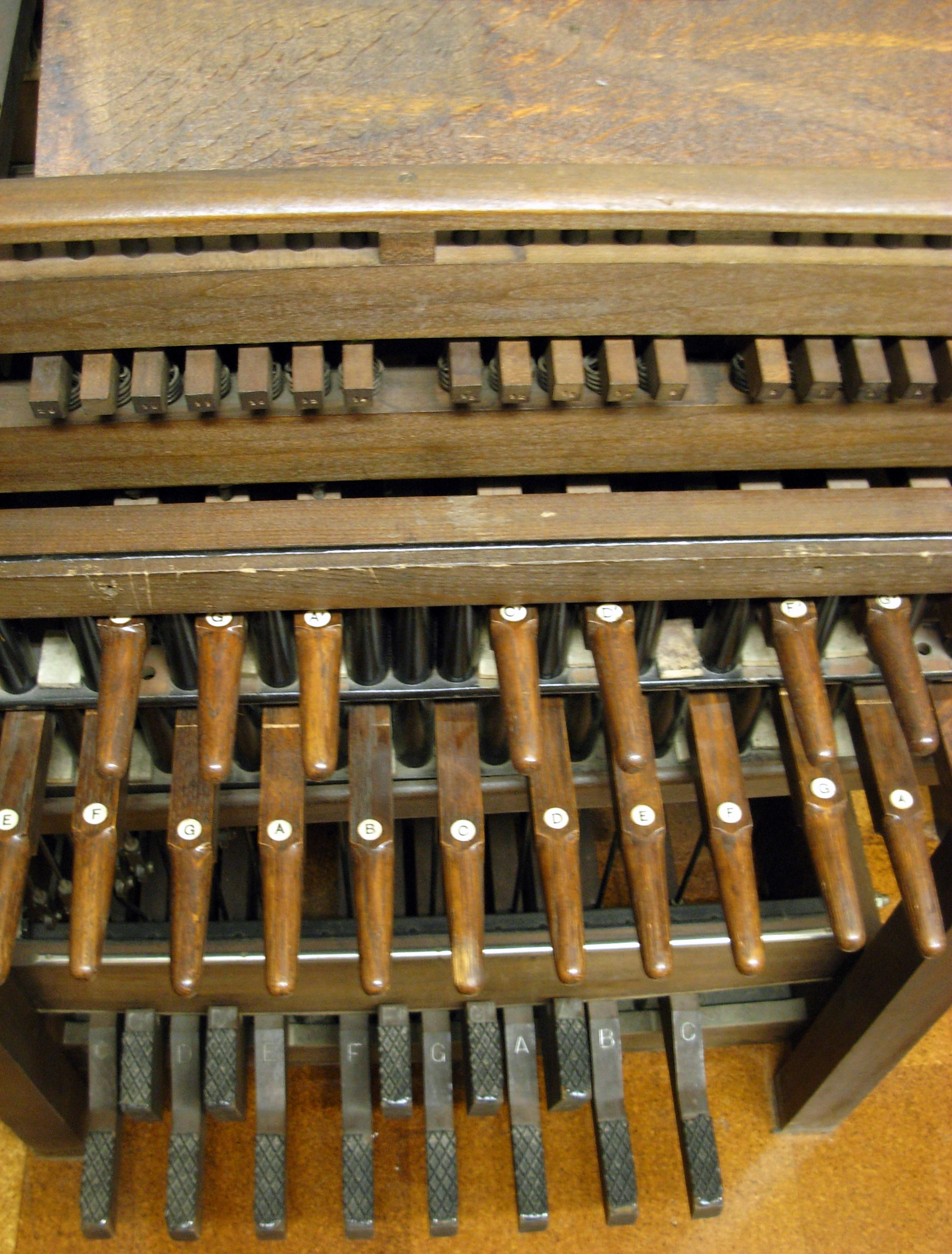
Carillon keyboard for playing church bells; the pedals play the lowest-pitched bells.

== In non-classical music ==
=== Jazz organ ===
After jazz organist Jimmy Smith popularized the Hammond organ in jazz in the 1950s, many jazz pianists "... who thought that getting organ-ized would be a snap ..." realized that the Hammond "... B-3 required not only a strong left hand, but studied coordination on the pedals to create the strong and solid "jazz bass" feel." Barbara Dennerlein combines advanced pedalboard techniques with agile playing on the manuals. Organists who play the bassline on the lower manual may do short taps on the bass pedals – often on the tonic of a tune's key and in the lowest register of the pedalboard – to simulate the low, resonant sound of a plucked upright bass string.

In popular music, pedaling style may be more varied and idiosyncratic, in part because jazz or pop organists may be self-taught. Also, pedaling styles may differ due to the design of electromechanical organs and spinet organs, many of which have shorter pedalboards designed to play primarily with the left foot, so that the right foot can control a volume (swell) pedal.

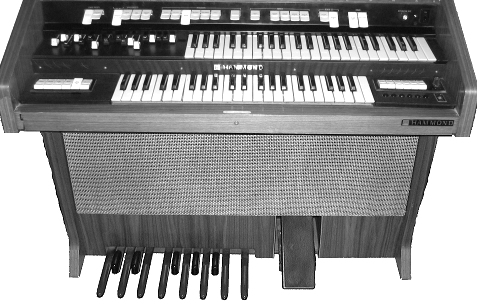
This Hammond spinet organ shows the relatively short pedals and 13-note range used on spinet organs

=== Rock and fusion ===
In the 1970s, some progressive rock groups such as Yes, Pink Floyd, Genesis, Atomic Rooster and Rush used standalone Moog Taurus bass pedalboard synths, which were nicknamed "bass pedals" (despite the fact that the Taurus could play in a wide range, from bass to treble range). The Taurus generated an analog synth bass tone for amplification by a bass amp. Other groups, such as Led Zeppelin and Van Der Graaf Generator used the bass pedals of the Hammond organ in place of a bass guitar for several of their recordings and for live performances.

Other users included metal and hard rock bands such as Yngwie Malmsteen, Styx, and Francis Buchholz of the Scorpions, and Justin Harris of Menomena. Ex-Genesis guitarist Steve Hackett had a set mounted waist high, which his brother, John Hackett, played with his hands for the intro of Clocks – The Angel Of Mons from the album Spectral Mornings. Adam Jones of Tool uses the Moog Taurus along with an Access Virus B synth to trigger live effects. The keyboardist for the rock group Emerson, Lake & Palmer took this idea to its logical conclusion by performing all of the first movement, and part of the second of The Three Fates on the organ of Royal Festival Hall in London.

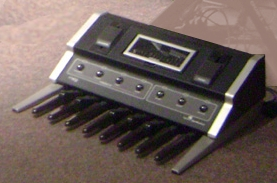
A 1970s-era Moog Taurus synth

As well, some pop groups (e.g., The Police, Muse, U2) and fusion bands have used bass pedalboards to produce sounds in the bass range. They are most commonly used by keyboard players as an adjunct to keyboards, but can be played in combination with other instruments (e.g., by the bass guitar or electric guitar player), or by themselves.

Standalone pedalboards usually have a 13-note range and short pedals, which limits the types of basslines to fairly simple passages. A group's bass guitarist or electric guitarist playing the pedalboard from a standing position can only use one foot at a time, which further limits what they can play. The BASYN analog bass synthesizer is a two-VCO analog synthesizer with a 13-note "button board"—with momentary push-button switches in place of pedals. Another variant used in rock bands is a bass pedalboard laid out as a tablature representation of part of the four strings of an electric bass guitar.

=== MIDI and synthesizer pedalboards ===
In the 1990s, standalone electronic MIDI controller pedalboards became widely available. Unlike the Moog Taurus pedalboards, MIDI pedalboards do not produce tones by themselves, but control a MIDI-compatible electronic keyboard or MIDI sequencer. In jazz organ trios, a keyboardist using this type of pedalboard usually connects it to a MIDI-compatible electronic Hammond organ-style keyboard. On modern electronic synthesizers such as the Yamaha Electone, the pedals are not limited to traditional bass notes but may instead produce many different sounds, including high-register tones. While MIDI pedalboards are typically used for musical sounds, since they use MIDI, technically the footpedals could be used to trigger lights or other electronic elements of a show.

MIDI pedalboards offer a range of features. Some MIDI pedalboards contain velocity-sensitive triggers, which produce MIDI velocity information for musical dynamics. MIDI pedalboards such as the 13-note Roland PK-5 include a row of MIDI toe switches above the pedal keyboard, so the performer can select preset tones or MIDI channels or change the octave. Larger 25-note Roland pedalboards also include an expression pedal for controlling the volume or other parameters.

In the 2000s, controller designer Keith McMillen developed a 13-note velocity-sensitive pedalboard, the 12 Step foot controller, a MIDI controller with a USB output that can be connected to a MIDI-equipped synthesizer or sound module. McMillen's pedalboard differs from other pedalboards in that it senses a variety of types of velocity and pressure, which the user can program to cause different effects on the synthesizer patch. McMillen's pedalboard can be programmed so that pressing an individual pedal triggers chords (up to five simultaneous notes), which a one person band could use to provide accompaniment for live shows.

The Roland PK-9 and the Hammond XPK-200 are 20-note pedalboards that sound from low C to a high G. The Nord PedalKeys is a 27-note pedalboard, going from a low C to a high D. As compared with a 25-note pedalboard, the PedalKeys adds a high C# and a high D.

Some MIDI pedalboards are designed for the church pipe organ market, which means that they use AGO specifications such as a 32-note range. Most pipe organ-style MIDI pedalboards are too unwieldy for transportation, so they are typically installed under the upper manuals. However, a German company makes a MIDI pedalboard with a hinge in the middle and wheels on the underside for easy transport. Since AGO-specification MIDI pedalboards are often priced in between US$1000 and US$3000, some amateur home organists make DIY MIDI pedalboards by retrofitting an old pedalboard with MIDI. Due to the popularity of theater organs and Hammond organs during the 1950s and 1960s, many organ parts are on the market—including pedalboards (often with less than 32 notes, such as 20 or 25 notes) that cost under US$300. After the pedalboard is cleaned up and glass reed switches are repaired or replaced, the pedal contacts are soldered into a keyboard matrix circuit-equipped MIDI encoder, which then connects to any MIDI device to produce the sound of an organ or other instrument.

== See also ==
- Organ shoes
- Bass pedals
- Keyboard bass
