= Firmin Swinnen =

Belgian organist (1885–1972)

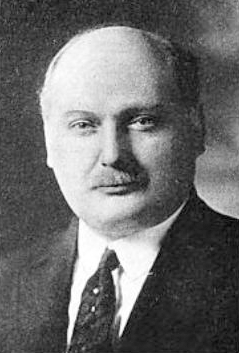
- In the Musical Advance, June 1923

Background information
- Born: 1885; Montaigu, Belgium
- Died: April 18, 1972 (aged 86–87) Wilmington, Delaware
- Instrument: Theatre organs

Firmin Swinnen (1885–1972) was a Belgian theater organist and concert artist who was noted for his organ improvisations during silent films in New York City.

== Career ==
Born in Montaigu, Belgium, Swinnen became an organist at the Antwerp cathedral, until World War I caused him to flee to the UK. He played many recitals in Great Britain for war charities, and then he moved to the US, where he played the Austin organ in the Rialto Theater in New York City, and then to the Rivoli theater. At the Rivoli, Swinnen specialized in lengthy improvisations during silent films using theater organs - massive pipe organs with a variety of sound effects and percussion sounds.

He was organist/choirmaster at Christ Church Christiana Hundred in Greenville, Delaware from 1925 to 1956, a church which was supported by the duPont family. He played the organ pedal keyboard solo part in the concerto version Mr. Frank Stewart Adams wrote for the opening Allegro of Widor's Fifth Symphony. Commentators noted that "Few men can improvise musically interesting caprices, scherzos, toccatas, and gavottes by the hour".

From 1923 to 1956, he was a concert organist in residence at Longwood, the Du Pont estate, where he played for Pierre S. du Pont on a massive 1930 Aeolian organ which he also designed. With its 10,010 pipes which took fourteen railway freight cars to transport to the grounds, the Aeolian organ was one of the largest organs installed at a private estate. The instrument, which spoke into the conservatory ballroom, was used for charity concerts in the indoor tropical gardens.

He died in Wilmington, Delaware on April 18, 1972, and was buried at Cathedral Cemetery.

== Works ==
- Chinoiserie, for organ, 1921
- Soir de Printemps, for organ, 1921
- Soir d'Automne, for organ, 1921
- Aria, for organ, 1952
- Longwood Sketches, for organ, 1927
- In the Shadow of the Old Tree
- Rosebuds (capriccietto)
- Dewdrops
- Sunshine (toccata)
